= Civil Rights Act =

Stock short title used for US legislation

Civil Rights Act may refer to several civil right acts in the United States. These acts of the United States Congress are meant to protect rights to ensure individuals' freedom from infringement by governments, social organizations, and private individuals.

The first wave of civil rights acts were passed during the Reconstruction era after the American Civil War. The Civil Rights Act of 1866 extends the rights of emancipated slaves by stating that any person born in the United States regardless of race is an American citizen. The Enforcement Acts of 1870–1871 allows the President to protect Black American men’s right to vote, to hold office, to serve on juries, and for Black men and women to receive equal protection of laws, including protection from racist violence. The Civil Rights Act of 1875 prohibited discrimination in "public accommodations" until it was found unconstitutional in 1883 by the Supreme Court of the United States. The Jim Crow Laws were established during the 19th century and served to block African American votes, ban integration in public facilities such as schools, and forbid interracial marriage in the South. The enactment of these laws was able to vastly undermine the progress toward equality which was made during the Reconstruction era.

Civil Rights Acts would not be passed for 82 more years until the success of the Civil rights movement which aimed to abolish legalized racial segregation, discrimination, and disenfranchisement in the country, which was most commonly employed against African Americans. The Civil Rights Act of 1957 established the Civil Rights Commission and the Civil Rights Act of 1960 established federal inspection of local voter registration polls. The landmark Civil Rights Act of 1964 prohibits discrimination based on race, color, religion, sex, and national origin by federal and state governments as well as public places. The Civil Rights Act of 1968 prohibits discrimination in sale, rental, and financing of housing based on race, creed, and national origin. The Civil Rights Restoration Act of 1987 specifies that recipients of federal funds must comply with civil rights laws in all areas, not just in the particular program or activity that received federal funding. The Civil Rights Act of 1990 was a bill that would have made it easier for plaintiffs to win civil rights cases which was vetoed by President George H. W. Bush. The Americans with Disabilities Act of 1990 prohibits discrimination based on disability. The Civil Rights Act of 1991 provides the right to trial by jury on discrimination claims and introducing the possibility of emotional distress damages, while limiting the amount that a jury could award.

== Background ==
The first shift towards equality for African Americans occurred when President Abraham Lincoln passed the Emancipation Proclamation in 1863, which declared that "all persons held as slaves... shall be then, thenceforward, and forever free...". As initially ratified, the United States Constitution granted each state complete discretion to determine voter qualifications for its residents.

In American history, the Reconstruction era was the period from 1865-1877 following the end of the American Civil War. This period was marked by various attempts made to redress the inequities imposed on African Americans through slavery. Three Reconstruction Amendments were ratified and limited this discretion. The Thirteenth Amendment (1865) prohibits slavery "except as a punishment for crime"; the Fourteenth Amendment (1868) grants citizenship to anyone "born or naturalized in the United States" and guarantees every person due process and equal protection rights; and the Fifteenth Amendment (1870) provides that "[t]he right of citizens of the United States to vote shall not be denied or abridged by the United States or by any State on account of race, color, or previous condition of servitude." These amendments were established to provide African Americans the same civil rights as white Americans, and also empower Congress to enforce their provisions through "appropriate legislation". This time period marked the beginnings of the Civil Rights Movement.

To enforce the Reconstruction Amendments, Congress passed the Enforcement Acts in the 1870s. The acts criminalized the obstruction of a citizen's voting rights and provided for federal supervision of the electoral process, including voter registration. By 1873, Supreme Court decisions began to limit the scope of Reconstruction legislation, and many whites resorted to intimidation and violence to undermine African Americans' voting rights. In 1875 the Supreme Court struck down parts of the legislation as unconstitutional in United States v. Cruikshank and United States v. Reese.

The Compromise of 1877, an informal agreement to resolve a political dispute, marked the end of the Reconstruction era. After the Reconstruction Era ended in 1877, enforcement of these civil rights laws ceased, and in 1894, Congress repealed most of their provisions. Southern Democrats largely stopped adhering to the provisions of Reconstruction legislation, ceasing to intervene in Southern voting practices, which prompted widespread disenfranchisement of African American voters during and after Reconstruction. From 1868 to 1888, electoral fraud and violence throughout the South suppressed the African-American vote. From 1888 to 1908, Southern states legalized disenfranchisement by enacting Jim Crow laws; they amended their constitutions and passed legislation to impose various voting restrictions, including literacy tests, poll taxes, property-ownership requirements, moral character tests, requirements that voter registration applicants interpret particular documents, and grandfather clauses that allowed otherwise-ineligible persons to vote if their grandfathers voted (which excluded many African Americans whose grandfathers had been slaves or otherwise ineligible). During this period, the Supreme Court generally upheld efforts to discriminate against racial minorities. In Giles v. Harris (1903), the court held that regardless of the Fifteenth Amendment, the judiciary did not have the remedial power to force states to register racial minorities to vote.

== The Civil Rights Act of 1866 ==
The Civil Rights Act of 1866 (14 Stat. 27–30, enacted April 9, 1866, reenacted 1870) was the first United States federal law to define citizenship and affirm that all citizens are equally protected by the law. It was mainly intended, in the wake of the American Civil War, to protect the civil rights of persons of African descent born in or brought to the United States.

The Act was passed by Congress in 1866 and vetoed by U.S. President Andrew Johnson. In April 1866, Congress again passed the bill to support the Thirteenth Amendment, and Johnson again vetoed it, but a two-thirds majority in each chamber overrode the veto to allow it to become law without presidential signature.

John Bingham and other congressmen argued that Congress did not yet have sufficient constitutional power to enact this law. Following passage of the Fourteenth Amendment in 1868, Congress ratified the 1866 Act in 1870.

The act had three primary objectives for the integration of African Americans into the American society following the Civil War: 1.) a definition of American citizenship 2.) the rights which come with this citizenship and 3.) the unlawfulness to deprive any person of citizenship rights "on the basis of race, color, or prior condition of slavery or involuntary servitude." The act accomplished these three primary objectives.

The author of the Civil Rights Act of 1866 was United States Senator Lyman Trumbull. Congressman James F. Wilson summarized what he considered to be the purpose of the act as follows, when he introduced the legislation in the House of Representatives:

It provides for the equality of citizens of the United States in the enjoyment of "civil rights and immunities." What do these terms mean? Do they mean that in all things civil, social, political, all citizens, without distinction of race or color, shall be equal? By no means can they be so construed. Do they mean that all citizens shall vote in the several States? No; for suffrage is a political right which has been left under the control of the several States, subject to the action of Congress only when it becomes necessary to enforce the guarantee of a republican form of government. Nor do they mean that all citizens shall sit on the juries, or that their children shall attend the same schools. The definition given to the term "civil rights" in Bouvier's Law Dictionary is very concise, and is supported by the best authority. It is this: "Civil rights are those which have no relation to the establishment, support, or management of government."

During the subsequent legislative process, the following key provision was deleted: "there shall be no discrimination in civil rights or immunities among the inhabitants of any State or Territory of the United States on account of race, color, or previous condition of servitude." John Bingham was an influential supporter of this deletion, on the ground that courts might construe the term "civil rights" more broadly than people like Wilson intended. Weeks later, Senator Trumbull described the bill's intended scope:

This bill in no manner interferes with the municipal regulations of any State which protects all alike in their rights of person and property. It could have no operation in Massachusetts, New York, Illinois, or most of the States of the Union.

On April 5, 1866, the Senate overrode President Andrew Johnson's veto. This marked the first time that the U.S. Congress ever overrode a presidential veto for a major piece of legislation.

=== Content ===
With an incipit of "An Act to protect all Persons in the United States in their Civil Rights, and furnish the Means of their vindication", the act declared that all people born in the United States who are not subject to any foreign power are entitled to be citizens, without regard to race, color, or previous condition of slavery or involuntary servitude. A similar provision (called the Citizenship Clause) was written a few months later into the proposed Fourteenth Amendment to the United States Constitution.

The Civil Rights Act of 1866 also said that any citizen has the same right that a white citizen has to make and enforce contracts, sue and be sued, give evidence in court, and inherit, purchase, lease, sell, hold, and convey real and personal property. Additionally, the act guaranteed to all citizens the "full and equal benefit of all laws and proceedings for the security of person and property, as is enjoyed by white citizens, and ... like punishment, pains, and penalties..." Persons who denied these rights on account of race or previous enslavement were guilty of a misdemeanor and upon conviction faced a fine not exceeding $1,000, or imprisonment not exceeding one year, or both.

The act used language very similar to that of the Equal Protection Clause in the newly proposed Fourteenth Amendment. In particular, the act discussed the need to provide "reasonable protection to all persons in their constitutional rights of equality before the law, without distinction of race or color, or previous condition of slavery or involuntary servitude, except as a punishment for crime, whereof the party shall have been duly convicted. ..."

This statute was a major part of general federal policy during Reconstruction, and was closely related to the Second Freedmen's Bureau Act of 1866. According to Congressman John Bingham, "the seventh and eighth sections of the Freedmen's Bureau bill enumerate the same rights and all the rights and privileges that are enumerated in the first section of this [the Civil Rights] bill."

Parts of the Civil Rights Act of 1866 are enforceable into the 21st century, according to the United States Code:

All persons within the jurisdiction of the United States shall have the same right in every State and Territory to make and enforce contracts, to sue, be parties, give evidence, and to the full and equal benefit of all laws and proceedings for the security of persons and property as is enjoyed by white citizens, and shall be subject to like punishment, pains, penalties, taxes, licenses, and exactions of every kind, and to no other.

One section of the United States Code (42 U.S.C. §1981), is §1 of the Civil Rights Act of 1866 as revised and amended by subsequent Acts of Congress. The Civil Rights Act of 1866 was reenacted by the Enforcement Act of 1870, ch. 114, § 18, 16 Stat. 144, codified as sections 1977 and 1978 of the Revised Statutes of 1874, and appears now as 42 U.S.C. §§ 1981–82 (1970). Section 2 of the Civil Rights Act of 1866, as subsequently revised and amended, appears in the US Code at 18 U.S.C. §242. After the fourteenth amendment became effective, the 1866 Act was reenacted as an addendum to the Enforcement Act of 1870 in order to dispel any possible doubt as to its constitutionality. Act of May 31, 1870, ch. 114, § 18, 16 Stat. 144.

=== Enactment, constitutionalization, and reenactment ===
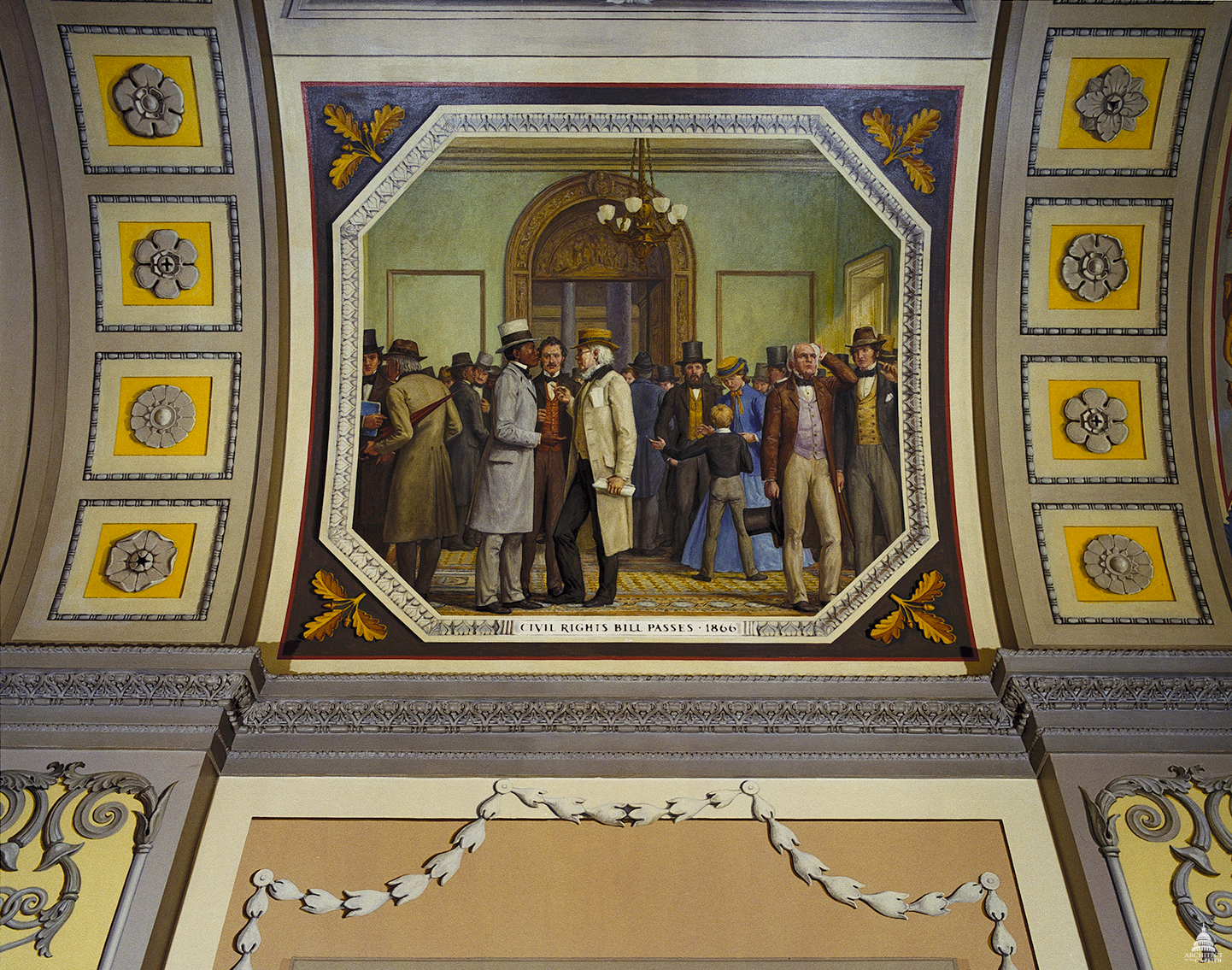
Allyn Cox's mural of the passage of the act

Senator Lyman Trumbull was the Senate sponsor of the Civil Rights Act of 1866, and he argued that Congress had power to enact it in order to eliminate a discriminatory "badge of servitude" prohibited by the Thirteenth Amendment. Congressman John Bingham, principal author of the first section of the Fourteenth Amendment, was one of several Republicans who believed (prior to that Amendment) that Congress lacked power to pass the 1866 Act. In the 20th century, the U.S. Supreme Court ultimately adopted Trumbull's Thirteenth Amendment rationale for congressional power to ban racial discrimination by states and by private parties, as the Thirteenth Amendment does not require a state actor.

To the extent that the Civil Rights Act of 1866 may have been intended to go beyond preventing discrimination, by conferring particular rights on all citizens, the constitutional power of Congress to do that was more questionable. For example, Representative William Lawrence argued that Congress had power to enact the statute because of the Privileges and Immunities Clause in Article IV of the original unamended Constitution, even though courts had suggested otherwise.

In any event, there is currently no consensus that the language of the Civil Rights Act of 1866 actually purports to confer any legal benefits upon white citizens. Representative Samuel Shellabarger said that it did not.

After enactment of the Civil Rights Act of 1866 by overriding a presidential veto, some members of Congress supported the Fourteenth Amendment in order to eliminate doubts about the constitutionality of the Civil Rights Act of 1866, or to ensure that no subsequent Congress could later repeal or alter the main provisions of that Act. Thus, the Citizenship Clause in the Fourteenth Amendment parallels citizenship language in the Civil Rights Act of 1866, and likewise the Equal Protection Clause parallels nondiscrimination language in the 1866 Act; the extent to which other clauses in the Fourteenth Amendment may have incorporated elements of the Civil Rights Act of 1866 is a matter of continuing debate.

Ratification of the Fourteenth Amendment was completed in 1868, 2 years after, the 1866 Act was reenacted, as Section 18 of the Enforcement Act of 1870.

After Johnson's veto was overridden, the measure became law. Despite this victory, even some Republicans who had supported the goals of the Civil Rights Act began to doubt that Congress possessed the constitutional power to turn those goals into laws. The experience encouraged both radical and moderate Republicans to seek Constitutional guarantees for black rights, rather than relying on temporary political majorities.

The activities of groups such as the Ku Klux Klan (KKK) undermined the act, meaning that it failed to immediately secure the civil rights of African Americans.

While it has been de jure illegal in the U.S. to discriminate in employment and housing on the basis of race since 1866, federal penalties were not provided for until the second half of the 20th century (with the passage of related civil rights legislation), which meant remedies were left to the individuals involved: because those being discriminated against had limited or no access to legal assistance, this often left many victims of discrimination without recourse.

There have been an increasing number of remedies provided under this act since the second half of the 20th century, including the landmark Jones v. Mayer and Sullivan v. Little Hunting Park, Inc. decisions in 1968.

== Enforcement Acts of 1870-1871 ==
The Enforcement Acts were three bills that were passed by the United States Congress between 1870 and 1871. They were criminal codes that protected African Americans’ right to vote, to hold office, to serve on juries, and receive equal protection of laws. Passed under the presidency of Ulysses S. Grant, the laws also allowed the federal government to intervene when states did not act to protect these rights. The acts passed following the ratification of the Fourteenth Amendment to the US Constitution, which gave full citizenship to anyone born in the United States or freed slaves, and the Fifteenth Amendment, which banned racial discrimination in voting.

At the time, the lives of all newly freed slaves, as well as their political and economic rights, were being threatened. This threat led to the creation of the Enforcement Acts. The main goal in creating these acts was to improve conditions for black people and freed slaves. The main target was the Ku Klux Klan, a white supremacy organization, which was targeting black people, and, later, other groups. Although this act was meant to fight the KKK and help black people and freedmen, many states were reluctant to take such relatively extreme actions, for several reasons. Some politicians at the state and federal levels were either members of the Klan, or did not have enough strength to fight the Klan. Another goal of these acts was to achieve national unity, by creating a country where all races were considered equal under the law.

The Enforcement Acts did many things to help freedmen. The main purpose under the act was the prohibited use of violence or any form of intimidation to prevent the freedmen from voting and denying them that right. There were many provisions placed under the act, many with serious consequences. The Enforcement Acts were created as part of the Reconstruction era following the American Civil War. To allow full national unity, all citizens must be accepted and viewed equally, with violence prohibited.

=== Enforcement Act of 1870 ===
The Enforcement Act of 1870 prohibited discrimination by state officials in voter registration on the basis of race, color, or previous condition of servitude. It established penalties for interfering with a person's right to vote and gave federal courts the power to enforce the act.

The act also authorized the President to employ the use of the army to uphold the act and the use of federal marshals to bring charges against offenders for election fraud, the bribery or intimidation of voters, and conspiracies to prevent citizens from exercising their constitutional rights.

The act banned the use of terror, force or bribery to prevent people from voting because of their race. Other laws banned the KKK entirely. Hundreds of KKK members were arrested and tried as common criminals and terrorists. The first Klan was all but eradicated within a year of federal prosecution.

=== Enforcement Act of 1871 ===
The Second Enforcement Act of 1871 (formally, "an Act to enforce the rights of citizens of the United States to vote in the several states of this union"), permitted federal oversight of local and state elections if any two citizens in a town with more than twenty-thousand inhabitants desired it.

The Enforcement Act of 1871 (second act) and the Civil Rights Act of 1875 are very similar to the original act as they all have the same goal, but revised the first act with the intention of being more effective. The Act of 1871 has more severe punishments with larger fines for disregarding the regulations, and the prison sentences vary in length. The final act, and the most effective, was also a revision. Although the fines lowered again, and the prison sentences remained approximately the same, this act was the best enforced by the government.

=== Ku Klux Klan Act ===
The Enforcement Act of 1871, the third Enforcement Act passed by Congress and also known as the Ku Klux Klan Act (formally, "An Act to enforce the Provisions of the Fourteenth Amendment to the Constitution of the United States, and for other Purposes"), made state officials liable in federal court for depriving anyone of their civil rights or the equal protection of the laws. It further made a number of the KKK's intimidation tactics into federal offenses, authorized the president to call out the militia to suppress conspiracies against the operation of the federal government, and prohibited those suspected of complicity in such conspiracies to serve on juries related to the Klan's activities. The Act also authorized the president to suspend the writ of habeas corpus if violence rendered efforts to suppress the Klan ineffective. It was passed at the request of Ulysses S. Grant.

=== Aftermath ===
As a response to the act, Klansmen in South Carolina were put on trial in front of juries made up of mainly African Americans. Amos T. Akerman was largely involved with the prosecutions of the Klansmen. He worked to make America aware of Klan violence and how much of a problem it was becoming. His work led to trials and to jail sentences of a few hundred Klan members. Many others who were put on trial either fled or were only given a warning. By 1872, the Klan as an organization had been officially broken.

The Enforcement Acts were a series of acts, but it was not until the Ku Klux Klan Act of 1871, the third Enforcement Act, that their regulations to protect black Americans, and to enforce the Fourteenth and Fifteenth Amendment to the United States Constitution were really enforced and followed. It was only after the creation of the third Enforcement Act that trials were conducted, and perpetrators were convicted for any crimes they had committed in violation of the Enforcement Acts.

=== Judicial interpretations ===
After the Colfax massacre in Louisiana, the federal government brought a civil rights case against nine men (out of 97 indicted) who were accused of paramilitary activity intended to stop black people from voting. In United States v. Cruikshank (1876), the Court ruled that the federal government did not have the authority to prosecute the men because the Fourteenth and Fifteenth Amendments provide only for redress against state actors. However, in Ex Parte Yarbrough (1884) the Court allowed individuals who were not state actors to be prosecuted because Article I Section 4 of the Constitution gives Congress the power to regulate federal elections.

In Hodges v. United States (1906) the Court addressed a possible Thirteenth Amendment rationale for the Enforcement Acts, and found that the federal government did not have the authority to punish a group of men for interfering with black workers through whitecapping. Hodges v. United States would be overruled in Jones v. Alfred H. Mayer Co. some 50 years later, stating for the first time since Reconstruction that the federal government could criminalize racist acts by private actors.

== Civil Rights Act of 1875 ==
The Civil Rights Act of 1875, sometimes called the Enforcement Act or the Force Act, was a United States federal law enacted during the Reconstruction era in response to civil rights violations against African Americans. The bill was passed by the 43rd United States Congress and signed into law by President Ulysses S. Grant on March 1, 1875. The act was designed to "protect all citizens in their civil and legal rights", providing for equal treatment in public accommodations and public transportation and prohibiting exclusion from jury service. It was originally drafted by Senator Charles Sumner in 1870, but was not passed until shortly after Sumner's death in 1875. The law was not effectively enforced, partly because President Grant had favored different measures to help him suppress election-related violence against blacks and Republicans in the Southern United States.

The Reconstruction era ended with the resolution of the 1876 presidential election, and the Civil Rights Act of 1875 was the last federal civil rights law enacted until the passage of the Civil Rights Act of 1957. In 1883, the Supreme Court ruled in the Civil Rights Cases that the public accommodation sections of the act were unconstitutional, saying Congress was not afforded control over private persons or corporations under the Equal Protection Clause. Parts of the Civil Rights Act of 1875 were later re-adopted in the Civil Rights Act of 1964 and the Civil Rights Act of 1968, both of which cited the Commerce Clause as the source of Congress's power to regulate private actors.

=== Legislative history ===
The drafting of the bill was performed early in 1870 by United States Senator Charles Sumner, a dominant Radical Republican in the Senate, with the assistance of John Mercer Langston, a prominent African American who established the law department at Howard University. The bill was proposed by Senator Sumner and co-sponsored by Representative Benjamin F. Butler, both Republicans from Massachusetts, in the 41st Congress of the United States in 1870. Congress removed the coverage of public schools that Sumner had included. The act was passed by the 43rd Congress in February 1875 as a memorial to honor Sumner, who had just died. It was signed into law by United States President Ulysses S. Grant on March 1, 1875.

=== Enforcement ===
President Grant had wanted an entirely different law to help him suppress election-related violence against blacks and Republicans in the South. Congress did not give him that, but instead wrote a law for equal rights to public accommodations that was passed as a memorial to Grant's bitterest enemy, the late Senator Charles Sumner. Grant never commented on the 1875 law, and did nothing to enforce it, says historian John Hope Franklin. Grant's Justice Department ignored it and did not send copies to US attorneys, says Franklin, while many federal judges called it unconstitutional before the Supreme Court shut it down. Franklin concludes regarding Grant and Hayes administrations, "The Civil Rights Act was never effectively enforced." Public opinion was opposed, with the black community in support. Historian Rayford Logan looking at newspaper editorials finds the press was overwhelmingly opposed.

=== Case law ===
The Supreme Court, in an 8–1 decision, declared sections of the act unconstitutional in the Civil Rights Cases on October 15, 1883, thus stripping the Civil Rights Act of 1875 of much of its ability to protect civil rights. Justice John Marshall Harlan provided the lone dissent. The Court held the Equal Protection Clause within the Fourteenth Amendment prohibits discrimination by the state and local government, but it does not give the federal government the power to prohibit discrimination by private individuals and organizations. The Court also held that the Thirteenth Amendment was meant to eliminate "the badge of slavery," but not to prohibit racial discrimination in public accommodations.

The Civil Rights Act of 1875 was the last federal civil rights bill signed into law until the Civil Rights Act of 1957, enacted during the Civil Rights Movement. In the late 19th and early 20th century, the legal justification for voiding the Civil Rights Act of 1875 was part of a larger trend by the United States Supreme Court majorities to invalidate most government regulations of the private sector, except when dealing with laws designed to protect traditional public morality. The Civil Rights Act of 1875 is notable as the last major piece of legislation related to Reconstruction that was passed by Congress during the Reconstruction era. These include the Civil Rights Act of 1866, the four Reconstruction Acts of 1867 and 1868, the three Enforcement Acts of 1870 and 1871, and the three Constitutional Amendments adopted between 1865 and 1870.

Provisions contained in the Civil Rights Act of 1875 were later readopted by Congress during the Civil Rights Movement as part of the Civil Rights Act of 1964 and the Civil Rights Act of 1968. The 1964 and 1968 acts relied upon the Commerce Clause contained in Article One of the Constitution of the United States rather than the Equal Protection Clause within the Fourteenth Amendment.

== Civil Rights Act of 1957 ==
The Civil Rights Act of 1957, signed by President Dwight D. Eisenhower on September 9, 1957, was the first federal civil rights legislation since the Civil Rights Act of 1875 to become law. After the Supreme Court ruled school segregation unconstitutional in 1954 in Brown v. Board of Education, Southern Democrats began a campaign of "massive resistance" against desegregation, and even the few moderate white leaders shifted to openly racist positions. Partly in an effort to defuse calls for more far-reaching reforms, Eisenhower proposed a civil rights bill that would increase the protection of African American voting rights.

The Supreme Court's 1954 ruling in the case of Brown v. Board of Education brought the issue of school desegregation to the fore of public attention, as Southern Democratic leaders began a campaign of "massive resistance" against desegregation. In the midst of this campaign, President Eisenhower proposed a civil rights bill designed to provide federal protection for African American voting rights; most African Americans in the Southern United States had been disenfranchised by state and local laws. Though the civil rights bill passed Congress, opponents of the act were able to remove or weaken several provisions via the Anderson–Aiken amendment and the O'Mahoney jury trial amendment, significantly watering down its immediate impact. During the debate over the law, Senator Strom Thurmond conducted the longest one-person filibuster in Senate history. Under the direction of Senate Majority Leader Lyndon B. Johnson of Texas, the Senate passed a watered-down, yet also passable, version of the House bill which removed stringent voting protection clauses.

Despite having a limited impact on African-American voter participation, at a time when black voter registration from 0% (in 11 counties) to less than 5% (in 97 counties) despite being majority-Black counties, the Civil Rights Act of 1957 did establish the United States Commission on Civil Rights and the United States Department of Justice Civil Rights Division. By 1960, black voting had increased by only 3%, and Congress passed the Civil Rights Act of 1960, which eliminated certain loopholes left by the 1957 Act. Congress would later pass far more effective civil rights laws in the form of the Civil Rights Act of 1964, the Voting Rights Act of 1965, and the Civil Rights Act of 1968.

=== Background ===
Following the Supreme Court ruling in Brown, which eventually led to the integration of public schools, Southern whites began a campaign of "Massive Resistance". Violence against black people rose; in Little Rock, Arkansas where President Dwight D. Eisenhower ordered U.S. paratroopers of the 101st Airborne Division to protect nine black teenagers integrating into a public school, the first time federal troops were deployed in the South to settle civil rights issues since the Reconstruction Era. There had been continued physical assaults against suspected activists and bombings of schools and churches in the South. Partly in an effort to defuse calls for more far-reaching reforms, President Eisenhower proposed a civil rights bill that would increase the protection of African American voting rights.

By 1957, only about 20% of black people were registered to vote. Despite being the majority in numerous counties and congressional districts in the South, most black people had been effectively disfranchised by discriminatory voter registration rules and laws in those states since the late 19th and early 20th centuries that were heavily instituted and propagated by Southern Democrats. Civil rights organizations had collected evidence of discriminatory practices, such as the administration of literacy and comprehension tests and poll taxes. While the states had the right to establish rules for voter registration and elections, the federal government found an oversight role in ensuring that citizens could exercise the constitutional right to vote for federal officers: electors for president and vice president and members of the US Congress.

=== Legislative history ===
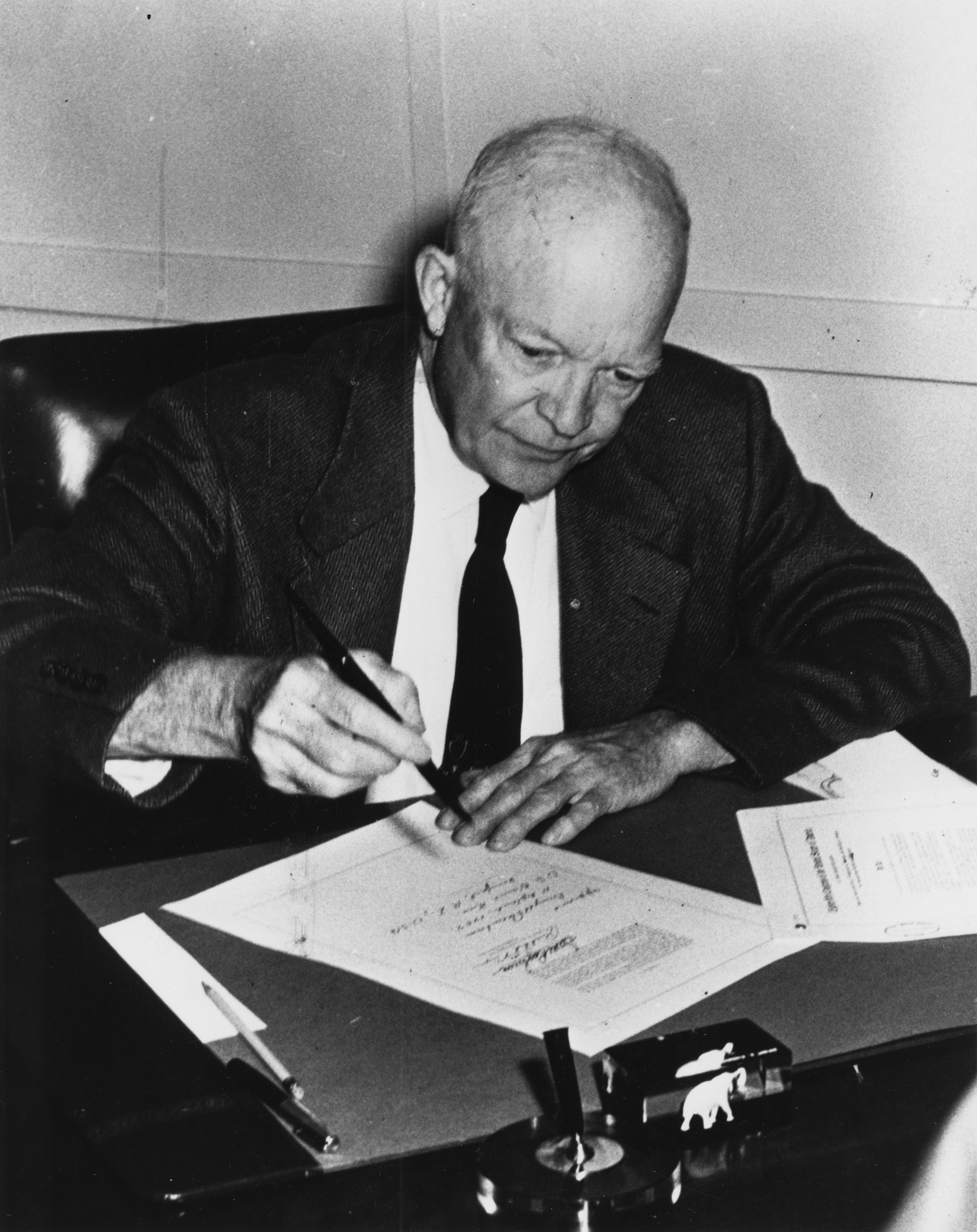
President Dwight D. Eisenhower signing the Civil Rights Act of 1957 on September 9, 1957

The Democratic Senate majority leader, Lyndon B. Johnson of Texas, who would play a vital role in the bill's passage in the Senate, realized that the bill and its journey through Congress could tear apart his party, as southern Democrats vehemently opposed civil rights, and its northern members were strongly in favor of them. Southern Democratic senators occupied chairs of numerous important committees because of their long seniority. As, in the near-century between the end of Reconstruction and the 1960s, white Southerners voted solidly as a bloc for the Democrats, Southern Democrats in Congress rarely lost their seats in elections, ensuring that they had more seniority than Democratic members of Congress from other parts of the country. Johnson sent the bill to the Senate Judiciary Committee, led by Democratic Senator James Eastland of Mississippi, who drastically altered the bill. Democratic Senator Richard Russell Jr., of Georgia had denounced the bill as an example of the federal government seeking to impose its laws on states. Johnson sought recognition from civil rights advocates for passing the bill as well as recognition from the anti-civil rights Democrats for weakening the bill so much as to make it toothless.

As well as a general if vague support for civil rights as the party of Lincoln, Republicans saw that this could be an effective way to increase the number of Black Republican voters as the blocking of the Bill by the Democrats in the Southern Caucus would become obvious. They, like Johnson, also saw the potential for dividing the Democratic party's Northern and Southern wings. This meant that the (on this issue) liberal but hardball Republican operators like the Vice President, Richard Nixon, who had a constitutional right to chair the Senate took a great interest in the Bill. Conservative Republican Senators who were sympathetic to Southern arguments on States rights were more likely to vote on a party basis. On the other hand, the Republicans were willing to quietly allow Democratic Southern obstruction if this meant that African-American and liberal voters would be more likely to see the culprits as Democrats.

==== Anderson–Aiken amendment ====
A bipartisan group of Senators realized that Southerners would not allow passage of the act with Title III, which authorized the US Attorney General to seek preventive relief in civil rights cases. Majority Leader Johnson convinced Senator Clinton Anderson (D-NM) to introduce an amendment to strip out the enforcement provisions of Title III. Anderson's initial hesitancy to be associated with the anti-civil rights bloc was met with Johnson's urging to introduce the amendment along with a Republican colleague. Anderson approached George Aiken (R-VT), who agreed to co-sponsor the amendment.

A crucial cause of the weakening of support for Title III was a speech given by the unofficial leader of the Southern Caucus the Georgian Democrat, Richard Russell, who pointed out that Title III was not a new law but an amendment of Section 1985 of Title 42 of the United States Code. It seems that this had not been understood previously by either the opponents or the supporters of the Civil Rights Act, including Douglas or Brownell. In his speech Russell drew out the implications of this, including the invocation of Section 1993 of Title 42 of the United States Code, a Reconstruction era law which wasn't mentioned in the bill and which authorized the President to enforce judicial decisions - which would include Brown v Board. This specter of military involvement in domestic politics became a worry not just for moderate previous supporters of the bill such as Bourke Hickenlooper (R-IA) - who after Russell's speech referred to Title III as a "violation of the civil rights of the white race." - but also strong supporters such as Douglas. Later President Eisenhower in answer to a direct question on Russell's charges distanced himself from the "exact language" of Title III.

President Eisenhower did not express enthusiasm for the provisions in Title III. In a press conference, he referred to it as going "too far too fast in laws", and instead placed an emphasis on the voting rights provisions in Title IV. This diminished the already-waning support for the title among Republicans, many of whom opposed its expansion of federal power on conservative grounds in spite of their sympathy towards civil rights causes.

The Anderson–Aiken amendment passed by a 52–38 vote. The vote on the amendment did not split purely along partisan or ideological lines; it was opposed by conservative William Knowland (R-CA) and supported by liberal Frank Church (D-ID).

==== Jury trial amendment ====
Majority Leader Johnson, who was intent on passing a fully weakened act in contrast to overseeing a legislative graveyard at the hands of a Southern filibuster, moved to effectively weaken the voting rights-related provisions in Title IV. Alleged violators of civil rights injunctions are normally entitled to jury trials, with the exception of civil contempt actions. A jury trial amendment that included the guarantee of jury trials in civil contempt actions would, in the South, result in perpetrators of voter suppression being acquitted by an all-white jury, thus ensuring no resulted accomplishment to enfranchise blacks.

The jury trial amendment was not introduced by a Southern Democrat, instead being spearheaded by Wyoming senator Joseph C. O'Mahoney. The motivation for Western liberal Democrats to spearhead the cause of weakening the Civil Rights Act of 1957 was attributed to their traditional populist disdain for the perceived disproportionate power wielded by judges to quell labor causes in the Western United States, thus contributing to a resonance with the expansion of jury trial rights, although Lyndon Johnson's biographer Robert Caro also claims that Johnson had facilitated a bargain that Western liberal Democrats would vote with the South in important votes on Civil Rights in return for Southern support for public involvement in the building of the Hells Canyon Dam.

There was also support from some unions, particularly the Railroad brotherhoods and the United Mine Workers of America who agreed that this would also stop injunctions in union cases. Their support was seen as a major reason why Senators in mining states such as West Virginia and mid western Republican senators where the railroads were strong became less hostile to the amendment.

On August 2, 1957, the Senate passed the jury trial amendment with majority support from Democratic members, both Northern and Southern. Following the vote, many Republicans were visible in their bitterness, having failed in an opportunity to spearhead the cause of civil rights against a deceitful, partisan Democratic effort. According to Johnson biographer Robert A. Caro:

In the wake of the vote, emotions spilled over. Richard Nixon could not contain his frustration and rage. When, as he was leaving the Chamber, reporters asked his reaction, the Vice President said, "This is one of the saddest days in the history of the Senate. It was a vote against the right to vote." Clarence Mitchell went to [William Knowland]'s office to discuss what to do now, and could hardly believe what he saw there. "That big, strong, brusque Knowland actually broke down and cried," Mitchell was to recall.

Several conservative Republican senators who voted for the Anderson–Aiken amendment on small-government grounds opposed the jury trial amendment for its intent of weakening civil rights efforts. Idaho senator Henry Dworshak decried that it "practically scuttled any hope of getting an effective civil rights bill."

==== Filibuster ====
Then-Democratic Senator Strom Thurmond of South Carolina, an ardent segregationist, sustained the longest one-person filibuster in history in an attempt to keep the bill from becoming law. His one-man filibuster lasted 24 hours and 18 minutes; he began with readings of every US state's election laws in alphabetical order. He later read from the Declaration of Independence, the Bill of Rights, and George Washington's Farewell Address.

To prevent a quorum call that could have relieved the filibuster by allowing the Senate to adjourn, cots were brought in from a nearby hotel for the legislators to sleep on while Thurmond discussed increasingly irrelevant and obscure topics. Other members of the Southern caucus, who had agreed as part of a compromise not to filibuster this bill, were upset with Thurmond. They believed his defiance made them look incompetent to their constituents. Other constituents were upset with their senators because they were seen as not helping Thurmond.

Thurmond pointed out that there was already a federal statute that prosecuted citizens who denied or intimidated voters at voting booths under a fine and/or imprisonment but that the bill then under consideration could legally deny trial by jury to those that continued to do so.

Democratic Representative Charles A. Boyle of Illinois, a member of the powerful Appropriations Subcommittee of Defense, pushed the bill through the House of Representatives.

==== Final passage ====
The bill passed 285–126 in the House of Representatives with a majority of both parties' support (Republicans 167–19, Democrats 118–107). It then passed 72–18 in the Senate, again with a majority of both parties (Republicans 43–0, Democrats 29–18). Despite large opposition from Southern Democrats, the Democratic U.S. Senators from Tennessee and Texas would support the law. President Eisenhower signed the bill on September 9, 1957.

The act established both the Commission on Civil Rights and the office of Assistant Attorney General for Civil Rights. Subsequently, on December 9, 1957, the Civil Rights Division was established within the Justice Department by order of US Attorney General William P. Rogers, giving the Assistant Attorney General for Civil Rights a distinct division to command. Previously, civil rights lawyers had enforced Reconstruction-era civil rights laws from within the Department's Criminal Division.

== Civil Rights Act of 1960 ==
The Civil Rights Act of 1960 (Pub. L. 86–449, 74 Stat. 89, enacted May 6, 1960) is a United States federal law that established federal inspection of local voter registration polls and introduced penalties for anyone who obstructed someone's attempt to register to vote. It dealt primarily with discriminatory laws and practices in the segregated South, by which African-Americans and Tejanos had been effectively disenfranchised since the late 19th and start of the 20th century. This was the fifth Civil Rights Act to be enacted in United States history. (Note: After the Civil Rights Acts of 1866, 1871, 1875, and 1957) Over an 85-year period, it was preceded only by the Civil Rights Act of 1957, whose shortcomings largely influenced its creation. This law served to more effectively enforce what was set forth in the 1957 act through eliminating certain loopholes in it, and to establish additional provisions. Aside from addressing voting rights, the Civil Rights Act of 1960 also imposed criminal penalties for obstruction of court orders to limit resistance to the Supreme Court's school desegregation decisions, arranged for free education for military members' children, and banned the act of fleeing to avoid prosecution for property damage. The Civil Rights Act of 1960 was signed into law by President Dwight D. Eisenhower.

== Civil Rights Act of 1964 ==
The Civil Rights Act of 1964 (Pub. L. 88–352, 78 Stat. 241, enacted July 2, 1964) is a landmark civil rights and labor law in the United States that outlaws discrimination based on race, color, religion, sex, (Note: Three Supreme Court rulings in June 2020 interpreted that employment discrimination on the basis of sexual orientation or gender identity is a form of discrimination on the basis of sex and is therefore also outlawed by the Civil Rights Act. See Bostock v. Clayton County, and also see below for more details.) and national origin. It prohibits unequal application of voter registration requirements, racial segregation in schools and public accommodations, and employment discrimination. The act "remains one of the most significant legislative achievements in American history".

Initially, powers given to enforce the act were weak, but these were supplemented during later years. Congress asserted its authority to legislate under several different parts of the United States Constitution, principally its enumerated power to regulate interstate commerce under the Commerce Clause of Article I, Section 8, its duty to guarantee all citizens equal protection of the laws under the 14th Amendment, and its duty to protect voting rights under the 15th Amendment.

The legislation was proposed by President John F. Kennedy in June 1963, but it was opposed by filibuster in the Senate. After Kennedy was assassinated on November 22, 1963, President Lyndon B. Johnson pushed the bill forward. The United States House of Representatives passed the bill on February 10, 1964, and after a 72-day filibuster, it passed the United States Senate on June 19, 1964. The final vote was 290–130 in the House of Representatives and 73–27 in the Senate. After the House agreed to a subsequent Senate amendment, the Civil Rights Act of 1964 was signed into law by President Johnson at the White House on July 2, 1964.

=== Legislative history ===
On June 11, 1963, President Kennedy met with Republican leaders to discuss the legislation before his television address to the nation that evening. Two days later, Senate Minority Leader Everett Dirksen and Senate Majority Leader Mike Mansfield both voiced support for the president's bill, except for provisions guaranteeing equal access to places of public accommodations. This led to several Republican Representatives drafting a compromise bill to be considered. On June 19, the president sent his bill to Congress as it was originally written, saying legislative action was "imperative". The president's bill went first to the House of Representatives, where it was referred to the Judiciary Committee, chaired by New York Democrat Emanuel Celler. After a series of hearings on the bill, Celler's committee strengthened the act, adding provisions to ban racial discrimination in employment, providing greater protection to black voters, eliminating segregation in all publicly owned facilities (not just schools), and strengthening the anti-segregation clauses regarding public facilities such as lunch counters. They also added authorization for the Attorney General to file lawsuits to protect individuals against the deprivation of any rights secured by the Constitution or U.S. law. In essence, this was the controversial "Title III" that had been removed from the 1957 Act and 1960 Act. Civil rights organizations pressed hard for this provision because it could be used to protect peaceful protesters and black voters from police brutality and suppression of free speech rights.

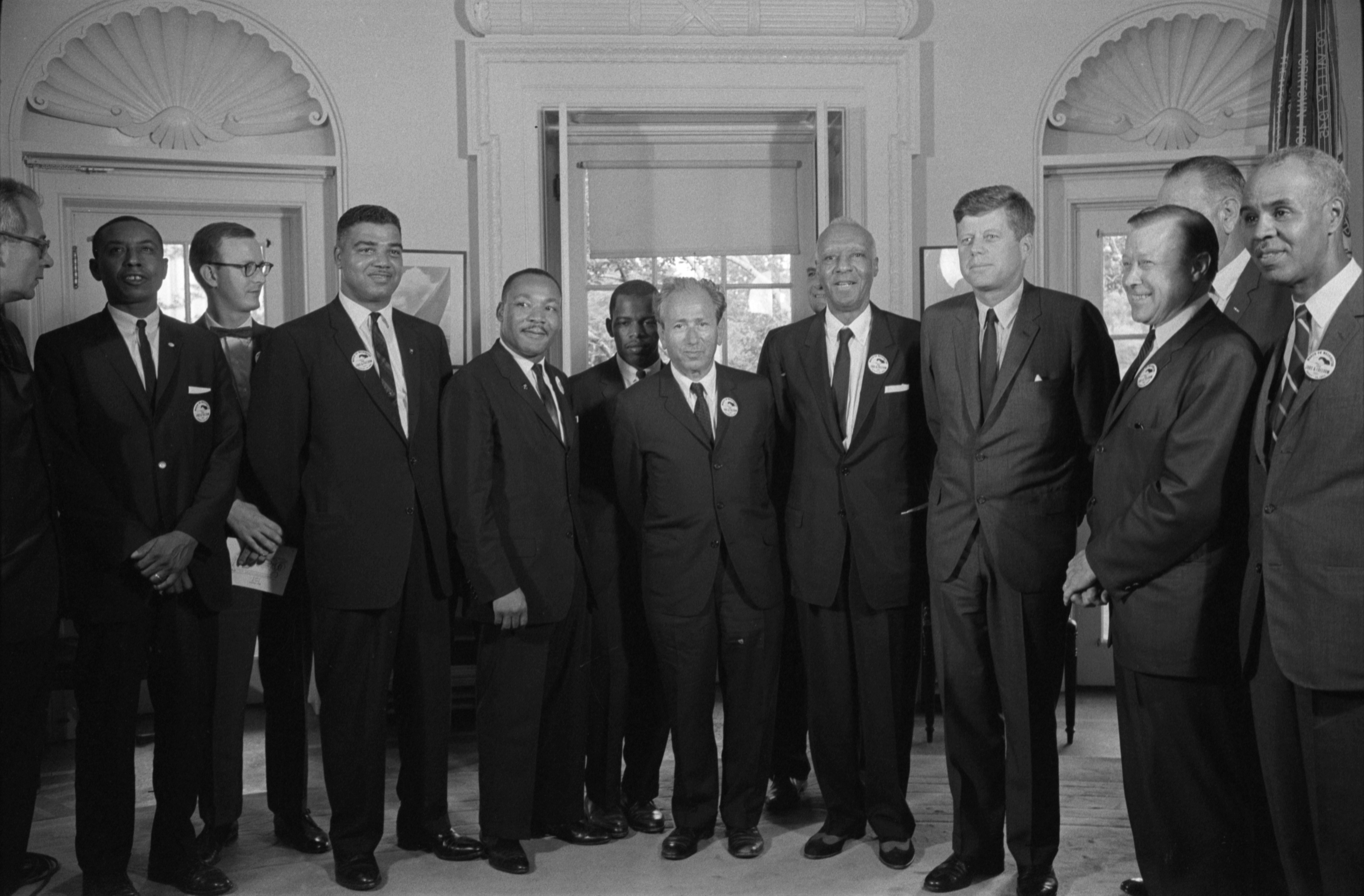
Following the March on Washington on August 28, 1963, civil rights leaders met with President Kennedy and Vice President Johnson to discuss civil rights legislation.

Lobbying support for the Civil Rights Act was coordinated by the Leadership Conference on Civil Rights, a coalition of 70 liberal and labor organizations. The principal lobbyists for the Leadership Conference were civil rights lawyer Joseph L. Rauh Jr. and Clarence Mitchell Jr. of the NAACP.

After the March on Washington for Jobs and Freedom, on August 28, 1963, the organizers visited Kennedy to discuss the civil rights bill. Roy Wilkins, A. Philip Randolph, and Walter Reuther attempted to persuade him to support a provision establishing a Fair Employment Practices Commission that would ban discriminatory practices by all federal agencies, unions, and private companies.

Kennedy called the congressional leaders to the White House in late October 1963 to line up the necessary votes in the House for passage. The bill was reported out of the Judiciary Committee in November 1963 and referred to the Rules Committee, whose chairman, Howard W. Smith, a Democrat and staunch segregationist from Virginia, indicated his intention to keep the bill bottled up indefinitely.

The assassination of United States President John F. Kennedy on November 22, 1963, changed the political situation. Kennedy's successor as president, Lyndon B. Johnson, made use of his experience in legislative politics, along with the bully pulpit he wielded as president, in support of the bill. In his first address to a joint session of Congress on November 27, 1963, Johnson told the legislators, "No memorial oration or eulogy could more eloquently honor President Kennedy's memory than the earliest possible passage of the civil rights bill for which he fought so long."

Judiciary Committee chairman Celler filed a petition to discharge the bill from the Rules Committee which required the support of a majority of House members to move the bill to the floor. Initially, Celler had a difficult time acquiring the signatures necessary, with many Representatives who supported the civil rights bill itself remaining cautious about violating normal House procedure with the rare use of a discharge petition. By the time of the 1963 winter recess, 50 signatures were still needed.

After the return of Congress from its winter recess, however, it was apparent that public opinion in the North favored the bill and that the petition would acquire the necessary signatures. To avert the humiliation of a successful discharge petition, Chairman Smith relented and allowed the bill to pass through the Rules Committee.

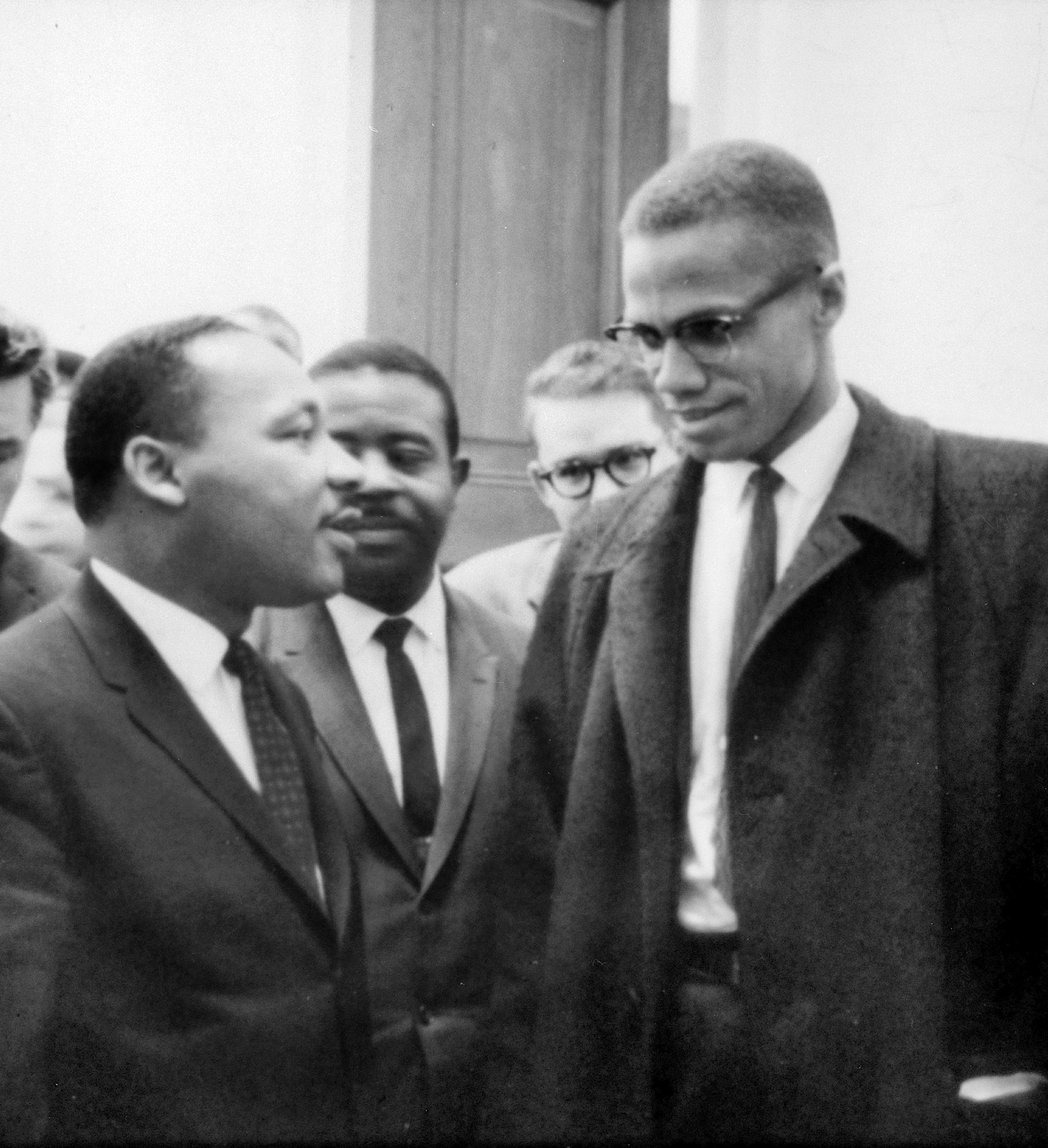
Martin Luther King Jr. and Malcolm X at the United States Capitol on March 26, 1964, listening to the Senate debate on the bill. The two met for only one minute.

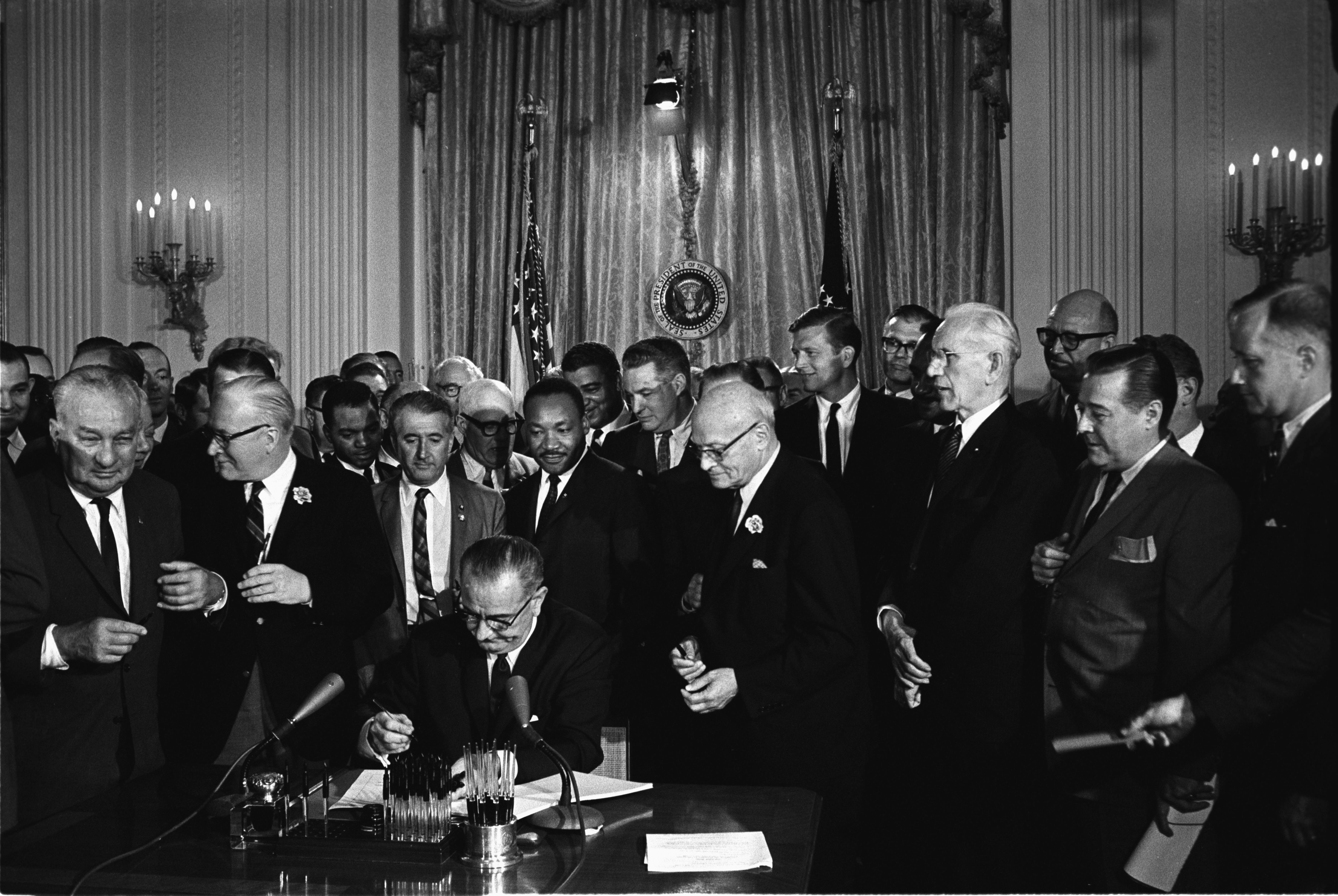
United States President Lyndon B. Johnson signs the Civil Rights Act of 1964. Among the guests behind him is Martin Luther King Jr.

Johnson, who wanted the bill passed as soon as possible, ensured that it would be quickly considered by the Senate.

Normally, the bill would have been referred to the Senate Judiciary Committee, which was chaired by James O. Eastland, a Democrat from Mississippi, whose firm opposition made it seem impossible that the bill would reach the Senate floor. Senate Majority Leader Mike Mansfield took a novel approach to prevent the Judiciary Committee from keeping the bill in limbo: initially waiving a second reading immediately after the first reading, which would have sent it to the Judiciary Committee, he took the unprecedented step of giving the bill a second reading on February 26, 1964, thereby bypassing the Judiciary Committee, and sending it to the Senate floor for immediate debate.

When the bill came before the full Senate for debate on March 30, 1964, the "Southern Bloc" of 18 southern Democratic Senators and lone Republican John Tower of Texas, led by Richard Russell (D-GA), launched a filibuster to prevent its passage. Russell proclaimed, "We will resist to the bitter end any measure or any movement which would tend to bring about social equality and intermingling and amalgamation of the races in our [Southern] states."

Strong opposition to the bill also came from Senator Strom Thurmond, who was still a Democrat at the time: "This so-called Civil Rights Proposals [sic], which the President has sent to Capitol Hill for enactment into law, are unconstitutional, unnecessary, unwise and extend beyond the realm of reason. This is the worst civil-rights package ever presented to the Congress and is reminiscent of the Reconstruction proposals and actions of the radical Republican Congress."

After the filibuster had gone on for 54 days, Senators Mansfield, Hubert Humphrey, Everett Dirksen, and Thomas Kuchel introduced a substitute bill that they hoped would overcome it by combining a sufficient number of Republicans as well as core liberal Democrats. The compromise bill was weaker than the House version as to the government's power in regulating the conduct of private business, but not weak enough to make the House reconsider it.

Senator Robert Byrd ended his filibuster in opposition to the bill on the morning of June 10, 1964, after 14 hours and 13 minutes. Up to then, the measure had occupied the Senate for 60 working days, including six Saturdays. The day before, Humphrey, the bill's manager, concluded that he had the 67 votes required at that time to end the debate and the filibuster. With six wavering senators providing a four-vote victory margin, the final tally stood at 71 to 29. Never before in its entire history had the Senate been able to muster enough votes to defeat a filibuster on a civil rights bill, and only once in the 37 years since 1927 had it agreed to cloture for any measure.

The most dramatic moment during the cloture vote came when Senator Clair Engle (D-CA) was wheeled into the chamber. Suffering from terminal brain cancer, unable to speak, he pointed to his left eye, signifying his affirmative "Aye" vote when his name was called. He died seven weeks later.

On June 19, the compromise bill passed the Senate by a vote of 73–27, quickly passed through the conference committee, which adopted the Senate version of the bill, then was passed by both houses of Congress and signed into law by Johnson on July 2, 1964.

=== Aspects ===
==== Women's rights ====
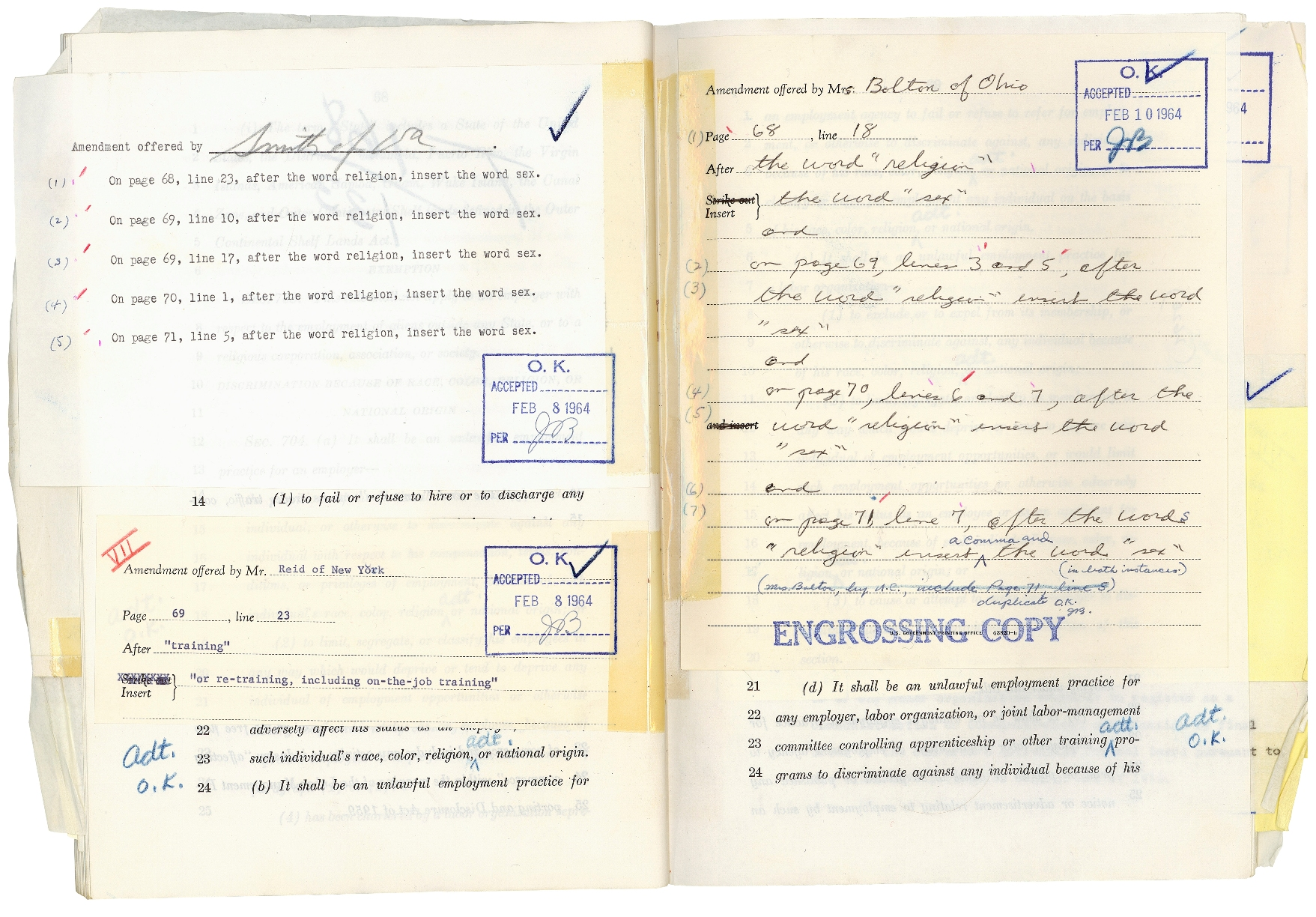
Engrossing copy of H.R. 7152, which added sex to the categories of persons against whom the bill prohibited discrimination, as passed by the House of Representatives

One year earlier, the same Congress had passed the Equal Pay Act of 1963, which prohibited wage differentials based on sex. The prohibition on sex discrimination was added to the Civil Rights Act by Howard W. Smith, a powerful Virginia Democrat who chaired the House Rules Committee and strongly opposed the legislation. Smith's amendment was passed by a teller vote of 168 to 133. Historians debate whether Smith cynically attempted to defeat the bill because he opposed civil rights for Black people and women or attempted to support their rights by broadening the bill to include women. Smith expected that Republicans, who had included equal rights for women in their party's platform since 1944, would probably vote for the amendment. Historians speculate that Smith was trying to embarrass northern Democrats who opposed civil rights for women because labor unions opposed the clause. Representative Carl Elliott of Alabama later said, "Smith didn't give a damn about women's rights", as "he was trying to knock off votes either then or down the line because there was always a hard core of men who didn't favor women's rights", and according to the Congressional Record, laughter greeted Smith when he introduced the amendment.

Smith asserted that he was not joking and sincerely supported the amendment. Along with Representative Martha Griffiths, he was the amendment's chief spokesperson. For 20 years, Smith had sponsored the Equal Rights Amendment (with no linkage to racial issues) in the House because he believed in it. For decades he had been close to the National Woman's Party and its leader Alice Paul, who had been a leading figure in winning the right to vote for women in 1920, co-authored the first Equal Rights Amendment, and had been a chief supporter of equal rights proposals since then. She and other feminists had worked with Smith since 1945 to find a way to include sex as a protected civil rights category, and felt now was the moment. Griffiths argued that the new law would protect black women but not white women, and that that was unfair to white women. Black feminist lawyer Pauli Murray wrote a supportive memorandum at the behest of the National Federation of Business and Professional Women. Griffiths also argued that the laws "protecting" women from unpleasant jobs were actually designed to enable men to monopolize those jobs, and that that was unfair to women who were not allowed to try out for those jobs. The amendment passed with the votes of Republicans and Southern Democrats. The final law passed with the votes of Republicans and Northern Democrats. Thus, as Justice William Rehnquist wrote in Meritor Savings Bank v. Vinson, "The prohibition against discrimination based on sex was added to Title VII at the last minute on the floor of the House of Representatives [...] the bill quickly passed as amended, and we are left with little legislative history to guide us in interpreting the Act's prohibition against discrimination based on 'sex.'"

==== Desegregation ====
One of the bill's opponents' most damaging arguments was that once passed, the bill would require forced busing to achieve certain racial quotas in schools. The bill's proponents, such as Emanuel Celler and Jacob Javits, said it would not authorize such measures. Leading sponsor Hubert Humphrey wrote two amendments specifically designed to outlaw busing. Humphrey said, "if the bill were to compel it, it would be a violation [of the Constitution], because it would be handling the matter on the basis of race and we would be transporting children because of race." Javits said any government official who sought to use the bill for busing purposes "would be making a fool of himself," but two years later the Department of Health, Education and Welfare said that Southern school districts would be required to meet mathematical ratios of students by busing.

=== Aftermath ===
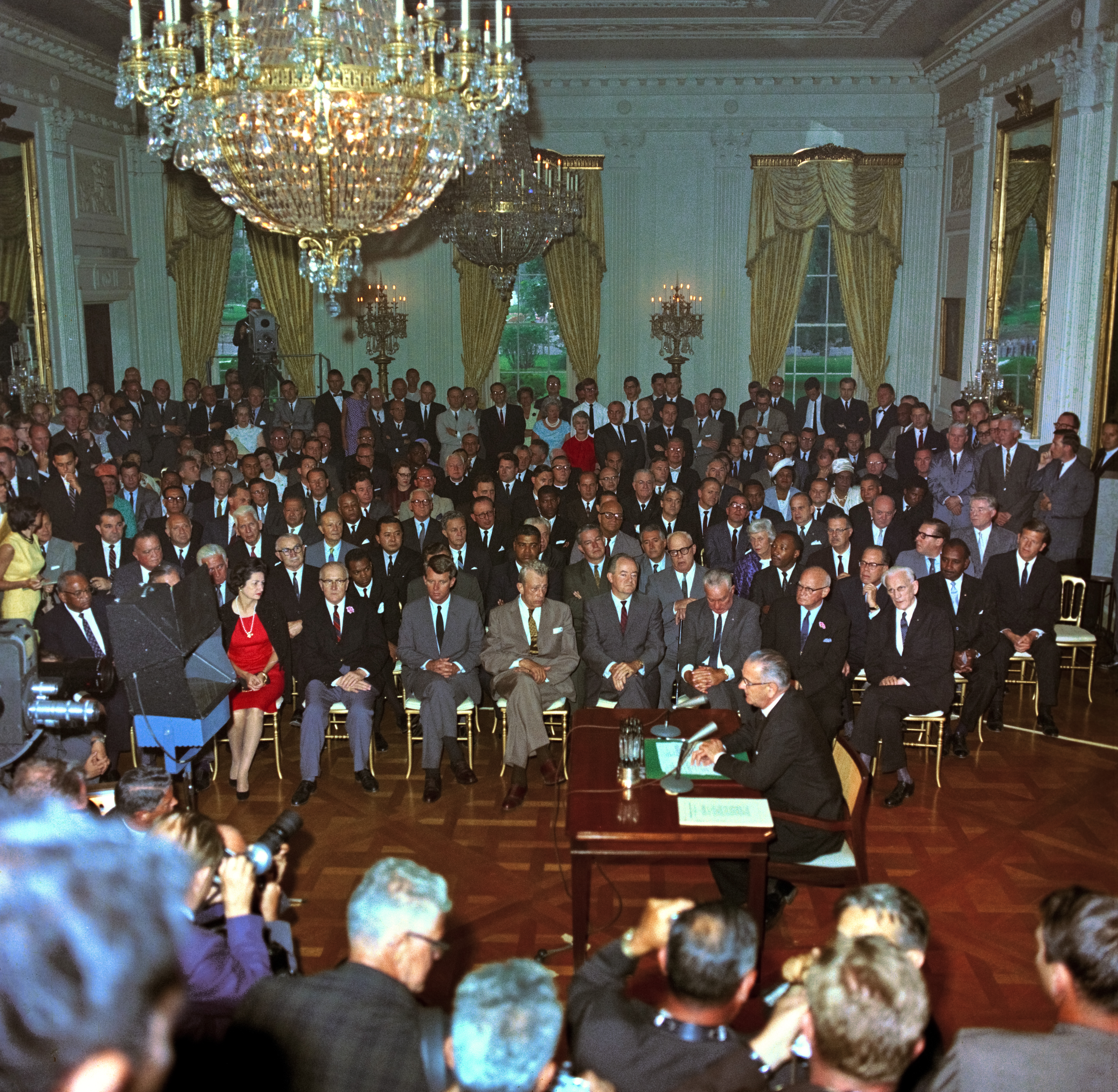
United States President Lyndon B. Johnson speaks to a television camera at the signing of the Civil Rights Act in 1964.

The bill divided both major American political parties and engendered a long-term change in the demographics of the support for each. President Kennedy realized that supporting this bill would risk losing the South's overwhelming support of the Democratic Party. Both Attorney General Robert F. Kennedy and Vice President Johnson had pushed for the introduction of the civil rights legislation. Johnson told Kennedy aide Ted Sorensen that "I know the risks are great and we might lose the South, but those sorts of states may be lost anyway." Senator Richard Russell, Jr. later warned President Johnson that his strong support for the civil rights bill "will not only cost you the South, it will cost you the election". Johnson, however, went on to win the 1964 election by one of the biggest landslides in American history. The South, which had five states swing Republican in 1964, became a stronghold of the Republican Party by the 1990s.

Although majorities in both parties voted for the bill, there were notable exceptions. Though he opposed forced segregation, Republican 1964 presidential candidate, Senator Barry Goldwater of Arizona, voted against the bill, remarking, "You can't legislate morality." Goldwater had supported previous attempts to pass civil rights legislation in 1957 and 1960 as well as the 24th Amendment outlawing the poll tax. He stated that the reason for his opposition to the 1964 bill was Title II, which in his opinion violated individual liberty and states' rights. Democrats and Republicans from the Southern states opposed the bill and led an unsuccessful 60 working day filibuster, including Senators Albert Gore, Sr. (D-TN) and J. William Fulbright (D-AR), as well as Senator Robert Byrd (D-WV), who personally filibustered for 14 hours straight.

There were white business owners who claimed that Congress did not have the constitutional authority to ban segregation in public accommodations. For example, Moreton Rolleston, the owner of a motel in Atlanta, Georgia, said he should not be forced to serve black travelers, saying, "the fundamental question [...] is whether or not Congress has the power to take away the liberty of an individual to run his business as he sees fit in the selection and choice of his customers". Rolleston claimed that the Civil Rights Act of 1964 was a breach of the Fourteenth Amendment and also violated the Fifth and Thirteenth Amendments by depriving him of "liberty and property without due process". In Heart of Atlanta Motel v. United States (1964), the Supreme Court held that Congress drew its authority from the Constitution's Commerce Clause, rejecting Rolleston's claims.

Resistance to the public accommodation clause continued for years on the ground, especially in the South. When local college students in Orangeburg, South Carolina, attempted to desegregate a bowling alley in 1968, they were violently attacked, leading to rioting and what became known as the "Orangeburg massacre." Resistance by school boards continued into the next decade, with the most significant declines in black-white school segregation only occurring at the end of the 1960s and the start of the 1970s in the aftermath of the Green v. County School Board of New Kent County (1968) court decision.

In June 2020, the U.S. Supreme Court ruled in three cases (Bostock v. Clayton County, Altitude Express, Inc. v. Zarda, and R.G. & G.R. Harris Funeral Homes Inc. v. Equal Employment Opportunity Commission) that Title VII of the Civil Rights Act, which barred employers from discriminating on the basis of sex, precluded employers from discriminating on the basis of sexual orientation or gender identity. Afterward, USA Today stated that in addition to LGBTQ employment discrimination, "[t]he court's ruling is likely to have a sweeping impact on federal civil rights laws barring sex discrimination in education, health care, housing and financial credit."

== Voting Rights Act of 1965 ==
The Voting Rights Act of 1965 is a landmark piece of federal legislation in the United States that prohibits racial discrimination in voting. It was signed into law by President Lyndon B. Johnson during the height of the civil rights movement on August 6, 1965, and Congress later amended the Act five times to expand its protections. Designed to enforce the voting rights protected by the Fourteenth and Fifteenth Amendments to the United States Constitution, the Act sought to secure the right to vote for racial minorities throughout the country, especially in the South. According to the U.S. Department of Justice, the Act is considered to be the most effective piece of federal civil rights legislation ever enacted in the country. The National Archives and Records Administration stated: "The Voting Rights Act of 1965 was the most significant statutory change in the relationship between the federal and state governments in the area of voting since the Reconstruction period following the Civil War".

The act contains numerous provisions that regulate elections. The act's "general provisions" provide nationwide protections for voting rights. Section 2 is a general provision that prohibits state and local government from imposing any voting rule that "results in the denial or abridgement of the right of any citizen to vote on account of race or color" or membership in a language minority group. Other general provisions specifically outlaw literacy tests and similar devices that were historically used to disenfranchise racial minorities. The act also contains "special provisions" that apply to only certain jurisdictions. A core special provision is the Section 5 preclearance requirement, which prohibited certain jurisdictions from implementing any change affecting voting without first receiving confirmation from the U.S. attorney general or the U.S. District Court for D.C. that the change does not discriminate against protected minorities. Another special provision requires jurisdictions containing significant language minority populations to provide bilingual ballots and other election materials.

Section 5 and most other special provisions applied to jurisdictions encompassed by the "coverage formula" prescribed in Section 4(b). The coverage formula was originally designed to encompass jurisdictions that engaged in egregious voting discrimination in 1965, and Congress updated the formula in 1970 and 1975. In Shelby County v. Holder (2013), the U.S. Supreme Court struck down the coverage formula as unconstitutional, reasoning that it was obsolete. The court did not strike down Section 5, but without a coverage formula, Section 5 is unenforceable. The jurisdictions which had previously been covered by the coverage formula massively increased the rate of voter registration purges after the Shelby decision.

In 2021, the Brnovich v. Democratic National Committee Supreme Court ruling reinterpreted Section 2 of the Voting Rights Act of 1965, substantially weakening it. The ruling interpreted the "totality of circumstances" language of Section 2 to mean that it does not generally prohibit voting rules that have disparate impact on the groups that it sought to protect, including a rule blocked under Section 5 before the Court inactivated that section in Shelby County v. Holder. In particular, the ruling held that fears of election fraud could justify such rules without evidence that any such fraud had occurred in the past or that the new rule would make elections safer.

Research shows that the Act had successfully and massively increased voter turnout and voter registrations, in particular among black people. The Act has also been linked to concrete outcomes, such as greater public goods provision (such as public education) for areas with higher black population shares, more members of Congress who vote for civil rights-related legislation, and greater Black representation in local offices.

=== Background ===
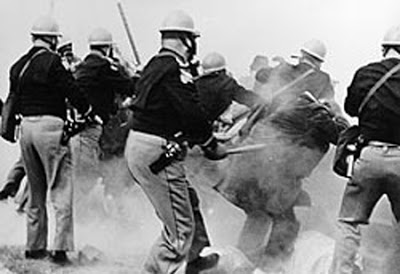
Alabama police in 1965 attack voting rights marchers on "Bloody Sunday", the first of the Selma to Montgomery marches.

Prior to the enactment of the Voting Rights Act of 1965 there were several efforts to stop the disenfranchisement of black voters by Southern states,. Besides the above-mentioned literacy tests and poll taxes other bureaucratic restrictions were used to deny them the right to vote. African Americans also "risked harassment, intimidation, economic reprisals, and physical violence when they tried to register or vote. As a result, very few African Americans were registered voters, and they had very little, if any, political power, either locally or nationally." In the 1950s the Civil Rights Movement increased pressure on the federal government to protect the voting rights of racial minorities. In 1957, Congress passed the first civil rights legislation since Reconstruction: the Civil Rights Act of 1957. This legislation authorized the attorney general to sue for injunctive relief on behalf of persons whose Fifteenth Amendment rights were denied, created the Civil Rights Division within the Department of Justice to enforce civil rights through litigation, and created the Commission on Civil Rights to investigate voting rights deprivations. Further protections were enacted in the Civil Rights Act of 1960, which allowed federal courts to appoint referees to conduct voter registration in jurisdictions that engaged in voting discrimination against racial minorities.

Although these acts helped empower courts to remedy violations of federal voting rights, strict legal standards made it difficult for the Department of Justice to successfully pursue litigation. For example, to win a discrimination lawsuit against a state that maintained a literacy test, the department needed to prove that the rejected voter-registration applications of racial minorities were comparable to the accepted applications of whites. This involved comparing thousands of applications in each of the state's counties in a process that could last months. The department's efforts were further hampered by resistance from local election officials, who would claim to have misplaced the voter registration records of racial minorities, remove registered racial minorities from the electoral rolls, and resign so that voter registration ceased. Moreover, the department often needed to appeal lawsuits several times before the judiciary provided relief because many federal district court judges opposed racial minority suffrage. Thus, between 1957 and 1964, the African-American voter registration rate in the South increased only marginally even though the department litigated 71 voting rights lawsuits. Efforts to stop the disfranchisement by the Southern states had achieved only modest success overall and in some areas had proved almost entirely ineffectual, because the "Department of Justice's efforts to eliminate discriminatory election practices by litigation on a case-by-case basis had been unsuccessful in opening up the registration process; as soon as one discriminatory practice or procedure was proven to be unconstitutional and enjoined, a new one would be substituted in its place and litigation would have to commence anew."

Congress responded to rampant discrimination against racial minorities in public accommodations and government services by passing the Civil Rights Act of 1964. The act included some voting rights protections; it required registrars to equally administer literacy tests in writing to each voter and to accept applications that contained minor errors, and it created a rebuttable presumption that persons with a sixth-grade education were sufficiently literate to vote. However, despite lobbying from civil rights leaders, the Act did not prohibit most forms of voting discrimination. President Lyndon B. Johnson recognized this, and shortly after the 1964 elections in which Democrats gained overwhelming majorities in both chambers of Congress, he privately instructed Attorney General Nicholas Katzenbach to draft "the goddamndest, toughest voting rights act that you can". However, Johnson did not publicly push for the legislation at the time; his advisers warned him of political costs for vigorously pursuing a voting rights bill so soon after Congress had passed the Civil Rights Act of 1964, and Johnson was concerned that championing voting rights would endanger his Great Society reforms by angering Southern Democrats in Congress.

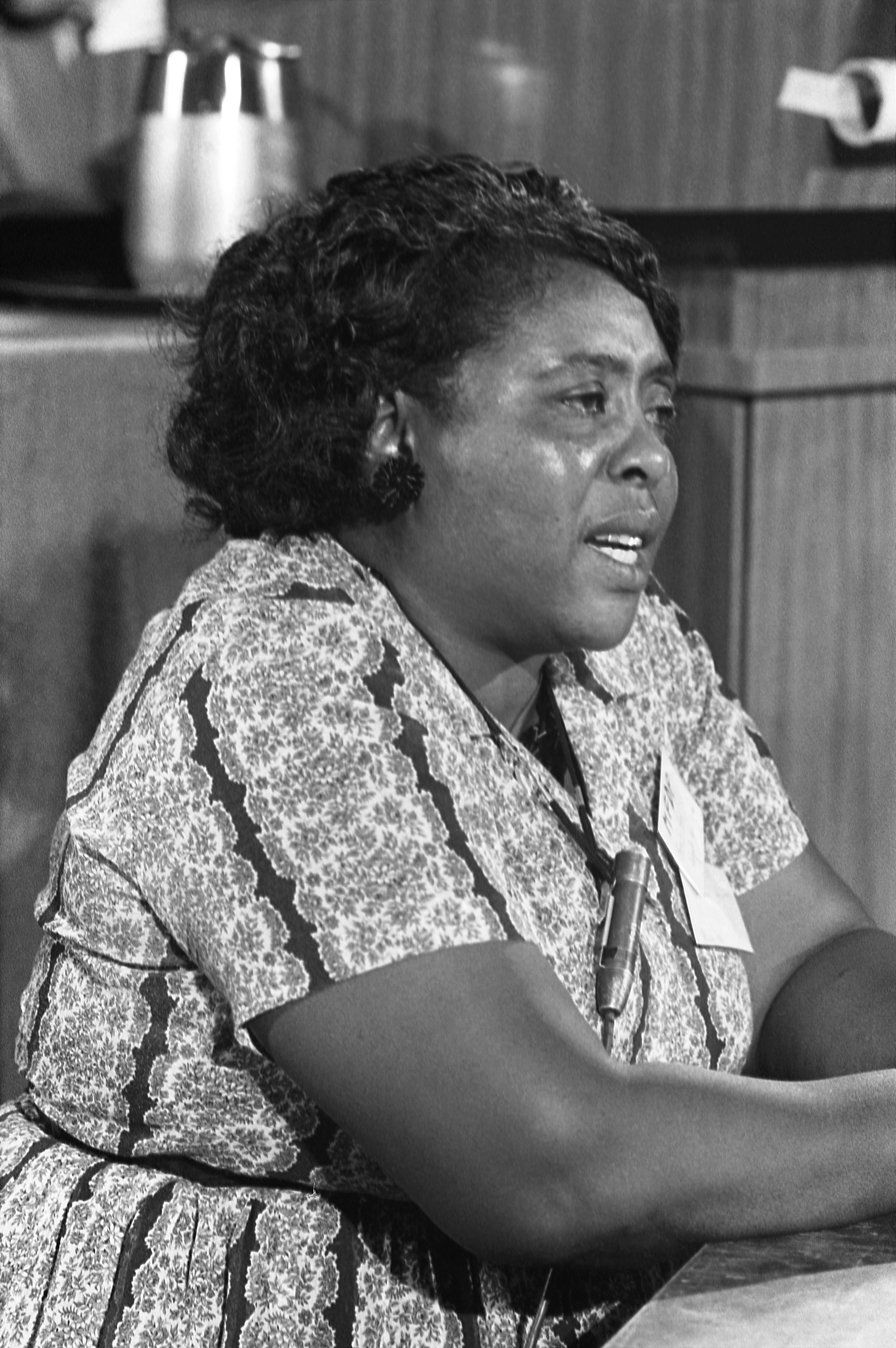
Fannie Lou Hamer, founder of Freedom Farm Cooperative, speaks on behalf of SNCC regarding African-American rights to vote.

Following the 1964 elections, civil rights organizations such as the Southern Christian Leadership Conference (SCLC) and the Student Nonviolent Coordinating Committee (SNCC) pushed for federal action to protect the voting rights of racial minorities. Their efforts culminated in protests in Alabama, particularly in the city of Selma, where County Sheriff Jim Clark's police force violently resisted African-American voter registration efforts. Speaking about the voting rights push in Selma, James Forman of SNCC said: "Our strategy, as usual, was to force the U.S. government to intervene in case there were arrests—and if they did not intervene, that inaction would once again prove the government was not on our side and thus intensify the development of a mass consciousness among blacks. Our slogan for this drive was 'One Man, One Vote.'"

In January 1965, Martin Luther King Jr., James Bevel, and other civil rights leaders organized several peaceful demonstrations in Selma, which were violently attacked by police and white counter-protesters. Throughout January and February, these protests received national media coverage and drew attention to the issue of voting rights. King and other demonstrators were arrested during a march on February 1 for violating an anti-parade ordinance; this inspired similar marches in the following days, causing hundreds more to be arrested. On February 4, civil rights leader Malcolm X gave a militant speech in Selma in which he said that many African Americans did not support King's nonviolent approach; he later privately said that he wanted to frighten whites into supporting King. The next day, King was released and a letter he wrote addressing voting rights, "Letter From A Selma Jail", appeared in The New York Times.

With increasing national attention focused on Selma and voting rights, President Johnson reversed his decision to delay voting rights legislation. On February 6, he announced he would send a proposal to Congress. Johnson did not reveal the proposal's content or disclose when it would come before Congress.

On February 18 in Marion, Alabama, state troopers violently broke up a nighttime voting-rights march during which officer James Bonard Fowler shot and killed young African-American protester Jimmie Lee Jackson, who was unarmed and protecting his mother. Spurred by this event, and at the initiation of Bevel, on March 7 SCLC and SNCC began the first of the Selma to Montgomery marches, in which Selma residents intended to march to Alabama's capital, Montgomery, to highlight voting rights issues and present Governor George Wallace with their grievances. On the first march, demonstrators were stopped by state and county police on horseback at the Edmund Pettus Bridge near Selma. The police shot tear gas into the crowd and trampled protesters. Televised footage of the scene, which became known as "Bloody Sunday", generated outrage across the country. A second march was held on March 9, which became known as "Turnaround Tuesday". That evening, three white Unitarian ministers who participated in the march were attacked on the street and beaten with clubs by four Ku Klux Klan members. The worst injured was Reverend James Reeb from Boston, who died on Thursday, March 11.

In the wake of the events in Selma, President Johnson, addressing a televised joint session of Congress on March 15, called on legislators to enact expansive voting rights legislation. In his speech, he used the words "we shall overcome", adopting the rallying cry of the civil rights movement. The Voting Rights Act of 1965 was introduced in Congress two days later while civil rights leaders, now under the protection of federal troops, led a march of 25,000 people from Selma to Montgomery.

=== Legislative history ===
Efforts to eliminate discriminatory election practices by litigation on a case-by-case basis by the United States Department of Justice had been unsuccessful and existing federal anti-discrimination laws were not sufficient to overcome the resistance by state officials to enforcement of the 15th Amendment. Against this backdrop Congress came to the conclusion that a new comprehensive federal bill was necessary to break the grip of state disfranchisement. The United States Supreme Court explained this in South Carolina v. Katzenbach (1966) with the following words:

In recent years, Congress has repeatedly tried to cope with the problem by facilitating case-by-case litigation against voting discrimination. The Civil Rights Act of 1957 authorized the Attorney General to seek injunctions against public and private interference with the right to vote on racial grounds. Perfecting amendments in the Civil Rights Act of 1960 permitted the joinder of States as parties defendant, gave the Attorney General access to local voting records, and authorized courts to register voters in areas of systematic discrimination. Title I of the Civil Rights Act of 1964 expedited the hearing of voting cases before three-judge courts and outlawed some of the tactics used to disqualify Negroes from voting in federal elections. Despite the earnest efforts of the Justice Department and of many federal judges, these new laws have done little to cure the problem of voting discrimination. [...] The previous legislation has proved ineffective for a number of reasons. Voting suits are unusually onerous to prepare, sometimes requiring as many as 6,000 man-hours spent combing through registration records in preparation for trial. Litigation has been exceedingly slow, in part because of the ample opportunities for delay afforded voting officials and others involved in the proceedings. Even when favorable decisions have finally been obtained, some of the States affected have merely switched to discriminatory devices not covered by the federal decrees, or have enacted difficult new tests designed to prolong the existing disparity between white and Negro registration. Alternatively, certain local officials have defied and evaded court orders or have simply closed their registration offices to freeze the voting rolls. The provision of the 1960 law authorizing registration by federal officers has had little impact on local maladministration, because of its procedural complexities.

In South Carolina v. Katzenbach (1966) the Supreme Court also held that Congress had the power to pass the Voting Rights Act of 1965 under its Enforcement Powers stemming from the Fifteenth Amendment:

Congress exercised its authority under the Fifteenth Amendment in an inventive manner when it enacted the Voting Rights Act of 1965. First: the measure prescribes remedies for voting discrimination which go into effect without any need for prior adjudication. This was clearly a legitimate response to the problem, for which there is ample precedent under other constitutional provisions. See Katzenbach v. McClung, 379 U. S. 294, 379 U. S. 302–304; United States v. Darby, 312 U. S. 100, 312 U. S. 120–121. Congress had found that case-by-case litigation was inadequate to combat widespread and persistent discrimination in voting, because of the inordinate amount of time and energy required to overcome the obstructionist tactics invariably encountered in these lawsuits. After enduring nearly a century of systematic resistance to the Fifteenth Amendment, Congress might well decide to shift the advantage of time and inertia from the perpetrators of the evil to its victims. [...] Second: the Act intentionally confines these remedies to a small number of States and political subdivisions which, in most instances, were familiar to Congress by name. This, too, was a permissible method of dealing with the problem. Congress had learned that substantial voting discrimination presently occurs in certain sections of the country, and it knew no way of accurately forecasting whether the evil might spread elsewhere in the future. In acceptable legislative fashion, Congress chose to limit its attention to the geographic areas where immediate action seemed necessary. See McGowan v. Maryland, 366 U. S. 420, 366 U. S. 427; Salsburg v. Maryland, 346 U. S. 545, 346 U. S. 550–554. The doctrine of the equality of States, invoked by South Carolina, does not bar this approach, for that doctrine applies only to the terms upon which States are admitted to the Union, and not to the remedies for local evils which have subsequently appeared. See Coyle v. Smith, 221 U. S. 559, and cases cited therein.

=== Original bill ===
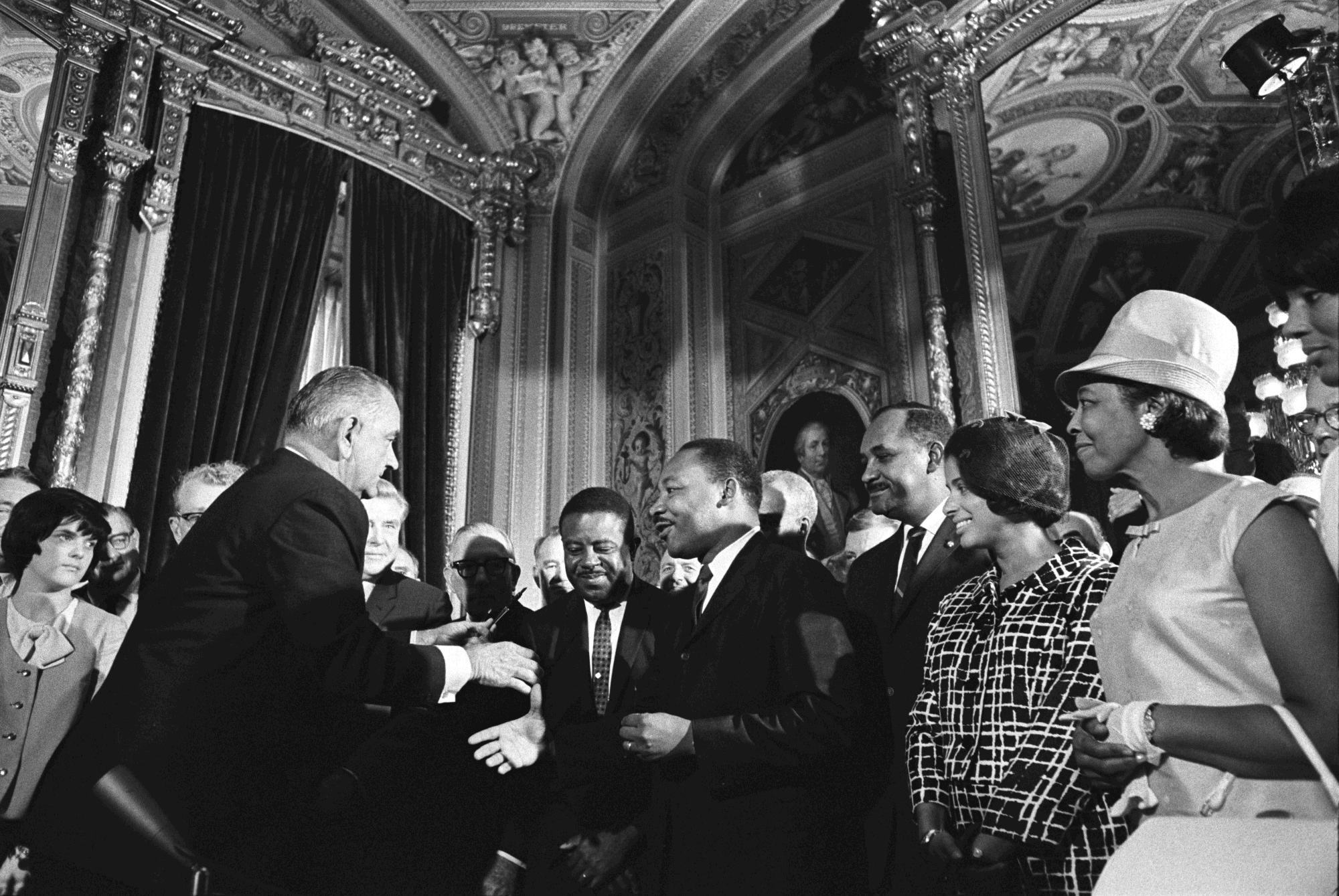
United States President Lyndon B. Johnson, Martin Luther King Jr., and Rosa Parks at the signing of the Voting Rights Act on August 6, 1965

==== Senate ====
The Voting Rights Act of 1965 was introduced in Congress on March 17, 1965, as S. 1564, and it was jointly sponsored by Senate majority leader Mike Mansfield (D-MT) and Senate minority leader Everett Dirksen (R-IL), both of whom had worked with Attorney General Katzenbach to draft the bill's language. Although Democrats held two-thirds of the seats in both chambers of Congress after the 1964 Senate elections, Johnson worried that Southern Democrats would filibuster the legislation because they had opposed other civil rights efforts. He enlisted Dirksen to help gain Republican support. Dirksen did not originally intend to support voting rights legislation so soon after supporting the Civil Rights Act of 1964, but he expressed willingness to accept "revolutionary" legislation after learning about the police violence against marchers in Selma on Bloody Sunday. Given Dirksen's key role in helping Katzenbach draft the legislation, it became known informally as the "Dirksenbach" bill. After Mansfield and Dirksen introduced the bill, 64 additional senators agreed to cosponsor it, with a total 46 Democratic and 20 Republican cosponsors.

The bill contained several special provisions that targeted certain state and local governments: a "coverage formula" that determined which jurisdictions were subject to the Act's other special provisions ("covered jurisdictions"); a "preclearance" requirement that prohibited covered jurisdictions from implementing changes to their voting procedures without first receiving approval from the U.S. attorney general or the U.S. District Court for D.C. that the changes were not discriminatory; and the suspension of "tests or devices", such as literacy tests, in covered jurisdictions. The bill also authorized the assignment of federal examiners to register voters, and of federal observers to monitor elections, to covered jurisdictions that were found to have engaged in egregious discrimination. The bill set these special provisions to expire after five years.

The scope of the coverage formula was a matter of contentious congressional debate. The coverage formula reached a jurisdiction if (1) the jurisdiction maintained a "test or device" on November 1, 1964, and (2) less than 50 percent of the jurisdiction's voting-age residents either were registered to vote on November 1, 1964, or cast a ballot in the November 1964 presidential election. This formula reached few jurisdictions outside the Deep South. To appease legislators who felt that the bill unfairly targeted Southern jurisdictions, the bill included a general prohibition on racial discrimination in voting that applied nationwide. The bill also included provisions allowing a covered jurisdiction to "bail out" of coverage by proving in federal court that it had not used a "test or device" for a discriminatory purpose or with a discriminatory effect during the 5 years preceding its bailout request. Additionally, the bill included a "bail in" provision under which federal courts could subject discriminatory non-covered jurisdictions to remedies contained in the special provisions.

The bill was first considered by the Senate Judiciary Committee, whose chair, Senator James Eastland (D-MS), opposed the legislation with several other Southern senators on the committee. To prevent the bill from dying in committee, Mansfield proposed a motion to require the Judiciary Committee to report the bill out of committee by April 9, which the Senate overwhelmingly passed by a vote of 67 to 13. During the committee's consideration of the bill, Senator Ted Kennedy (D-MA) led an effort to amend the bill to prohibit poll taxes. Although the Twenty-fourth Amendment—which banned the use of poll taxes in federal elections— was ratified a year earlier, Johnson's administration and the bill's sponsors did not include a provision in the voting rights bill banning poll taxes in state elections because they feared courts would strike down the legislation as unconstitutional. Additionally, by excluding poll taxes from the definition of "tests or devices", the coverage formula did not reach Texas or Arkansas, mitigating opposition from those two states' influential congressional delegations. Nonetheless, with the support of liberal committee members, Kennedy's amendment to prohibit poll taxes passed by a 9–4 vote. In response, Dirksen offered an amendment that exempted from the coverage formula any state that had at least 60 percent of its eligible residents registered to vote or that had a voter turnout that surpassed the national average in the preceding presidential election. This amendment, which effectively exempted all states from coverage except Mississippi, passed during a committee meeting in which three liberal members were absent. Dirksen offered to drop the amendment if the poll tax ban were removed. Ultimately, the bill was reported out of committee on April 9 by a 12–4 vote without a recommendation.

On April 22, the full Senate started debating the bill. Dirksen spoke first on the bill's behalf, saying that "legislation is needed if the unequivocal mandate of the Fifteenth Amendment ... is to be enforced and made effective, and if the Declaration of Independence is to be made truly meaningful." Senator Strom Thurmond (D-SC) retorted that the bill would lead to "despotism and tyranny", and Senator Sam Ervin (D-NC) argued that the bill was unconstitutional because it deprived states of their right under Article I, Section 2 of the Constitution to establish voter qualifications and because the bill's special provisions targeted only certain jurisdictions. On May 6, Ervin offered an amendment to abolish the coverage formula's automatic trigger and instead allow federal judges to appoint federal examiners to administer voter registration. This amendment overwhelmingly failed, with 42 Democrats and 22 Republicans voting against it. After lengthy debate, Ted Kennedy's amendment to prohibit poll taxes also failed 49–45 on May 11. However, the Senate agreed to include a provision authorizing the attorney general to sue any jurisdiction, covered or non-covered, to challenge its use of poll taxes. An amendment offered by Senator Robert F. Kennedy (D-NY) to enfranchise English-illiterate citizens who had attained at least a sixth-grade education in a non-English-speaking school also passed by 48–19. Southern legislators offered a series of amendments to weaken the bill, all of which failed.

On May 25, the Senate voted for cloture by a 70–30 vote, thus overcoming the threat of filibuster and limiting further debate on the bill. On May 26, the Senate passed the bill by a 77–19 vote (Democrats 47–16, Republicans 30–2); only senators representing Southern states voted against it.

==== House of Representatives ====
"Remarks on the Signing of the Voting Rights Act of 1965"
Statement by United States President Johnson on August 6, 1965, about the Voting Rights Act of 1965

"Remarks on the Signing of the Voting Rights Act of 1965"
Audio only

Emanuel Celler (D-NY), Chair of the House Judiciary Committee, introduced the Voting Rights Act in the House of Representatives on March 19, 1965, as H.R. 6400. The House Judiciary Committee was the first committee to consider the bill. The committee's ranking Republican, William McCulloch (R-OH), generally supported expanding voting rights, but he opposed both the poll tax ban and the coverage formula, and he led opposition to the bill in committee. The committee eventually approved the bill on May 12, but it did not file its committee report until June 1. The bill included two amendments from subcommittee: a penalty for private persons who interfered with the right to vote and a prohibition of all poll taxes. The poll tax prohibition gained Speaker of the House John McCormack's support. The bill was next considered by the Rules Committee, whose chair, Howard W. Smith (D-VA), opposed the bill and delayed its consideration until June 24, when Celler initiated proceedings to have the bill discharged from committee. Under pressure from the bill's proponents, Smith allowed the bill to be released a week later, and the full House started debating the bill on July 6.

To defeat the Voting Rights Act, McCulloch introduced an alternative bill, H.R. 7896. It would have allowed the attorney general to appoint federal registrars after receiving 25 serious complaints of discrimination against a jurisdiction, and it would have imposed a nationwide ban on literacy tests for persons who could prove they attained a sixth-grade education. McCulloch's bill was co-sponsored by House minority leader Gerald Ford (R-MI) and supported by Southern Democrats as an alternative to the Voting Rights Act. The Johnson administration viewed H.R. 7896 as a serious threat to passing the Voting Rights Act. However, support for H.R. 7896 dissipated after William M. Tuck (D-VA) publicly said he preferred H.R. 7896 because the Voting Rights Act would legitimately ensure that African Americans could vote. His statement alienated most supporters of H.R. 7896, and the bill failed on the House floor by a 171–248 vote on July 9. Later that night, the House passed the Voting Rights Act by a 333–85 vote (Democrats 221–61, Republicans 112–24).

==== Conference committee ====
The chambers appointed a conference committee to resolve differences between the House and Senate versions of the bill. A major contention concerned the poll tax provisions; the Senate version allowed the attorney general to sue states that used poll taxes to discriminate, while the House version outright banned all poll taxes. Initially, the committee members were stalemated. To help broker a compromise, Attorney General Katzenbach drafted legislative language explicitly asserting that poll taxes were unconstitutional and instructed the Department of Justice to sue the states that maintained poll taxes. To assuage concerns of liberal committee members that this provision was not strong enough, Katzenbach enlisted the help of Martin Luther King Jr., who gave his support to the compromise. King's endorsement ended the stalemate, and on July 29, the conference committee reported its version out of committee. The House approved this conference report version of the bill on August 3 by a 328–74 vote (Democrats 217–54, Republicans 111–20), and the Senate passed it on August 4 by a 79–18 vote (Democrats 49–17, Republicans 30–1). On August 6, President Johnson signed the Act into law with King, Rosa Parks, John Lewis, and other civil rights leaders in attendance at the signing ceremony.

=== Amendments ===
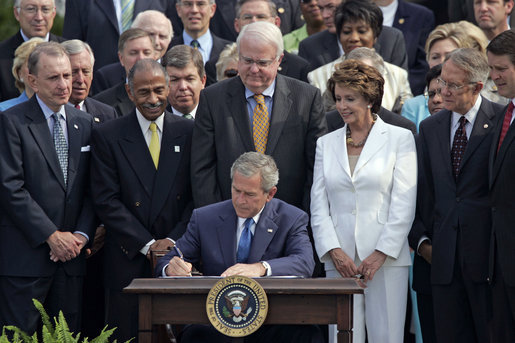
United States President George W. Bush signs amendments to the Act in July 2006.

Congress enacted major amendments to the Act in 1970, 1975, 1982, 1992, and 2006. Each amendment coincided with an impending expiration of some or all of the Act's special provisions. Originally set to expire by 1970, Congress repeatedly reauthorized the special provisions in recognition of continuing voting discrimination. Congress extended the coverage formula and special provisions tied to it, such as the Section 5 preclearance requirement, for five years in 1970, seven years in 1975, and 25 years in both 1982 and 2006. In 1970 and 1975, Congress also expanded the reach of the coverage formula by supplementing it with new 1968 and 1972 trigger dates. Coverage was further enlarged in 1975 when Congress expanded the meaning of "tests or devices" to encompass any jurisdiction that provided English-only election information, such as ballots, if the jurisdiction had a single language minority group that constituted more than five percent of the jurisdiction's voting-age citizens. These expansions brought numerous jurisdictions into coverage, including many outside of the South. To ease the burdens of the reauthorized special provisions, Congress liberalized the bailout procedure in 1982 by allowing jurisdictions to escape coverage by complying with the Act and affirmatively acting to expand minority political participation.

In addition to reauthorizing the original special provisions and expanding coverage, Congress amended and added several other provisions to the Act. For instance, Congress expanded the original ban on "tests or devices" to apply nationwide in 1970, and in 1975, Congress made the ban permanent. Separately, in 1975 Congress expanded the Act's scope to protect language minorities from voting discrimination. Congress defined "language minority" to mean "persons who are American Indian, Asian American, Alaskan Natives or of Spanish heritage." Congress amended various provisions, such as the preclearance requirement and Section 2's general prohibition of discriminatory voting laws, to prohibit discrimination against language minorities. Congress also enacted a bilingual election requirement in Section 203, which requires election officials in certain jurisdictions with large numbers of English-illiterate language minorities to provide ballots and voting information in the language of the language minority group. Originally set to expire after 10 years, Congress reauthorized Section 203 in 1982 for seven years, expanded and reauthorized it in 1992 for 15 years, and reauthorized it in 2006 for 25 years. The bilingual election requirements have remained controversial, with proponents arguing that bilingual assistance is necessary to enable recently naturalized citizens to vote and opponents arguing that the bilingual election requirements constitute costly unfunded mandates.

Several of the amendments responded to judicial rulings with which Congress disagreed. In 1982, Congress amended the Act to overturn the Supreme Court case Mobile v. Bolden (1980), which held that the general prohibition of voting discrimination prescribed in Section 2 prohibited only purposeful discrimination. Congress responded by expanding Section 2 to explicitly ban any voting practice that had a discriminatory effect, regardless of whether the practice was enacted or operated for a discriminatory purpose. The creation of this "results test" shifted the majority of vote dilution litigation brought under the Act from preclearance lawsuits to Section 2 lawsuits. In 2006, Congress amended the Act to overturn two Supreme Court cases: Reno v. Bossier Parish School Board (2000), which interpreted the Section 5 preclearance requirement to prohibit only voting changes that were enacted or maintained for a "retrogressive" discriminatory purpose instead of any discriminatory purpose, and Georgia v. Ashcroft (2003), which established a broader test for determining whether a redistricting plan had an impermissible effect under Section 5 than assessing only whether a minority group could elect its preferred candidates. Since the Supreme Court struck down the coverage formula as unconstitutional in Shelby County v. Holder (2013), several bills have been introduced in Congress to create a new coverage formula and amend various other provisions; none of these bills have passed.

=== Provisions ===
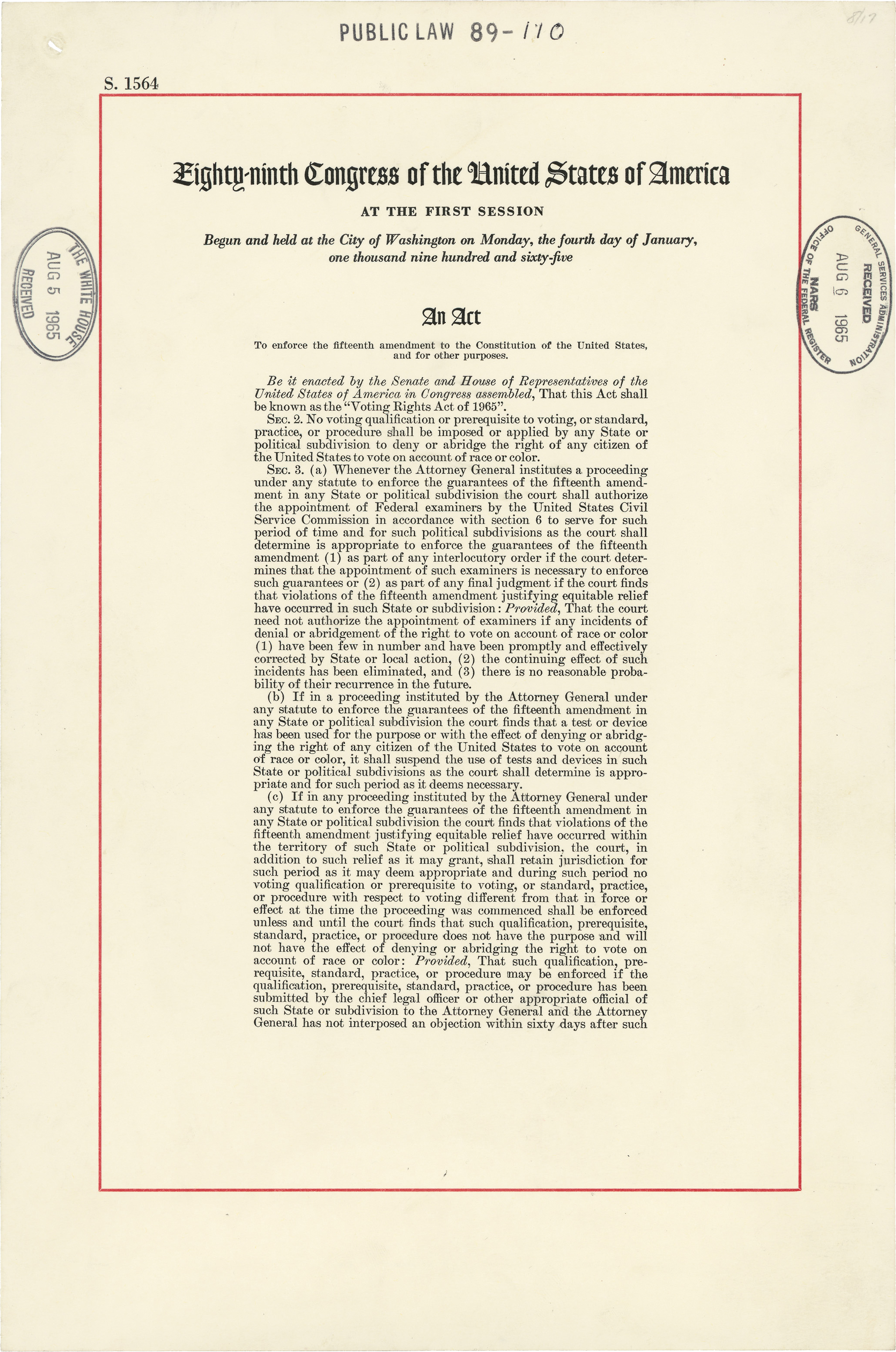
The first page of the Voting Rights Act of 1965

The act contains two types of provisions: "general provisions", which apply nationwide, and "special provisions", which apply to only certain states and local governments. "The Voting Rights Act was aimed at the subtle, as well as the obvious, state regulations which have the effect of denying citizens their right to vote because of their race. Moreover, compatible with the decisions of this Court, the Act gives a broad interpretation to the right to vote, recognizing that voting includes "all action necessary to make a vote effective." 79 Stat. 445, 42 U.S.C. § 19731(c)(1) (1969 ed., Supp. I). See Reynolds v. Sims, 377 U. S. 533, 377 U. S. 555 (1964)." Most provisions are designed to protect the voting rights of racial and language minorities. The term "language minority" means "persons who are American Indian, Asian American, Alaskan Natives or of Spanish heritage." The act's provisions have been colored by numerous judicial interpretations and congressional amendments.

Section 2 prohibits any jurisdiction from implementing a "voting qualification or prerequisite to voting, or standard, practice, or procedure ... in a manner which results in a denial or abridgement of the right ... to vote on account of race," color, or language minority status. Section 2 of the law contains two separate protections against voter discrimination for laws which, in contrast to Section 5 of the law, are already implemented. The first protection is a prohibition of intentional discrimination based on race or color in voting. The second protection is a prohibition of election practices that result in the denial or abridgment of the right to vote based on race or color. If the violation of the second protection is intentional, then this violation is also a violation of the Fifteenth Amendment. The Supreme Court has allowed private plaintiffs to sue to enforce these prohibitions. In Mobile v. Bolden (1980), the Supreme Court held that as originally enacted in 1965, Section 2 simply restated the Fifteenth Amendment and thus prohibited only those voting laws that were intentionally enacted or maintained for a discriminatory purpose. In 1982, Congress amended Section 2 to create a "results" test, which prohibits any voting law that has a discriminatory effect irrespective of whether the law was intentionally enacted or maintained for a discriminatory purpose. The 1982 amendments stipulated that the results test does not guarantee protected minorities a right to proportional representation. In Thornburg v. Gingles (1986) the United States Supreme Court explained with respect to the 1982 amendment for section 2 that the "essence of a Section 2 claim is that a certain electoral law, practice, or structure interacts with social and historical conditions to cause an inequality in the opportunities enjoyed by black and white voters to elect their preferred representatives." The United States Department of Justice declared that section 2 is not only a permanent and nationwide-applying prohibition against discrimination in voting to any voting standard, practice, or procedure that results in the denial or abridgement of the right of any citizen to vote on account of race, color, or membership in a language minority group, but also a prohibition for state and local officials to adopt or maintain voting laws or procedures that purposefully discriminate on the basis of race, color, or membership in a language minority group.

The United States Supreme Court expressed its views regarding Section 2 and its amendment from 1982 in Chisom v. Roemer (1991). Under the amended statute, proof of intent is no longer required to prove a § 2 violation. Now plaintiffs can prevail under § 2 by demonstrating that a challenged election practice has resulted in the denial or abridgement of the right to vote based on color or race. Congress not only incorporated the results test in the paragraph that formerly constituted the entire § 2, but also designated that paragraph as subsection (a) and added a new subsection (b) to make clear that an application of the results test requires an inquiry into "the totality of the circumstances." Section 2(a) adopts a results test, thus providing that proof of discriminatory intent is no longer necessary to establish any violation of the section. Section 2(b) provides guidance about how the results test is to be applied. There is a statutory framework to determine whether a jurisdiction's election law violates the general prohibition from Section 2 in its amended form:

Section 2 prohibits voting practices that "result[] in a denial or abridgment of the right * * * to vote on account of race or color [or language-minority status]," and it states that such a result "is established" if a jurisdiction’s "political processes * * * are not equally open" to members of such a group "in that [they] have less opportunity * * * to participate in the political process and to elect representatives of their choice." 52 U.S.C. 10301. [...] Subsection (b) states in relevant part: A violation of subsection (a) is established if, based on the totality of circumstances, it is shown that the political processes leading to nomination or election in the State or political subdivision are not equally open to participation by members of a class of citizens protected by subsection (a) in that its members have less opportunity than other members of the electorate to participate in the political process and to elect representatives of their choice.

The Office of the Arizona Attorney General stated with respect to the framework to determine whether a jurisdiction's election law violates the general prohibition from Section 2 in its amended form and the reason for the adoption of Section 2 in its amended form:

To establish a violation of amended Section 2, the plaintiff must prove,"based on the totality of circumstances," that the State’s "political processes" are "not equally open to participation by members" of a protected class, "in that its members have less opportunity than other members of the electorate to participate in the political process and to elect representatives of their choice." § 10301(b). That is the "result" that amended Section 2 prohibits: "less opportunity than other members of the electorate," viewing the State’s "political processes" as a whole. The new language was crafted as a compromise designed to eliminate the need for direct evidence of discriminatory intent, which is often difficult to obtain, but without embracing an unqualified "disparate impact" test that would invalidate many legitimate voting procedures. S. REP. NO. 97–417, at 28–29, 31–32, 99 (1982)

In Brnovich v. Democratic National Committee (2021) the United States Supreme Court introduced the means to review Section 2 challenges. The slip opinion stated in its Syllabus section in this regard that "The Court declines in these cases to announce a test to govern all VRA [Section 2] challenges to rules that specify the time, place, or manner for casting ballots. It is sufficient for present purposes to identify certain guideposts that lead to the Court's decision in these cases." The Court laid out these guideposts used to evaluate the state regulations in context of Section 2, which included: the size of the burden created by the rule, the degree which the rule deviates from past practices, the size of the racial imbalance, and the overall level of opportunity afforded voters in considering all election rules.

When determining whether a jurisdiction's election law violates the general prohibition from Section 2 of the VRA, courts have relied on factors enumerated in the Senate Judiciary Committee report associated with the 1982 amendments ("Senate Factors"), including:

1. The history of official discrimination in the jurisdiction that affects the right to vote;
2. The degree to which voting in the jurisdiction is racially polarized;
3. The extent of the jurisdiction's use of majority vote requirements, unusually large electoral districts, prohibitions on bullet voting, and other devices that tend to enhance the opportunity for voting discrimination;
4. Whether minority candidates are denied access to the jurisdiction's candidate slating processes, if any;
5. The extent to which the jurisdiction's minorities are discriminated against in socioeconomic areas, such as education, employment, and health;
6. Whether overt or subtle racial appeals in campaigns exist;
7. The extent to which minority candidates have won elections;
8. The degree that elected officials are unresponsive to the concerns of the minority group; and
9. Whether the policy justification for the challenged law is tenuous.

The report indicates not all or a majority of these factors need to exist for an electoral device to result in discrimination, and it also indicates that this list is not exhaustive, allowing courts to consider additional evidence at their discretion.

No right is more precious in a free country than that of having a voice in the election of those who make the laws under which, as good citizens, we must live. Other rights, even the most basic, are illusory if the right to vote is undermined. Our Constitution leaves no room for classification of people in a way that unnecessarily abridges this right.

— Justice Black on the right to vote as the foundation of democracy in Wesberry v. Sanders (1964).

Section 2 prohibits two types of discrimination: "vote denial", in which a person is denied the opportunity to cast a ballot or to have their vote properly counted, and "vote dilution", in which the strength or effectiveness of a person's vote is diminished. Most Section 2 litigation has concerned vote dilution, especially claims that a jurisdiction's redistricting plan or use of at-large/multimember elections prevents minority voters from casting sufficient votes to elect their preferred candidates. An at-large election can dilute the votes cast by minority voters by allowing a cohesive majority group to win every legislative seat in the jurisdiction. Redistricting plans can be gerrymandered to dilute votes cast by minorities by "packing" high numbers of minority voters into a small number of districts or "cracking" minority groups by placing small numbers of minority voters into a large number of districts.

In Thornburg v. Gingles (1986), the Supreme Court used the term "vote dilution through submergence" to describe claims that a jurisdiction's use of an at-large/multimember election system or gerrymandered redistricting plan diluted minority votes, and it established a legal framework for assessing such claims under Section 2. (Note: In Gingles, the Supreme Court held that the Gingles test applies to claims that an at-large election scheme results in vote dilution. The court later held, in Growe v. Emison, 507 U.S. 25 (1993), that the Gingles test also applies to claims that a redistricting plan results in vote dilution through the arrangement of single-member districts.) Under the Gingles test, plaintiffs must show the existence of three preconditions:

1. The racial or language minority group "is sufficiently numerous and compact to form a majority in a single-member district";
2. The minority group is "politically cohesive" (meaning its members tend to vote similarly); and
3. The "majority votes sufficiently as a bloc to enable it ... usually to defeat the minority's preferred candidate."

The first precondition is known as the "compactness" requirement and concerns whether a majority-minority district can be created. The second and third preconditions are collectively known as the "racially polarized voting" or "racial bloc voting" requirement, and they concern whether the voting patterns of the different racial groups are different from each other. If a plaintiff proves these preconditions exist, then the plaintiff must additionally show, using the remaining Senate Factors and other evidence, that under the "totality of the circumstances", the jurisdiction's redistricting plan or use of at-large or multimember elections diminishes the ability of the minority group to elect candidates of its choice.

Subsequent litigation further defined the contours of these "vote dilution through submergence" claims. In Bartlett v. Strickland (2009), the Supreme Court held that the first Gingles precondition can be satisfied only if a district can be drawn in which the minority group comprises a majority of voting-age citizens. This means that plaintiffs cannot succeed on a submergence claim in jurisdictions where the size of the minority group, despite not being large enough to comprise a majority in a district, is large enough for its members to elect their preferred candidates with the help of "crossover" votes from some members of the majority group. In contrast, the Supreme Court has not addressed whether different protected minority groups can be aggregated to satisfy the Gingles preconditions as a coalition, and lower courts have split on the issue. (Note: The Courts of Appeals in the Fifth Circuit, Eleventh Circuit, and Ninth Circuit have either explicitly held that coalition suits are allowed under Section 2 or assumed that such suits are permissible, while those in the Sixth Circuit and Seventh Circuit have rejected such suits.)

The Supreme Court provided additional guidance on the "totality of the circumstances" test in Johnson v. De Grandy (1994). The court emphasized that the existence of the three Gingles preconditions may be insufficient to prove liability for vote dilution through submergence if other factors weigh against such a determination, especially in lawsuits challenging redistricting plans. In particular, the court held that even where the three Gingles preconditions are satisfied, a jurisdiction is unlikely to be liable for vote dilution if its redistricting plan contains a number of majority-minority districts that is proportional to the minority group's population size. The decision thus clarified that Section 2 does not require jurisdictions to maximize the number of majority-minority districts. The opinion also distinguished the proportionality of majority-minority districts, which allows minorities to have a proportional opportunity to elect their candidates of choice, from the proportionality of election results, which Section 2 explicitly does not guarantee to minorities.

An issue regarding the third Gingles precondition remains unresolved. In Gingles, the Supreme Court split as to whether plaintiffs must prove that the majority racial group votes as a bloc specifically because its members are motivated to vote based on racial considerations and not other considerations that may overlap with race, such as party affiliation. A plurality of justices said that requiring such proof would violate Congress's intent to make Section 2 a "results" test, but Justice White maintained that the proof was necessary to show that an electoral scheme results in racial discrimination. Since Gingles, lower courts have split on the issue. (Note: Courts of Appeals in the Second Circuit and Fourth Circuit have held that such proof is not an absolute requirement for liability but is a relevant additional factor under the "totality of the circumstances" test. In contrast, the Fifth Circuit has held that such proof is a required component of the third precondition.)

The right to vote freely for the candidate of one's choice is of the essence of a democratic society, and any restrictions on that right strike at the heart of representative government. And the right of suffrage can be denied by a debasement or dilution of the weight of a citizen's vote just as effectively as by wholly prohibiting the free exercise of the franchise. [...] Undoubtedly, the right of suffrage is a fundamental matter in a free and democratic society. Especially since the right to exercise the franchise in a free and unimpaired manner is preservative of other basic civil and political rights, any alleged infringement of the right of citizens to vote must be carefully and meticulously scrutinized.

— Chief Justice Earl Warren on the right to vote as the foundation of democracy in Reynolds v. Sims (1964).

Although most Section 2 litigation has involved claims of vote dilution through submergence, courts also have addressed other types of vote dilution under this provision. In Holder v. Hall (1994), the Supreme Court held that claims that minority votes are diluted by the small size of a governing body, such as a one-person county commission, may not be brought under Section 2. A plurality of the court reasoned that no uniform, non-dilutive "benchmark" size for a governing body exists, making relief under Section 2 impossible. Another type of vote dilution may result from a jurisdiction's requirement that a candidate be elected by a majority vote. A majority-vote requirement may cause a minority group's candidate of choice, who would have won the election with a simple plurality of votes, to lose after a majority of voters unite behind another candidate in a runoff election. The Supreme Court has not addressed whether such claims may be brought under Section 2, and lower courts have reached different conclusions on the issue. (Note: The Court of Appeals for the Second Circuit held that challenges to majority-vote requirements under Section 2 are not cognizable, while the Eastern District of Arkansas held the opposite.)

In addition to claims of vote dilution, courts have considered vote denial claims brought under Section 2. The Supreme Court, in Richardson v. Ramirez (1974), held that felony disenfranchisement laws cannot violate Section 2 because, among other reasons, Section 2 of the Fourteenth Amendment permits such laws. A federal district court in Mississippi held that a "dual registration" system that requires a person to register to vote separately for state elections and local elections may violate Section 2 if the system has a racially disparate impact in light of the Senate Factors. Starting in 2013, lower federal courts began to consider various challenges to voter ID laws brought under Section 2.

==== Specific prohibitions ====
The act contains several specific prohibitions on conduct that may interfere with a person's ability to cast an effective vote. One of these prohibitions is prescribed in Section 201, which prohibits any jurisdiction from requiring a person to comply with any "test or device" to register to vote or cast a ballot. The term "test or device" is defined as literacy tests, educational or knowledge requirements, proof of good moral character, and requirements that a person be vouched for when voting. Before the Act's enactment, these devices were the primary tools used by jurisdictions to prevent racial minorities from voting. Originally, the Act suspended tests or devices temporarily in jurisdictions covered by the Section 4(b) coverage formula, but Congress subsequently expanded the prohibition to the entire country and made it permanent. Relatedly, Section 202 prohibits jurisdictions from imposing any "durational residency requirement" that requires persons to have lived in the jurisdiction for more than 30 days before being eligible to vote in a presidential election.

Several further protections for voters are contained in Section 11. Section 11(a) prohibits any person acting under color of law from refusing or failing to allow a qualified person to vote or to count a qualified voter's ballot. Similarly, Section 11(b) prohibits any person from intimidating, harassing, or coercing another person for voting or attempting to vote. Two provisions in Section 11 address voter fraud: Section 11(c) prohibits people from knowingly submitting a false voter registration application to vote in a federal election, and Section 11(e) prohibits voting twice in a federal election.

Finally, under Section 208, a jurisdiction may not prevent anyone who is English-illiterate or has a disability from being accompanied into the ballot box by an assistant of the person's choice. The only exceptions are that the assistant may not be an agent of the person's employer or union.

==== Bail-in ====
Section 3(c) contains a "bail-in" or "pocket trigger" process by which jurisdictions that fall outside the coverage formula of Section 4(b) may become subject to preclearance. Under this provision, if a jurisdiction has racially discriminated against voters in violation of the Fourteenth or Fifteenth Amendments, a court may order the jurisdiction to have future changes to its election laws preapproved by the federal government. Because courts have interpreted the Fourteenth and Fifteenth Amendments to prohibit only intentional discrimination, a court may bail in a jurisdiction only if the plaintiff proves that the jurisdiction enacted or operated a voting practice to purposely discriminate.

Section 3(c) contains its own preclearance language and differs from Section 5 preclearance in several ways. Unlike Section 5 preclearance, which applies to a covered jurisdiction until such time as the jurisdiction may bail out of coverage under Section 4(a), bailed-in jurisdictions remain subject to preclearance for as long as the court orders. Moreover, the court may require the jurisdiction to preclear only particular types of voting changes. For example, the bail-in of New Mexico in 1984 applied for 10 years and required preclearance of only redistricting plans. This differs from Section 5 preclearance, which requires a covered jurisdiction to preclear all of its voting changes.

During the Act's early history, Section 3(c) was little used; no jurisdictions were bailed in until 1975. Between 1975 and 2013, 18 jurisdictions were bailed in, including 16 local governments and the states of Arkansas and New Mexico. Although the Supreme Court held the Section 4(b) coverage formula unconstitutional in Shelby County v. Holder (2013), it did not hold Section 3(c) unconstitutional. Therefore, jurisdictions may continue to be bailed-in and subjected to Section 3(c) preclearance. In the months following Shelby County, courts began to consider requests by the attorney general and other plaintiffs to bail in the states of Texas and North Carolina, and in January 2014 a federal court bailed in Evergreen, Alabama.

A more narrow bail-in process pertaining to federal observer certification is prescribed in Section 3(a). Under this provision, a federal court may certify a non-covered jurisdiction to receive federal observers if the court determines that the jurisdiction violated the voting rights guaranteed by the Fourteenth or Fifteenth Amendments. Jurisdictions certified to receive federal observers under Section 3(a) are not subject to preclearance.

==== Special provisions ====
===== Coverage formula =====
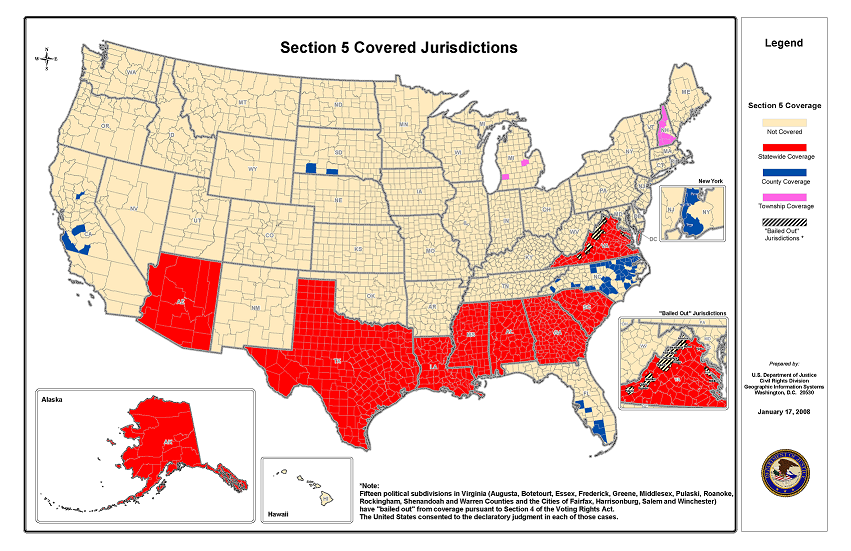
States and counties encompassed by the Act's coverage formula in January 2008 (excluding bailed-out jurisdictions). Several counties subsequently bailed out, but the majority of the map accurately depicts covered jurisdictions before the Supreme Court's decision in Shelby County v. Holder (2013), which declared the coverage formula unconstitutional.

Section 4(b) contains a "coverage formula" that determines which states and local governments may be subjected to the Act's other special provisions (except for the Section 203(c) bilingual election requirements, which fall under a different formula). Congress intended for the coverage formula to encompass the most pervasively discriminatory jurisdictions. A jurisdiction is covered by the formula if:

1. As of November 1, 1964, 1968, or 1972, the jurisdiction used a "test or device" to restrict the opportunity to register and vote; and
2. Less than half of the jurisdiction's eligible citizens were registered to vote on November 1, 1964, 1968, or 1972; or less than half of eligible citizens voted in the presidential election of November 1964, 1968, or 1972.

As originally enacted, the coverage formula contained only November 1964 triggering dates; subsequent revisions to the law supplemented it with the additional triggering dates of November 1968 and November 1972, which brought more jurisdictions into coverage. For purposes of the coverage formula, the term "test or device" includes the same four devices prohibited nationally by Section 201—literacy tests, educational or knowledge requirements, proof of good moral character, and requirements that a person be vouched for when voting—and one further device defined in Section 4(f)(3): in jurisdictions where more than five percent of the citizen voting age population are members of a single language minority group, any practice or requirement by which registration or election materials are provided only in English. The types of jurisdictions that the coverage formula applies to include states and "political subdivisions" of states. Section 14(c)(2) defines "political subdivision" to mean any county, parish, or "other subdivision of a State which conducts registration for voting."

As Congress added new triggering dates to the coverage formula, new jurisdictions were brought into coverage. The 1965 coverage formula included the whole of Alabama, Alaska, Georgia, Louisiana, Mississippi, South Carolina, and Virginia; and some subdivisions (mostly counties) in Arizona, Hawaii, Idaho, and North Carolina. The 1968 coverage resulted in the partial coverage of Alaska, Arizona, California, Connecticut, Idaho, Maine, Massachusetts, New Hampshire, New York, and Wyoming. Connecticut, Idaho, Maine, Massachusetts, and Wyoming filed successful "bailout" lawsuits, as also provided by section 4. The 1972 coverage covered the whole of Alaska, Arizona, and Texas, and parts of California, Florida, Michigan, New York, North Carolina, and South Dakota.

The special provisions of the Act were initially due to expire in 1970, and Congress renewed them for another five years. In 1975, the Act's special provisions were extended for another seven years. In 1982, the coverage formula was extended again, this time for 25 years, but no changes were made to the coverage formula, and in 2006, the coverage formula was again extended for 25 years.

Throughout its history, the coverage formula remained controversial because it singled out certain jurisdictions for scrutiny, most of which were in the Deep South. In Shelby County v. Holder (2013), the Supreme Court declared the coverage formula unconstitutional because the criteria used were outdated and thus violated principles of equal state sovereignty and federalism. The other special provisions that are dependent on the coverage formula, such as the Section 5 preclearance requirement, remain valid law. However, without a valid coverage formula, these provisions are unenforceable.

===== Preclearance requirement =====
Section 5 requires that covered jurisdictions receive federal approval, known as "preclearance", before implementing changes to their election laws. A covered jurisdiction has the burden of proving that the change does not have the purpose or effect of discriminating on the basis of race or language minority status; if the jurisdiction fails to meet this burden, the federal government will deny preclearance and the jurisdiction's change will not go into effect. The Supreme Court broadly interpreted Section 5's scope in Allen v. State Board of Election (1969), holding that any change in a jurisdiction's voting practices, even if minor, must be submitted for preclearance. The court also held that if a jurisdiction fails to have its voting change precleared, private plaintiffs may sue the jurisdiction in the plaintiff's local district court before a three-judge panel. (Note: The Supreme Court subsequently held that plaintiffs may alternatively bring Section 5 enforcement actions in state courts.) In these Section 5 "enforcement actions", a court considers whether the jurisdiction made a covered voting change, and if so, whether the change had been precleared. If the jurisdiction improperly failed to obtain preclearance, the court will order the jurisdiction to obtain preclearance before implementing the change. However, the court may not consider the merits of whether the change should be approved.

Jurisdictions may seek preclearance through either an "administrative preclearance" process or a "judicial preclearance" process. If a jurisdiction seeks administrative preclearance, the attorney general will consider whether the proposed change has a discriminatory purpose or effect. After the jurisdiction submits the proposed change, the attorney general has 60 days to interpose an objection to it. The 60-day period may be extended an additional 60 days if the jurisdiction later submits additional information. If the attorney general interposes an objection, then the change is not precleared and may not be implemented. The attorney general's decision is not subject to judicial review, but if the attorney general interposes an objection, the jurisdiction may independently seek judicial preclearance, and the court may disregard the attorney general's objection at its discretion. If a jurisdiction seeks judicial preclearance, it must file a declaratory judgment action against the attorney general in the U.S. District Court for D.C. A three-judge panel will consider whether the voting change has a discriminatory purpose or effect, and the losing party may appeal directly to the Supreme Court. Private parties may intervene in judicial preclearance lawsuits.

In several cases, the Supreme Court has addressed the meaning of "discriminatory effect" and "discriminatory purpose" for Section 5 purposes. In Beer v. United States (1976), the court held that for a voting change to have a prohibited discriminatory effect, it must result in "retrogression" (backsliding). Under this standard, a voting change that causes discrimination, but does not result in more discrimination than before the change was made, cannot be denied preclearance for having a discriminatory effect. For example, replacing a poll tax with an equally expensive voter registration fee is not a "retrogressive" change because it causes equal discrimination, not more. Relying on the Senate report for the Act, the court reasoned that the retrogression standard was the correct interpretation of the term "discriminatory effect" because Section 5's purpose is " 'to insure that [the gains thus far achieved in minority political participation] shall not be destroyed through new [discriminatory] procedures' ". The retrogression standard applies irrespective of whether the voting change allegedly causes vote denial or vote dilution.

In 2003, the Supreme Court held in Georgia v. Ashcroft that courts should not determine that a new redistricting plan has a retrogressive effect solely because the plan decreases the number of minority-majority districts. The court emphasized that judges should analyze various other factors under the "totality of the circumstances", such as whether the redistricting plan increases the number of "influence districts" in which a minority group is large enough to influence (but not decide) election outcomes. In 2006, Congress overturned this decision by amending Section 5 to explicitly state that "diminishing the ability [of a protected minority] to elect their preferred candidates of choice denies or abridges the right to vote within the meaning of" Section 5. Uncertainty remains as to what this language precisely means and how courts may interpret it.

Before 2000, the "discriminatory purpose" prong of Section 5 was understood to mean any discriminatory purpose, which is the same standard used to determine whether discrimination is unconstitutional. In Reno v. Bossier Parish (Bossier Parish II) (2000), the Supreme Court extended the retrogression standard, holding that for a voting change to have a "discriminatory purpose" under Section 5, the change must have been implemented for a retrogressive purpose. Therefore, a voting change intended to discriminate against a protected minority was permissible under Section 5 so long as the change was not intended to increase existing discrimination. This change significantly reduced the number of instances in which preclearance was denied based on discriminatory purpose. In 2006, Congress overturned Bossier Parish II by amending Section 5 to explicitly define "purpose" to mean "any discriminatory purpose."

===== Federal examiners and observers =====
Until the 2006 amendments to the Act, Section 6 allowed the appointment of "federal examiners" to oversee certain jurisdictions' voter registration functions. Federal examiners could be assigned to a covered jurisdiction if the attorney general certified that

1. The Department of Justice received 20 or more meritorious complaints that the covered jurisdiction denied its residents the right to vote based on race or language minority status; or
2. The assignment of federal examiners was otherwise necessary to enforce the voting rights guaranteed by the Fourteenth or Fifteenth Amendments.

Federal examiners had the authority to register voters, examine voter registration applications, and maintain voter rolls. The goal of the federal examiner provision was to prevent jurisdictions from denying protected minorities the right to vote by engaging in discriminatory behavior in the voter registration process, such as refusing to register qualified applicants, purging qualified voters from the voter rolls, and limiting the hours during which persons could register. Federal examiners were used extensively in the years following the Act's enactment, but their importance waned over time; 1983 was the last year that a federal examiner registered a person to vote. In 2006, Congress repealed the provision.

Under the Act's original framework, in any jurisdiction certified for federal examiners, the attorney general could additionally require the appointment of "federal observers". By 2006, the federal examiner provision was used solely as a means to appoint federal observers. When Congress repealed the federal examiner provision in 2006, Congress amended Section 8 to allow for the assignment of federal observers to jurisdictions that satisfied the same certification criteria that had been used to appoint federal examiners.

Federal observers are tasked with observing poll worker and voter conduct at polling places during an election and observing election officials tabulate the ballots. The goal of the federal observer provision is to facilitate minority voter participation by deterring and documenting instances of discriminatory conduct in the election process, such as election officials denying qualified minority persons the right to cast a ballot, intimidation or harassment of voters on election day, or improper vote counting. Discriminatory conduct that federal observers document may also serve as evidence in subsequent enforcement lawsuits. Between 1965 and the Supreme Court's 2013 decision in Shelby County v. Holder to strike down the coverage formula, the attorney general certified 153 local governments across 11 states. Because of time and resource constraints, federal observers are not assigned to every certified jurisdiction for every election. Separate provisions allow for a certified jurisdiction to "bail out" of its certification.

===== Bailout =====
Under Section 4(a), a covered jurisdiction may seek exemption from coverage through a process called "bailout." To achieve an exemption, a covered jurisdiction must obtain a declaratory judgment from a three-judge panel of the District Court for D.C. that the jurisdiction is eligible to bail out. As originally enacted, a covered jurisdiction was eligible to bail out if it had not used a test or device with a discriminatory purpose or effect during the 5 years preceding its bailout request. Therefore, a jurisdiction that requested to bail out in 1967 would have needed to prove that it had not misused a test or device since at least 1962. Until 1970, this effectively required a covered jurisdiction to prove that it had not misused a test or device since before the Act was enacted five years earlier in 1965, making it impossible for many covered jurisdictions to bail out. However, Section 4(a) also prohibited covered jurisdictions from using tests or devices in any manner, discriminatory or otherwise; hence, under the original act, a covered jurisdiction would become eligible for bailout in 1970 by simply complying with this requirement. But in the course of amending the Act in 1970 and 1975 to extend the special provisions, Congress also extended the period of time that a covered jurisdiction must not have misused a test or device to 10 years and then to 17 years, respectively. These extensions continued the effect of requiring jurisdictions to prove that they had not misused a test or device since before the Act's enactment in 1965.

In 1982, Congress amended Section 4(a) to make bailout easier to achieve in two ways. First, Congress provided that if a state is covered, local governments in that state may bail out even if the state is ineligible to bail out. Second, Congress liberalized the eligibility criteria by replacing the 17-year requirement with a new standard, allowing a covered jurisdiction to bail out by proving that in the 10 years preceding its bailout request:

1. The jurisdiction did not use a test or device with a discriminatory purpose or effect;
2. No court determined that the jurisdiction denied or abridged the right to vote based on racial or language minority status;
3. The jurisdiction complied with the preclearance requirement;
4. The federal government did not assign federal examiners to the jurisdiction;
5. The jurisdiction abolished discriminatory election practices; and
6. The jurisdiction took affirmative steps to eliminate voter intimidation and expand voting opportunities for protected minorities.

Additionally, Congress required jurisdictions seeking bailout to produce evidence of minority registration and voting rates, including how these rates have changed over time and in comparison to the registration and voting rates of the majority. If the court determines that the covered jurisdiction is eligible for bailout, it will enter a declaratory judgment in the jurisdiction's favor. The court will retain jurisdiction for the following 10 years and may order the jurisdiction back into coverage if the jurisdiction subsequently engages in voting discrimination.

The 1982 amendment to the bailout eligibility standard went into effect on August 5, 1984. Between that date and 2013, 196 jurisdictions bailed out of coverage through 38 bailout actions; in each instance, the attorney general consented to the bailout request. Between that date and 2009, all jurisdictions that bailed out were located in Virginia. In 2009, a municipal utility jurisdiction in Texas bailed out after the Supreme Court's opinion in Northwest Austin Municipal Utility District No. 1 v. Holder (2009), which held that local governments that do not register voters have the ability to bail out. After this ruling, jurisdictions succeeded in at least 20 bailout actions before the Supreme Court held in Shelby County v. Holder (2013) that the coverage formula was unconstitutional.

Separate provisions allow a covered jurisdiction that has been certified to receive federal observers to bail out of its certification alone. Under Section 13, the attorney general may terminate the certification of a jurisdiction if 1) more than 50 percent of the jurisdiction's minority voting age population is registered to vote, and 2) there is no longer reasonable cause to believe that residents may experience voting discrimination. Alternatively, the District Court for D.C. may order the certification terminated.

===== Bilingual election requirements =====
Two provisions require certain jurisdictions to provide election materials to voters in multiple languages: Section 4(f)(4) and Section 203(c). A jurisdiction covered by either provision must provide all materials related to an election—such as voter registration materials, ballots, notices, and instructions—in the language of any applicable language minority group residing in the jurisdiction. Language minority groups protected by these provisions include Asian Americans, Hispanics, Native Americans, and Native Alaskans. Congress enacted the provisions to break down language barriers and combat pervasive language discrimination against the protected groups.

Section 4(f)(4) applies to any jurisdiction encompassed by the Section 4(b) coverage formula where more than five percent of the citizen voting age population are members of a single language minority group. Section 203(c) contains a formula that is separate from the Section 4(b) coverage formula, and therefore jurisdictions covered solely by 203(c) are not subject to the Act's other special provisions, such as preclearance. The Section 203(c) formula encompasses jurisdictions where the following conditions exist:

1. A single language minority is present that has an English-illiteracy rate higher than the national average; and
2. Either:
  1. The number of "limited-English proficient" members of the language minority group is at least 10,000 voting-age citizens or large enough to comprise at least five percent of the jurisdiction's voting-age citizen population; or
  2. The jurisdiction is a political subdivision that contains an Indian reservation, and more than five percent of the jurisdiction's American Indian or Alaska Native voting-age citizens are members of a single language minority and are limited-English proficient.

Section 203(b) defines "limited-English proficient" as being "unable to speak or understand English adequately enough to participate in the electoral process". Determinations as to which jurisdictions satisfy the Section 203(c) criteria occur once a decade following completion of the decennial census; at these times, new jurisdictions may come into coverage while others may have their coverage terminated. Additionally, under Section 203(d), a jurisdiction may "bail out" of Section 203(c) coverage by proving in federal court that no language minority group within the jurisdiction has an English illiteracy rate that is higher than the national illiteracy rate. After the 2010 census, 150 jurisdictions across 25 states were covered under Section 203(c), including statewide coverage of California, Texas, and Florida.

=== Impact ===
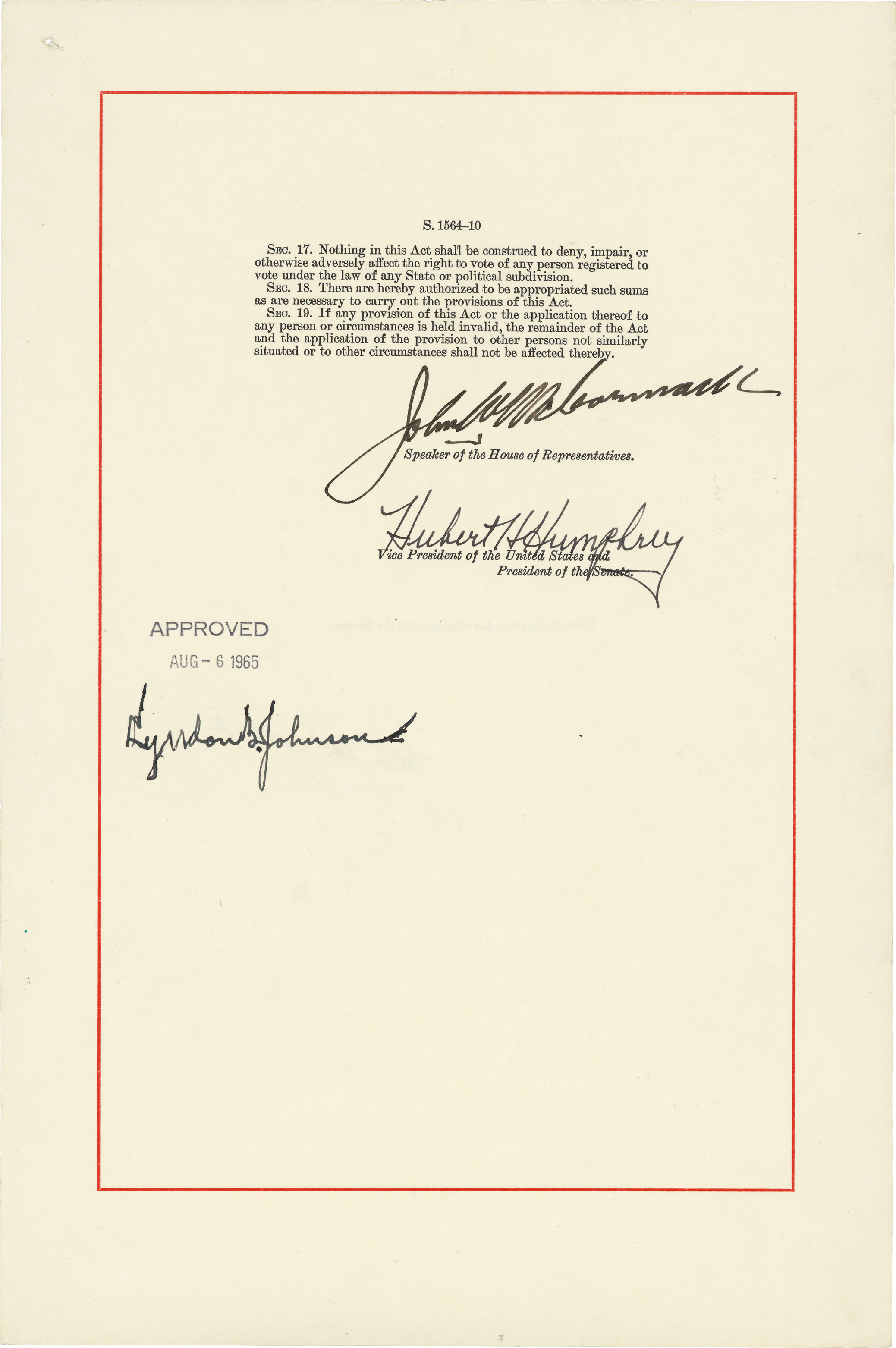
Final page of the Voting Rights Act of 1965, signed by United States President Lyndon B. Johnson, President of the Senate Hubert Humphrey, and Speaker of the House John McCormack

"The Voting Rights Act had an immediate impact. By the end of 1965, a quarter of a million new Black voters had been registered, one-third by federal examiners. By the end of 1966, only four out of 13 southern states had fewer than 50 percent of African Americans registered to vote." After its enactment in 1965, the law immediately decreased racial discrimination in voting. The suspension of literacy tests and the assignments of federal examiners and observers allowed for high numbers of racial minorities to register to vote. Nearly 250,000 African Americans registered in 1965, one-third of whom were registered by federal examiners. In covered jurisdictions, less than one-third (29.3 percent) of the African American population was registered in 1965; by 1967, this number increased to more than half (52.1 percent), and a majority of African American residents became registered to vote in 9 of the 13 Southern states. Similar increases were seen in the number of African Americans elected to office: between 1965 and 1985, African Americans elected as state legislators in the 11 former Confederate states increased from 3 to 176. Nationwide, the number of African American elected officials increased from 1,469 in 1970 to 4,912 in 1980. By 2011, the number was approximately 10,500. Similarly, registration rates for language minority groups increased after Congress enacted the bilingual election requirements in 1975 and amended them in 1992. In 1973, the percent of Hispanics registered to vote was 34.9 percent; by 2006, that amount nearly doubled. The number of Asian Americans registered to vote in 1996 increased 58 percent by 2006.

After the Act's initial success in combating tactics designed to deny minorities access to the polls, the Act became predominately used as a tool to challenge racial vote dilution. Starting in the 1970s, the attorney general commonly raised Section 5 objections to voting changes that decreased the effectiveness of racial minorities' votes, including discriminatory annexations, redistricting plans, and election methods such as at-large election systems, runoff election requirements, and prohibitions on bullet voting. In total, 81 percent (2,541) of preclearance objections made between 1965 and 2006 were based on vote dilution. Claims brought under Section 2 have also predominately concerned vote dilution. Between the 1982 creation of the Section 2 results test and 2006, at least 331 Section 2 lawsuits resulted in published judicial opinions. In the 1980s, 60 percent of Section 2 lawsuits challenged at-large election systems; in the 1990s, 37.2 percent challenged at-large election systems and 38.5 percent challenged redistricting plans. Overall, plaintiffs succeeded in 37.2 percent of the 331 lawsuits, and they were more likely to succeed in lawsuits brought against covered jurisdictions.

By enfranchising racial minorities, the Act facilitated a political realignment of the Democratic and Republican parties. Between 1890 and 1965, Black disenfranchisement enabled the Democratic Party to dominate Southern politics. After Johnson signed the Act into law, newly enfranchised Black voters began to push the Democratic Party to the left throughout the South; this in turn pushed Southern white conservatives to switch their support from the Democratic to Republican party. This trend caused the two parties to ideologically polarize, with the Democratic Party becoming more Liberal and the Republican Party becoming more Conservative. The trends also created competition between the two parties, which Republicans capitalized on by implementing the Southern strategy. Over the subsequent decades, the creation of majority-minority districts to remedy racial vote dilution claims also contributed to these developments. By packing liberal-leaning racial minorities into small numbers of majority-minority districts, large numbers of surrounding districts became more solidly white, conservative, and Republican. While this increased the elected representation of racial minorities as intended, it also decreased white Democratic representation and increased the representation of Republicans overall. By the mid-1990s, these trends culminated in a political realignment: the Democratic Party and the Republican Party became more ideologically polarized and defined as liberal and conservative parties, respectively; and both parties came to compete for electoral success in the South, with the Republican Party controlling most of Southern politics.

Research shows that the Act successfully and massively increased voter turnout and voter registration, in particular among African Americans. The act has also been linked to concrete outcomes, such as greater public goods provision (such as public education) for areas with higher black population shares and more members of Congress who vote for civil rights-related legislation. A 2016 study in the American Journal of Political Science found "that members of Congress who represented jurisdictions subject to the preclearance requirement were substantially more supportive of civil rights-related legislation than legislators who did not represent covered jurisdictions." A 2013 Quarterly Journal of Economics study found that the Act boosted voter turnout and increases in public goods transfers from state governments to localities with higher black population. A 2018 study in The Journal of Politics found that Section 5 of the 1965 Voting Rights Act "increased black voter registration by 14–19 percentage points, white registration by 10–13 percentage points, and overall voter turnout by 10–19 percentage points. Additional results for Democratic vote share suggest that some of this overall increase in turnout may have come from reactionary whites." A 2019 study in the American Economic Journal found that preclearance substantially increased turnout among minorities, even as far as to 2012 (the year prior to the Supreme Court ruling ending preclearance). The study estimates that preclearance led to an increase in minority turnout of 17 percentage points. A 2020 study found that the jurisdictions which had previously been covered by preclearance massively increased the rate of voter registration purges after the 2013 United States Supreme Court Shelby County v. Holder decision in which the "coverage formula" in Section 4(b) of the VRA that determined which jurisdictions had to presubmit changes in their election policies for federal approval was struck down. Another 2020 study found that VRA coverage halved the incidence and the onset of political violence.

In a 5–4 decision in Shelby County v. Holder (2013), the Supreme Court struck down Section 4(b) as unconstitutional. The court reasoned that the coverage formula violates the constitutional principles of "equal sovereignty of the states" and federalism because its disparate treatment of the states is "based on 40 year-old facts having no logical relationship to the present day", rendering the formula outdated. The court did not strike down Section 5, but without Section 4(b), no jurisdiction may be subject to Section 5 preclearance unless Congress enacts a new coverage formula. After the decision, several states that were fully or partially covered—including Texas, Mississippi, North Carolina, and South Carolina—implemented laws that were previously denied preclearance. This prompted new legal challenges to these laws under other provisions unaffected by the court's decision, such as Section 2. Research has shown that the coverage formula and the requirement of preclearance substantially increased turnout among racial minorities, even as far as the year before Shelby County. Some jurisdictions that had previously been covered by the coverage formula increased the rate of voter registration purges after Shelby County. On July 1, 2021, the Act's preclearance requirements were further weakened at the state and local level following the Brnovich v. Democratic National Committee in a 6-3 Supreme Court ruling which held that Section 2 preclearance provisions could not apply to out-of-precinct voting or ballot collecting.

== Civil Rights Act of 1968 ==
The Civil Rights Act of 1968 (Pub. L. 90–284, 82 Stat. 73, enacted April 11, 1968) is a landmark law in the United States signed into law by United States President Lyndon B. Johnson during the King assassination riots.

Titles II through VII comprise the Indian Civil Rights Act, which applies to the Native American tribes of the United States and makes many but not all of the guarantees of the U.S. Bill of Rights applicable within the tribes. (That Act appears today in Title 25, sections 1301 to 1303 of the United States Code).

Titles VIII and IX are commonly known as the Fair Housing Act, which was meant as a follow-up to the Civil Rights Act of 1964. (This is different legislation than the Housing and Urban Development Act of 1968, which expanded housing funding programs.) While the Civil Rights Act of 1866 prohibited discrimination in housing, there were no federal enforcement provisions. The 1968 act expanded on previous acts and prohibited discrimination concerning the sale, rental, and financing of housing based on race, religion, national origin, and since 1974, sex. Since 1988, the act protects people with disabilities and families with children. Pregnant women are also protected from illegal discrimination because they have been given familial status with their unborn child being the other family member. Victims of discrimination may use both the 1968 act and the 1866 act's section 1983 to seek redress. The 1968 act provides for federal solutions while the 1866 act provides for private solutions (i.e., civil suits). The act also made it a federal crime to "by force or by threat of force, injure, intimidate, or interfere with anyone... by reason of their race, color, religion, or national origin, handicap or familial status."

Title X, commonly known as the Anti-Riot Act, makes it a felony to "travel in interstate commerce...with the intent to incite, promote, encourage, participate in and carry on a riot." That provision has been criticized for "equating organized political protest with organized violence."

=== Legislative history and components ===
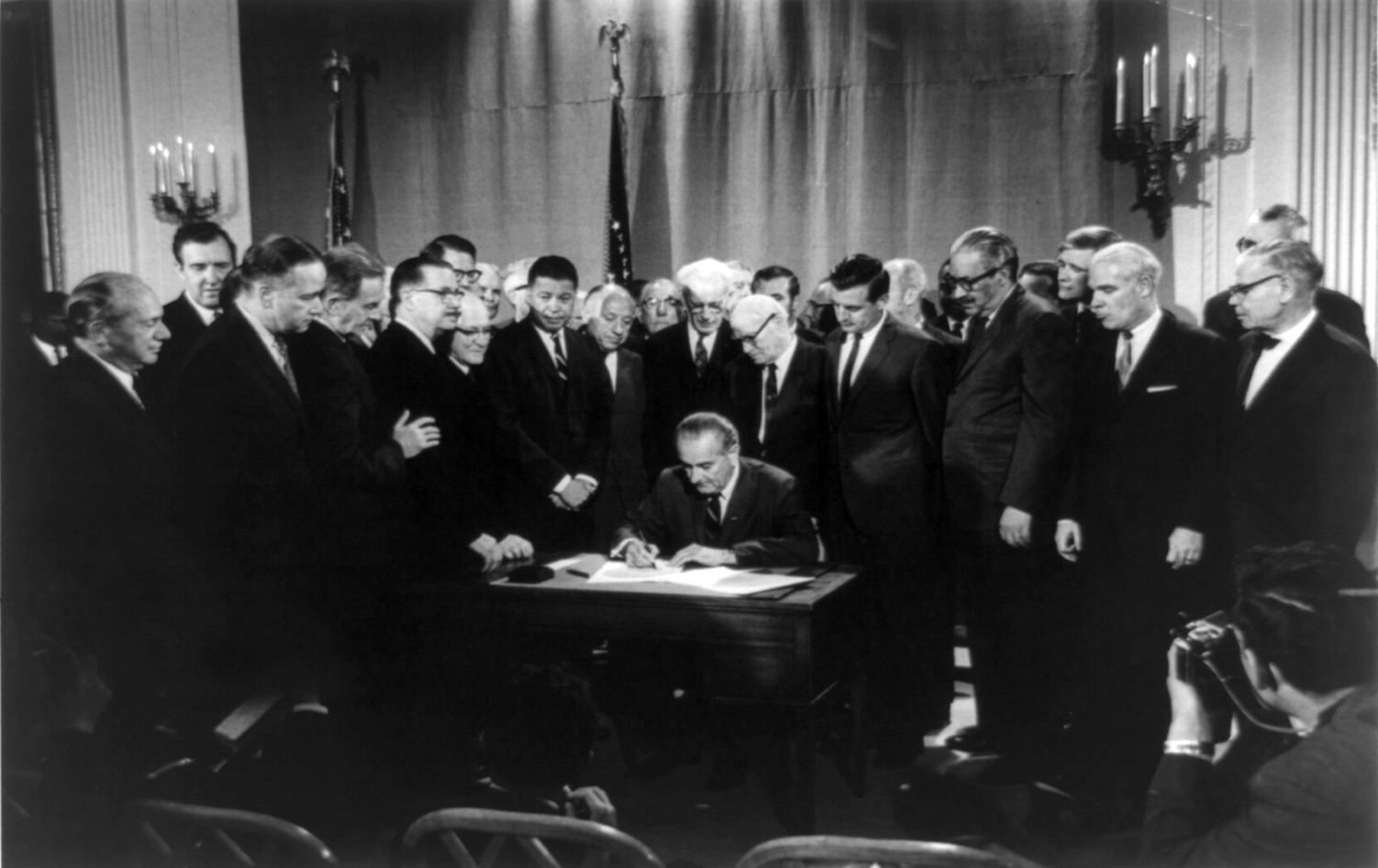
President Johnson signing the Civil Rights Act of 1968

In 1966, President Johnson proposed a new civil rights bill, but it was not passed through by the Senate. On February 17, 1967, the bill was introduced in the House by Rep. Manny Celler and in the Senate by Senator Philip A. Hart.

The House Judiciary Committee cleared HR 2516 (civil rights bill) and HR 10805 (extended life of Civil Rights Commission for another five years). House Judiciary Subcommittee No. 5 June 22 approved a package combining HR 2516 and HR 421 (Administration bill) in order to strengthen protections for civil rights workers.

The initial vote in the House of Representatives was 327–92 (161–25 in the House Republican Conference and 166–67 in the House Democratic Caucus) with 12 members voting present or abstaining, while in the Senate the final vote with amendments was 71–20 (29–3 in the Senate Republican Conference and 42–17 in the Senate Democratic Caucus) with 5 members voting present or abstaining. The House agreed to the Senate amendments by a vote of 250–172 (100–84 in the House Republican Conference and 150–88 in the House Democratic Caucus) with 10 members voting present or abstaining.

Bill H.R. 2516 was passed by the 90th United States Congress and signed by the 36th President of the United States, Lyndon B. Johnson on April 11, 1968.

==== Title I: Hate crimes ====
The Civil Rights Act of 1968 also enacted 18 U.S.C. § 249(b)(2), which permits federal prosecution of anyone who "willingly injures, intimidates or interferes with another person, or attempts to do so, by force because of the other person's race, color, religion or national origin" because of the victim's attempt to engage in one of six types of federally protected activities, such as attending school, patronizing a public place/facility, applying for employment, acting as a juror in a state court or voting.

Persons violating this law face a fine or imprisonment of up to one year or both. If bodily injury results or if such acts of intimidation involve the use of firearms, explosives or fire, individuals can receive prison terms of up to 10 years, while crimes involving kidnapping, sexual assault, or murder can be punishable by life in prison or the death penalty.

Though sexual orientation and gender identity were also excluded from this law, they are included in a more recent Federal hate-crime law, the Matthew Shepard and James Byrd, Jr. Hate Crimes Prevention Act.

==== Title II–VII: Indian Civil Rights Act ====
The Indian Civil Rights Act of 1968 granted Native Americans full access to the United States Bill of Rights. The first minor section focuses on re-establishing amendments now granted to Native Americans. The main portion of the section focuses on Native Americans in the United States legal system. The last section of this act points out other materials related to more constitutional rights of Native Americans, such as the "Indian Affairs, Laws and Treaties" doctrine.

==== Title VIII–IX: Fair Housing Act ====
===== Housing discrimination =====
Title VIII of the Civil Rights Act of 1968 is commonly referred to as the Fair Housing Act of 1968. Since 1968 its protections have been expanded significantly by amendment. The Office of Fair Housing and Equal Opportunity within the U.S. Department of Housing and Urban Development is charged with administering and enforcing this law.

===== Types of banned discrimination =====
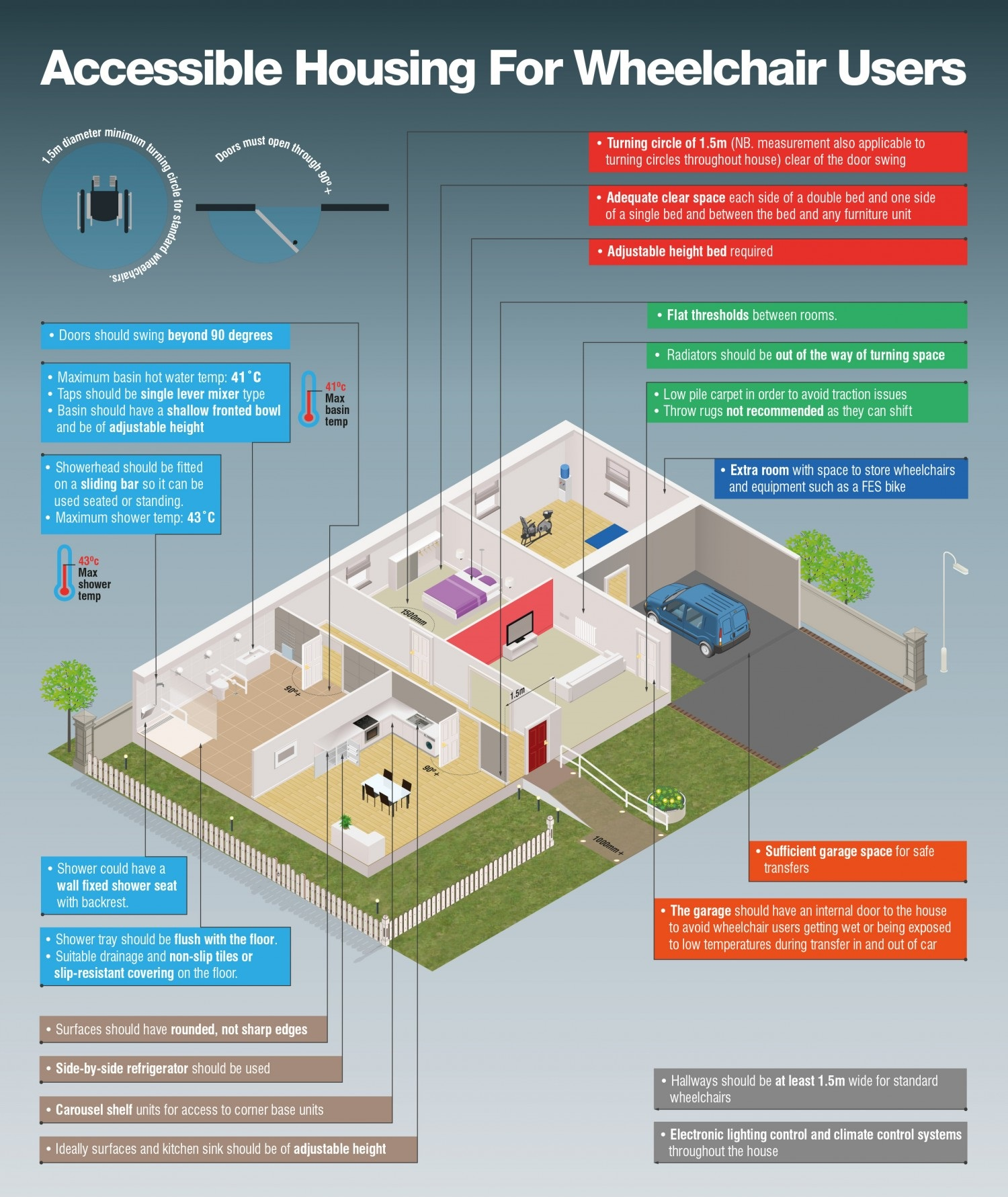
This shows what accessible housing looks like and some of the changes residents might make under the Fair Housing Act to make their living units accessible.

The Civil Rights Act of 1968 prohibited the following forms of housing discrimination:

- Refusal to sell or rent a dwelling to any person because of their race, color, religion or national origin. Discrimination on the basis of sex was added in 1974, and people with disabilities and families with children were added to the list of protected classes in 1988.
- Discrimination against a person in the terms, conditions or privilege of the sale or rental of a dwelling.
- Advertising the sale or rental of a dwelling indicating preference of discrimination based on race, color, religion or national origin. This provision was also amended to include sex, disability, and having children.
- Coercing, threatening, intimidating, or interfering with a person's enjoyment or exercise of housing rights based on discriminatory reasons or retaliating against a person or organization that aids or encourages the exercise or enjoyment of fair housing rights.
- Neglecting maintenance and repairs of the units rented by people based on race, religion, sex, or any other discriminatory demographic.
- Restricting access to services and amenities on the basis of the renter's race, gender, religion, or nationality.
- In 2012, the United States Department of Housing and Urban Development's Office of Fair Housing and Equal Opportunity issued a regulation prohibiting LGBT discrimination in federally assisted housing programs. The Supreme Court ruled in 2020 that discrimination on the basis of "sex" includes discrimination on the basis of sexual orientation and gender identity. It was not until February 2021 that Housing and Urban Development issued a rule change under President Joe Biden to implement this decision. In addition, many states, cities and towns have passed laws prohibiting discrimination in housing based on sexual orientation and gender identity.

===== Types of allowed discrimination =====
Only certain kinds of discrimination are covered by fair housing laws. Landlords are not required by law to rent to any tenant who applies for a property. Landlords can select tenants based on objective business criteria, such as the applicant's ability to pay the rent and take care of the property. Landlords can lawfully discriminate against tenants with bad credit histories or low incomes, and (except in some areas) do not have to rent to tenants who will be receiving Section 8 vouchers. Landlords must be consistent in the screening, treat tenants who are inside and outside the protected classes in the same manner, and should document any legitimate business reason for not renting to a prospective tenant.

The United States Department of Housing and Urban Development has stated that buyers and renters may discriminate and may request real estate agents representing them to limit home searches to parameters that are discriminatory. The primary purpose of the Fair Housing Act is to protect the buyer's (and renter's) right to seek a dwelling anywhere they choose. It protects the buyer's right to discriminate by prohibiting certain discriminatory acts by sellers, landlords, and real estate agents.

===== People with disabilities =====
The Fair Housing Act defines a person with a disability in the same manner as the Americans with Disabilities Act – "a person with a physical or mental impairment which substantially limits one or more major life activities; a record of such an impairment; or being regarded as having such an impairment."

The Fair Housing Act provides several specific protections for buyers and tenants with disabilities. Landlords and sellers cannot make a dwelling unit unavailable or deny a dwelling to a buyer or renter because of their disability or the disability of any person who intends to reside in the dwelling or because of the disability of anyone with whom they are associated. Landlords cannot deny a person with a disability all of the privileges provided in connection with the dwelling, because of the person's disability.

The Fair Housing Act (FHA) provides some specific protections for people with disabilities that facilitate independence and community living. First, the FHA allows tenants to make reasonable modifications to the existing premises. It makes it illegal for landlords to not allow people with disabilities to make reasonable modifications to the premises, at their own expense, if they need the modification to have full enjoyment of the premises. For example, an individual with a disability may require grab bars installed in order to have access to take a shower. The landlord must allow the tenant to install the grab bars to allow access to take a shower. However, technically, the landlord may require the tenant remove the grab bars at the end of the tenancy, at the tenant's own expense. However, the regulations specify that in rental housing, a landlord may not condition widening a bathroom doorway to provide wheelchair access, to its return to its former narrow state upon the end of the tenancy, since it will not interfere with the next tenants use and enjoyment of the premises.

The second protection offered by the FHA includes the requirement that no one can refuse to make reasonable accommodations to "rules, policies, practices, or services, when the accommodation is necessary to afford" a person with a disability "equal opportunity to use and enjoy a dwelling unit," including the amenities of the dwelling, which may involve common areas. For example, a building with a "No Pets" policy would violate the FHA if it did not allow a blind person to have their seeing eye dog live with them as a reasonable accommodation to the policy. Similarly, a wheelchair user could request an assigned, accessible parking space as a reasonable accommodation in a "first come first serve" parking lot attached to an apartment complex.

==== Title X: Anti-Riot Act ====
The Act included the "Anti-Riot Act," enacted at 18 U.S.C. § 2101 (with its key terms, "riot" and "incite a riot," defined in 18 U.S.C. § 2102), which makes it a federal crime to use interstate or foreign commerce routes or facilities (such as by crossing state lines or through mail, use of the Internet, or phone calls) to incite a riot, organize, promote or participate in a riot or to extend activities of a riot, or to aid and abet any person performing such activities. The provision has been informally referred to as the "H. Rap Brown Law" since the arrest and trial of H. Rap Brown in 1967 for carrying a gun across state lines. Rulings by the 4th Circuit in 2020 and 9th Circuit in 2021 struck down in those circuits the portions of the law which prohibit "urging" a riot on the grounds of freedom of speech, leaving in place bans on inciting and participation in riots.

== Civil Rights Restoration Act of 1987 ==
The Civil Rights Restoration Act of 1987, or'Grove City Bill, is a United States legislative act that specifies that entities receiving federal funds must comply with civil rights legislation in all of their operations, not just in the program or activity that received the funding. The Act overturned the precedent set by the Supreme Court decision in Grove City College v. Bell, 465 U.S. 555 (1984), which held that only the particular program in an educational institution receiving federal financial assistance was required to comply with the anti-discrimination provisions of Title IX of the Education Amendments of 1972, not the institution as a whole.

=== Legislative history ===
The Act was first passed by the House in June 1984 (375–32) but stalled for several years after divisions over its potential effects on Title IX regulations prohibiting discrimination relating to abortion impeded the effectiveness of a civil rights coalition. In January 1988, the Senate accepted an amendment by Senator John Danforth (R-MO). He is described as "abortion neutral" and clarified that the Act does not impose a requirement for entities receiving federal funding to pay or provide for abortions and that it prohibits discrimination against women who use or seek abortion services. The amendment was opposed by the National Organization for Women and other pro-choice groups but ultimately resulted in passage of the bill in both the House and the Senate.

The final vote in the Senate, on January 28, 1988, was 75–14 (48–0 in the Senate Democratic Caucus and 27–14 in the Senate Republican Conference), with 11 members voting present or abstaining. The final vote in the House of Representatives on March 2, 1988, was 315–98 (242–4 in the House Democratic Caucus and 73–94 in the House Republican Conference) with 20 members voting present or abstaining.

On March 16, 1988, President Ronald Reagan vetoed the bill by arguing that the Act represented an overexpansion of governmental power over private organizational decision-making and "would diminish substantially the freedom and independence of religious institutions in our society." On March 22, 1988, the Senate overrode Reagan's veto by a vote of 73–24 (52–0 in the Senate Democratic Caucus and 21–24 in the Senate Republican Conference) with 3 members voting present or abstaining. On the same day, the House voted in favor of the bill with a vote of 292–133 (240–10 in the House Democratic Caucus and 52–123 in the House Republican Conference), with 7 members voting present or abstaining. Reagan's veto was the first veto of a civil rights act since Andrew Johnson vetoed the Civil Rights Act of 1866.

=== Provisions ===
In addition to Title IX of the Education Amendments of 1972 (which prohibits sex discrimination in educational institutions), the Act applies to the Rehabilitation Act of 1973 (which prohibits discrimination on the basis of disability), Title VI of the Civil Rights Act of 1964 (which prohibits racial discrimination), and the Age Discrimination in Employment Act of 1967 (which prohibits age discrimination in employment).

With the passage of the act, educational institutions receiving any federal funding were required to comply with all federal civil rights laws, including those relating to gender, race, and disability, throughout the institution (not only in the parts of the institution receiving the funding). The act also extended protection against discrimination in educational institutions to a wider range of individuals, including students, faculty, and staff.

== Civil Rights Act of 1990 ==
The Civil Rights Act of 1990' was a bill that, had it been signed into law, would have made it easier for litigants in race or sex discrimination cases to win. It was introduced into the 101st United States Congress on February 7, 1990, by Senator Edward Kennedy (D-MA) in the United States Senate, and by Augustus Hawkins (D-CA) in the House of Representatives. While making its way through Congress, the bill was considered to be civil rights groups' number one legislative priority. Soon before the bill made it to the desk of then-President of the United States George H. W. Bush, it was criticized by the Harvard Law School professor Charles Fried. In a New York Times op-ed, Fried (a ranking member of the Federalist Society who served as Solicitor General in the Reagan Administration from 1985-1989), wrote that descriptions of the bill as the most important civil rights legislation in a quarter-century were "a public relations flimflam perpetrated by a cabal of overzealous civil rights plaintiffs' lawyers." He concluded by saying that Bush should "veto this bill in its present form."

On October 22, 1990, President Bush vetoed the bill, claiming that it "employs a maze of highly legalistic language to introduce the destructive force of quotas into our national employment system." The Bush administration argued that the bill's provisions were strict enough that they would give employers "powerful incentives" to adopt quotas. Supporters of the bill argued that, contrary to Bush's claims, the bill would not have led employers to adopt quotas. For example, Benjamin Hooks, the then-executive director of the NAACP, said he was "at a loss" as to why Bush described the legislation as a quota bill. Congress attempted to override his veto on October 24, but their attempt failed in the Senate by one vote to achieve the two-thirds majority required.

The Civil Rights Act of 1991 is a United States labor law, passed in response to United States Supreme Court decisions that limited the rights of employees who had sued their employers for discrimination. The Act represented the first effort since the passage of the Civil Rights Act of 1964 to modify some of the basic procedural and substantive rights provided by federal law in employment discrimination cases. It provided the right to trial by jury on discrimination claims and introduced the possibility of emotional distress damages and limited the amount that a jury could award. It added provisions to Title VII of the Civil Rights Act of 1964 protections expanding the rights of women to sue and collect compensatory and punitive damages for sexual discrimination or harassment. U.S. President George H. W. Bush had used his veto against the more comprehensive Civil Rights Act of 1990. He feared racial quotas would be imposed but later approved the 1991 version of the bill.

The 1991 Act was intended to strengthen the protections afforded by 2 different civil rights acts: the Civil Rights Act of 1866, better known by the number assigned to it in the codification of federal laws as Section 1981, and the employment-related provisions of the Civil Rights Act of 1964, generally referred to as Title VII. The two statutes, passed nearly a century apart, approached the issue of employment discrimination very differently: Section 1981 prohibited only discrimination based on race or color, but Title VII also prohibited discrimination on the basis of sex, religion, and national origin. Section 1981, which had lain dormant and unenforced for a century after its passage, allowed plaintiffs to seek compensatory damages and trial by jury. Title VII, passed in the 1960s when it was assumed that Southern juries could not render a fair verdict, allowed only trial by the court and provided for only traditional equitable remedies: back pay, reinstatement, and injunctions against future acts of discrimination. By the time the 1991 Act was passed, both allowed for an award of attorneys' fees. The 1991 Act expanded the remedies available to victims of discrimination by amending Title VII of the 1964 Act.

=== Background ===
Congress had amended Title VII once before, in 1972, when it broadened the coverage of the Act. It was moved to overhaul Title VII in 1991 and to harmonize it with Section 1981 jurisprudence, as a result of a series of controversial Supreme Court decisions:

- Patterson v. McLean Credit Union, 491 U.S. 164 (1989), which held that an employee could not sue for damages caused by racial harassment on the job because even if the employer's conduct were discriminatory, the employer had not denied the employee the "same right... to make and enforce contracts... as is enjoyed by white citizens," the language that Congress chose in passing the law in 1866.
- Wards Cove Packing Co. v. Atonio, 490 U.S. 642 (1989), which made it more difficult for employees of Wards Cove Packing Company to prove that an employer's personnel practices, neutral on their face, had an unlawful disparate impact on them by requiring that they identify the particular policy or requirement that allegedly produced inequalities in the workplace and show that it, in isolation, had that effect.
- Price Waterhouse v. Hopkins, 490 U.S. 228 (1989), which held that the burden of proof shifted, once an employee had proved that an unlawful consideration had played a part in the employer's personnel decision, to the employer to prove that it would have made the same decision if it had not been motivated by that unlawful factor, but such proof by the employer would constitute a complete defense for the employer.
- Martin v. Wilks, 490 U.S. 755 (1989), which permitted white firefighters who had not been party to the litigation, establishing a consent decree governing hiring and promotion of black firefighters in the Birmingham, Alabama, Fire Department, to bring suit to challenge the decree.
- United Automobile Workers v. Johnson Controls, Inc., 499 U.S. 187 (1991), which held that Title VII prohibits gender-specific fetal protection policies.

=== Changes ===
Patterson had attracted much criticism since it appeared to leave employees victimized by racial harassment on the job with no effective remedies, as they could not prove a violation of Section 1981 and could rarely show any wage losses that they could recover under Title VII. In addition, the Court's narrow reading of the phrase "make or enforce contracts" eliminated any liability under Section 1981 for lost promotions and most other personnel decisions that did not constitute a refusal to hire on the basis of race or color.

Congress addressed the issue by redefining the phrase "make and enforce contracts" to include "the making, performance, modification, and termination of contracts, and the enjoyment of all benefits, privileges, terms, and conditions of the contractual relationship." Congress also clarified that Section 1981 applied to both governmental and private discrimination, the issue that the Supreme Court originally announced it would decide in Patterson.

Congress also believed that the Wards Cove case made it too difficult to prove disparate impact claims under Title VII. While the amended Act still generally requires that a plaintiff identify particular employment practice(s) allegedly causing a disparate impact, Congress added that an employer's decisionmaking process may be analyzed as a whole if the plaintiff can show that "the elements of [an employer's] decisionmaking process are not capable of separation for analysis." Congress also established that the employer has the burden of proof on the business necessity defense and restored the meaning of "business necessity" to how it was interpreted before Wards Cove. Congress did not, however, alter the portion of Wards Cove describing the plaintiff's burden with respect to statistical proof, in which the court had held: "The mere existence of a statistical imbalance in an employer's workforce on account of race, color, religion, sex, or national origin is not alone sufficient to establish a prima facie case of disparate impact violation."

While the majority in Congress supported the burden-shifting rule in Price Waterhouse, it was uncomfortable with how that case gave the employer the ability to prove that it would have made the same decision in any event, as a complete defense in a case in which it had been shown that race or gender or another unlawful factor played a significant role in its decision. Congress amended the Act to provide that the employer's proof that it would have made the same decision in any case was a defense to back pay, reinstatement and other remedies but not to liability per se. The practical effect of this change was to allow a party that proved that the employer discriminated but could not show that it made any practical difference to the outcome could still recover attorney's fees after showing that the employer discriminated, even if no other remedy was awarded.

Finally, Congress limited the rights of non-parties to attack consent decrees by barring any challenges by parties who knew or should have known of the decree or who were adequately represented by the original parties. The Act also authorized jury trials on Title VII claims and allowed Title VII plaintiffs to recover emotional distress and punitive damages, while imposing caps on such relief. The 1991 Act also made technical changes affecting the length of time allowed to challenge unlawful seniority provisions, to sue the federal government for discrimination, and to bring age discrimination claims, but it allowed successful plaintiffs to recover expert witness fees as part of an award of attorney's fees and to collect interest on any judgment against the federal government.

== See also ==
- Civil right acts in the United States

== Bibliography ==
- Goldstone, Lawrence (2011). Inherently Unequal: The Betrayal of Equal Rights by the Supreme Court, 1865–1903. Walker & Company. ISBN 978-0802717924.
- Pach, Chester J.; Richardson, Elmo (1991). Presidency of Dwight D. Eisenhower. University Press of Kansas. ISBN 0700604367.
