= Civil Rights Act of 1964 =

Landmark U.S. civil rights and labor law

- Long title: An Act to enforce the constitutional right to vote, to confer jurisdiction upon the district courts of the United States of America to provide injunctive relief against discrimination in public accommodations, to authorize the Attorney General to institute suits to protect constitutional rights in public facilities and public education, to extend the Commission on Civil Rights, to prevent discrimination in federally assisted programs, to establish a Commission on Equal Employment Opportunity, and for other purposes.
- Enacted by: the 88th United States Congress
- Effective: July 2, 1964

Citations
- Public law: 88-352
- Statutes at Large: 78 Stat. 241

Codification
- Acts amended: Civil Rights Act of 1957; Civil Rights Act of 1960
- Titles amended: Title 42: Public Health and Welfare

Legislative history
- Introduced in the House as H.R. 7152 by Emanuel Celler (D–NY) on June 20, 1963; Committee consideration by House Judiciary Committee; Passed the House on February 10, 1964 (290–130); Passed the Senate on June 19, 1964 (73–27) with amendment; House agreed to Senate amendment on July 2, 1964 (289–126); Signed into law by President Lyndon B. Johnson on July 2, 1964

Major amendments
- Equal Employment Opportunity Act of 1972; Pregnancy Discrimination Act; Civil Rights Restoration Act of 1987; Civil Rights Act of 1991; No Child Left Behind Act; Lilly Ledbetter Fair Pay Act of 2009

United States Supreme Court cases
- See § United States Supreme Court cases

The Civil Rights Act of 1964 (Pub. L. 88–352, 78 Stat. 241, enacted July 2, 1964) is a landmark civil rights and labor law in the United States that outlaws discrimination based on race, color, religion, sex, (Note: Three Supreme Court rulings in June 2020 interpreted that employment discrimination on the basis of sexual orientation or gender identity is a form of discrimination on the basis of sex and is therefore also outlawed by the Civil Rights Act. See Bostock v. Clayton County, and also see below for more details.) and national origin. It prohibits unequal application of voter registration requirements, racial segregation in schools and public accommodations, and employment discrimination. The act is considered one of the most significant legislative achievements in American history.

Initially, powers given to enforce the act were weak, but these were supplemented during later years. Congress asserted its authority to legislate under several different parts of the United States Constitution, principally its enumerated power to regulate interstate commerce under the Commerce Clause of Article I, Section 8, its duty to guarantee all citizens equal protection of the laws under the 14th Amendment, and its duty to protect voting rights under the 15th Amendment.

The legislation was proposed by President John F. Kennedy in June 1963, but it was opposed by filibuster in the Senate. After Kennedy was assassinated on November 22, 1963, President Lyndon B. Johnson pushed the bill forward. The United States House of Representatives passed the bill on February 10, 1964, and after a 72-day filibuster, it passed the United States Senate on June 19, 1964. The final vote was 290–130 in the House of Representatives and 73–27 in the Senate. After the House agreed to a subsequent Senate amendment, the Civil Rights Act of 1964 was signed into law by President Johnson at the White House on July 2, 1964.

== Background ==
=== Reconstruction and New Deal era ===
In the 1883 landmark Civil Rights Cases, the United States Supreme Court had ruled that Congress did not have the power to prohibit discrimination in the private sector, thus stripping the Civil Rights Act of 1875 of much of its ability to protect civil rights.

In the late 19th and early 20th century, the legal justification for voiding the Civil Rights Act of 1875 was part of a larger trend by the United States Supreme Court majorities to invalidate most government regulations of the private sector, except when dealing with laws designed to protect traditional public morality.

In the 1930s, during the New Deal, the majority of the Supreme Court justices gradually shifted their legal theory to allow for greater government regulation of the private sector under the Commerce Clause, thus paving the way for the federal government to enact civil rights laws prohibiting both public and private sector discrimination on the basis of the commerce clause.

Influenced in part by the "Black Cabinet" advisors and the March on Washington Movement, just before the U.S. entered World War II, President Franklin Roosevelt issued Executive Order 8802, the first federal anti-discrimination order, and established the Fair Employment Practices Committee. Roosevelt's successor, President Harry Truman, appointed the President's Committee on Civil Rights, proposed the 20th century's first comprehensive Civil Rights Act, and issued Executive Order 9980 and Executive Order 9981, providing for fair employment and desegregation throughout the federal government and the armed forces.

=== Civil Rights Act of 1957 ===
The Civil Rights Act of 1957, signed by President Dwight D. Eisenhower on September 9, 1957, was the first federal civil rights legislation since the Civil Rights Act of 1875 to become law. After the Supreme Court ruled school segregation unconstitutional in 1954 in Brown v. Board of Education, Southern Democrats began a campaign of "massive resistance" against desegregation, and even the few moderate white leaders shifted to openly racist positions. Partly in an effort to defuse calls for more far-reaching reforms, Eisenhower proposed a civil rights bill to increase the protection of voting rights for African Americans.

Despite having a limited impact on African-American voter participation, at a time when black voter registration ranged from 0% (in 11 counties) to less than 5% (in 97 counties) despite being majority-Black counties, the Civil Rights Act of 1957 did establish the United States Commission on Civil Rights and the United States Department of Justice Civil Rights Division. By 1960, black voting had increased by only 3%, and Congress passed the Civil Rights Act of 1960, which eliminated certain loopholes left by the 1957 Act.

=== Activism ===
Global media additionally played a major influential role across both the Kennedy and Johnson administrations, in allowing for the eventual passage of the 1964 Civil Rights Act. As the negative global attention that televised instances of Civil rights resistance received such as the 1957 Little Rock Crisis, challenging the 1954 Brown vs Board of Education ruling by the United States Supreme Court which outlawed public school segregation, and the attack on the 1963 Birmingham campaign protestors, put major pressure on the executive branch of government to enact sweeping legislative reform.

=== 1963 Kennedy civil rights bill ===
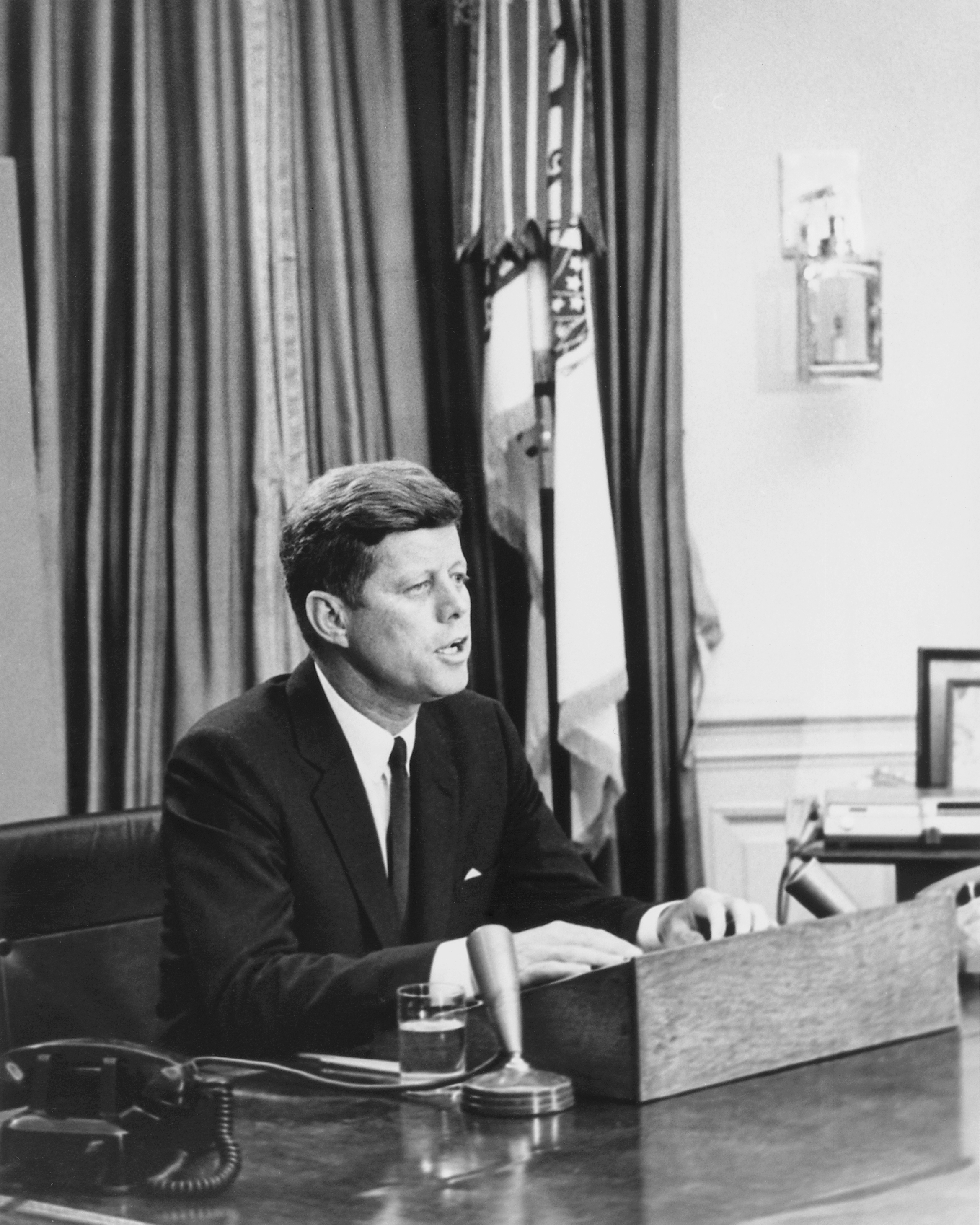
U.S. president John F. Kennedy addresses the nation on civil rights in a speech on June 11, 1963.

In winning the 1960 United States presidential election, Kennedy took 70% of the African American vote. But due to his narrow victory and Democrats' narrow majorities in Congress, he was wary to push hard for civil rights legislation for fear of losing southern support. Moreover, according to the Miller Center, he wanted to wait until his second term to send Congress a civil rights bill. But with elevated racial tensions and a wave of African-American protests in the spring of 1963, such as the Birmingham campaign, Kennedy realized he had to act on civil rights.

Kennedy first proposed the 1964 bill in his Report to the American People on Civil Rights on June 11, 1963. He sought legislation "giving all Americans the right to be served in facilities which are open to the public – hotels, restaurants, theaters, retail stores, and similar establishments" – as well as "greater protection for the right to vote". In late July, Walter Reuther, president of the United Auto Workers, warned that if Congress failed to pass Kennedy's civil rights bill, the country would face another civil war.

Emulating the Civil Rights Act of 1875, which had been struck down by the Supreme Court in 1883, Kennedy's civil rights bill included provisions to ban discrimination in public accommodations and enable the U.S. attorney general to join lawsuits against state governments that operated segregated school systems, among other provisions. But it did not include a number of provisions civil rights leaders deemed essential, including protection against police brutality, ending discrimination in private employment, and granting the Justice Department power to initiate desegregation or job discrimination lawsuits.

== Legislative history ==
=== House of Representatives ===
On June 11, 1963, President Kennedy met with Republican leaders to discuss the legislation before his television address to the nation that evening. Two days later, Senate minority leader Everett Dirksen and Senate majority leader Mike Mansfield both voiced support for the president's bill, except for provisions guaranteeing equal access to places of public accommodations. This led to several Republican representatives drafting a compromise bill to be considered. On June 19, the president sent his bill to Congress as it was originally written, saying legislative action was "imperative". The president's bill went first to the House of Representatives, where it was referred to the Judiciary Committee, chaired by New York Democrat Emanuel Celler. After a series of hearings on the bill, Celler's committee strengthened the act, adding provisions to ban racial discrimination in employment, providing greater protection to black voters, eliminating segregation in all publicly owned facilities (not just schools), and strengthening the anti-segregation clauses regarding public facilities such as lunch counters. They also added authorization for the attorney general to file lawsuits to protect individuals against the deprivation of any rights secured by the Constitution or U.S. law. In essence, this was the controversial "Title III" that had been removed from the 1957 act and 1960 act. Civil rights organizations pressed hard for this provision because it could be used to protect peaceful protesters and black voters from police brutality and suppression of free speech rights.

=== Lobbying efforts ===
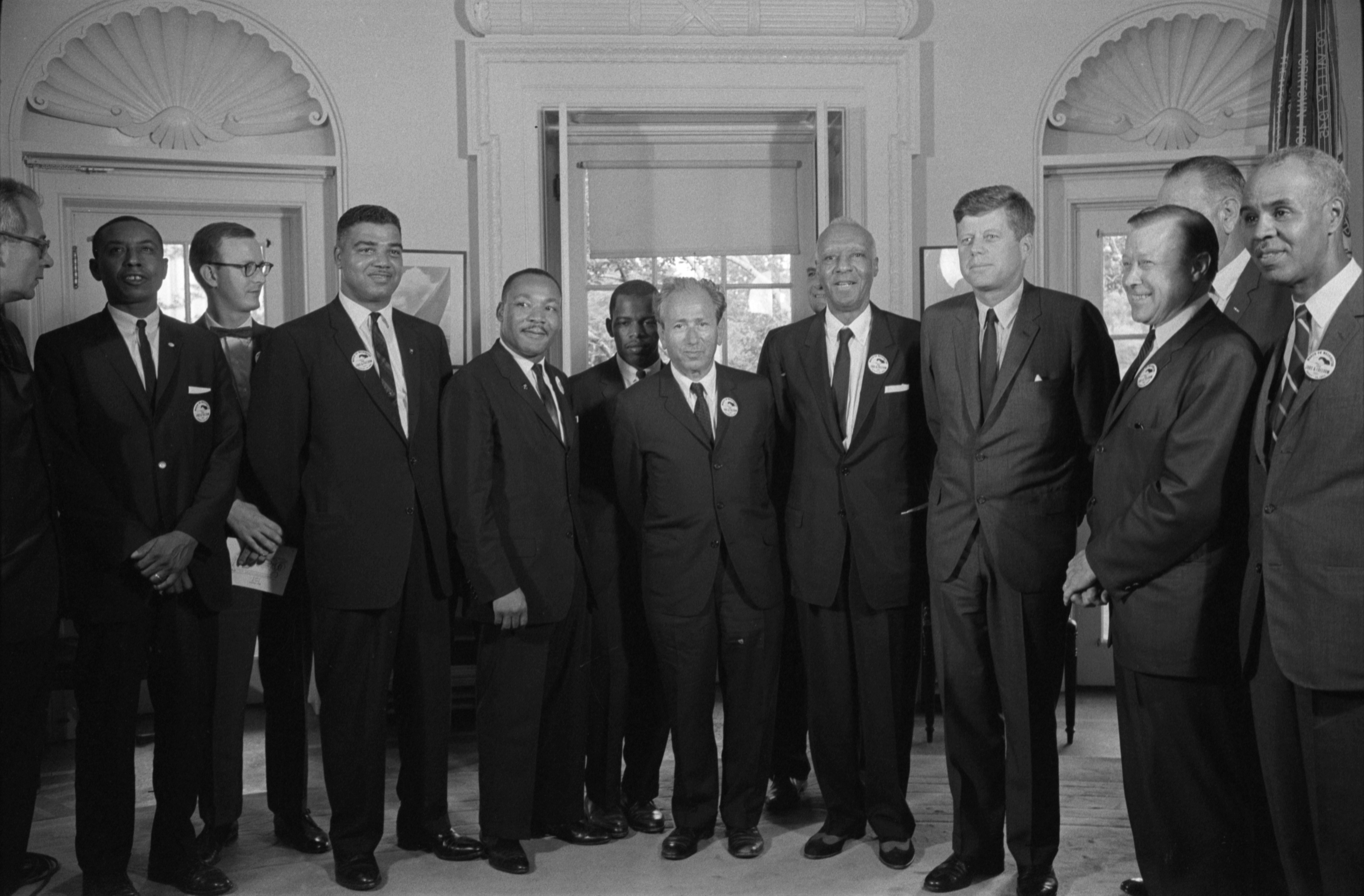
Following the March on Washington on August 28, 1963, civil rights leaders met with President Kennedy and Vice President Johnson to discuss civil rights legislation.

Lobbying support for the Civil Rights Act was coordinated by the Leadership Conference on Civil Rights, a coalition of 70 liberal and labor organizations. The principal lobbyists for the Leadership Conference were civil rights lawyer Joseph L. Rauh Jr. and Clarence Mitchell Jr. of the NAACP.

After the March on Washington for Jobs and Freedom, on August 28, 1963, the organizers visited Kennedy to discuss the civil rights bill. Roy Wilkins, A. Philip Randolph, and Walter Reuther attempted to persuade him to support a provision establishing a Fair Employment Practices Commission that would ban discriminatory practices by all federal agencies, unions, and private companies.

Kennedy called the congressional leaders to the White House in late October 1963 to line up the necessary votes in the House for passage. The bill was reported out of the Judiciary Committee in November 1963 and referred to the Rules Committee, whose chairman, Howard W. Smith, a Democrat and staunch segregationist from Virginia, indicated his intention to keep the bill bottled up indefinitely.

=== Johnson's appeal to Congress ===
The assassination of U.S. president John F. Kennedy on November 22, 1963, changed the political situation. Kennedy's successor as president, Lyndon B. Johnson, made use of his experience in legislative politics, along with the bully pulpit he wielded as president, in support of the bill. In his first address to a joint session of Congress on November 27, 1963, Johnson told the legislators, "No memorial oration or eulogy could more eloquently honor President Kennedy's memory than the earliest possible passage of the civil rights bill for which he fought so long."

Judiciary Committee Chairman Emanuel Celler filed a petition to discharge the bill from the Rules Committee; it required the support of a majority of House members to move the bill to the floor. Initially, Celler had a difficult time acquiring the signatures necessary, with many Representatives who supported the civil rights bill itself remaining cautious about violating normal House procedure with the rare use of a discharge petition. By the time of the 1963 winter recess, 50 signatures were still needed.

After the return of Congress from its winter recess, however, it was apparent that public opinion in the North favored the bill and that the petition would acquire the necessary signatures. To avert the humiliation of a successful discharge petition, Chairman Smith relented and allowed the bill to pass through the Rules Committee.

=== Passage in the Senate ===
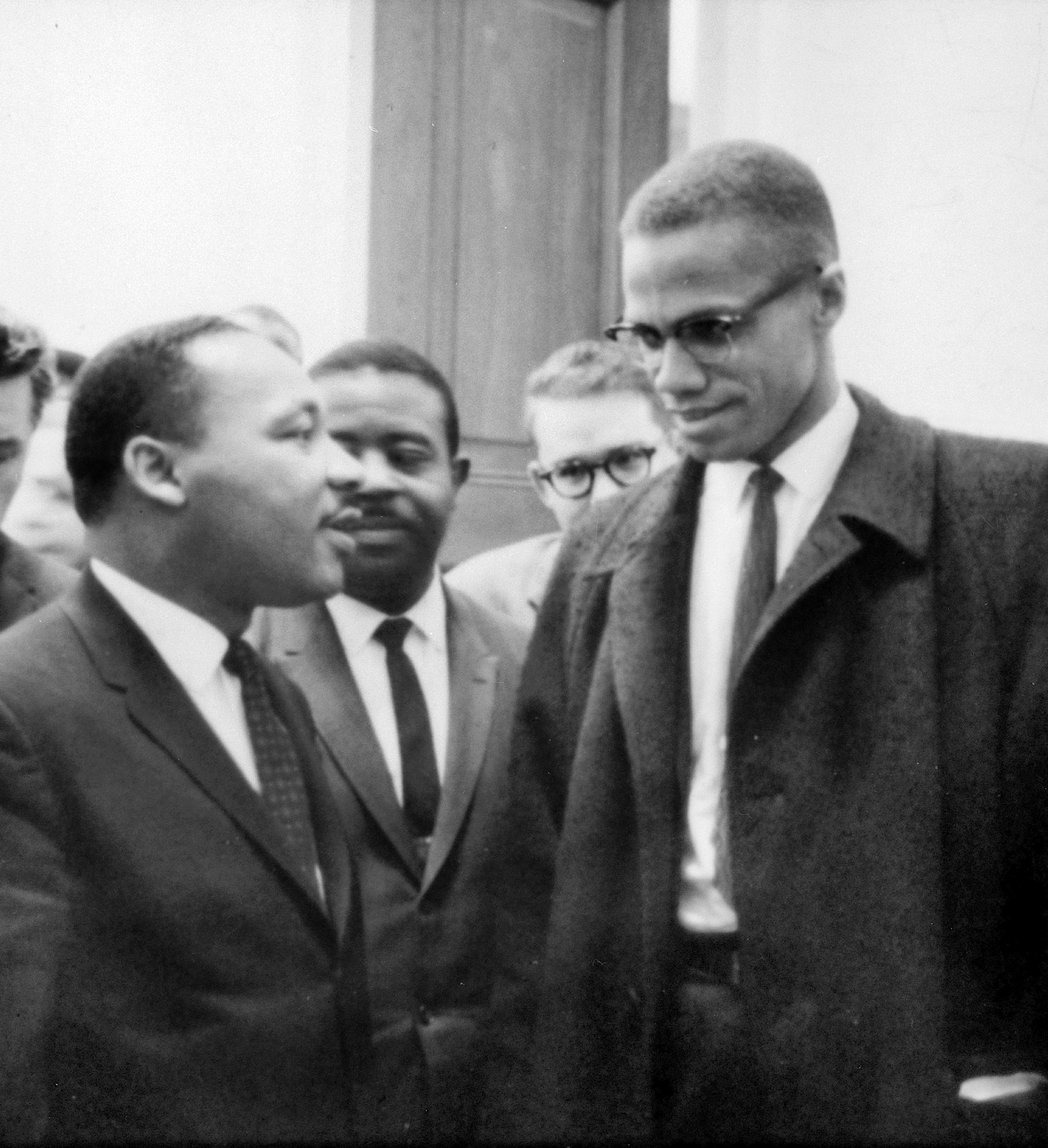
Activists Martin Luther King Jr. and Malcolm X at the United States Capitol on March 26, 1964, listening to the Senate debate on the bill. The two met for only one minute.

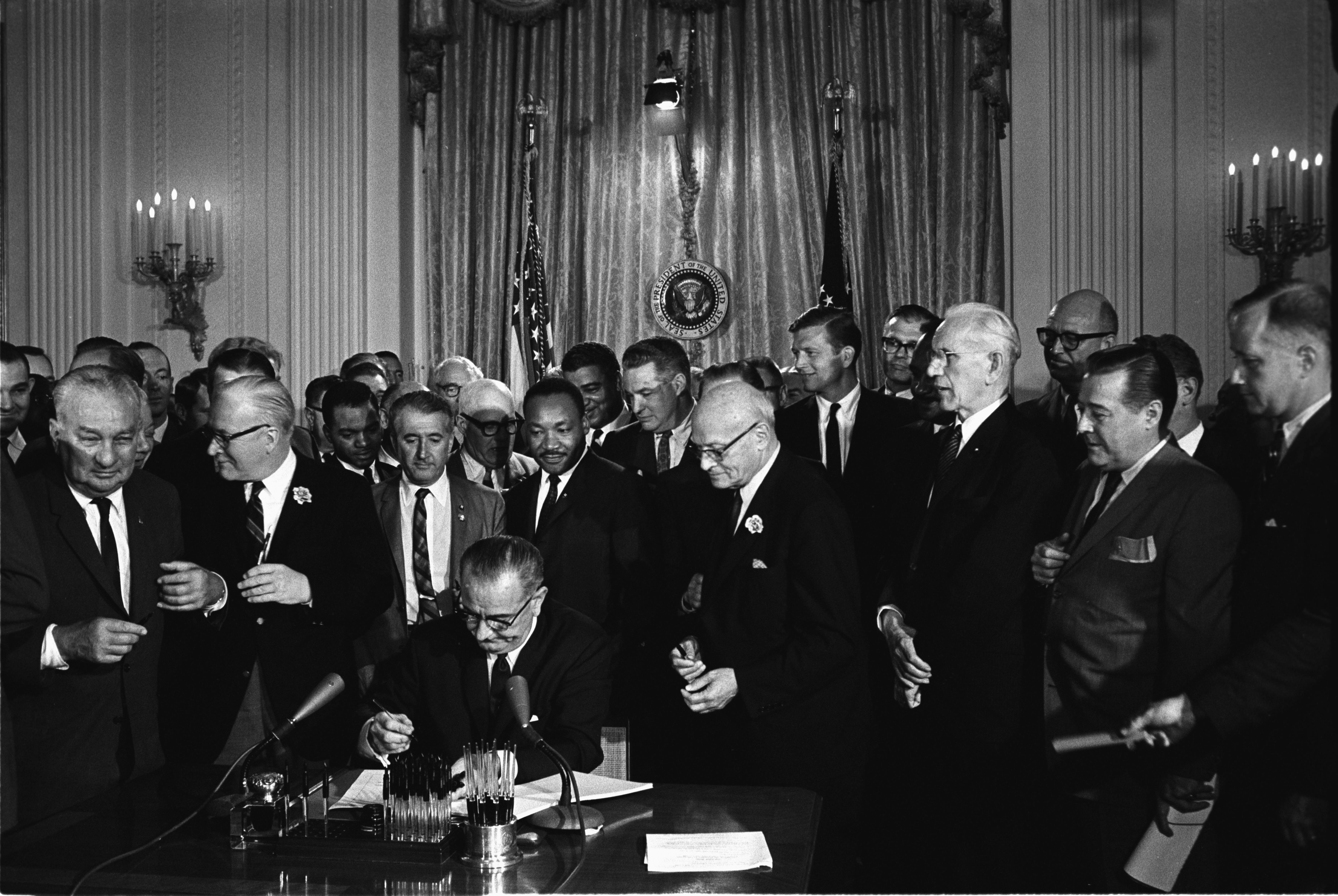
U.S. president Lyndon B. Johnson signs the Civil Rights Act of 1964. Among the guests behind him is Martin Luther King Jr.

Johnson, who wanted the bill passed as soon as possible, ensured that it would be quickly considered by the Senate.

Normally, the bill would have been referred to the Senate Judiciary Committee, which was chaired by James O. Eastland, a Democrat from Mississippi, whose firm opposition made it seem impossible that the bill would reach the Senate floor. Senate majority leader Mike Mansfield took a novel approach to prevent the Judiciary Committee from keeping the bill in limbo: initially waiving a second reading immediately after the first reading, which would have sent it to the Judiciary Committee, he took the unprecedented step of giving the bill a second reading on February 26, 1964, thereby bypassing the Judiciary Committee, and sending it to the Senate floor for immediate debate.

When the bill came before the full Senate for debate on March 30, 1964, the "Southern Bloc" of 18 southern Democratic senators and lone Republican John Tower of Texas, led by Richard Russell (D-GA), launched a filibuster to prevent its passage. Russell proclaimed, "We will resist to the bitter end any measure or any movement which would tend to bring about social equality and intermingling and amalgamation of the races in our [Southern] states."

Strong opposition to the bill also came from Senator Strom Thurmond, who was still a Democrat at the time: "This so-called Civil Rights Proposals [sic], which the President has sent to Capitol Hill for enactment into law, are unconstitutional, unnecessary, unwise and extend beyond the realm of reason. This is the worst civil-rights package ever presented to the Congress and is reminiscent of the Reconstruction proposals and actions of the radical Republican Congress."

The breakdown by party of the first floor vote in the US House of the Civil Rights Act of 1964. February 10, 1964. Light colors represents members who voted nay, dark represents members who voted aye, grey represents members who voted present or did not vote.

After the filibuster had gone on for 54 days, senators Mansfield, Hubert Humphrey, Everett Dirksen, and Thomas Kuchel introduced a substitute bill that they hoped would overcome it by combining a sufficient number of Republicans as well as core liberal Democrats. The compromise bill was weaker than the House version as to the government's power in regulating the conduct of private business, but not weak enough to make the House reconsider it.

The breakdown by party of the floor vote in the Senate of the Civil Rights Act of 1964. June 19, 1964. Light colors means a nay vote, dark means aye.

Senator Robert Byrd ended his filibuster in opposition to the bill on the morning of June 10, 1964, after 14 hours and 13 minutes. Up to then, the measure had occupied the Senate for 60 working days, including six Saturdays. The day before, Humphrey, the bill's manager, concluded that he had the 67 votes required at that time to end the debate and the filibuster. With six wavering senators providing a four-vote victory margin, the final tally stood at 71 to 29. Never before in its entire history had the Senate been able to muster enough votes to defeat a filibuster on a civil rights bill, and only once in the 37 years since 1927 had it agreed to cloture for any measure.

The most dramatic moment during the cloture vote came when Senator Clair Engle (D-CA) was wheeled into the chamber. Suffering from terminal brain cancer, unable to speak, he pointed to his left eye, signifying his affirmative "Aye" vote when his name was called. He died seven weeks later.

=== Legislative breakdown ===
The breakdown by party of the second floor vote in the House of Representatives of the legislation. July 2, 1964. Light colors represents members who voted nay, dark represents members who voted aye, and grey represents members who voted present or did not vote.

H.R. 7152 was brought to a floor vote in the chambers of the House of Representatives on February 10, 1964. The Republican Party voted 138 in favor, 34 against. The Democratic Party voted 152 in favor, 96 against. 5 members voted present, and 6 members did not vote.

It was then brought to the floor of the Senate on June 19, 1964, for a vote. The Republican Party voted 27 in favor, 6 against. The Democratic Party voted 46 in favor, 21 against.

With amendments having been made to the bill, it was sent back to the House for final passage. The House took H.R. 7152 on the floor for vote on July 2, 1964. Republicans voted 136 in favor, 35 against, 2 present, 5 not voting. Democrats voted 153 in favor, 91 against, 2 present, 12 not voting.

Upon being passed by the House, it was signed by President Lyndon B. Johnson on the same day.

=== Vote totals ===
Democratic
Republican

Result: Passed
Roll call vote

Senator	Party	State	Vote
George Aiken	R	Vermont	Yea
Gordon Allott	R	Colorado	Yea
Clinton Anderson	D	New Mexico	Yea
Bob Bartlett	D	Alaska	Yea
Birch Bayh	D	Indiana	Yea
J. Glenn Beall	R	Maryland	Yea
Wallace F. Bennett	R	Utah	Yea
Alan Bible	D	Nevada	Yea
J. Caleb Boggs	R	Delaware	Yea
Daniel Brewster	D	Maryland	Yea
Quentin Burdick	D	North Dakota	Yea
Harry F. Byrd	D	Virginia	Nay
Robert Byrd	D	West Virginia	Nay
Howard Cannon	D	Nevada	Yea
Frank Carlson	R	Kansas	Yea
Clifford P. Case	R	New Jersey	Yea
Frank Church	D	Idaho	Yea
Joseph S. Clark Jr.	D	Pennsylvania	Yea
John Sherman Cooper	R	Kentucky	Yea
Norris Cotton	R	New Hampshire	Nay
Carl Curtis	R	Nebraska	Yea
Everett Dirksen	R	Illinois	Yea
Thomas J. Dodd	D	Connecticut	Yea
Peter H. Dominick	R	Colorado	Yea
Paul Douglas	D	Illinois	Yea
James Eastland	D	Mississippi	Nay
J. Howard Edmondson	D	Oklahoma	Yea
Allen J. Ellender	D	Louisiana	Nay
Clair Engle	D	California	Yea
Sam Ervin	D	North Carolina	Nay
Hiram Fong	R	Hawaii	Yea
J. William Fulbright	D	Arkansas	Nay
Barry Goldwater	R	Arizona	Nay
Albert Gore Sr.	D	Tennessee	Nay
Ernest Gruening	D	Alaska	Yea
Philip Hart	D	Michigan	Yea
Vance Hartke	D	Indiana	Yea
Carl Hayden	D	Arizona	Yea
Bourke B. Hickenlooper	R	Iowa	Nay
J. Lister Hill	D	Alabama	Nay
Spessard Holland	D	Florida	Nay
Roman Hruska	R	Nebraska	Yea
Hubert Humphrey	D	Minnesota	Yea
Daniel Inouye	D	Hawaii	Yea
Henry M. Jackson	D	Washington	Yea
Jacob Javits	R	New York	Yea
Olin D. Johnston	D	South Carolina	Nay
Len Jordan	R	Idaho	Yea
B. Everett Jordan	D	North Carolina	Nay
Kenneth Keating	R	New York	Yea
Ted Kennedy	D	Massachusetts	Yea
Thomas Kuchel	R	California	Yea
Frank Lausche	D	Ohio	Yea
Russell B. Long	D	Louisiana	Nay
Edward V. Long	D	Missouri	Yea
Warren Magnuson	D	Washington	Yea
Mike Mansfield	D	Montana	Yea
Eugene McCarthy	D	Minnesota	Yea
John L. McClellan	D	Arkansas	Nay
Gale W. McGee	D	Wyoming	Yea
George McGovern	D	South Dakota	Yea
Thomas J. McIntyre	D	New Hampshire	Yea
Patrick V. McNamara	D	Michigan	Yea
Edwin L. Mechem	R	New Mexico	Nay
Lee Metcalf	D	Montana	Yea
Jack Miller	R	Iowa	Yea
Mike Monroney	D	Oklahoma	Yea
Wayne Morse	D	Oregon	Yea
Thruston Ballard Morton	R	Kentucky	Yea
Frank Moss	D	Utah	Yea
Karl Mundt	R	South Dakota	Yea
Edmund Muskie	D	Maine	Yea
Gaylord Nelson	D	Wisconsin	Yea
Maurine Neuberger	D	Oregon	Yea
John Pastore	D	Rhode Island	Yea
James B. Pearson	R	Kansas	Yea
Claiborne Pell	D	Rhode Island	Yea
Winston L. Prouty	R	Vermont	Yea
William Proxmire	D	Wisconsin	Yea
Jennings Randolph	D	West Virginia	Yea
Abraham Ribicoff	D	Connecticut	Yea
A. Willis Robertson	D	Virginia	Nay
Richard Russell Jr.	D	Georgia	Nay
Leverett Saltonstall	R	Massachusetts	Yea
Hugh Scott	R	Pennsylvania	Yea
Milward Simpson	R	Wyoming	Nay
George Smathers	D	Florida	Nay
Margaret Chase Smith	R	Maine	Yea
John Sparkman	D	Alabama	Nay
John C. Stennis	D	Mississippi	Nay
Stuart Symington	D	Missouri	Yea
Herman Talmadge	D	Georgia	Nay
Strom Thurmond	D	South Carolina	Nay
John Tower	R	Texas	Nay
Herbert S. Walters	D	Tennessee	Nay
John J. Williams	R	Delaware	Yea
Harrison A. Williams	D	New Jersey	Yea
Ralph Yarborough	D	Texas	Yea
Milton Young	R	North Dakota	Yea
Stephen M. Young	D	Ohio	Yea

Totals are in Yea–Nay format:

- Original House version: 290–130 (69–31%)
- Cloture in the Senate: 71–29
- Senate version: 73–27
- Senate version, as voted on by the House: 289–126 (70–30%)

==== By party ====
Original House version:

- Democratic Party: 152–96 (61–39%)
- Republican Party: 138–34 (80–20%)

Cloture in the Senate:

- Democratic Party: 44–23 (66–34%)
- Republican Party: 27–6 (82–18%)

Senate version:

- Democratic Party: 46–21 (69–31%)
- Republican Party: 27–6 (82–18%)

Senate version, voted on by the House:

- Democratic Party: 153–91 (63–37%)
- Republican Party: 136–35 (80–20%)

==== By region ====
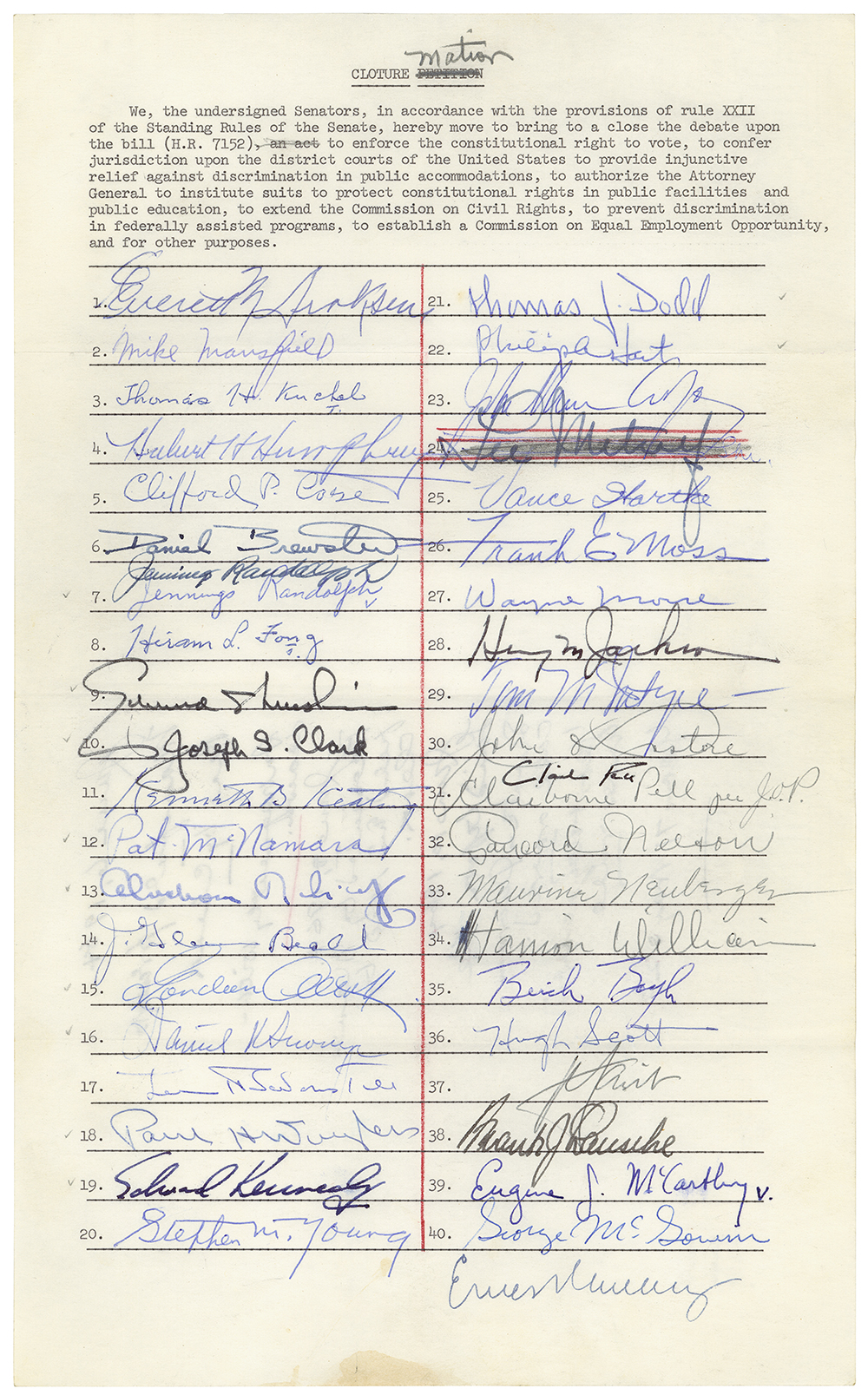
The Cloture Vote for the Civil Rights Act of 1964

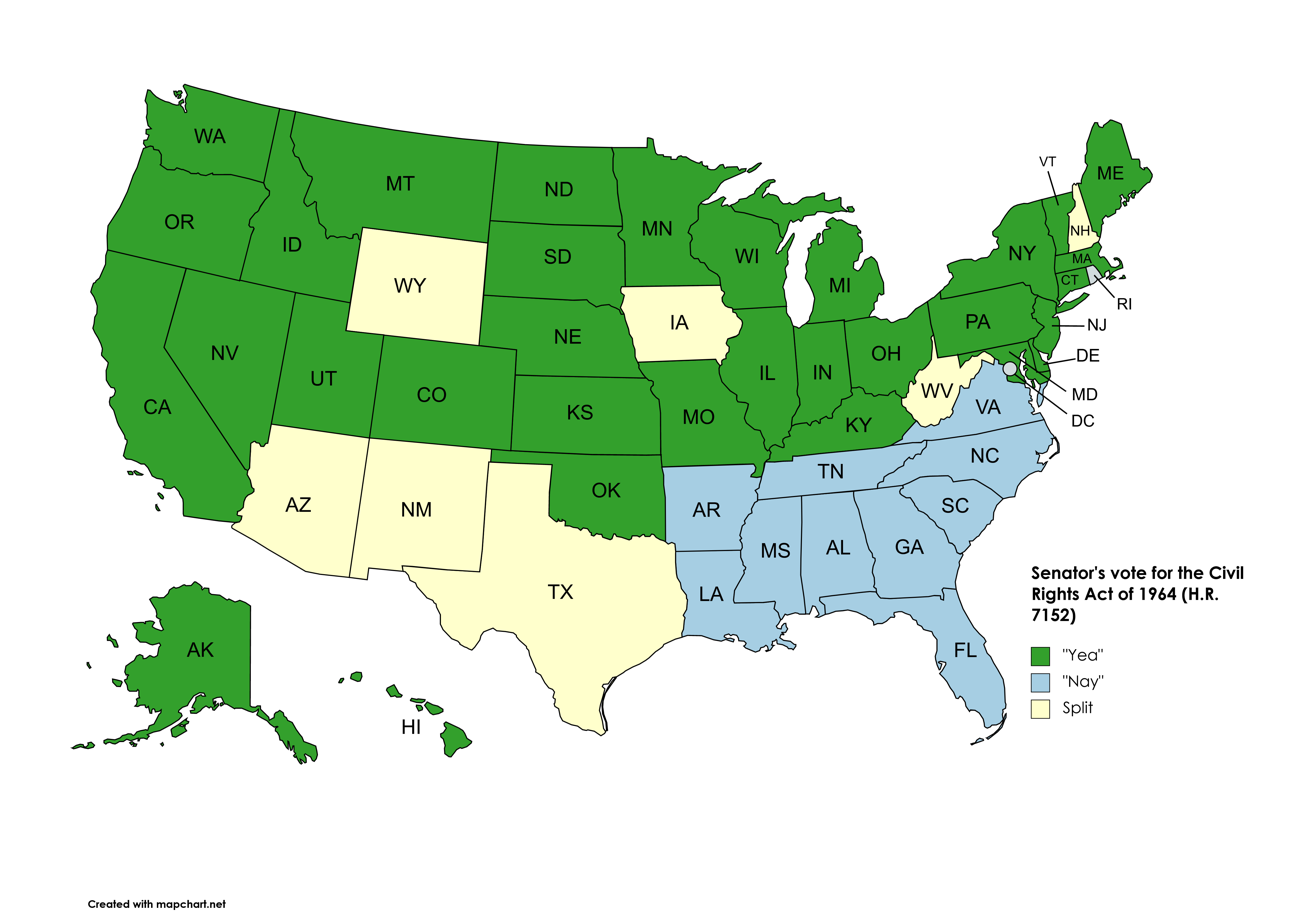
Senate vote on the Civil Rights Act of 1964

Note that "Southern", as used here, only refers to members of Congress from the 11 states that had made up the Confederate States of America in the American Civil War. "Northern" refers to members from the other 39 states, regardless of their geographic location including Southern states like Kentucky.

House of Representatives:

- Northern: 281–32 (90–10%)
- Southern: 8–94 (8–92%)

Senate:

- Northern: 72–6 (92–8%)
- Southern: 1–21 (5–95%) – Ralph Yarborough of Texas was the only Southerner to vote in favor in the Senate

==== By party and region ====
"Remarks upon Signing the Civil Rights Act of 1964"
Public statement by Lyndon B. Johnson of July 2, 1964, about the Civil Rights Act of 1964.

"Remarks upon Signing the Civil Rights Act of 1964"
audio only

House of Representatives:

- Southern Democrats: 8–83 (9–91%) – four Representatives from Texas (Jack Brooks, Albert Thomas, J. J. Pickle, and Henry González), two from Tennessee (Richard Fulton and Ross Bass), Claude Pepper of Florida and Charles L. Weltner of Georgia voted in favor
- Southern Republicans: 0–11 (0–100%)
- Northern Democrats: 145–8 (95–5%)
- Northern Republicans: 136–24 (85–15%)

Note that four Representatives voted Present while 13 did not vote.

Senate:

- Southern Democrats: 1–20 (5–95%) – only Ralph Yarborough of Texas voted in favor
- Southern Republicans: 0–1 (0–100%) – John Tower of Texas, the only Southern Republican at the time, voted against
- Northern Democrats: 45–1 (98–2%) – only Robert Byrd of West Virginia voted against
- Northern Republicans: 27–5 (84–16%) – Norris Cotton (NH), Barry Goldwater (AZ), Bourke B. Hickenlooper (IA), Edwin L. Mechem (NM), and Milward Simpson (WY) voted against

=== Aspects ===
==== Women's rights ====
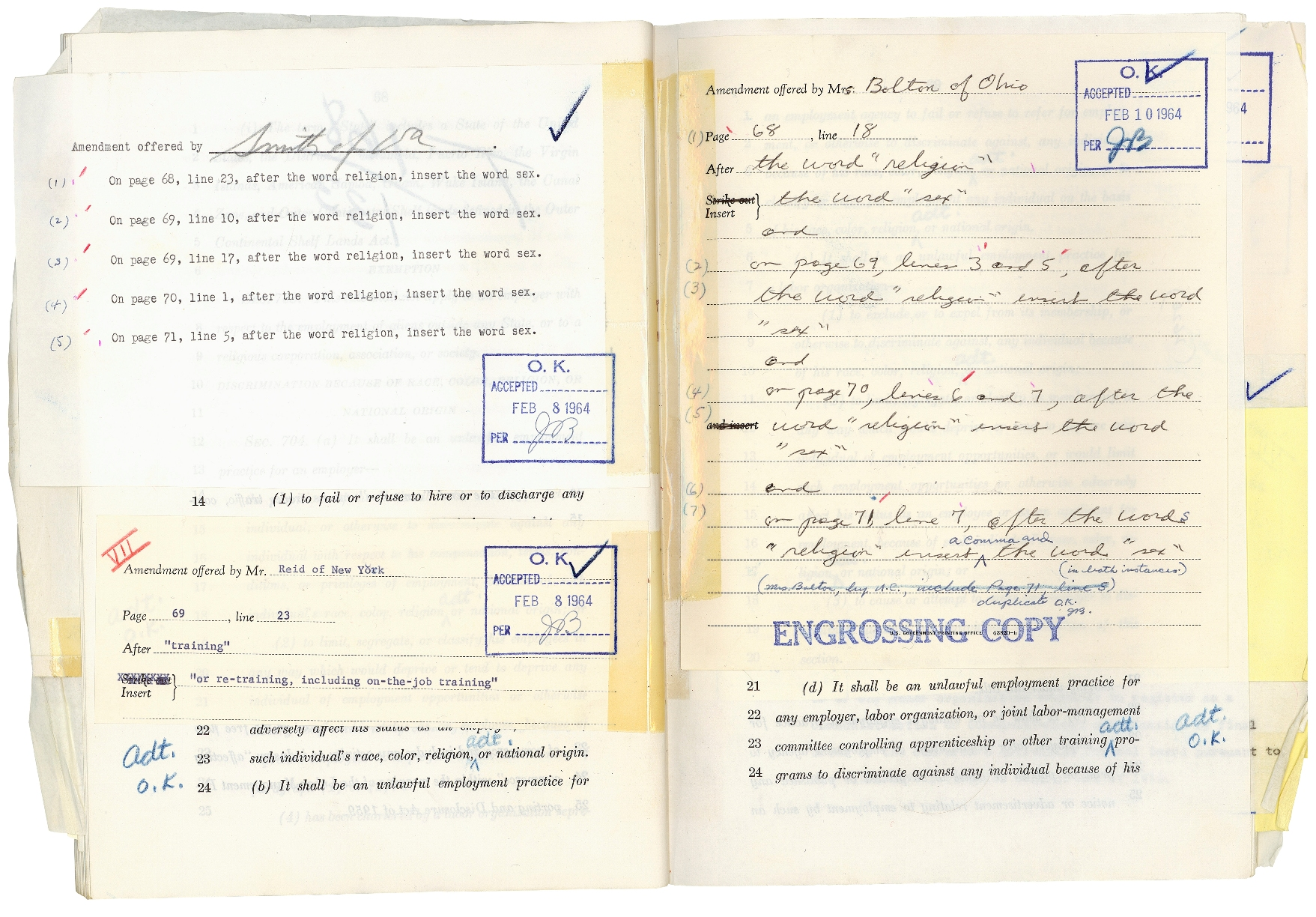
Engrossing copy of H.R. 7152, which added sex to the categories of persons against whom the bill prohibited discrimination, as passed by the House of Representatives

One year earlier, the same Congress had passed the Equal Pay Act of 1963, which prohibited wage differentials based on sex. The prohibition on sex discrimination was added to the Civil Rights Act by Howard W. Smith, a powerful Virginia Democrat who chaired the House Rules Committee and strongly opposed the legislation. Smith's amendment was passed by a teller vote of 168 to 133. Historians debate whether Smith cynically attempted to defeat the bill because he opposed civil rights for Black people and women or attempted to support their rights by broadening the bill to include women. Smith expected that Republicans, who had included equal rights for women in their party's platform since 1944, would probably vote for the amendment. Historians speculate that Smith was trying to embarrass northern Democrats who opposed civil rights for women because labor unions opposed the clause. Representative Carl Elliott of Alabama later said, "Smith didn't give a damn about women's rights", as "he was trying to knock off votes either then or down the line because there was always a hard core of men who didn't favor women's rights", and according to the Congressional Record, laughter greeted Smith when he introduced the amendment.

Smith asserted that he was not joking and sincerely supported the amendment. Along with Representative Martha Griffiths, he was the amendment's chief spokesperson. For 20 years, Smith had sponsored the Equal Rights Amendment (with no linkage to racial issues) in the House because he believed in it. For decades he had been close to the National Woman's Party and its leader Alice Paul, who had been a leading figure in winning the right to vote for women in 1920, co-authored the first Equal Rights Amendment, and had been a chief supporter of equal rights proposals since then. She and other feminists had worked with Smith since 1945 to find a way to include sex as a protected civil rights category, and felt now was the moment. Griffiths argued that the new law would protect black women but not white women, and that that was unfair to white women. Black feminist lawyer Pauli Murray wrote a supportive memorandum at the behest of the National Federation of Business and Professional Women. Griffiths also argued that the laws "protecting" women from unpleasant jobs were actually designed to enable men to monopolize those jobs, and that that was unfair to women who were not allowed to try out for those jobs. The amendment passed with the votes of Republicans and Southern Democrats. The final law passed with the votes of Republicans and Northern Democrats. Thus, as Justice William Rehnquist wrote in Meritor Savings Bank v. Vinson, "The prohibition against discrimination based on sex was added to Title VII at the last minute on the floor of the House of Representatives [...] the bill quickly passed as amended, and we are left with little legislative history to guide us in interpreting the Act's prohibition against discrimination based on 'sex.'"

==== Desegregation ====
One of the bill's opponents' most damaging arguments was that once passed, the bill would require forced busing to achieve certain racial quotas in schools. The bill's proponents, such as Emanuel Celler and Jacob Javits, said it would not authorize such measures. Leading sponsor Hubert Humphrey wrote two amendments specifically designed to outlaw busing. Humphrey said, "if the bill were to compel it, it would be a violation [of the Constitution], because it would be handling the matter on the basis of race and we would be transporting children because of race." Javits said any government official who sought to use the bill for busing purposes "would be making a fool of himself", but two years later the Department of Health, Education and Welfare said that Southern school districts would be required to meet mathematical ratios of students by busing.

== Aftermath ==
=== Political repercussions ===
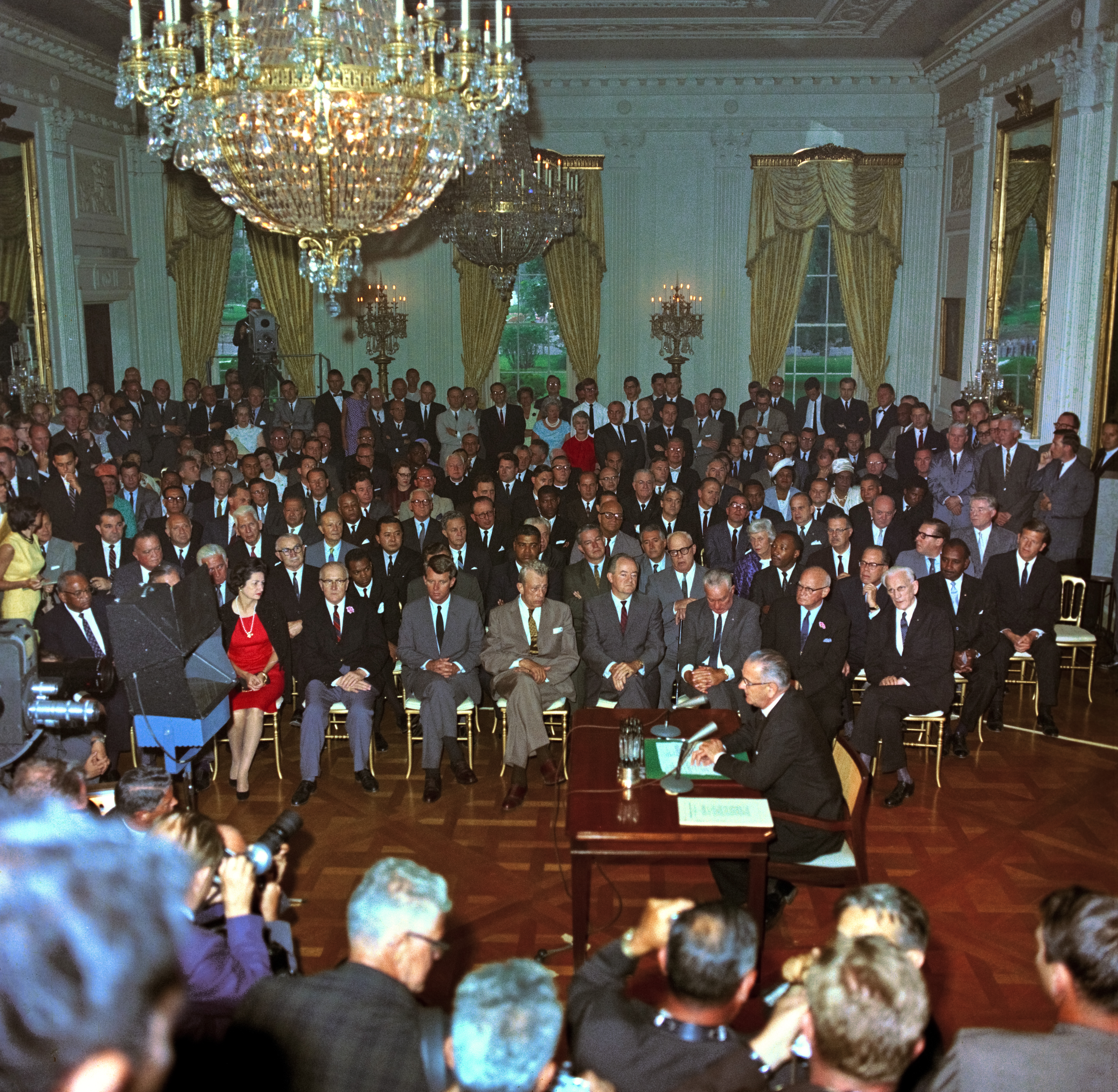
U.S. president Lyndon B. Johnson speaks to a television camera at the signing of the Civil Rights Act in 1964.

The bill divided both major American political parties and engendered a long-term change in the demographics of the support for each. President Kennedy realized that supporting this bill would risk losing the South's overwhelming support of the Democratic Party. Both Attorney General Robert F. Kennedy and Vice President Johnson had pushed for the introduction of the civil rights legislation. Johnson told Kennedy aide Ted Sorensen that "I know the risks are great and we might lose the South, but those sorts of states may be lost anyway." Senator Richard Russell, Jr. later warned President Johnson that his strong support for the civil rights bill "will not only cost you the South, it will cost you the election". Johnson, however, went on to win the 1964 election by one of the biggest landslides in American history. The South, which had five states swing Republican in 1964, became a stronghold of the Republican Party by the 1990s.

Although majorities in both parties voted for the bill, there were notable exceptions. Though he opposed forced segregation, Republican 1964 presidential candidate, Senator Barry Goldwater of Arizona, voted against the bill, remarking, "You can't legislate morality." Goldwater had supported previous attempts to pass civil rights legislation in 1957 and 1960 as well as the 24th Amendment outlawing the poll tax. He stated that the reason for his opposition to the 1964 bill was Title II, which in his opinion violated individual liberty and states' rights. Democrats and Republicans from the Southern states opposed the bill and led an unsuccessful 60 working day filibuster, including senators Albert Gore, Sr. (D-TN) and J. William Fulbright (D-AR), as well as Senator Robert Byrd (D-WV), who personally filibustered for 14 hours straight.

=== Continued resistance ===
There were white business owners who claimed that Congress did not have the constitutional authority to ban segregation in public accommodations. For example, Moreton Rolleston, the owner of a motel in Atlanta, Georgia, said he should not be forced to serve black travelers, saying, "the fundamental question [...] is whether or not Congress has the power to take away the liberty of an individual to run his business as he sees fit in the selection and choice of his customers". Rolleston claimed that the Civil Rights Act of 1964 was a breach of the Fourteenth Amendment and also violated the Fifth and Thirteenth Amendments by depriving him of "liberty and property without due process". In Heart of Atlanta Motel v. United States (1964), the Supreme Court held that Congress drew its authority from the Constitution's Commerce Clause, rejecting Rolleston's claims.

Resistance to the public accommodation clause continued for years on the ground, especially in the South. When local college students in Orangeburg, South Carolina, attempted to desegregate a bowling alley in 1968, they were violently attacked, leading to rioting and what became known as the "Orangeburg massacre". Resistance by school boards continued into the next decade, with the most significant declines in black-white school segregation only occurring at the end of the 1960s and the start of the 1970s in the aftermath of the Green v. County School Board of New Kent County (1968) court decision.

=== Later impact on LGBT rights ===
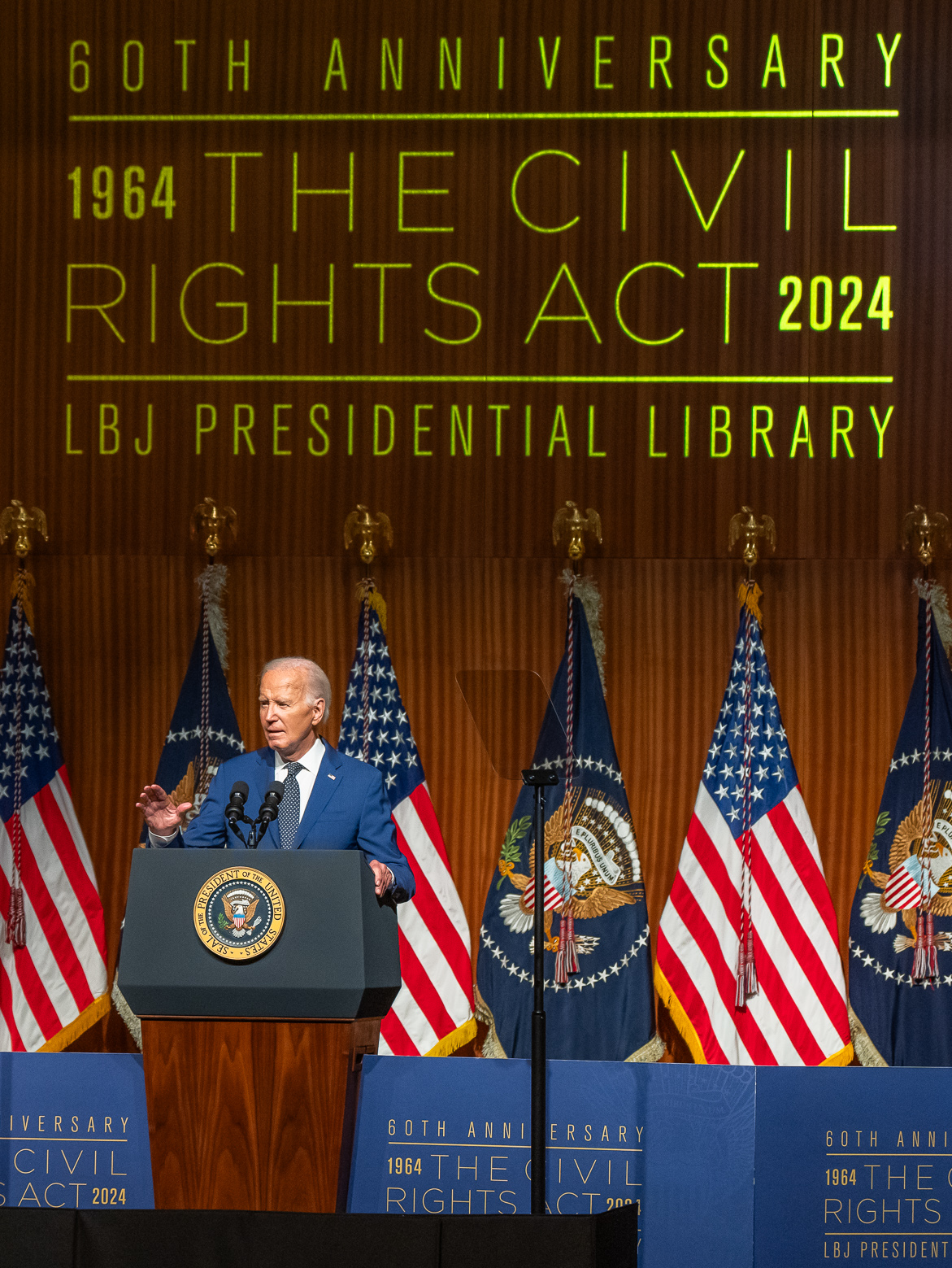
President Joe Biden speaks at an event celebrating the 60th Anniversary of the Civil Rights Act on July 29, 2024, at the Lyndon B. Johnson Presidential Library and Museum in Austin, Texas.

In June 2020, the U.S. Supreme Court ruled in three cases (Bostock v. Clayton County, Altitude Express, Inc. v. Zarda, and R.G. & G.R. Harris Funeral Homes Inc. v. Equal Employment Opportunity Commission) that Title VII of the Civil Rights Act, which barred employers from discriminating on the basis of sex, precluded employers from discriminating on the basis of sexual orientation or gender identity. Afterward, USA Today stated that in addition to LGBTQ employment discrimination, "[t]he court's ruling is likely to have a sweeping impact on federal civil rights laws barring sex discrimination in education, health care, housing and financial credit."

== Titles ==
=== Title I – voting rights ===
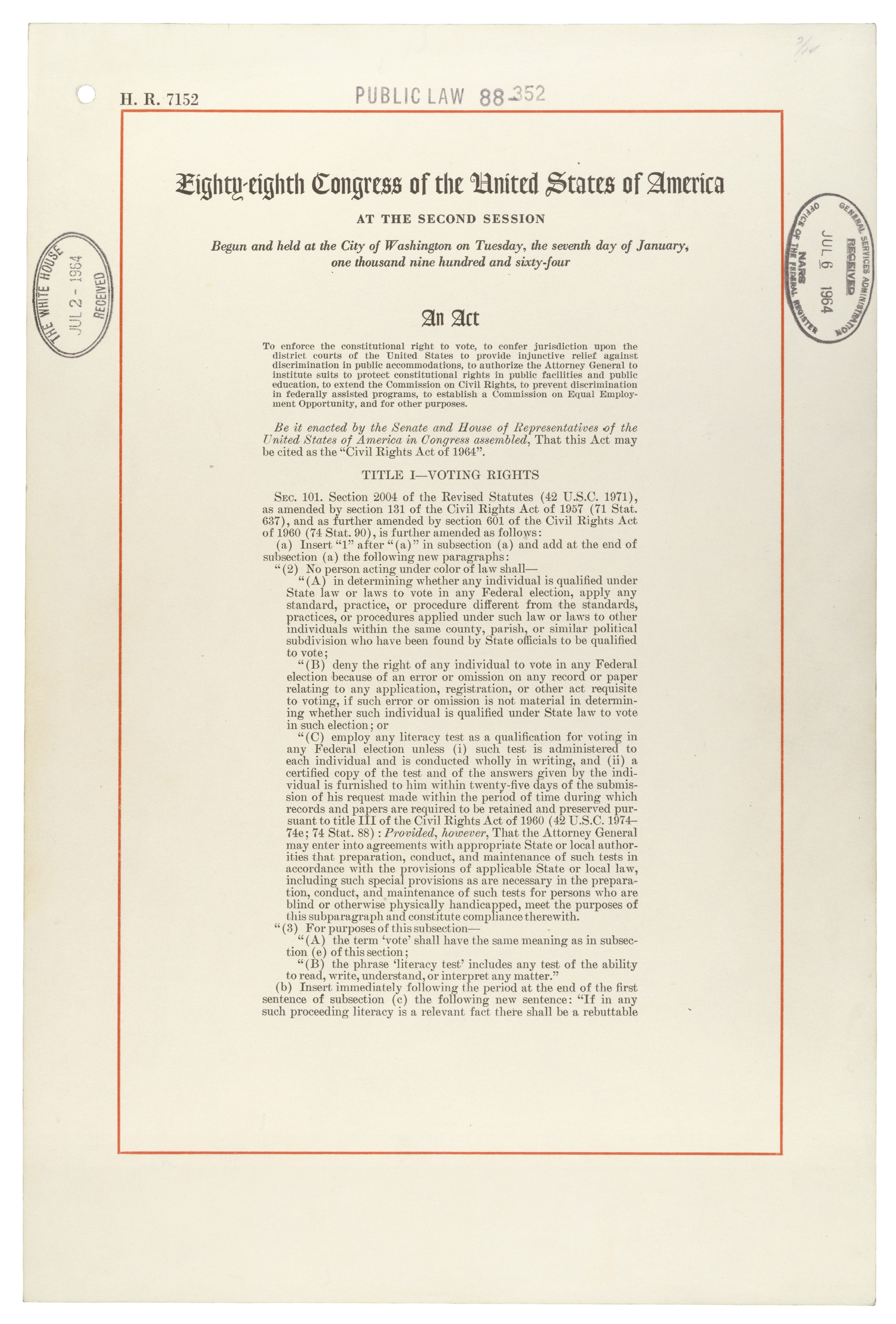
First page of the Civil Rights Act of 1964

Title I barred unequal application of voter registration requirements. This title did not eliminate literacy tests (which acted as one barrier for black voters, other racial minorities, and poor whites in the South) or address economic retaliation, police repression, or physical violence against nonwhite voters. While the Act did require that voting rules and procedures be applied equally to all races, it did not abolish the concept of voter "qualification". It accepted the idea that citizens do not have an automatic right to vote but would have to meet standards beyond citizenship. The Voting Rights Act of 1965 directly addressed and eliminated most voting qualifications beyond citizenship, eliminating literacy tests.

=== Title II – public accommodations ===
Title II outlawed discrimination based on race, color, religion, or national origin in hotels, motels, restaurants, theaters, and all other public accommodations engaged in interstate commerce; Title II defined "public accommodations" as establishments that serve the public. It exempted private clubs, without defining the term "private", or other establishments not open to the public.

=== Title III – desegregation of public facilities ===
Title III prohibited state and municipal governments from denying access to public facilities on grounds of race, color, religion, or national origin.

=== Title IV – desegregation of public education ===
Title IV enforced the desegregation of public schools and authorized the U.S. Attorney General to file suits to enforce said act.

=== Title V – Commission on Civil Rights ===
Title V expanded the Civil Rights Commission established by the earlier Civil Rights Act of 1957 with additional powers, rules, and procedures.

=== Title VI – nondiscrimination in federally assisted programs ===
Title VI prevents discrimination by programs and activities that receive federal funds. If a recipient of federal funds is found in violation of Title VI, that recipient may lose its federal funding.

General

This title declares it to be the policy of the United States that discrimination on the ground of race, color, or national origin shall not occur in connection with programs and activities receiving Federal financial assistance and authorizes and directs the appropriate federal departments and agencies to take action to carry out this policy. This title is not intended to apply to foreign assistance programs. Section 601 – This section states the general principle that no person in the United States shall be excluded from participation in or otherwise discriminated against on the ground of race, color, or national origin under any program or activity receiving Federal financial assistance.

Section 602 directs each federal agency administering a program of federal financial assistance by way of grant, contract, or loan to take action pursuant to rule, regulation, or order of general applicability to effectuate the principle of section 601 in a manner consistent with the achievement of the objectives of the statute authorizing the assistance. In seeking the effect compliance with its requirements imposed under this section, an agency is authorized to terminate or to refuse to grant or to continue assistance under a program to any recipient as to whom there has been an express finding pursuant to a hearing of a failure to comply with the requirements under that program, and it may also employ any other means authorized by law. However, each agency is directed first to seek compliance with its requirements by voluntary means.

Section 603 provides that any agency action taken pursuant to section 602 shall be subject to such judicial review as would be available for similar actions by that agency on other grounds. Where the agency action consists of terminating or refusing to grant or to continue financial assistance because of a finding of a failure of the recipient to comply with the agency's requirements imposed under section 602, and the agency action would not otherwise be subject to judicial review under existing law, judicial review shall nevertheless be available to any person aggrieved as provided in section 10 of the Administrative Procedure Act (5 U.S.C. § 1009). The section also states explicitly that in the latter situation such agency action shall not be deemed committed to unreviewable agency discretion within the meaning of section 10. The purpose of this provision is to obviate the possible argument that although section 603 provides for review in accordance with section 10, section 10 itself has an exception for action "committed to agency discretion", which might otherwise be carried over into section 603. It is not the purpose of this provision of section 603, however, otherwise to alter the scope of judicial review as presently provided in section 10(e) of the Administrative Procedure Act.

==== Reinterpretation of Title VI ====
Attorney Kenneth L. Marcus, while working at the Office for Civil Rights of the US Department of Education (2004–2008), reinterpreted Title VI, which had been established to protect against racial discrimination in Jim Crow laws affecting education, to include protections against discrimination on the basis of religion, particularly "when an affected student's 'shared ancestry' would have been treated as a 'race' in earlier jurisprudence". According to Jason Brownlee, Marcus "subsequently became one of the preeminent advocates for applying Title VI against speech and events criticizing Israeli repression of Palestinians, deeds Marcus considered antisemitic", and advocated for the adoption of the IHRA definition of antisemitism. According to Gavriella Fried, in the following two decades, "at least eighteen Title VI complaints have been filed against U.S. colleges and universities, alleging that Palestinian rights activists' political expression is a form of anti-Semitism."

A 2015 Palestine Legal report included complaints based on Title VI as one of nine components in the "widespread and growing suppression of Palestinian human rights advocacy", recorded in about 250 such instances, which it describes as the Palestine exception to free speech.

2019 Executive Order

The December 11, 2019, executive order on combating antisemitism states: "While Title VI does not cover discrimination based on religion, individuals who face discrimination on the basis of race, color, or national origin do not lose protection under Title VI for also being a member of a group that shares common religious practices. Discrimination against Jews may give rise to a Title VI violation when the discrimination is based on an individual's race, color, or national origin. It shall be the policy of the executive branch to enforce Title VI against prohibited forms of discrimination rooted in antisemitism as vigorously as against all other forms of discrimination prohibited by Title VI." The order specifies that agencies responsible for Title VI enforcement shall "consider" the (non-legally binding) working definition of antisemitism adopted by the International Holocaust Remembrance Alliance (IHRA) on May 26, 2016, as well as the IHRA list of Contemporary Examples of Anti-Semitism, "to the extent that any examples might be useful as evidence of discriminatory intent".

2025 Executive Order

In April 2025, President Trump issued Executive Order 14281 which orders, "the Attorney General shall initiate appropriate action to repeal or amend the implementing regulations for Title VI of the Civil Rights Act of 1964 for all agencies to the extent they contemplate disparate-impact liability".

On December 10, 2025, the U.S. Department of Justice issued a rule stating that proof of intent is henceforth the sole basis for discrimination claims and ending the use of statistical disparities, also called disparate-impact liability. It ended a practice of evaluating policies or practices that seemed neutral but disproportionately harmed a protected group. Civil rights enforcement agencies and courts may find actionable discrimination only with evidence of explicit intent.

=== Title VII – equal employment opportunity ===
Title VII of the act, codified as Subchapter VI of Chapter 21 of Title 42 of the United States Code, prohibits discrimination by covered employers on the basis of race, color, religion, sex, or national origin (see 42 U.S.C. § 2000e-2). Title VII applies to and covers an employer "who has fifteen (15) or more employees for each working day in each of twenty or more calendar weeks in the current or preceding calendar year" as written in the Definitions section under 42 U.S.C. §2000e(b). Title VII also prohibits discrimination against an individual because of their association with another individual of a particular race, color, religion, sex, or national origin, such as by an interracial marriage. The EEO Title VII has also been supplemented with legislation prohibiting pregnancy, age, and disability discrimination (see Pregnancy Discrimination Act of 1978, Age Discrimination in Employment Act, Americans with Disabilities Act of 1990).

In very narrowly defined situations, an employer is permitted to discriminate on the basis of a protected trait if the trait is a bona fide occupational qualification (BFOQ) reasonably necessary to the normal operation of that particular business or enterprise. To make a BFOQ defense, an employer must prove three elements: a direct relationship between the trait and the ability to perform the job; the BFOQ's relation to the "essence" or "central mission of the employer's business", and that there is no less restrictive or reasonable alternative (United Automobile Workers v. Johnson Controls, Inc., 499 U.S. 187 (1991), 111 S. Ct. 1196). BFOQ is an extremely narrow exception to the general prohibition of discrimination based on protected traits (Dothard v. Rawlinson, 433 U.S. 321 (1977) 97 S. Ct. 2720). An employer or customer's preference for an individual of a particular religion is not sufficient to establish a BFOQ (Equal Employment Opportunity Commission v. Kamehameha School – Bishop Estate, 990 F.2d 458 (9th Cir. 1993)).

Title VII allows any employer, labor organization, joint labor-management committee, or employment agency to bypass the "unlawful employment practice" for any person involved with the Communist Party of the United States or of any other organization required to register as a Communist-action or Communist-front organization by final order of the Subversive Activities Control Board pursuant to the Subversive Activities Control Act of 1950.

There are partial and whole exceptions to Title VII for four types of employers:

- Federal government; (the proscriptions against employment discrimination under Title VII are now applicable to certain federal government offices under 42 U.S.C. Section 2000e-16)
- Federally recognized Native American tribes;
- Religious groups performing work connected to the group's activities, including associated education institutions;
- Bona fide nonprofit private membership organizations

The Bennett Amendment is a U.S. labor law provision in Title VII that limits sex discrimination claims regarding pay to the rules in the Equal Pay Act of 1963. It says an employer can "differentiate upon the basis of sex" when it compensates employees "if such differentiation is authorized by" the Equal Pay Act.

The Equal Employment Opportunity Commission (EEOC), as well as certain state fair employment practices agencies (FEPAs), enforce Title VII (see 42 U.S.C. § 2000e-4). The EEOC and state FEPAs investigate, mediate, and may file lawsuits on employees' behalf. Where a state law contradicts federal law, it is overridden. Every state except Arkansas and Mississippi maintains a state FEPA (see EEOC and state FEPA directory ). Title VII also provides that an individual can bring a private lawsuit. They must file a complaint of discrimination with the EEOC within 180 days of learning of the discrimination or they may lose the right to file suit. Title VII applies only to employers who employ 15 or more employees for 20 or more weeks in the current or preceding calendar year (42 U.S.C. § 2000e#b).

2025 executive order

In April 2025, President Trump issued Executive Order 14281 which orders, within 45 days, the attorney general and the chair of the Equal Employment Opportunity Commission, "shall assess all pending investigations, civil suits, or positions taken in ongoing matters under every Federal civil rights law within their respective jurisdictions, including Title VII of the Civil Rights Act of 1964, that rely on a theory of disparate-impact liability, and shall take appropriate action with respect to such matters consistent with the policy of this order."

In January 2026, the EEOC voted 2-1 to require commissioner approval for most lawsuits, transferring litigation authority from the General Counsel to the Chair and Commissioners. The change consolidated power under the Commission's Republican majority. The General Counsel retained limited authority during quorum loss. Commission Chair Andrea Lucas said in a statement the modification restored authority originally granted to the Commission by Congress under Title VII.

==== Administrative precedents ====
In 2012, the EEOC ruled that employment discrimination on the basis of gender identity or transgender status is prohibited under Title VII. The decision held that discrimination on the basis of gender identity qualified as discrimination on the basis of sex whether the discrimination was due to sex stereotyping, discomfort with a transition, or discrimination due to a perceived change in the individual's sex. In 2014, the EEOC initiated two lawsuits against private companies for discrimination on the basis of gender identity, with additional litigation under consideration. As of November 2014, Commissioner Chai Feldblum is making an active effort to increase awareness of Title VII remedies for individuals discriminated against on the basis of sexual orientation or gender identity.

On December 15, 2014, under a memorandum issued by Attorney General Eric Holder, the United States Department of Justice (DOJ) took a position aligned with the EEOC's, namely that the prohibition of sex discrimination under Title VII encompassed the prohibition of discrimination based on gender identity or transgender status. DOJ had already stopped opposing claims of discrimination brought by federal transgender employees. The EEOC in 2015 reissued another non-binding memo, reaffirming its stance that sexual orientation was protected under Title VII.

In October 2017, Attorney General Jeff Sessions withdrew the Holder memorandum. According to a copy of Sessions' directive reviewed by BuzzFeed News, he stated that Title VII should be narrowly interpreted to cover discrimination between "men and women". Sessions stated that as a matter of law, "Title VII does not prohibit discrimination based on gender identity per se." Devin O'Malley, on behalf of the DOJ, said, "the last administration abandoned that fundamental principle [that the Department of Justice cannot expand the law beyond what Congress has provided], which necessitated today's action." Sharon McGowan, a lawyer with Lambda Legal who previously served in the Civil Rights division of DOJ, rejected that argument, saying "[T]his memo is not actually a reflection of the law as it is – it's a reflection of what the DOJ wishes the law were" and "The Justice Department is actually getting back in the business of making anti-transgender law in court." But the EEOC did not change its stance, putting it at odds with the DOJ in certain cases.

=== Title VIII – registration and voting statistics ===
Title VIII required compilation of voter-registration and voting data in geographic areas specified by the Commission on Civil Rights.

=== Title IX – intervention and removal of cases ===
Title IX made it easier to move civil rights cases from U.S. state courts to federal court. This was of crucial importance to civil rights activists who contended that they could not get fair trials in state courts.

=== Title X – Community Relations Service ===
Title X established the Community Relations Service, tasked with assisting in community disputes involving claims of discrimination. It was originally an agency of the Department of Commerce, and later moved to the Department of Justice.

=== Title XI – miscellaneous ===
Title XI gives a defendant accused of certain categories of criminal contempt in a matter arising under title II, III, IV, V, VI, or VII of the Act the right to a jury trial. If convicted, the defendant can be fined an amount not to exceed $1,000 or imprisoned for not more than six months.

== Major amendments ==
=== Equal Employment Opportunity Act of 1972 ===
Between 1965 and 1972, Title VII lacked any strong enforcement provisions. Instead, the Equal Employment Opportunity Commission was authorized only to investigate external claims of discrimination. The EEOC could then refer cases to the Justice Department for litigation if reasonable cause was found. The EEOC documented the nature and magnitude of discriminatory employment practices, the first study of this kind done.

In 1972, Congress passed the Equal Employment Opportunity Act. The Act amended Title VII and gave EEOC authority to initiate its own enforcement litigation. The EEOC now played a major role in guiding judicial interpretations of civil rights legislation.

== United States Supreme Court cases ==
=== Title II case law ===
==== Heart of Atlanta Motel, Inc. v. United States (1964) ====
After the Civil Rights Act of 1964 was passed, the Supreme Court upheld the law's application to the private sector, on the grounds that Congress has the power to regulate commerce between the States. The landmark case Heart of Atlanta Motel v. United States established the law's constitutionality, but did not settle all the legal questions surrounding it.

=== Title VI case law ===
==== Lau v. Nichols (1974) ====
In the 1974 case Lau v. Nichols, the Supreme Court ruled that the San Francisco school district was violating non-English speaking students' rights under the 1964 act by placing them in regular classes rather than providing some sort of accommodation for them.

=== Title VII case law ===
==== Phillips v. Martin Marietta Corp. (1971) ====
In Phillips v. Martin Marietta Corp., a 1971 Supreme Court case about the Act's gender provisions, the Court ruled that a company could not discriminate against a potential female employee because she had a preschool-age child unless it did the same with potential male employees. A federal court overruled an Ohio state law that barred women from obtaining jobs that required the ability to lift 25 pounds and required women but not men to take lunch breaks. In Pittsburgh Press Co. v. Pittsburgh Commission on Human Relations, the Supreme Court decided that printing separate job listings for men and women is illegal, ending that practice at the country's newspapers. The United States Civil Service Commission ended the practice of designating federal jobs "women only" or "men only".

==== TWA v. Hardison (1977) ====
A landmark United States Supreme Court case on religion and business, holding that employers may fire employees who refuse to work on the seventh-day in observation of a biblical sabbath.

==== Meritor Savings Bank v. Vinson (1986) ====
Meritor Savings Bank v. Vinson, 477 U.S. 57 (1986) determined that sexual harassment is considered discrimination based on sex.

==== Price Waterhouse v. Hopkins (1989) ====
Price Waterhouse v. Hopkins, 490 U.S. 228 (1989) established that discrimination related to non-conformity of gender stereotypical behavior is unallowable under Title VII.

==== Oncale v. Sundowner Offshore Services (1998) ====
Oncale v. Sundowner Offshore Services, Inc., 523 U.S. 75 (1998) further ruled that same-sex harassment is discrimination under Title VII.

==== Burlington Northern & Santa Fe Railway Co. v. White (2006) ====
On June 22, 2006, in Burlington Northern & Santa Fe Railway Co. v. White, the Supreme Court held that White's reassignment to from forklift operator to less desirable duties as a track laborer as well as her suspension without pay after complaining about workplace sexual harassment constituted retaliatory discrimination. This was a landmark case because it clarified that Title VII's retaliation provision is not confined to harmful acts occurring at the workplace or are related to employment. Title VII's anti-discrimination provision prevents actions including a hire, a discharge, a change in compensation, conditions, privileges, opportunities, or status of employment. However, Title VII's retaliation provision contains no such limiting language. The definition of retaliation against a complainant of sexual harassment was changed to encompass any unfavorable job decision or treatment that might deter a "reasonable worker" from filing a discrimination claim or from supporting one.

==== Bostock v. Clayton County (2020) and Altitude Express, Inc. v. Zarda (2020) ====
On June 15, 2020, in Bostock v. Clayton County, the Supreme Court ruled 6–3 that Title VII protections against workplace discrimination on the basis of sex apply to discrimination against LGBT individuals. In the opinion, Justice Neil Gorsuch wrote that a business that discriminates against homosexual or transgender individuals is discriminating "for traits or actions it would not have questioned in members of a different sex". Thus discrimination against homosexual and transgender employees is a form of sex discrimination, which is forbidden under Title VII.

Bostock was consolidated with Altitude Express, Inc. v. Zarda. Before the Supreme Court's intervention, there was a split in the circuit courts, including these two cases as well as Evans v. Georgia Regional Hospital in the Eleventh Circuit.

==== R.G. & G.R. Harris Funeral Homes Inc. v. Equal Employment Opportunity Commission (2020) ====
R.G. & G.R. Harris Funeral Homes Inc. v. Equal Employment Opportunity Commission determined that Title VII covers gender identity, including transgender status.

== Influence ==
=== Americans with Disabilities Act of 1990 ===
The Americans with Disabilities Act of 1990 – which has been called "the most important piece of federal legislation since the Civil Rights Act of 1964" – was influenced both by the structure and substance of the previous Civil Rights Act of 1964. The act was arguably of equal importance, and "draws substantially from the structure of that landmark legislation [Civil Rights Act of 1964]". The Americans with Disabilities Act paralleled its landmark predecessor structurally, drawing upon many of the same titles and statutes. For example, "Title I of the ADA, which bans employment discrimination by private employers on the basis of disability, parallels Title VII of the Act". Similarly, Title III of the Americans with Disabilities Act, "which proscribes discrimination on the basis of disability in public accommodations, tracks Title II of the 1964 Act while expanding upon the list of public accommodations covered." The Americans with Disabilities Act extended "the principle of nondiscrimination to people with disabilities", an idea unsought in the United States before the passage of the Civil Rights Act of 1964.

== See also ==
- Affirmative action in the United States
- Angelita C. et al. v. California Department of Pesticide Regulation
- Bennett Amendment
- Bourke B. Hickenlooper
- Civil Rights Movement
- Post–civil rights era in African-American history
- Jews in the civil rights movement
- The Negro Motorist Green Book

=== Other civil rights legislation ===
- Civil Rights Act of 1866
- Civil Rights Act of 1871
- Civil Rights Act of 1991
- Employment Non-Discrimination Act
- Equality Act of 2015 (not passed)
- Enforcement Act of 1870
- First Enforcement Act of 1871
- Second Enforcement Act of 1871
- Voting Rights Act of 1965

== Bibliography ==
- Branch, Taylor (1998), Pillar of Fire: America in the King Years 1963–65, New York: Simon & Schuster.
- Freeman, Jo. "How 'Sex' Got Into Title VII: Persistent Opportunism as a Maker of Public Policy" Law and Inequality: A Journal of Theory and Practice, Vol. 9, No. 2, March 1991, pp. 163–184. online version
- Golway, Terry (2010). JFK: Day by Day: A Chronicle of the 1,036 Days of John F. Kennedy's Presidency. Running Press. ISBN 9780762437429.
- Harrison, Cynthia (1988), On Account of Sex: The Politics of Women's Issues 1945–1968, Berkeley, CA: University of California Press.
- Jeong, Gyung-Ho, Gary J. Miller, and Itai Sened, "Closing the Deal: Negotiating Civil Rights Legislation", American Political Science Review, 103 (Nov. 2009)
- Loevy, Robert D. ed. (1997), The Civil Rights Act of 1964: The Passage of the Law That Ended Racial Segregation, Albany, NY: State University of New York Press.
- Risen, Clay. The Bill of the Century: The Epic Battle for the Civil Rights Act (2014) online
