= James Herard =

American convicted murderer and armed robber

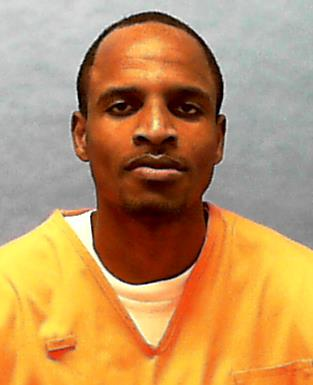
- Herard Mugshot
- Born: August 12, 1989 (age 37); Florida, U.S.
- Status: Incarcerated
- Convictions: First-degree murder (2 counts); Attempted murder (8 counts); Aggravated assault (5 counts); Aggravated battery; Robbery (15 counts); False imprisonment (5 counts); Racketeering; Conspiracy to commit racketeering; Directing gang activities
- Penalty: Death

Details
- Victims: 2 murder victims, multiple robbery victims
- Date: June 20 – November 27, 2008
- Location: Tampa, Florida
- Imprisoned at: Union Correctional Institution

James Herard (born August 12, 1989) is an American convicted murderer and armed robber sentenced to death in Florida. Herard, the purported ringleader of the Crips gang based in Lauderhill, Florida, was one of four gang members who robbed several Dunkin' Donuts stores and shot their victims in each case. One of these cases resulted in the murder of 58-year-old Kiem Huynh on November 27, 2008. Herard also killed 39-year-old Eric Jean-Pierre on November 14, 2008, after ordering a fellow gang member to shoot and kill a random person. While Herard's associates were all sentenced to life in prison for the robberies, Herard was sentenced to death for the murder of Jean-Pierre while receiving life without parole for Huynh's murder, as well as multiple life terms for the robberies and other crimes.

== 2008 crime spree ==
From June to December 2008, James Herard, then a Crips gang leader active in Lauderhill, Florida, committed multiple crimes with three members of his gang: Calvin Weatherspoon, Charles Luke Faustin and Tharod Bell. The spree, which mostly consisted of robberies, would also lead to two murders, which included a victim of one of the robbery cases committed by the gang.

=== Murder of Eric Jean-Pierre ===
On November 14, 2008, James Herard would commit his first murder, killing 39-year-old Eric Jean-Pierre in Lauderhill, Florida.

During the early morning hours, Herard and two of his associates, Bell and Faustin, were looking for a random victim to kill for their "body count competition". While they were driving, they first encountered Eric Jean-Pierre, who did not have any gang affiliations and was walking back home from a bus stop. The trio stopped the car, and Herard ordered Bell to kill Jean-Pierre, and using a 20-gauge shotgun, Bell fired at point blank range towards Jean-Pierre, who died on the spot due to the bullet penetrating his heart and partially destroyed it.

=== Murder of Kiem Huynh ===
On November 27, 2008, barely two weeks after he murdered Jean-Pierre, Herard would kill 58-year-old Kiem Huynh in what was chronologically his fourth and final robbery at a Dunkin' Donuts store to date.

On that day, Herard and Bell entered a Dunkin' Donuts store in Tamarac, Florida, where Huynh, a Vietnamese immigrant, was buying coffee after visiting one of his two sons in West Palm Beach for Thanksgiving Day (which fell on the date of his murder). During the armed holdup, Herard held Huynh and several other customers at gunpoint and in order to show that the robbers were serious, Herard fired his shotgun at Huynh, resulting in a single gunshot wound to the back. Huynh, who was in critical condition due to his injury, would eventually die in a hospital on December 7, 2008.

=== Dunkin' Donuts robbery cases ===
Apart from the two murders, Herard and his gang also committed three more robberies (all of which took place in three different Dunkin' Donuts stores), and unlike the fourth and final robbery that led to Huynh's murder, all the victims shot in this case survived.

On June 20, 2008, the group committed their first robbery at a Dunkin' Donuts restaurant at Plantation, Florida.

On November 24, 2008, the group committed their second robbery at another Dunkin' Donuts store Sunrise, Florida.

On November 26, 2008, the eve of Thanksgiving (also the eve of Kiem Huynh's murder), the third Dunkin' Donuts robbery took place in Delray Beach, Florida. In this case, at least four victims were shot in the face and left severely injured. One of them, 72-year-old retiree Paul Baretta, who was shot outside the store while inside his vehicle, became blind. Another victim, 72-year-old Gerald Lakin, had his jaw basted off his face due to a shot fired at his cheek.

== Trial for robbery and attempted murder charges ==
On January 7, 2009, James Herard and three of his fellow gang members, Calvin Weatherspoon, Tharod Bell and Charles Faustin, were charged with armed robbery for their crime spree. Jonathan Jackson, a high-ranking member of Herard's gang who did not participate in the robberies, was also charged as an accomplice.

On March 6, 2009, a Broward County grand jury indicted all the five suspects for multiple attempted murder and robbery charges.

On July 29, 2011, a jury found Herard guilty and convicted him of 19 counts, including attempted first-degree murder and robbery.

On August 26, 2011, Circuit Judge Karen Miller sentenced Herard to nine life sentences, five of which were ordered to run consecutively.

=== Conviction of Herard's other associates ===
On March 2, 2012, Charles Faustin was convicted of three counts of attempted first-degree murder, six counts of robbery with a firearm, five counts of aggravated assault with a firearm and five counts of possession of firearm while committing false imprisonment. Faustin was sentenced to nine consecutive life terms on April 12, 2012.

On June 15, 2012, both Tharod Bell and Calvin Weatherspoon officially stood trial at the same time before two separate juries for the robbery and attempted murder counts. Five days later, on June 20, 2012, Bell was found guilty of attempted murder and robbery on several counts, and he was sentenced to seven terms of life imprisonment. Weatherspoon was found guilty and sentenced to seven life sentences for attempted murder, robbery, aggravated battery and other charges on June 22, 2012.

On August 12, 2014, both Jonathan Jackson and Calvin Weatherspoon pleaded guilty to charges that included attempted murder, racketeering and robbery. Jackson was sentenced to 25 years in prison while Weatherspoon was given an additional 15 years' jail on top of his life sentences.

In the aftermath, Weatherspoon and Bell appealed against their convictions and sentences. Bell's first appeal to the Florida 4th District Court of Appeal was rejected on December 3, 2014. Three years later, the attempted murder convictions (as well as their life terms for those charges) of both Bell and Weatherspoon were overturned by the Florida Supreme Court in April 2017. However, the robbery convictions of the pair were upheld by the Florida 4th District Court of Appeal in May 2017, and they remained in prison serving their life sentences for those charges since then.

== Murder trials ==
Aside from the multiple counts of attempted murder, racketeering and robbery, James Herard and two of his associates, Tharod Bell and Charles Faustin, were charged with the murders of Kiem Huynh and Eric Jean-Pierre, and indicted by a grand jury on March 6, 2009. On November 19, 2013, the prosecution officially announced they would seek the death penalty for the trio.

However, only Herard stood trial for the first-degree murders of both Jean-Pierre and Huynh. In July 2014, Faustin pleaded guilty to two lesser counts of second-degree murder, and sentenced to 40 years' imprisonment. Bell, who was the shooter in Jean-Pierre's murder, also reached a plea agreement with the prosecution, and received a 50-year jail term for lesser charges pertaining to the homicides.

On April 29, 2014, Herard officially went on trial for the murders of Jean-Pierre and Huynh.

On May 16, 2014, Herard was found guilty of 18 out of 19 felony charges against him, including the murders of Kiem Huynh and Eric Jean-Pierre, racketeering and robbery, and was acquitted of one count of robbery (the 19th and final felony charge).

On June 4, 2014, the jury recommended the death penalty by a 8–4 majority vote in the death of Jean-Pierre, while for the death of Huynh, the same jury recommended life imprisonment without the possibility of parole.

During a hearing before he was to be formally sentenced, Herard defiantly dared the judge to sentence him to death, although he later stated that he should not be sentenced to death, claiming that he was innocent and the judge should not send him to death row. Herard's lawyers also argued that the death sentence could be potentially disproportionate given that Herard did not fire a single shot that killed Jean-Pierre while the shooter, Bell, was sentenced to a lighter sentence of 50 years in prison.

Originally, Herard was scheduled to be sentenced on October 20, 2014, but his formal sentencing was adjourned further to October 24, 2014. Once again, the sentencing hearing was postponed to December 5, 2014.

On January 23, 2015, Herard was sentenced to death for the murder of Jean-Pierre by Broward Circuit Judge Paul Backman. Herard was additionally sentenced to life without parole for the other charge of murdering Huynh.

== Death row and appeals ==
By February 2016, when the U.S. Supreme Court issued a landmark ruling in the 2016 case of Hurst v. Florida, pertaining to the constitutionality of Florida's death penalty laws, James Herard was named as one of the 43 inmates whose direct appeals were pending before the Florida Supreme Court.

On July 3, 2024, the Florida Supreme Court dismissed Herard's appeal and upheld his death sentence and murder conviction.

As of 2025, Herard remains incarcerated on death row at the Union Correctional Institution.

== See also ==
- Capital punishment in Florida
- List of death row inmates in the United States § Florida
