= Hildwin v. Florida =

- Supreme Court of the United States

Decided May 30, 1989
- Full case name: Paul C. Hildwin, petitioner v. Florida
- Docket no.: 88-6066
- Citations: 490 U.S. 638 (more) 109 S.Ct. 2055, 104 L.Ed.2d 728

Holding
- The Sixth Amendment does not require that the specific findings authorizing the imposition of the death sentence be made by a jury.

Court membership
- Chief Justice William Rehnquist Associate Justices William J. Brennan Jr. · Byron White; Thurgood Marshall · Harry Blackmun; John P. Stevens · Sandra Day O'Connor; Antonin Scalia · Anthony Kennedy

Case opinions
- Per curiam
- Dissent: Brennan
- Dissent: Marshall

Laws applied
- U.S. Const. amend. VI; Spaziano v. Florida (1984); McMillan v. Pennsylvania (1986)
- Overruled by
- Hurst v. Florida (2016)

Hildwin v. Florida, 490 U. S. 638 (1972), is a United States Supreme Court case which addresses the sixth amendment to the United States Constitution. It considers if imposition of the death penalty when no specific finding of aggravating factors was made by the jury. In a per curiam decision, the court ruled that there is no need for the jury to present specific findings when imposing the death penalty, as the judge is the one who decides the fact while the jury merely gives recommendations to the judge.

== Background ==
The petitioner, Paul Hildwin, was convicted of first-degree murder, a capital offense, by the jury. During the sentencing, with only one factor needed to sentence him to death, the judge found four aggravating factors and sentenced him to death. However, the jury did not provide any aggravating factor in their advisory of verdict.

The petitioner then appealed for the court to decide if the Florida capital sentencing scheme is in violation of the 6th amendment to the United States Constitution.

== Opinion of the Court ==
In a per curiam decision, the court upheld the Supreme Court of Florida's decision and held that there is no right under the sixth amendment to the United States Constitution that required there to be specific findings made by the jury to impose a death penalty.

=== Dissents ===
Both Justice Brennan and Marshall dissented and reiterated their view that the death penalty is cruel and unusual and pointed to their respective dissents in Gregg v. Georgia.

== Subsequent events ==
This case was overturned in 2016 in the Supreme Court ruling Hurst v. Florida.

The defendant, Paul Hildwin, was released from prison in 2020 after DNA testing exonerated him of the crime. As we read in an article from the Death Penalty Information Center, this DNA testing was requested for seven years but was not completed until 2010. When the Florida Supreme Court finally ordered a DNA database search, the DNA profile was identified to be the victim’s estranged boyfriend, an alternate suspect in the crime, who was convicted of 16 counts of sexual battery of a minor but set free and considered innocent back in 1986. Prior to his release, he spent 35 years in prison. These 35 years were spent behind bars for a crime that he did not commit. Not only was his reputation and career ruined but his family was broken. His daughter grew up without a father. His wife was a solo parent. As we read in an Innocence Project article, Hildwin even beat cancer and continued to serve the sentence for a crime in which he did not commit all while the real murderer ran loose for the next three decades.
