= Dallas v. Stanglin =

City of Dallas v. Stanglin
- Supreme Court of the United States

Argued March 1, 1989 Decided April 3, 1989
- Full case name: Dallas v. Stanglin
- Citations: 490 U.S. 19 (more) 109 S. Ct. 1591; 104 L. Ed. 2d 18

Case history
- Prior: Stanglin v. City of Dallas, 744 S.W.2d 165 (Tex. App. 1987), writ denied (Mar. 2, 1988); cert. granted, 488 U.S. 815 (1988)

Holding
- An ordinance imposing age limits on a teen dance hall does not infringe the First Amendment right of association.

Court membership
- Chief Justice William Rehnquist Associate Justices William J. Brennan Jr. · Byron White; Thurgood Marshall · Harry Blackmun; John P. Stevens · Sandra Day O'Connor; Antonin Scalia · Anthony Kennedy

Case opinions
- Majority: Rehnquist, joined by Brennan, White, Marshall, O'Connor, Scalia, and Kennedy
- Concurrence: Stevens (in judgment), joined by Blackmun

Laws applied
- U.S. Const. Amend. I

City of Dallas v. Stanglin, 490 U.S. 19 (1989), was a United States Supreme Court decision considering the First Amendment associational rights of teenagers at a dance hall. The Court upheld an ordinance imposing age limits on teen dance halls, ruling that gathering for recreational dancing is not an "expressive association" under the First Amendment.

== Background ==
In 1985, the City of Dallas passed an ordinance allowing licensed businesses to open dance halls for teenagers. The ordinance created a new category of dance halls ("Class E" dance halls) where only youths age 14 to 18 could dance. The Twilight Skating Rink, operated by Charles M. Stanglin, opened a Class E dance hall. Stanglin divided the floor of the skating rink into two sections: a dance floor for youths ages 14 to 18, and a roller skating rink open to all ages.

Stanglin wished to broaden the clientele of his dance floor by opening it to all ages. He brought a lawsuit against the City of Dallas claiming that the age restriction violated the association rights of minors under the First Amendment. The Texas Court of Appeals sided with Stanglin, striking down the age limit.

== Opinion of the Court ==
In a unanimous decision, the Supreme Court reversed the Texas Court of Appeals and upheld the age restrictions. Chief Justice William Rehnquist wrote the majority opinion.

The Court analyzed the case under the framework of Roberts v. United States Jaycees. In Jaycees, the Court had identified two types of associations that receive constitutional protection: "intimate associations" and "expressive associations." Stanglin argued that the dance hall patrons came together to form an expressive association.

The Court rejected this, writing that the dance hall patrons are "not members of any organized association"; indeed, "most are strangers to one another," and there is "no suggestion that these patrons take positions on public questions." In addition, the Court ruled that recreational dancing is not inherently expressive activity protected by the First Amendment. While gathering together to dance does contain a "kernel of expression," "such a kernel is not sufficient to bring the activity within the protection the First Amendment."

Because the Dallas ordinance impinges on "no constitutionally protected right," the only question is whether the age classification passes rational basis review under the Equal Protection Clause. The Court held that the City's interest in separating minors from the potential "corrupting influences" of "alcohol, illegal drugs, and promiscuous sex" justified imposing limits on dance-hall contacts between juveniles and adults.

Justice John Paul Stevens concurred. He would have evaluated the case under the framework of substantive due process rather than the First Amendment, writing, "the opportunity to make friends and enjoy the company of other people — in a dance hall or elsewhere — is an aspect of liberty protected by the Fourteenth Amendment." Nonetheless, Stevens agreed the ordinance was constitutional.

== See also ==
- List of United States Supreme Court cases
- List of United States Supreme Court cases, volume 490
