= List of United States Supreme Court cases, volume 458 =

This is a list of all the United States Supreme Court cases from volume 458 of the United States Reports:

Case name	Citation	Date decided
Toll v. Moreno	458 U.S. 1	1982
Northern Pipeline Construction Co. v. Marathon Pipe Line Co.	458 U.S. 50	1982
Union Labor Life Ins. Co. v. Pireno	458 U.S. 119	1982
Fidelity Fed. Sav. & Loan Ass'n v. de la Cuesta	458 U.S. 141	1982
Bd. of Educ. v. Rowley	458 U.S. 176	1982
Ford Motor Co. v. EEOC	458 U.S. 219	1982
Michigan v. Thomas	458 U.S. 259	1982
United States v. Hollywood Motor Car Co.	458 U.S. 263	1982
South Dakota v. Nebraska	458 U.S. 276	1982
Williams v. United States	458 U.S. 279	1982
ASARCO Inc. v. Idaho Tax Comm'n	458 U.S. 307	1982
Woolworth Co. v. Taxation & Revenue Dept.	458 U.S. 354	1982
Gen. Bldg. Contractors Ass'n, Inc. v. Pennsylvania	458 U.S. 375	1982
Loretto v. Teleprompter Manhattan CATV Corp.	458 U.S. 419	1982
Washington v. Seattle School Dist.	458 U.S. 457	1982
Lehman v. Lycoming Cnty. Children's Servs. Agency	458 U.S. 502	1982
Crawford v. Bd. of Educ.	458 U.S. 527	1982
Griffin v. Oceanic Contractors, Inc.	458 U.S. 564	1982
Velde v. Nat'l Black Police Ass'n, Inc.	458 U.S. 591	1982
Snapp & Son, Inc. v. Puerto Rico ex rel. Barez	458 U.S. 592	1982
Rogers v. Lodge	458 U.S. 613	1982
Rice v. Norman Williams Co.	458 U.S. 654	1982
Fla. Dept. of State v. Treasure Salvors, Inc.	458 U.S. 670	1982
Mississippi University for Women v. Hogan	458 U.S. 718	1982
New York v. Ferber	458 U.S. 747	1982
Enmund v. Florida	458 U.S. 782	1982
Ramah Navajo Sch. Bd., Inc. v. Bureau of Revenue	458 U.S. 832	1982
United States v. Valenzuela-Bernal	458 U.S. 858	1982
NAACP v. Claiborne Hardware Co.	458 U.S. 886	1982
Sporhase v. Nebraska ex rel. Douglas	458 U.S. 941	1982
Bd. of Educ. v. McCluskey	458 U.S. 966	1982
White v. Florida	458 U.S. 1301	1982
Beltran v. Smith	458 U.S. 1303	1982
Corsetti v. Massachusetts	458 U.S. 1306	1982
