= Sporhase v. Nebraska ex rel. Douglas =

- Supreme Court of the United States

Argued March 30, 1982 Decided July 2, 1982
- Full case name: Sporhase v. Nebraska ex rel. Douglas, Attorney General
- Citations: 458 U.S. 941 (more) 102 S. Ct. 3456; 73 L. Ed. 2d 1254; 1982 U.S. LEXIS 13

Holding
- The Nebraska statute forbidding commercial exportation of water from Nebraska was unconstitutional in that it violated the dormant commerce clause.

Court membership
- Chief Justice Warren E. Burger Associate Justices William J. Brennan Jr. · Byron White; Thurgood Marshall · Harry Blackmun; Lewis F. Powell Jr. · William Rehnquist; John P. Stevens · Sandra Day O'Connor

Case opinions
- Majority: Stevens, joined by Burger, Brennan, White, Marshall, Blackmun, Powell
- Dissent: Rehnquist, joined by O'Connor

Laws applied
- U.S. Const. Art. I § 8

Sporhase v. Nebraska ex rel. Douglas, 458 U.S. 941 (1982), was a case in which the United States Supreme Court decided that a Nebraska statute forbidding commercial exportation of water from Nebraska was unconstitutional in that it violated the dormant commerce clause.

The boundary between the states of Nebraska and Colorado passed through a farm owned by Sporhase. He drilled a well in Nebraska and used the water to irrigate his land on both sides of the boundary. Under the 11th Amendment, he could not sue the state of Nebraska in a federal district court; consequently his suit had to proceed in the state courts in Nebraska until he petitioned the United States Supreme Court to review it.

== See also ==
- List of United States Supreme Court cases, volume 458
