= Mead Corp. v. Tilley =

- Supreme Court of the United States

Argued February 22, 1989 Decided June 5, 1989
- Full case name: Mead Corp. v. Tilley
- Docket no.: 87-1868
- Citations: 490 U.S. 714 (more) 109 S. Ct. 2156; 104 L. Ed. 2d 796; 1989 U.S. LEXIS 2709

Case history
- Prior: Tilley v. Mead Corp., 815 F.2d 989 (4th Cir. 1987); cert. granted, 488 U.S. 815 (1988).
- Subsequent: Tilley v. Mead Corp., 927 F.2d 756 (4th Cir. 1991); cert. denied, 505 U.S. 1212 (1992).

Court membership
- Chief Justice William Rehnquist Associate Justices William J. Brennan Jr. · Byron White; Thurgood Marshall · Harry Blackmun; John P. Stevens · Sandra Day O'Connor; Antonin Scalia · Anthony Kennedy

Case opinions
- Majority: Marshall, joined by Rehnquist, Brennan, White, Blackmun, O'Connor, Scalia, Kennedy
- Dissent: Stevens

Laws applied
- Employee Retirement Income Security Act of 1974, 29 U.S.C. § 1001 et seq.

Mead Corp. v. Tilley, 490 U.S. 714 (1989), is a US labor law case, concerning occupational pensions under the Employee Retirement Income Security Act of 1974 (ERISA).

== Facts ==
Five employees of the Lynchburg Foundry Company (a subsidiary of The Mead Corporation) were paid a reduced retirement benefit when Mead sold the Foundry and terminated its Industrial Products Salaried Retirement Plan. The issue in the case was "whether . . . [ERISA] requires a plan administrator to pay plan participants unreduced early retirement benefits provided under the plan before residual assets may revert to an employer" when certain benefit plans are terminated.

== Judgment ==
Justice Thurgood Marshall, writing for the Court, held that only after an employer has met PBGC conditions to fund plans can it recoup "excess" funds that would not need to cover promised benefits. Citing the test in Chevron U.S.A., Inc. v. Natural Resources Defense Council, Inc., 467 U.S. 837 (1984), the Court held that the statute at issue "in no way indicate[d] an intent to confer a right upon plan participants to recover unaccrued benefits."

Justice John P. Stevens dissented.

In my opinion the early retirement benefits that respondents seek are contingent liabilities that under both ERISA and the Plan must be satisfied before plan assets revert to the employer. Section 4044(d) of ERISA provides that residual assets of a plan may revert to the employer only if three conditions are satisfied, including that "all liabilities of the plan to participants and their beneficiaries have been satisfied" and "the plan provides for such a distribution in these circumstances." 29 U.S.C. § 1344(d). Under the Plan, "[a]ny surplus remaining in the Retirement Fund, due to actuarial error, after the satisfaction of all benefit rights or contingent rights accrued under the Plan, . . . shall . . . be returnable to [Mead]." App. 63 (Plan, Art. XIII, § 4(f)).

== Subsequent developments ==
The case was remanded to the Fourth Circuit which held ("in harmony with Justice Stevens") that "the Plan's provisions compel satisfaction of the unreduced retirement benefits prior to reversion of the surplus assets."

== See also ==
- United States labor law
