= Lauro Lines v. Chasser =

Lauro Lines s.r.l. v. Chasser, et al.
- Supreme Court of the United States

Argued April 17, 1989 Decided May 22, 1989
- Full case name: Lauro Lines s.r.l. v. Chasser, et al.
- Citations: 490 U.S. 495 (more) 109 S. Ct. 1976; 104 L. Ed. 2d 548; 1989 U.S. LEXIS 2538; 57 U.S.L.W. 4543; 1989 AMC 1474

Case history
- Prior: Chasser v. Achille Lauro Lines, 844 F.2d 50 (2d Cir. 1988), cert. granted, 488 U.S. 887 (1988).

Holding
- The Court laid out the law of interlocutory appeals for United States federal courts.

Court membership
- Chief Justice William Rehnquist Associate Justices William J. Brennan Jr. · Byron White; Thurgood Marshall · Harry Blackmun; John P. Stevens · Sandra Day O'Connor; Antonin Scalia · Anthony Kennedy

Case opinions
- Majority: Brennan, joined by unanimous
- Concurrence: Scalia

Laws applied
- 28 U.S.C. § 1291

Lauro Lines s.r.l. v. Chasser, 490 U.S. 495 (1989), is the touchstone case in which the United States Supreme Court laid out the law of interlocutory appeals for United States federal courts.

== Facts ==
Plaintiff cruise passengers had filed a lawsuit in a United States district court against the defendant cruise line for injuries sustained when an Italian cruise ship, the Achille Lauro, was hijacked by terrorists. The cruise ticket included a forum selection clause which required that lawsuits against the cruise line be brought in Naples, Italy.

The cruise line filed a motion to dismiss for lack of personal jurisdiction, based on the forum selection clause. The district court denied the motion, and the cruise line sought an interlocutory appeal of this motion. The appellate court denied the motion based on the final judgment rule, 28 U.S.C. 1291, asserting that the cruise line would have to wait until the case was decided before filing any appeals. This ruling was immediately appealed to the U.S. Supreme Court, which granted certiorari.

== Issue ==
The Supreme Court was asked to decide whether a party can bring an interlocutory appeal against dismissal of a motion for lack of personal jurisdiction based on the existence of a forum selection clause.

== Opinion of the Court ==
The defendants argued that this fell under the judge-made collateral order doctrine, which allows immediate appeals of rulings that are collateral to the merits of the case, would determine it conclusively, and would not be effectively reviewable unless an immediate appeal were allowed. This doctrine was originally established in Cohen v. Beneficial Industrial Loan Corp., 337 U.S. 541 (1949).

The Court, in a unanimous opinion by Justice Brennan, held that the collateral order doctrine does not apply to a forum selection clause. This was not a case where the defendant was claiming a right not to be tried at all, like a sovereign immunity case, which would be disposed of before the defendant was even subject to the discovery process. Instead, the defendant was acknowledging that it could be sued, but merely disputing the appropriate forum for the suit.

Justice Scalia, concurring, wrote to express his opinion that the reason an interlocutory appeal would not stand in this case was that "the law does not deem the right important enough to be vindicated" by an interlocutory appeal.

== See also ==
- List of United States Supreme Court cases, volume 490
- List of United States Supreme Court cases
- Lists of United States Supreme Court cases by volume
- List of United States Supreme Court cases by the Rehnquist Court
