= ASARCO Inc. v. Idaho Tax Commission =

- Supreme Court of the United States

Decided June 29, 1982
- Full case name: ASARCO Inc. v. Idaho Tax Commission
- Citations: 458 U.S. 307 (more)

Holding
- In a state's calculation of income tax for a corporation from another state, the state cannot include income from the intangible assets of subsidiary corporations that have on connection with the state.

Court membership
- Chief Justice Warren E. Burger Associate Justices William J. Brennan Jr. · Byron White; Thurgood Marshall · Harry Blackmun; Lewis F. Powell Jr. · William Rehnquist; John P. Stevens · Sandra Day O'Connor

Case opinions
- Majority: Powell
- Concurrence: Burger
- Dissent: O'Connor, joined by Blackmun, Rehnquist

ASARCO Inc. v. Idaho Tax Commission, 458 U.S. 307 (1982), was a United States Supreme Court case in which the Court held that, in a state's calculation of income tax for a corporation from another state, the state cannot include income from the intangible assets of subsidiary corporations that have on connection with the state.

== See also ==
- Amerada Hess Corp. v. Division of Taxation
