= Interlocutory appeal =

Type of legal appeal in the U.S.

An interlocutory appeal (or interim appeal) occurs when a ruling by a trial court is appealed while other aspects of the case are still proceeding. The rules governing how and when interlocutory appeals may be taken vary by jurisdiction.

== United States ==
An appeal is described as interlocutory when it is made before all claims are resolved as to all parties. For instance, if a lawsuit contains claims for breach of contract, fraud and interference with contractual advantage, and if there are three defendants in this lawsuit, then until all three claims are resolved as to all three defendants, any appeal by any party will be considered interlocutory. The American courts disfavor such appeals, requiring parties to wait until all the claims as to all parties are resolved before any appeal can be brought to challenge any of the decisions made by the judge during the life of the case. "Although the general rule requires finality in order for a matter to be appealable, there are exceptions arising principally from court rules that permit appeal of interlocutory matters under specific circumstances." The procedural posture of interlocutory appeals have previously been criticized for allowing courts to grant "'hasty decision[s]'” on the basis of “'rudimentary hearings.'"

Interlocutory appeals may be brought, however, if waiting to bring an appeal would be particularly prejudicial to the rights of one of the parties. The trial judge can "certify" one of his orders for immediate interlocutory appeal. Suppose all the claims and issues have been resolved as to one of the defendants, but the rest of the parties will be fighting out the case for another year or ten. The trial judge could "certify" (i.e., signal his agreement) to allow the part of the case that has been concluded at trial level to be appealed.

=== Federal courts ===
The Supreme Court of the United States delineated the test for the availability of interlocutory appeals, called the collateral order doctrine, for United States federal courts in the case of Lauro Lines s.r.l. v. Chasser, holding that under the relevant statute (28 U.S.C. § 1291) such an appeal would be permitted only if:

1. the matter appealed was conclusive on the issue presented;
2. the matter appealed was collateral to the merits; and
3. the matter appealed would be effectively unreviewable if immediate appeal were not allowed.

The Supreme Court created the test in the case Cohen v. Beneficial Industrial Loan Corp., where it was applied to a requirement of bond to be posted in certain stockholders derivative actions by plaintiffs, in anticipation of being liable for defendant's attorney's fees. Since the substantial deterrent effect of the statute would be meaningless if not enforceable at the outset of litigation, but did not touch on the merits of plaintiff's claim, the Court allowed interlocutory appeal from the trial court's decision. The doctrine was restricted in Digital Equipment Corp. v. Desktop Direct Inc., which added an explicit importance criterion to the test for interlocutory appeals, holding that relief on a claim of immunity from suit because of a previous settlement agreement could not come through interlocutory appeal. The Supreme Court stated that the only matters of sufficient importance to merit a collateral appeal were "those originating in the Constitution or statutes".

Several U.S. statutes directly confer the right to interlocutory appeals, including appeals from orders denying arbitration, and some judicial actions against the debtor upon filing bankruptcy proceedings. There was a major split in the United States courts of appeals as to whether a stay of proceedings should issue in the district court while interlocutory appeals on the arbitrability of disputes are decided. An interlocutory appeal under the collateral order doctrine usually merits a stay of proceedings while the appeal is being decided. Previously, the Second and Ninth Circuits have refused to stay proceedings in the district court while an arbitration issue is pending. The Seventh, Tenth and Eleventh Circuit courts conversely held that a non-frivolous appeal warrants a stay of proceedings. However, in Coinbase, Inc. v. Bielski, 599 U.S. 736 (2023), the Supreme Court resolved the issue, holding that, upon an interlocutory appeal from the denial of a motion to compel arbitration, the District Court was required to stay its proceedings.

=== State courts ===
In California, interlocutory appeals are usually sought by filing a petition for writ of mandate with the Court of Appeal. If granted, the writ directs the appropriate superior court to vacate a particular order. Writs of mandate are a discretionary remedy; over 90% of such petitions are denied due to the state's public policy of encouraging efficient litigation of civil actions on the merits in the superior courts.

In New Jersey, "[t]he discretionary jurisdiction of the Appellate Division over appeals taken from interlocutory decisions of lower courts and of state administrative officers and agencies exists as a result of the combination of constitutional provisions and court rules." "The standard set out in the Rules of Court for determining whether to grant leave to appeal an interlocutory decision is, simply, that 'the Appellate Division may grant leave to appeal, in the interest of justice.'"

In New York, various interlocutory appeals can be found under the Civil Practice Law and Rules section 5701. This section, along with a writ of mandamus, are the only exceptions to filing an appeal only after the final judgment has been given.

In North Carolina, the trial court judge may certify an interlocutory order for an appeal. Notably, such certification is not binding on the North Carolina Court of Appeals, meaning that the North Carolina Court of appeals is free to refuse to review an interlocutory appeal even though the trial court had certified it. On the other hand, even when the trial court does not certify on order for immediate appeal, the North Carolina Court of Appeals may grant a writ of certiorari to review an interlocutory appeal on the basis of the so-called "substantial right." Whether the North Carolina Court of Appeals concludes that a substantial right is affected and decides to grant of a writ is not always easily predictable. The North Carolina has adopted a two-part test for the appropriateness of an appeal of an interlocutory order: Whether a substantial right is affected by the challenged order and whether this substantial right might be lost, prejudiced, or inadequately preserved in the absence of an immediate appeal. As the North Carolina Court of Appeals itself said on many occasions, "the substantial right test is more easily stated than applied." Some rights that the North Carolina Court of Appeals has recently found to be substantial are: the right to conduct business and get paid. A notable exception to the rule that all orders are interlocutory until the final issue is resolved is the issue of unresolved attorney's fees. In 2013, the Supreme Court of North Carolina clarified that all appeals can and must be taken from the trial courts' orders even if the attorney's fees were still unresolved. In 2013 the North Carolina lawmaking body substantially liberalized the appeals from the decisions of North Carolina family law courts (i.e., the divorce courts, applying N.C. Gen. Stat. §50). Until 2013, the litigants had to wait until the trial court resolved all divorce related issues until they could appeal any of the trial court's orders. For instance, an order resolving alimony could not be appealed until the court also resolved child support, division of property, and child custody. The new law N.C. Gen. Stat. 50-19.1 allows divorcing spouses to appeal each of these unrelated orders as soon as they are entered.

In Louisiana, parties to both civil and criminal cases may apply for supervisory writs in one of the state's five geographic Circuit Courts of Appeal, seeking to review a ruling or order of the district court. As the name implies, the Court of Appeal's power to consider a writ application stems from its supervisory jurisdiction over the district courts. Such jurisdiction is discretionary, and thus the appellate court may issue an action granting or denying the writ, or may decline to consider the merits of an application altogether. In practice, taking writs is far more common in criminal matters and most often involves objections to a district court's pre-trial rulings on defense motions to suppress evidence, statements, or identifications. An application for supervisory writs is also the mechanism for seeking review of a district court's decision to grant or deny a petition for post-conviction relief. A party aggrieved by the Court of Appeal's ruling on a supervisory writ may then apply for supervisory writs in the Louisiana Supreme Court.

== Canada ==
In Canada, there is no right of interlocutory appeal in criminal matters. Rulings made in the course of a criminal trial can only be challenged on appeal after the case is finally decided. However, when a trial is held in provincial court, rulings during the trial may be challenged for jurisdictional error (when the court is alleged not just to have made a wrong decision, but to have made a decision it had no authority to make), or in a few other rare circumstances, by way of certiorari.
