= Rogers v. Lodge =

- Supreme Court of the United States

Argued February 23, 1982 Decided July 1, 1982
- Full case name: Rogers, et al. v. Lodge, et al.
- Citations: 458 U.S. 613 (more) 102 S. Ct. 3272; 73 L. Ed. 2d 1012; 1982 U.S. LEXIS 155; 50 U.S.L.W. 5041

Holding
- The Court of Appeals did not err in concluding that the District Court applied the proper legal standard where it appears that the District Court demonstrated its understanding of the controlling standard by observing that a determination of discriminatory intent was "a requisite to a finding of unconstitutional vote dilution" under the Fourteenth and Fifteenth Amendments.

Court membership
- Chief Justice Warren E. Burger Associate Justices William J. Brennan Jr. · Byron White; Thurgood Marshall · Harry Blackmun; Lewis F. Powell Jr. · William Rehnquist; John P. Stevens · Sandra Day O'Connor

Case opinions
- Majority: White, joined by Burger, Brennan, Marshall, Blackmun, O'Connor
- Dissent: Powell, joined by Rehnquist
- Dissent: Stevens

Laws applied
- U.S. Const. amends. XIV, XV

Rogers v. Lodge, 458 U.S. 613 (1982), was a United States Supreme Court case in which the Court held that an at-large election system for a large rural county with a large black population violated the Equal Protection Clause.

== Background ==
Burke County, Ga., a large, predominantly rural county, had an at-large system for electing members of its governing Board of Commissioners. No black person had ever been elected to the Board. Eight black citizens of Burke County, Georgia, brought a class action in the United States District Court for the Southern District of Georgia, alleging that the county's system of at-large election of the five county commissioners violated the constitutional and statutory rights of the county's black citizens (inter alia, plaintiffs' Fourteenth and Fifteenth Amendment rights) by diluting their voting power.

=== Procedural history ===
==== District court ====
The District Court found that the at-large system was being maintained for discriminatory purposes, and it ordered that the county be divided into five districts for the purpose of electing county commissioners.

Finding that blacks have always made up a substantial majority of the county's population but that they are a minority of the registered voters, that there had been bloc voting along racial lines, and that past discrimination had restricted the present opportunity of blacks to participate effectively in the political process, the District Court held that although the state policy behind the at-large electoral system was "neutral in origin," the policy was being maintained for invidious purposes in violation of plaintiffs' Fourteenth and Fifteenth Amendment rights.

The court then ordered the county to be divided into districts for purposes of electing County Commissioners.

==== Fifth Circuit ====
The Court of Appeals affirmed, holding that the District Court properly required appellees to prove that the at-large system was maintained for a discriminatory purpose, that the District Court's findings were not clearly erroneous, and that its conclusion that the at-large system was maintained for invidious purposes was "virtually mandated by the overwhelming proof."

Burke County then appealed to the Supreme Court, which granted certiorari; the Court heard oral arguments on February 23, 1982.

== Opinion of the Court ==
Justice White wrote the opinion of the Court.

The Court affirmed and held that the system of elections violated the African-American citizens' Fourteenth Amendment rights because it diluted their voting power and that the system was maintained for invidious purposes. The Court affirmed the decision of the lower court, which determined that the county's at-large system of elections violated the constitutional rights of its African-American citizens. The Court held that the system of elections diluted appellees' voting power and excluded them from the election process.

The Court held that the lower court's determination was not clearly erroneous. The Court held that there was sufficient evidence to support a finding that the African-American citizens had been invidiously excluded from the political process by the county's system of elections. The Court found that the sheer geographic size of the county made it difficult for the African-American citizens to get to polling places or to campaign for office. The Court held that the elections system submerged the will of the African-American citizens and thus denied their access to the system. The Court found that the requirement that candidates run for specific seats enhanced the African-American citizens' lack of access because it prevented a cohesive political group from concentrating on a single candidate.

Held:

1. The Court of Appeals did not err in concluding that the District Court applied the proper legal standard, where it appears that the District Court demonstrated its understanding of the controlling standard by observing that a determination of discriminatory intent was "a requisite to a finding of unconstitutional vote dilution" under the Fourteenth and Fifteenth Amendments. 458 U.S. 613, 616 (1982)

2. Where neither the District Court's ultimate findings of intentional discrimination nor its subsidiary findings of fact appear to be clearly erroneous and such findings were agreed to by the Court of Appeals, this Court will not disturb the findings. 458 U.S. 613, 622 (1982)

3. Nor is there any reason to overturn the relief ordered by the District Court, where neither that court nor the Court of Appeals discerned any special circumstances that would militate against utilizing single-member districts. 458 U.S. 613, 627 (1982)

=== Dissenting opinions ===
Justice Powell, joined by Justice Rehnquist, dissented on the ground that discriminatory intent must be proved primarily by objective evidence.

Justice Stevens dissented on the ground that subjective intent is not a valid criterion for constitutional adjudication.
