= Amerada Hess Corp. v. Division of Taxation =

- Supreme Court of the United States

Decided April 3, 1989
- Full case name: Amerada Hess Corp. v. Division of Taxation
- Citations: 490 U.S. 66 (more)

Holding
- When determining how much business a corporation has done in a state for tax purposes, the Dormant Commerce Clause requires only that the formula be rational.

Court membership
- Chief Justice William Rehnquist Associate Justices William J. Brennan Jr. · Byron White; Thurgood Marshall · Harry Blackmun; John P. Stevens · Sandra Day O'Connor; Antonin Scalia · Anthony Kennedy

Case opinions
- Majority: Blackmun
- Concurrence: Scalia
- O'Connor took no part in the consideration or decision of the case.

Laws applied
- Dormant Commerce Clause

Amerada Hess Corp. v. Division of Taxation, 490 U.S. 66 (1989), was a United States Supreme Court case in which the Court held that, when determining how much business a corporation has done in a state for tax purposes, the Dormant Commerce Clause requires only that the formula be rational.

== See also ==
- ASARCO Inc. v. Idaho Tax Comm'n
