= Martin v. Wilks =

- Supreme Court of the United States

Argued January 18, 1989 Decided June 12, 1989
- Full case name: Martin, et al. v. Robert K. Wilks, et al.
- Citations: 490 U.S. 755 (more) 109 S. Ct. 2180; 104 L. Ed. 2d 835; 1989 U.S. LEXIS 2849

Case history
- Prior: In re Birmingham Reverse Discrimination Emp't Litig., 833 F.2d 1492 (11th Cir. 1987); cert. granted, 487 U.S. 1204 (1988).

Holding
- Respondents are not precluded from challenging the employment decisions taken pursuant to the consent decrees.

Court membership
- Chief Justice William Rehnquist Associate Justices William J. Brennan Jr. · Byron White; Thurgood Marshall · Harry Blackmun; John P. Stevens · Sandra Day O'Connor; Antonin Scalia · Anthony Kennedy

Case opinions
- Majority: Rehnquist, joined by White, O'Connor, Scalia, Kennedy
- Dissent: Stevens, joined by Brennan, Marshall, Blackmun

Martin v. Wilks, 490 U.S. 755 (1989), was a U.S. Supreme Court case brought by Robert K. Wilks challenging the validity of race-based hiring practices.

== Background ==
In 1974, the Jefferson County, Alabama Personnel Board signed a consent decree that required them to hire and promote African-American firefighters. Wilks, a white fireman, took issue with the agreement, claiming that he and other white firefighters (who were not parties to the original consent decrees signed in 1974) were more qualified than some of the black firefighters receiving promotions. The Supreme Court of the United States upheld the appeal of the white firefighters in a 5–4 decision on the issue of whether the white firefighters have a constitutional right to challenge the previously established decrees.

== Opinion of the Court ==
Chief Justice William Rehnquist wrote for the majority. They reasoned that a person cannot be denied his rights in a proceeding to which he was not a party. Since the white firefighters did not have valid notice of the original proceeding, they should have their appeal sustained and the decrees overturned.

Justice John Paul Stevens wrote the dissent, and he was joined by Justice William Brennan, Justice Thurgood Marshall, and Justice Harry Blackmun. The dissent reasoned that the white firefighters should have had only limited means to appeal given that they were challenging the validity of the consent decrees but were not original parties to the consent decrees and that the majority overstepped the authority of the court.

Despite the racial overtones of the case and the sensitive public issues of civil rights and affirmative action, the core dispute of the case is one regarding proper procedure. The Court declared that the white firefighters should have been joined as parties to the original proceeding under the Federal Rules of Civil Procedure Rule 19(a).

== See also ==
- List of United States Supreme Court cases, volume 490
- List of United States Supreme Court cases
- Lists of United States Supreme Court cases by volume
- List of United States Supreme Court cases by the Rehnquist Court
- Hansberry v. Lee, 311 U.S. 32 (1940)
