= Spaziano v. Florida =

- Supreme Court of the United States

Argued April 17, 1984 Decided July 2, 1984
- Full case name: Joseph Robert Spaziano v. Florida
- Citations: 468 U.S. 447 (more) 104 S. Ct. 3154; 82 L. Ed. 2d 340; 1984 U.S. LEXIS 141

Case history
- Prior: Spaziano v. State, 393 So. 2d 1119 (Fla. 1981); Spaziano v. Florida, 454 U.S. 1037 (1981); on remand, Spaziano v. State, 433 So. 2d 508 (1983)

Holding
- It was not error for the trial judge to refuse to instruct the jury on lesser included offenses.

Court membership
- Chief Justice Warren E. Burger Associate Justices William J. Brennan Jr. · Byron White; Thurgood Marshall · Harry Blackmun; Lewis F. Powell Jr. · William Rehnquist; John P. Stevens · Sandra Day O'Connor

Case opinions
- Majority: Blackmun, joined by Burger, Powell, O'Connor; White, Rehnquist (all but a portion of Part II); Brennan, Marshall, Stevens (Part II only)
- Concurrence: White, joined by Rehnquist
- Concur/dissent: Stevens, joined by Brennan, Marshall

Laws applied
- U.S. Const. amends. VI, VIII
- Overruled by
- Hurst v. Florida (2016)

Spaziano v. Florida was two United States Supreme Court cases dealing with the imposition of the death penalty. In the first case, 454 U.S. 1037 (1981), the Supreme Court, with two dissents, refused Spaziano's petition for certiorari. However, the Florida Supreme Court would reverse Spaziano's death sentence based on the judge's receipt of a confidential report which was not received by either party. On remand, the judge reimposed the death penalty and the Florida Supreme Court upheld the sentence. In the second case, 468 U.S. 447 (1984), the Court heard Spaziano's appeal of his death sentence.

== Facts ==
Spaziano was tried for first-degree murder, but the court refused to offer lesser non-capital offenses as the statute of limitations had expired on them when Spaziano refused to waive the statute of limitations. The jury convicted Spaziano and recommended a sentence of life imprisonment. Florida law makes the jury's recommendation merely that, a recommendation, and requires the judge to examine the aggravating and mitigating factors and thus gives the judge the power to override the jury and impose the death penalty.

== Issues ==
1. Was the judge in error for not advising the jury that it could consider lesser non-capital offenses? 2. Is a jury's determination not to impose capital punishment final? 3. If a judge is imposing a death sentence after a jury imposition of life imprisonment, does this violate the double-jeopardy clause? 4. Is a judge imposition of death over-riding a jury decision of life imprisonment violating the constitutional requirement for reliability of capital sentencing?

== Result ==
Since the non-capital offenses were not lesser-included offenses of the crime to which Spaziano was charged, it was not error for the court to refuse to offer them to the jury (in the absence of Spaziano waiving the statute of limitations). Florida law giving the trial court the power to over-ride a jury recommendation of life and impose the death penalty is not unconstitutional, in that there is nothing irrational or arbitrary about this method.

Spaziano's death sentence was upheld.

== Dissents ==
White and Rehnquist concurred in general, and dissented in part on the majority holding that a state must allow the defendant to waive the statute of limitations where there is the possibility of a lesser charge.

Stevens, Brennan and Marshall concurred in the majority opinion and dissented in part, holding that they felt that imposition of the death penalty against the wishes of the jury violates the Eighth Amendment to the United States Constitution.

== Other ==
The Spaziano ruling was vitiated by the U.S. Supreme Court ruling in another death penalty case, Hurst v. Florida (2016).

== See also ==
- List of United States Supreme Court cases, volume 454
- List of United States Supreme Court cases, volume 468
