= Hurst v. Florida =

- Supreme Court of the United States

Argued October 13, 2015 Decided January 12, 2016
- Full case name: Timothy Lee Hurst, Petitioner v. Florida
- Docket no.: 14-7505
- Citations: 577 U.S. 92 (more) 136 S. Ct. 616; 193 L. Ed. 2d 504
- Opinion announcement: Opinion announcement

Case history
- Prior: Hurst v. State, 147 So. 3d 435 (Fla. 2014); cert. granted, 135 S. Ct. 1531 (2015).

Holding
- Florida's capital sentencing scheme violates the Sixth Amendment in light of Ring v. Arizona.

Court membership
- Chief Justice John Roberts Associate Justices Antonin Scalia · Anthony Kennedy; Clarence Thomas · Ruth Bader Ginsburg; Stephen Breyer · Samuel Alito; Sonia Sotomayor · Elena Kagan

Case opinions
- Majority: Sotomayor, joined by Roberts, Scalia, Kennedy, Thomas, Ginsburg, Kagan
- Concurrence: Breyer (in judgment)
- Dissent: Alito

Laws applied
- U.S. Const. amend. VI
- This case overturned a previous ruling or rulings
- Spaziano v. Florida (1984), Hildwin v. Florida (1989)

Hurst v. Florida, 577 U.S. 92 (2016), was a United States Supreme Court case in which the Court, in an 8–1 ruling, applied the rule of Ring v. Arizona to the Florida capital sentencing scheme, holding that the Sixth Amendment requires a jury to find the aggravating factors necessary for imposing the death penalty. In Florida, under a 2013 statute, the jury made recommendations but the judge decided the facts.

== Background ==
Timothy Hurst was charged with killing Cynthia Harrison, a co-worker at Popeyes Chicken. The 1998 murder was part of a botched robbery at the Escambia County restaurant. Under Florida law, the maximum sentence a capital felon may receive on the basis of a conviction alone is life imprisonment. He may be sentenced to death only if an additional sentencing proceeding "results in findings by the court that such person shall be punished by death" (Fla. Stat. §775.082(1)). In that proceeding, the sentencing judge first conducts an evidentiary hearing before a jury (§921.141(1)). Next, the jury, by majority vote, renders an "advisory sentence" (§921.141(2)). The court must still independently find and weigh the aggravating and mitigating circumstances before entering a sentence of life or death (§921.141(3)). This procedure was adopted from 2013 when Governor Rick Scott signed the Timely Justice Act (HB 7101) which overhauled the processes for capital punishment.

A Florida jury convicted petitioner Hurst of first-degree murder. The jury recommended the death penalty, and the court sentenced Hurst to death, but he was granted a new sentencing hearing on appeal. At resentencing, the jury again recommended death, and the judge again found the facts necessary to sentence Hurst to death. The Florida Supreme Court affirmed, rejecting Hurst's argument that his sentence violated the Sixth Amendment in light of Ring v. Arizona 536 U. S. 584, in which case the Court found unconstitutional an Arizona capital sentencing policy permitting a judge, rather than the jury, to find the facts necessary to sentence a defendant to death.

== Opinion ==
Justice Sonia Sotomayor wrote the majority opinion of the Court. Florida's capital sentencing scheme, requiring that a judge instead of a jury to make the critical findings necessary to impose the death penalty, violated the Sixth Amendment in light of Ring v. Arizona. The Court also rejected Florida's counterarguments. First, Florida argued that the jury's recommendation necessarily included an aggravating circumstance finding but still violated Ring because the jury's function was still advisory only. Second, Florida's reliance on Blakely v. Washington is misplaced: Florida alleges that Hurst's counsel allegedly admitted the existence of a robbery, but Blakely applied Apprendi v. New Jersey to facts admitted in a guilty plea, in which the defendant necessarily waived his right to a jury trial, but Florida had not explained how Hurst's alleged admissions accomplished a similar waiver. In any event, Hurst never admitted to either aggravating circumstance alleged. Third, although the Court had repeatedly upheld Florida's capital sentencing scheme in the past (such as Hildwin v. Florida and Spaziano v. Florida), it did not mean that stare decisis compelled the Court to do so again. Instead, time and subsequent cases had "washed away" the logic of Spaziano and Hildwin. Finally, the Court normally leaves it to state courts to consider whether an error is harmless.

Justice Stephen Breyer wrote a concurring opinion stating that he cannot join the majority's opinion because of the reasons he explained in his concurring opinion in Ring. (Since he did not fully agree with the majority opinion in Ring, he could not support the majority's rationale here in Hurst.) However, he agreed with striking Florida's scheme, referring back to Justice John Paul Stevens' concurring opinion in Spaziano, among others, that he believes that any imposition of the death penalty by a single government official instead of a jury violates the Eighth Amendment.

Justice Samuel Alito dissented. He disagreed with the majority on basically overruling Hildwin and Spaziano. Instead, he would have preferred for the Court to reconsider Ring directly. He also wrote that Arizona's sentencing scheme is very different from Florida's because under the former, a jury plays no role in the process. However, in Florida, "the jury plays a critically important role. Our decision in Ring did not decide whether this procedure violates the Sixth Amendment, and I would not extend Ring to cover the Florida system."

== Aftermath ==
At the time of the decision, Florida had about 400 inmates on death row, the most of any state except California. It was unclear how many might receive new re-sentencing hearings as a result of this decision. In late January 2016, about 40 inmates had appeals pending.

The Florida legislature passed a new statute to comply with the judgement in March 2016, changing the sentencing method to require a 10-juror supermajority for a sentence of death with a life sentence as the alternative.

This new sentencing scheme was struck down by the Florida Supreme Court in a 5–2 ruling in October 2016. The court held that a death sentence must be issued by a unanimous jury. The court ruled that the law "cannot be applied to pending prosecutions" which means that until the Florida legislature acts, there is no procedure or law allowing a prosecutor to seek the death penalty; it leaves open, however, as in the aftermath of the Hurst ruling, the status of sentences passed under the now twice-struck-down provisions. Nevertheless, the court granted Hurst a new sentencing hearing following the U.S. Supreme Court ruling. On March 5, 2020, Hurst was resentenced to life imprisonment without parole.

The U.S. Supreme Court had received at least 83 petitions from inmates on death row in Florida who believed that their cases had been decided incorrectly based on Hurst, in that the jury had unanimously recommended the death sentence while the judge had made the actual decision. These petitions followed the Florida Supreme Court's refusal to re-hear these cases on the basis that in all cases there was no reasonable doubt that the juries would have decided on the death sentence. In November 2018, the United States Supreme Court denied all these petitions, ruling broadly that the Hurst decision only affected those sentences which were applied post-2002 (following the court's decision in Ring v. Arizona) and that only those sentences were eligible for the Hurst clarification.

== See also ==
- Ring v. Arizona
- Capital punishment in Florida
- Capital punishment in the United States
- List of death row inmates in the United States
