= Sharon McGowan =

American lawyer

- Occupation: Lawyer

Sharon McGowan is an American lawyer and a partner at Katz Banks Kumin LLP, an employment and whistleblower firm based in Washington, D.C. Prior to joining KBK, she was the legal director and chief strategy officer for Lambda Legal. McGowan was an Obama administration appointee in the role of Acting General Counsel and Deputy General Counsel for Policy at the U.S. Office of Personnel Management. She also served as Principal Deputy Chief of the Appellate Section of the Civil Rights Division in the Department of Justice. In 2019, she was honored with the Stonewall Award, bestowed by the American Bar Association's Commission on Sexual Orientation and Gender Identity.

== Early life and education ==
McGowan was raised in Queens. Her father was an NYPD lieutenant and commanding officer of the hostage negotiation team. Her mother was a secretary at St. Kevin's Roman Catholic Church. McGowan entered storytelling contests as an adolescent and as a teen, partook in her high school forensics club. She came out as gay to her parents in the late '90s.

While earning her undergraduate degree at the University of Virginia, McGowan acted as a help desk clerk to GLAD attorneys. She graduated from the university with honors in 1995, after which she attended Harvard Law School, graduating with honors in 2000.

== Career ==
Early on in her career, McGowan served as a law clerk to the Honorable Norman H. Stahl, U.S. Court of Appeals for the First Circuit, and as a law clerk to the Honorable Helen Ginger Berrigan, U.S. District Court for the Eastern District of Louisiana. McGowan was also an associate at Jenner & Block, Washington, D.C., where she was a member of litigation team in Lawrence v. Texas, which resulted in the U.S. Supreme Court striking down sodomy laws as unconstitutional.

Early on in her career, McGowan served as Staff Attorney with the ACLU's Lesbian Gay Bisexual Transgender & AIDS Project, where she served as lead attorney in a landmark Title VII case, Schroer v. Billington, which established new protections for transgender individuals against employment discrimination based on their gender identity and gender transition.

During the Obama administration, Ms. McGown held several senior positions. She was the Principal Deputy Chief of the Appellate Section of the U.S. Department of Justice’s Civil Rights Division, where she supervised attorneys and advised the U.S. Solicitor General and federal agencies on a broad range of civil rights issues related to the enforcement of federal laws prohibiting discrimination in employment, housing, education, credit, voting, and policing in the U.S. Supreme Court and lower federal courts. Ms. McGowan also served as Acting General Counsel and Deputy General Counsel for Policy at the U.S. Office of Personnel Management, where she led the implementation of key administration priorities including nationwide marriage equality and the Affordable Care Act.

McGowan was hired to serve as Director of Strategy for Lambda Legal in February 2017, establishing their offices in Washington, D.C. In 2018, she became in the organization’s Legal Director and Chief Strategy Officer, overseeing a team of over thirty lawyers and paraprofessionals and working on key LGBTQ civil rights cases like Bostock v. Clayton County.

In 2022, Ms. McGowan announced that she would be joining Katz Banks Kumin LLP as a partner, working alongside other high-profile civil rights attorneys such as Debra Katz. In 2023, she announced that she was representing Terry Horton, a Black property-owner in Cincinnati who encountered discriminatory treatment while attempting to refinance his home. Ms. McGowan filed a complaint with the U.S. Department of Housing and Urban Development on behalf of Mr. Horton and the National Community Reinvestment Coalition. The case was later reported on by The New York Times and NPR.

== Noteworthy publications and appearances ==
McGowan received the 2011 Dukeminier Award from the Williams Institute of the UCLA School of Law for outstanding legal scholarship for her article, Working with Clients to Develop Compatible Visions of What It Means to “Win” a Case: Reflections on Schroer v. Billington, 45 HARV. CIV. R.- CIV. L. L. REV. 205 (2010).

Ms. McGowan is a co-author of the 4th edition of the American Civil Liberties Union publication, The Rights of Lesbians, Gay Men, Bisexuals and Transgender People (2004), along with Nan Hunter and Courtney Joslin.

In September 2019, McGowan and Vanita Gupta co-authored an article for a SCOTUSblog symposium about Bostock v. Clayton County in support of the argument that Title VII’s prohibition on sex discrimination encompasses discrimination on the basis of sexual orientation and gender identity.

On July 20, 2021, McGowan testified before the Presidential Commission on Supreme Court Reform. On September 24, 2020, McGowan testified before the U.S. House of Representatives Committee on the Judiciary’s Subcommittee on the Constitution, Civil Rights, and Civil Liberties, regarding oversight of the Civil Rights Division of the U.S. Department of Justice.

McGowan has been a regular participant in LGBTQ legal conferences across the country. In August 2019, McGowan presented at The 2020 Lavender Law® Conference and Career Fair, leading workshops such as "A Comprehensive Look at Transgender Equality in the Workplace," "A Lifetime of Power: How the Trump Administration is Overhauling the Judiciary with Anti-LGBT Judges," and "Title IX and the Future of Protection for Students."

== Awards and honors ==
- Stonewall Award (2019)

== Personal life ==
McGowan married in 2010. She and her wife, Emily, a former Biden Foundation LGBTQ advisor and former Chief Policy Officer for the Family Equality Council, have two daughters.

== In media ==
=== Podcasts ===
Date	Series	Episode
Sept. 20, 2019	Out in Left Field with Dana Goldberg	"Sharon McGowan Goes Out in Left Field"
Feb. 2, 2019	Amicus with Dahlia Lithwick, a Slate podcast	"What Did We Learn From The Trans Ban Injunction Decision?"

=== Other ===
Year	Outlet	Title
April 19, 2019	Human Rights Campaign	"Lambda Legal Supports the Equality Act"
March 21, 2019	Human Rights Campaign	"Unprecedented Support for the Equality Act"
June 27, 2018	89.0 KBBI	"LGBTQ Rights Group Reflects On Justice Anthony Kennedy's Retirement"
June 4, 2018	90.9 WBUR	"Supreme Court Rules In Favor Of Colorado Baker In Cakeshop Case"
Oct 22, 2018	PBS NewsHour	"HHS reportedly considering a limited definition of gender. Is it legal?"
