= List of United States Supreme Court cases, volume 490 =

1989 cases

This is a list of all the United States Supreme Court cases from volume 490 of the United States Reports:

Case name	Citation	Date decided
United States v. Sokolow	490 U.S. 1	1989
Dallas v. Stanglin	490 U.S. 19	1989
Choctaw Indians v. Holyfield	490 U.S. 30	1989
Amerada Hess Corp. v. Division of Taxation	490 U.S. 66	1989
FSLIC v. Ticktin	490 U.S. 82	1989
Wrenn v. Benson	490 U.S. 89	1989
California v. ARC Am. Corp.	490 U.S. 93	1989
Massachusetts v. Morash	490 U.S. 107	1989
Chan v. Korean Air Lines, Ltd.	490 U.S. 122	1989
Am. Foreign Service Ass'n v. Garfinkel	490 U.S. 153	1989
Cotton Petroleum Corp. v. New Mexico	490 U.S. 163	1989
Skinner v. Mid-America Pipeline Co.	490 U.S. 212	1989
Frank v. Minn. Newspaper Ass'n, Inc.	490 U.S. 225	1989
Price Waterhouse v. Hopkins	490 U.S. 228	1989
Mallard v. S.D. Iowa	490 U.S. 296	1989
Neitzke v. Williams	490 U.S. 319	1989
Robertson v. Citizens Council	490 U.S. 332	1989
Marsh v. Nat. Resources Council	490 U.S. 360	1989
Graham v. Connor	490 U.S. 386	1989
Thornburgh v. Abbott	490 U.S. 401	1989
United States v. Halper	490 U.S. 435	1989
Dept. of Corrections v. Thompson	490 U.S. 454	1989
Rodriguez de Quijas v. Shearson/American Express Inc.	490 U.S. 477	1989
Maleng v. Cook	490 U.S. 488	1989
Lauro Lines s.r.l. v. Chasser	490 U.S. 495	1989
Green v. Bock Laundry Mach. Co.	490 U.S. 504	1989
Hardin v. Straub	490 U.S. 536	1989
Finley v. United States	490 U.S. 545	1989
Mansell v. Mansell	490 U.S. 581	1989
ASARCO Inc. v. Kadish	490 U.S. 605	1989
Hildwin v. Florida	490 U.S. 638	1989
Wards Cove Packing Co. v. Atonio	490 U.S. 642	1989
Hernandez v. Comm'r	490 U.S. 680	1989
Mead Corp. v. Tilley	490 U.S. 714	1989
Community for Creative Non-Violence v. Reid	490 U.S. 730	1989
Tompkins v. Texas	490 U.S. 754	1989
Martin v. Wilks	490 U.S. 755	1989
Alabama v. Smith	490 U.S. 794	1989
South Carolina v. Gathers	490 U.S. 805	1989
Newman-Green, Inc. v. Alfonzo-Larrain	490 U.S. 826	1989
Bd. of Equalization v. Sierra Summit, Inc.	490 U.S. 844	1989
Gomez v. United States	490 U.S. 858	1989
Sullivan v. Hudson	490 U.S. 877	1989
Lorance v. AT&T Technologies, Inc.	490 U.S. 900	1989
California v. United States	490 U.S. 920	1989
