= Stollenwerck =

Stollenwerck is a surname. Notable people with the surname include:

- Henry Stollenwerck (1930–2021), American politician
- Samantha Stollenwerck (born 1978), American singer-songwriter
