= In re Turner =

1867 United States court case on indentured servitude

- Court: United States Circuit Court for the District of Maryland
- Decided: October 13, 1867
- Citations: 24 F. Cas. 337 (C.C.D. Md. 1867); 1 Abb. U.S. 84; 6 Int. Rev. Rec. 147; 1 Am. Law T. Rep. U.S. Cts. 7

Court membership
- Judge sitting: Salmon P. Chase (riding circuit)

In re Turner, 24 F. Cas. 337 (C.C.D. Md. 1867), was a decision of the United States Circuit Court for the District of Maryland applying the Thirteenth Amendment to the United States Constitution to invalidate a Maryland law allowing courts to apprentice black children to white employers without the consent of their parents. Chief Justice of the United States Salmon P. Chase decided this case while riding circuit.

== Background ==
This case involved a Maryland state law allowing courts to assign African American children to apprenticeships without the consent of their parents. After Elizabeth Turner was forced into an apprenticeship under Philemon T. Hambleton in Talbot County, Maryland, her mother's friend, Charles Henry Minoky, filed a petition of habeas corpus on her behalf. The county Orphans' Court had ordered that Hambleton would only pay $37.50 ($771.90 in 2025) for service lasting until Turner reached adulthood.

When summoned to court, Hambleton claimed an interest in retaining Turner as an apprentice but was unwilling to pay for legal counsel, leaving the judgement to the circuit court. Despite Chase's requests, no member of the Maryland State Bar Association volunteered to serve as Hambleton's pro bono counsel. Turner was represented by Henry S. Stockbridge, who had previously served in the Maryland General Assembly and garnered legislative and popular support for adopting the Maryland Constitution of 1864 to abolish slavery one year prior to the Thirteenth Amendment to the U.S. Constitution. Since Turner's family could not afford a lawyer, the Freedmen's Bureau paid for Stockbridge to serve as counsel.

== Decision ==
Chief Justice of the United States Salmon P. Chase decided this case while riding circuit. Upholding the Civil Rights Act of 1866 as a constitutional exercise of Congress' power of enforcement under the Thirteenth Amendment, Chase voided the law for its discriminatory assignment of fewer rights to black child apprentices than white ones. For example, white apprentices were guaranteed an education in reading, writing, and arithmetic to be provided by their master, and only black apprentices could be transferred to other masters without their consent.

Noting that Turner and her mother were previously slaves of Hambleton prior to the Maryland Constitution of 1864 abolishing slavery, Chase concluded that the apprenticeship was merely an extension of the prior enslavement. The decision recounted that two days after enactment of the 1864 state constitution, Talbot County authorities collectively indentured the freed youth to white masters.

== Legacy ==
The Freedmen's Bureau of Maryland used Chase's decision to convince District Court Judge William F. Giles to invalidate 110 apprenticeships of black children made under similar circumstances. By the summer of 1868, over 90% of the black child apprentices were released, but the bureau reported that Maryland courts continued applying the voided statute until 1870, and it remained listed among Maryland statutes until at least 1876. The subsequent Civil Rights Cases of 1883 narrowed the scope of the Thirteenth Amendment to addressing the "badges and incidents of slavery," which federal courts have been wary to recognize among modern policies.

In a 2024 retrospective of the case, lawyer Lyle Cherneff argued that Hambleton may have declined to defend Turner's apprenticeship to avoid revealing himself as her father. During the Reconstruction era, former slave masters generally avoided recognizing their biracial children due to social stigma. Historian Harold Hyman has highlighted that along with Chase's unwritten dissent in Bradwell v. Illinois (1873), Chase was uniquely supportive of applying the Reconstruction Amendments to combat discrimination against women.
