= Crittenden–Johnson Resolution =

1861 U.S. Congress resolution

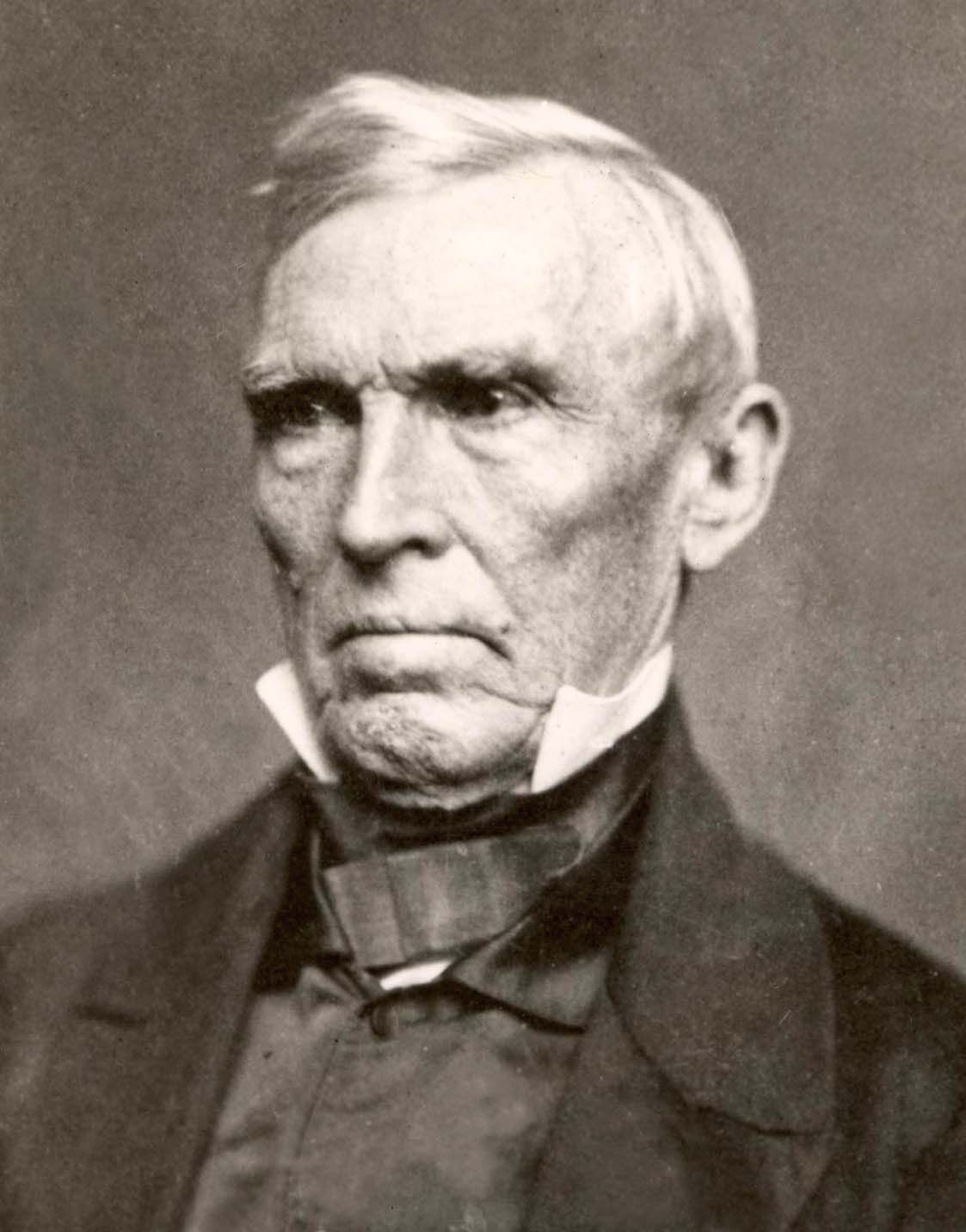
United States representative John J. Crittenden, for whom the resolution is named after

The Crittenden–Johnson Resolution (also known as the Crittenden Resolution and the War Aims Resolution) was proposed in the United States Congress early in the American Civil War as a conciliatory message to the slave states assuring them that the Northern war effort was not aimed at interfering with their rights to slavery, but solely towards restoring the Union. It was passed almost unanimously in July of 1861 after the shocking defeat at the First Battle of Bull Run. An attempt to reaffirm the propositions of that resolution in December of that year was tabled.

The resolution is sometimes confused with the "Crittenden Compromise," a series of unsuccessful proposals to amend the United States Constitution that were debated after slave states began seceding in an attempt to prevent the Confederate States from leaving the Union. Both measures are sometimes confused with the Corwin Amendment, a proposal to amend the Constitution that was adopted by the 36th Congress, which attempted to put slavery and other states' rights under constitutional protection; it passed Congress but was not ratified by the states.

== Historical background ==
The Crittenden–Johnson Resolution was passed almost unanimously by the 37th United States Congress on July 25, 1861. The bill was introduced as the War Aims Resolution, but it became better known for its sponsors Representative John J. Crittenden of Kentucky and Senator Andrew Johnson of Tennessee, both slaveholders. The American Civil War had begun on April 12, 1861, with various Southern states seceding in the following months. Both houses of Congress passed this resolution days after the First Battle of Bull Run made it clear that the war would not end quickly. It passed almost unanimously in July. In December of that year, a representative proposed a resolution that would have reaffirmed the principles of the Crittenden–Johnson Resolution. This later resolution was tabled by a vote of 71 to 65, largely along party lines favoring Republicans.

President Abraham Lincoln was concerned that the slave states of Missouri, Kentucky, and Maryland in the crucial upper south might leave the Union to join the Confederate States of America. If Maryland were lost, Washington, D.C. would be entirely surrounded by Confederate territory. Both Missouri and Kentucky were slave states of questionable loyalty to the Union that bordered on important Union territory; Lincoln was born in Kentucky and losing his birth state would be seen as a political failure. Also, the Ohio River marks Kentucky's northern border and was strategically important as the economic lifeline of Ohio, Illinois, and Indiana--each of which shipped goods down this river to the Mississippi River for sale or further shipment in New Orleans, Louisiana. Delaware (the other slave state that remained in the Union) had so few slaves that its loyalty would not be questioned.

== Meaning and context ==
Introduced as the War Aims Resolution, the bill defined limited conservative goals for the Union effort during the Civil War. Although it made no mention of slavery, the resolution intended that the Union Government would take no actions against the peculiar institution of slavery. Its second clause, discussed below, stated the war was fought not for "overthrowing or interfering with the rights or established institutions of those States," but to "defend and maintain the supremacy of the Constitution and to preserve the Union." The resolution intended to retain the loyalty of Unionists in the slave-holding border states, as well as reassure Northerners who would fight to save the Union but not to free the slaves. It implied the war would end when the seceding states returned to the Union, with slavery intact.

Pennsylvania Congressman Thaddeus Stevens, an abolitionist, had opposed the bill when it was introduced on the grounds that, in war, Congress and the President had the right to take “any step which would subdue the enemy,” but he abstained from voting on the measure. By the December of 1861, opinion had shifted and during an attempt by congress to reaffirm the resolution Stevens was able to move for a successful party-line vote for the rejection of the resolution by tabling consideration of it.

== Legislative action in the House ==
The resolution was introduced on July 19, 1861, as troops massed at Manassas Junction, Virginia, about 25 miles from Washington, two days before the Battle of Bull Run. The House passed it immediately after the battle, when Union forces were routed by the Confederate army, creating intense concern in Washington about southern soldiers “in arms around the capital.”

The House vote was in two parts, or "branches". The first branch read: "Resolved by the House of Representatives of the Congress of the United States, That the present deplorable civil war has been forced upon the country by the disunionists of the southern States now in revolt against the constitutional government, and in arms around the capital." This branch passed the House 121–2. Two congressmen voted against it, Henry C. Burnett (Kentucky) and John W. Reid (Missouri). Both were expelled at the next session of the 37th Congress for taking up arms against the United States.

The second branch read: "That in this national emergency, Congress, banishing all feelings of mere passion or resentment, will recollect only its duty to the whole country; that this war is not waged on their part in any spirit of oppression, or for any purpose of conquest or subjugation, or purpose of overthrowing or interfering with the rights or established institutions of those States, but to defend and maintain the supremacy of the Constitution, and to preserve the Union with all the dignity, equality, and rights of the several States unimpaired; and that as soon as these objects are accomplished the war ought to cease." This second branch passed the House 119–2. Two congressmen voted against this branch, John F. Potter (Wisconsin) and Albert G. Riddle (Ohio).

The House passed the complete measure on July 22, 1861, immediately after the battle.

== Senate action ==
On July 25, 1861, the Senate rejected the two branch division, and passed the entire resolution 30–5. The five senators voting against the resolution were: John C. Breckinridge (Kentucky), Waldo P. Johnson (Missouri), Trusten Polk (Missouri), Lazarus W. Powell (Kentucky), and Lyman Trumbull (Illinois). Breckinridge, Johnson, and Polk were expelled from the Senate at the next session of the 37th Congress for supporting the Confederate rebellion. A motion was brought to expel Powell, but was defeated, in part due to a defense given by Illinois Senator Trumbull.
