= Reconstruction Amendments =

Post-Civil War amendments to the United States Constitution

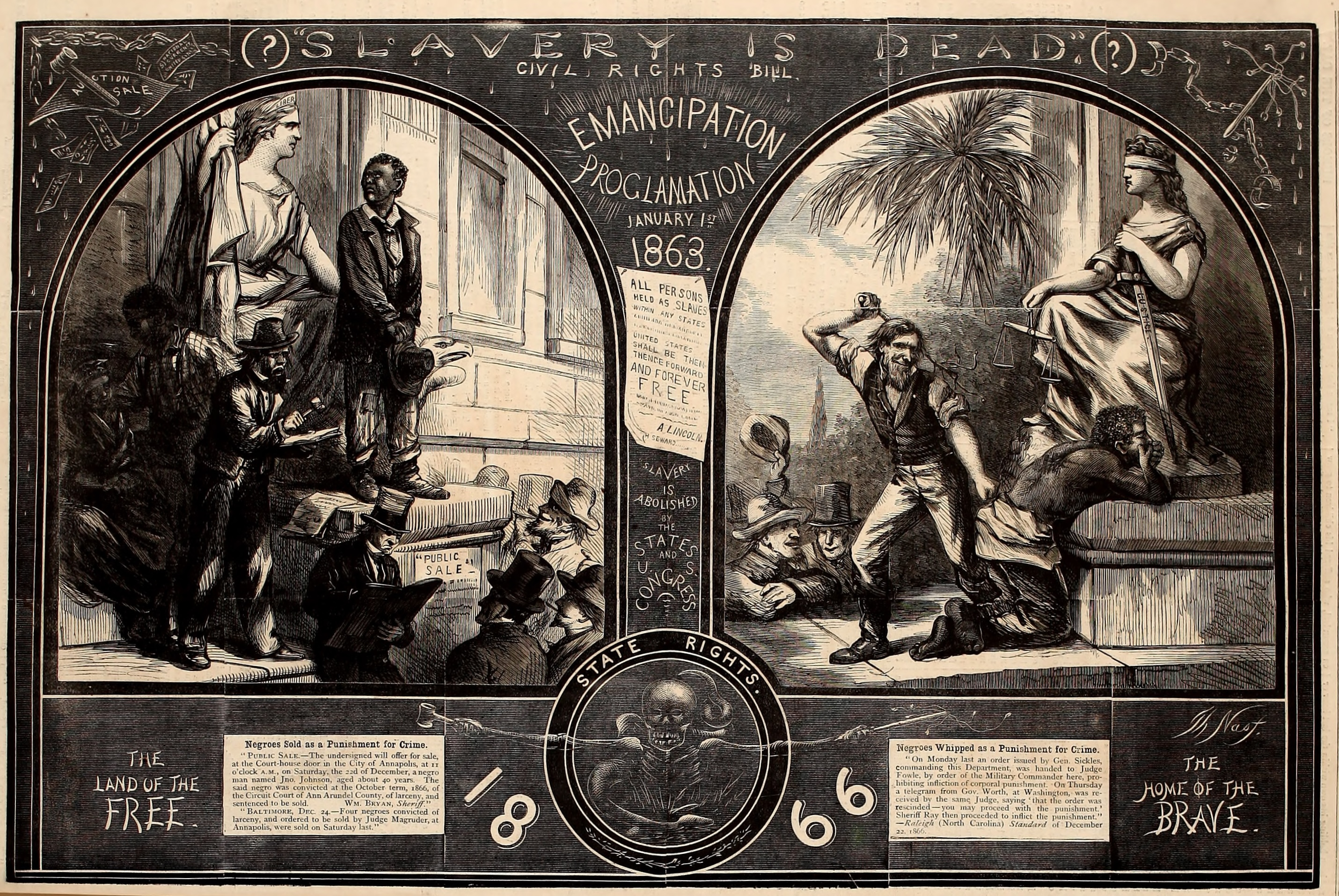
Slavery is dead? Thomas Nast presents the Republican argument for federal civil-rights legislation and constitutional amendment in this illustration for the January 12, 1867 issue of Harper's Weekly

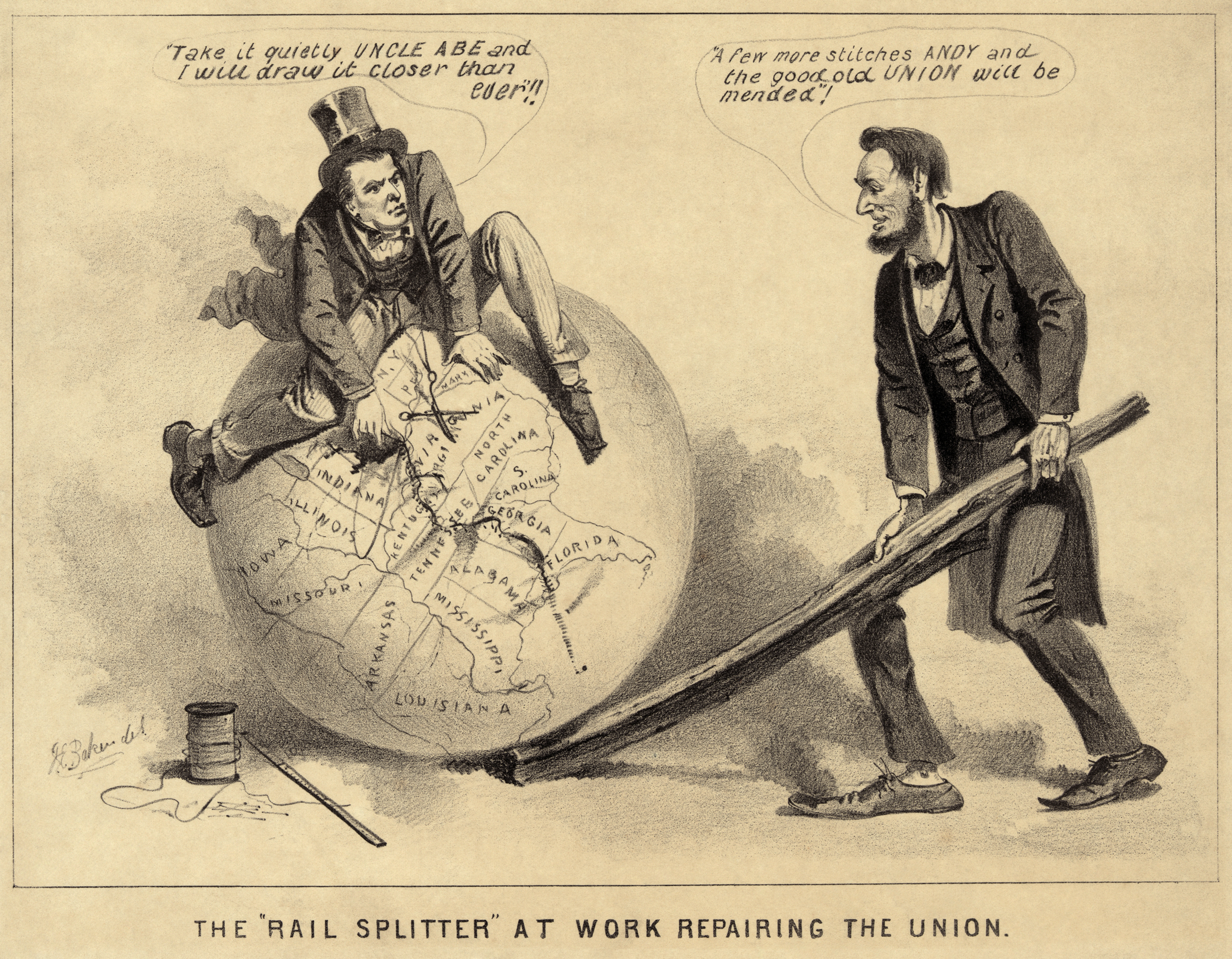
A political cartoon of Andrew Johnson and Abraham Lincoln, 1865, entitled "The 'Rail Splitter' at Work Repairing the Union." The caption reads (Johnson): Take it quietly Uncle Abe and I will draw it closer than ever!! (Lincoln): A few more stitches Andy and the good old Union will be mended!

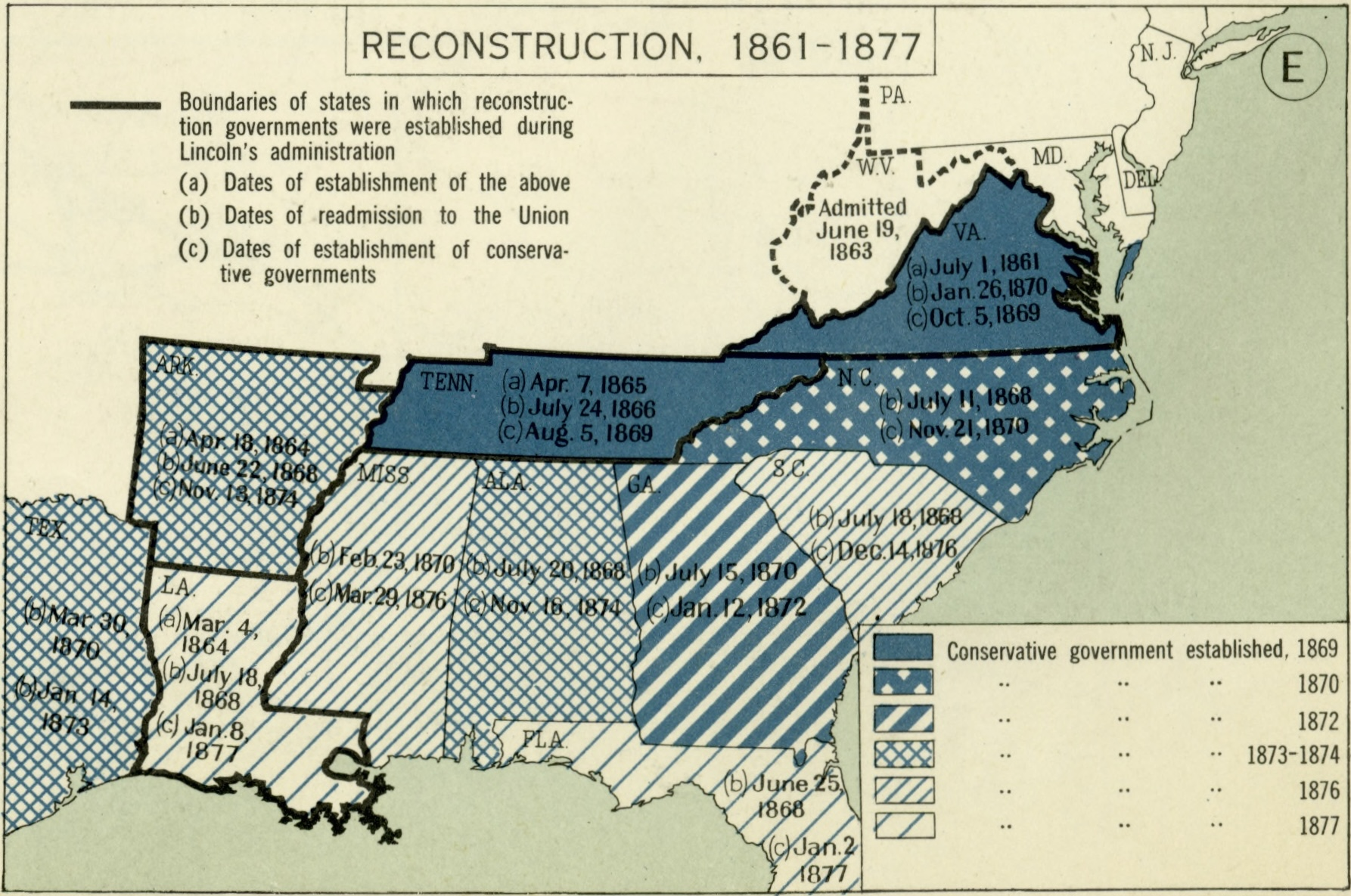
Map of Reconstruction, 1861–1877.

The Reconstruction Amendments, or the Civil War Amendments, are the Thirteenth, Fourteenth, and Fifteenth amendments to the United States Constitution, adopted between 1865 and 1870. The amendments were a part of the implementation of the Reconstruction of the American South that occurred after the Civil War.

The Thirteenth Amendment (proposed in 1864 and ratified in 1865) abolished slavery and involuntary servitude, except for those duly convicted of a crime. The Fourteenth Amendment (proposed in 1866 and ratified in 1868) addresses citizenship rights and equal protection of the laws for all persons. The Fifteenth Amendment (proposed in 1869 and ratified in 1870) prohibits discrimination in voting rights of citizens on the basis of "race, color, or previous condition of servitude."

These amendments were intended to guarantee the freedom of the formerly enslaved and grant certain civil rights to them, and to protect the formerly enslaved and all citizens of the United States from discrimination. However, the promise of these amendments was eroded by state laws and federal court decisions throughout the late 19th century. It was not fully realized until the Supreme Court decision in Brown v. Board of Education in 1954 and laws such as the Civil Rights Act of 1964 and the Voting Rights Act of 1965.

== Background ==
The Reconstruction Amendments were adopted between 1865 and 1870, the five years immediately following the American Civil War. The last time the Constitution had been amended was by the Twelfth Amendment in 1804, more than 60 years before.

These three amendments were part of a large movement to reconstruct the United States that followed the Civil War. Their proponents believed that they would transform the United States from a country that President Abraham Lincoln previously described as "half slave and half free." While Senator Charles Sumner argued that declarationism already justified citing the United States Declaration of Independence as authority for any human rights legislation, the Radical Republicans supported passage of the Reconstruction Amendments to ensure that newly granted civil and political rights could not be easily repealed.

== Thirteenth Amendment ==
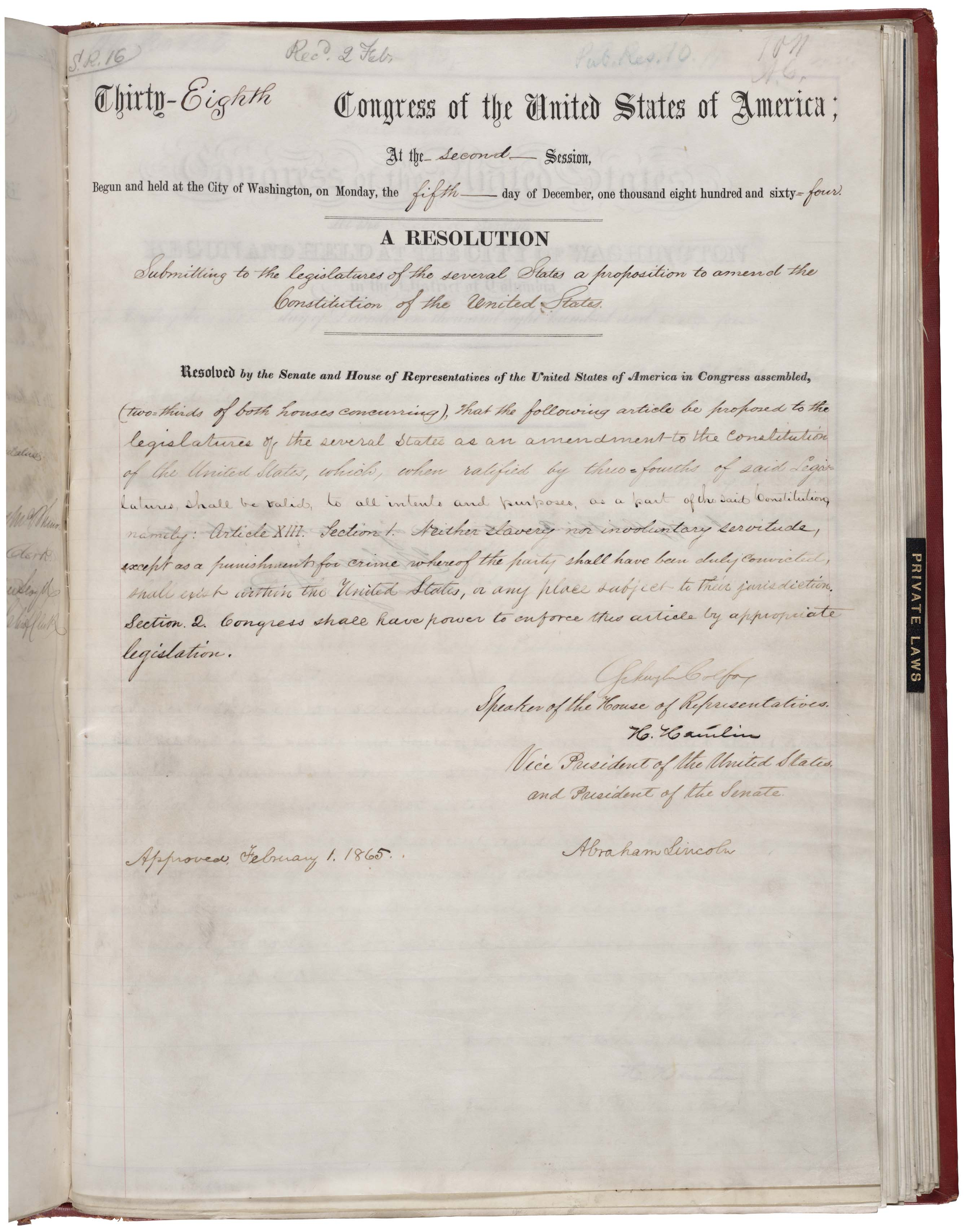
Text of the 13th Amendment

The Thirteenth Amendment to the United States Constitution abolished slavery and involuntary servitude, except as a punishment for a crime. It was passed by the U.S. Senate on April 8, 1864, and, after one unsuccessful vote and extensive legislative maneuvering by the Lincoln administration, the House followed suit on January 31, 1865. The measure was swiftly ratified by all but three Union states (the exceptions were Delaware, New Jersey, and Kentucky), and by a sufficient number of border and "reconstructed" Southern states, to be ratified by December 6, 1865. On December 18, 1865, Secretary of State William H. Seward proclaimed it to have been incorporated into the federal Constitution. It became part of the Constitution 61 years after the Twelfth Amendment, the longest interval between constitutional amendments to date.

Slavery had been tacitly enshrined in the original Constitution through provisions such as Article I, Section 2, Clause 3, commonly known as the Three-Fifths Compromise, which detailed how each state's total enslaved population would be factored into its total population count for the purposes of apportioning seats in the United States House of Representatives and direct taxes among the states. Although many enslaved people had been declared free by Lincoln's 1863 Emancipation Proclamation, their legal status after the Civil War was uncertain.

== Fourteenth Amendment ==
The Fourteenth Amendment to the United States Constitution was proposed by Congress on June 13, 1866. By July 9, 1868, it had received ratification by the legislatures of the required number of states in order to officially become the Fourteenth Amendment. On July 20, 1868, Secretary of State William Seward certified that it had been ratified and added to the federal Constitution. The amendment addresses citizenship rights and equal protection of the laws and was proposed in response to issues related to the treatment of freedmen following the war. The amendment was bitterly contested, particularly by Southern states, which were forced to ratify it in order to return their delegations to Congress. The Fourteenth Amendment is one of the most litigated parts of the Constitution, forming the basis for landmark decisions such as Strauder v. West Virginia (1880), regarding racial discrimination in jury service, Roe v. Wade (1973), regarding abortion, and Bush v. Gore (2000), regarding the 2000 presidential election.

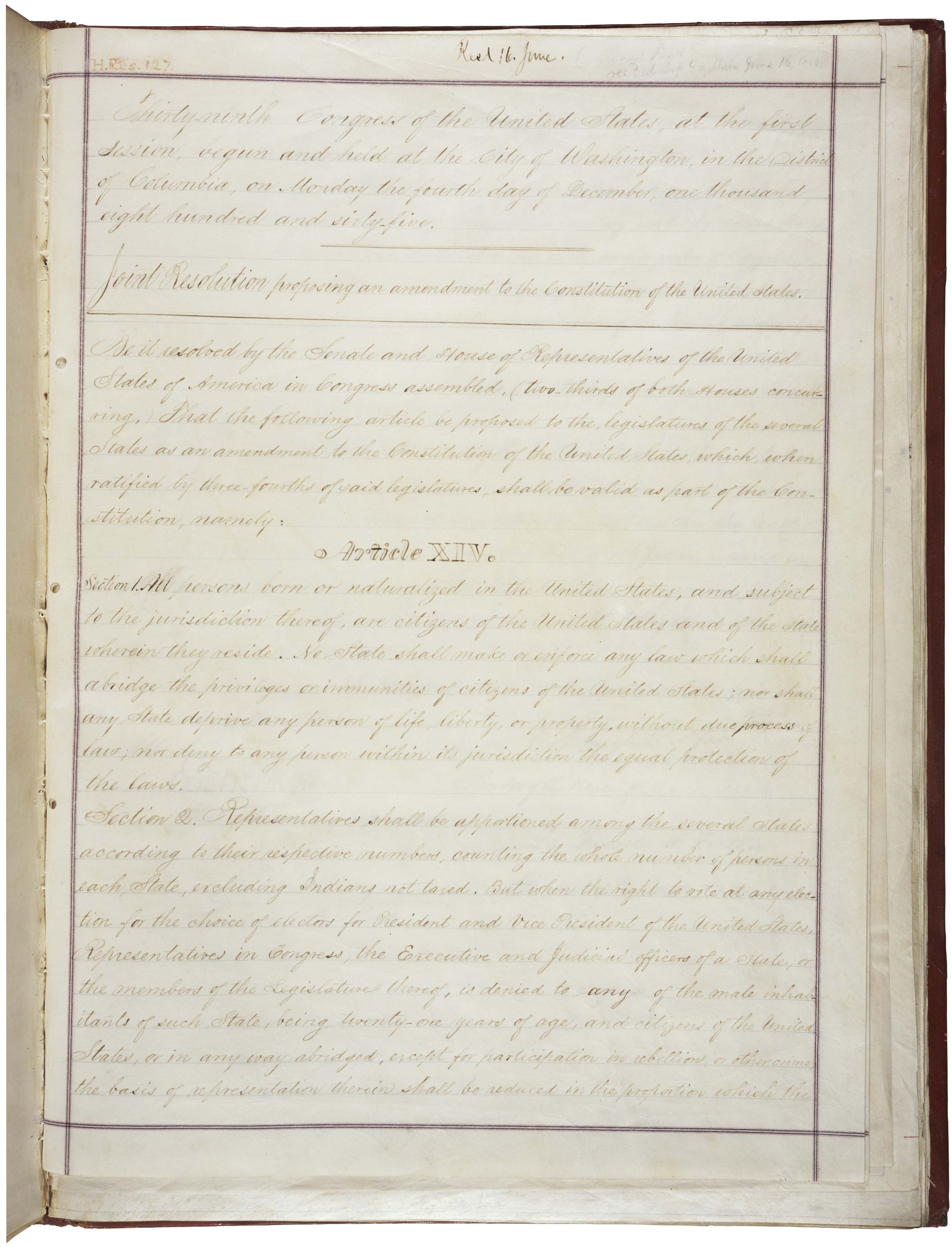
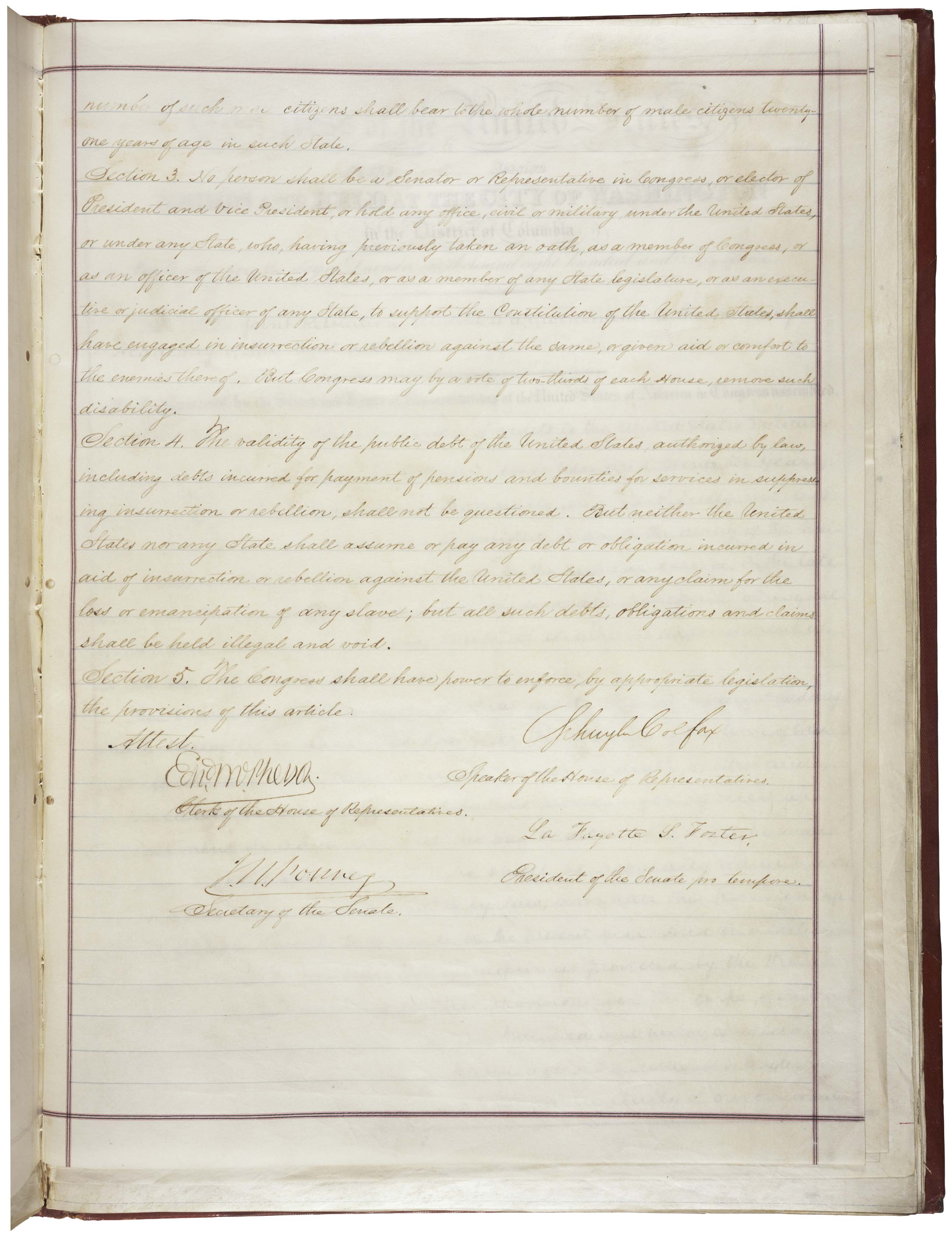
The two pages of the Fourteenth Amendment in the National Archives

The amendment's first section includes several clauses: the Citizenship Clause, the Privileges or Immunities Clause, the Due Process Clause, and the Equal Protection Clause. The Citizenship Clause provides a broad definition of citizenship, overruling the Supreme Court's decision in Dred Scott v. Sandford (1857), which had held that Americans descended from Africans could not be citizens of the United States. The Privileges or Immunities Clause has been interpreted in such a way that it does very little. While "Section 2 of the Fourteenth Amendment reduces congressional representation for states that deny suffrage on racial grounds," it was not enforced after southern states disenfranchised blacks in the late 19th and early 20th centuries. While Northern Congressmen in 1900 raised objections to the inequities of southern states being apportioned seats based on total populations when they excluded blacks, Southern Democratic Party representatives formed such a powerful bloc that opponents could not gain approval for change of apportionment.

The Due Process Clause prohibits state and local government officials from depriving persons of life, liberty, or property without legislative authorization. This clause has also been used by the federal judiciary to make most of the Bill of Rights applicable to the states, as well as to recognize substantive and procedural requirements that state laws must satisfy.

The Equal Protection Clause requires each state to provide equal protection under the law to all people within its jurisdiction. This clause was the basis for the U.S. Supreme Court's ruling in Brown v. Board of Education (1954), that racial segregation in public schools was unconstitutional, and its prohibition of laws against interracial marriage, in its ruling in Loving v. Virginia (1967).

== Fifteenth Amendment ==
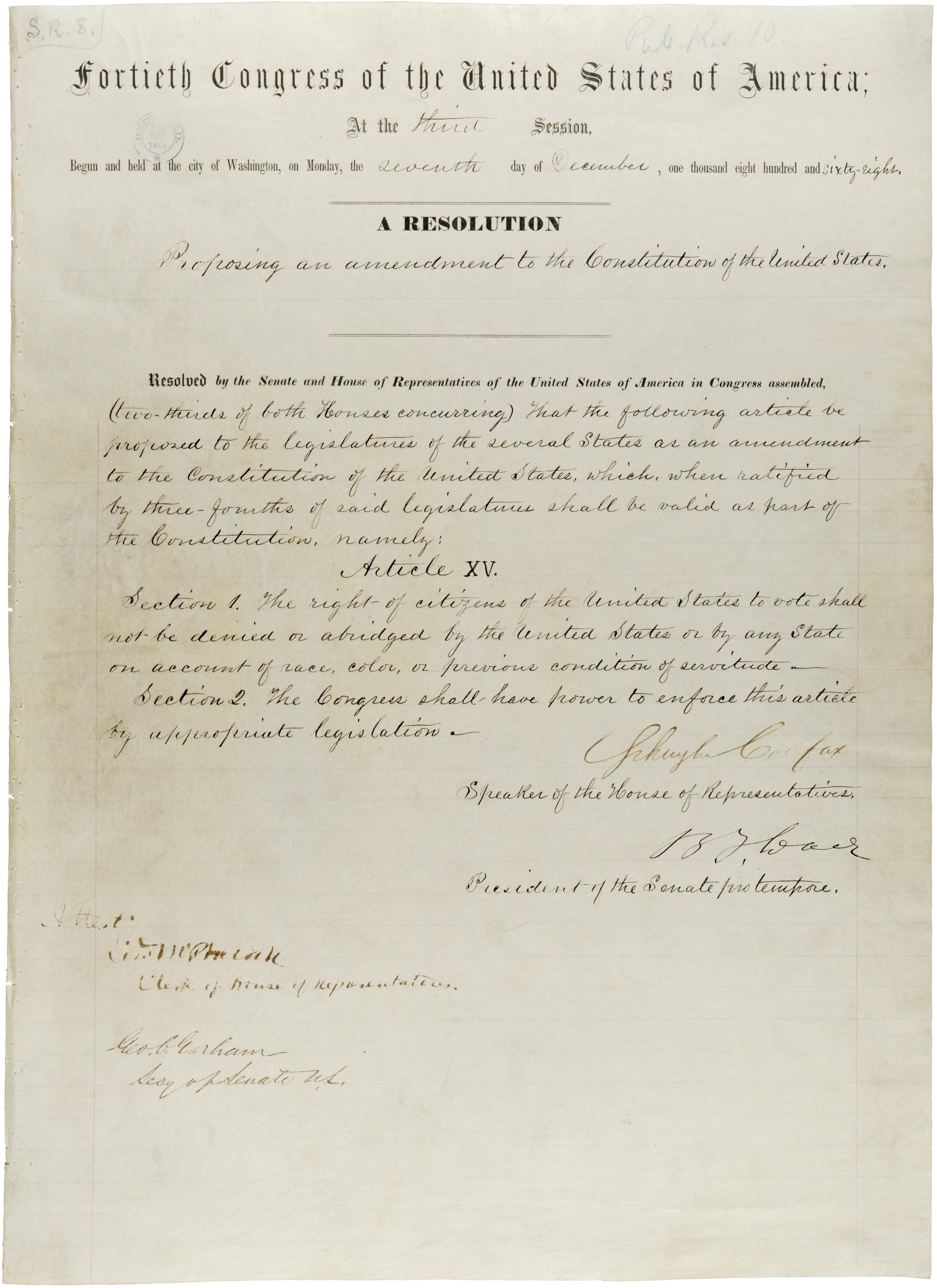
Text of the 15th Amendment

The Fifteenth Amendment to the United States Constitution prohibits the federal and state governments from denying a citizen the right to vote based on that citizen's "race, color, or previous condition of servitude." It was ratified on February 3, 1870, as the third and last of the Reconstruction Amendments.

In some of the early United States, such as New Jersey prior to 1807, citizens of all races, regardless of prior enslavement, could vote provided that they could meet other requirements like property ownership. At the time of the 1868 presidential election, black men could vote in ten of twenty-one Northern states and in none of the border states. The narrow election of Ulysses S. Grant to the presidency that year convinced a majority of Republicans that protecting the franchise of black men was important for the party's future. After rejecting broader versions of a suffrage amendment, Congress proposed a compromise amendment banning franchise restrictions on the basis of race, color, or previous servitude on February 26, 1869. The amendment survived a difficult ratification fight and was adopted on March 30, 1870. After blacks gained the vote, the Ku Klux Klan directed some of their attacks to disrupt their political meetings and intimidate them at the polls, to suppress black participation. In the mid-1870s, there was a rise in new insurgent groups, such as the Red Shirts and White League, who acted on behalf of white supremacists calling themselves "Redeemers", to violently suppress black voting. While Redeemers in the Democrats regained local power in southern state legislatures, through the 1880s and early 1890s, numerous blacks continued to be elected to local offices in many states, as well as to Congress as late as 1894.

Beginning around 1900, states in the former Confederacy passed new constitutions and other laws that incorporated methods to disenfranchise blacks, such as poll taxes, residency rules, and literacy tests administered by white staff, sometimes with exemptions for whites via grandfather clauses. When challenges reached the Supreme Court, it interpreted the amendment narrowly, ruling based on the stated intent of the laws rather than their practical effect. The results in voter suppression were dramatic, as voter rolls fell: nearly all blacks, as well as tens of thousands of poor whites in Alabama and other states, were forced off the voter registration rolls and out of the political system, effectively excluding millions of people from representation.

In the twentieth century, the Court interpreted the amendment more broadly, striking down grandfather clauses in Guinn v. United States (1915). It took a quarter-century to finally dismantle the white primary system in the "Texas primary cases" (1927–1953). With the South having become a one-party region after the disenfranchisement of blacks, Democratic Party primaries were the only competitive contests in those states. But Southern states reacted rapidly to Supreme Court decisions, often devising new ways to continue to exclude blacks from voter rolls and voting; most blacks in the South did not gain the ability to vote until after the passage of the mid-1960s federal civil rights legislation and the beginning of federal oversight of voter registration and district boundaries. The Twenty-fourth Amendment (1964) forbade the requirement for poll taxes in federal elections; by this time five of the eleven southern states continued to require such taxes. Together with the U.S. Supreme Court ruling in Harper v. Virginia State Board of Elections (1966), which forbade requiring poll taxes in state elections, blacks regained the opportunity to participate in the U.S. political system.

== Erosion, litigation, and scope ==
That is the result of the great Constitutional Revolution. [...] The Revolution found the rights of the individual at the mercy of the States; it rescued them from their arbitrary discretion, and placed them under the shield of National protection. It made the liberty and rights of every citizen in every State a matter of National concern. Out of a Republic of arbitrary local organizations it made a Republic of equal citizens—citizens exercising the right of self-government under and through the States, but as to their rights as citizens not subject to the arbitrary will of the States. It grafted upon the Constitution of the United States the guarantee of National citizenship; and it empowered Congress, as the organ of the National will, to enforce that guarantee by National legislation.

— Senator Carl Schurz, speech to 41st United States Congress on enforcement of the Fifteenth Amendment (May 19, 1870)

The promise of these amendments was eroded by state laws and federal court decisions throughout the late 19th century before being restored in the second half of the twentieth century. In 1876 and beyond, some states passed Jim Crow laws that limited the rights of African-Americans. Important Supreme Court decisions that undermined these amendments were the Slaughter-House Cases in 1873, which prevented rights guaranteed under the Fourteenth Amendment's privileges or immunities clause from being extended to rights under state law; and Plessy v. Ferguson in 1896 which originated the phrase "separate but equal" and gave federal approval to Jim Crow laws. The full benefits of the Thirteenth, Fourteenth, and Fifteenth amendments were not realized until the Supreme Court decision in Brown v. Board of Education in 1954 and laws such as the Civil Rights Act of 1964 and the Voting Rights Act of 1965. The Reconstruction Amendments affected the constitutional division of power between U.S. state governments and the federal government of the United States, for the Reconstruction Amendments "were specifically designed as an expansion of federal power and an intrusion on state sovereignty." The United States Supreme Court observed in 2024 with a view to the Fourteenth Amendment and thus the Reconstruction Amendments in general: "The Fourteenth Amendment 'expand[ed] federal power at the expense of state autonomy' and thus 'fundamentally altered the balance of state and federal power struck by the Constitution.'"

== See also ==
- Crittenden Compromise
- Corwin Amendment
- National Freedom Day
- Reconstruction Acts
- Forty acres and a mule
- Ballot access in the United States
- Black suffrage in the United States
- Voting rights in the United States
- List of amendments to the United States Constitution
- Slavery Abolition Act 1833 (United Kingdom)
