= Henry Stollenwerck =

American politician (1930–2021)

Member of the Texas House of Representatives from the 51-8 district
- In office January 8, 1963 – January 12, 1965
- Preceded by: District established
- Succeeded by: Dick McKissack

Personal details
- Born: Logan Henry Stollenwerck, Jr. December 6, 1930
- Died: March 2, 2021 (aged 90)
- Party: Republican
- Parent: Logan Stollenwerck (father)

Henry Logan Stollenwerck, Jr. (December 6, 1930 – March 2, 2021) was a Republican member of the Texas House of Representatives in the 58th Texas Legislature from January 1963 to January 1965. He is best known, during his legislative tenure, for having proposed the ratification of the Corwin Amendment, more than a century after Congress passed it in 1861.

During the 1964 Texas gubernatorial election he attempted to convince state Representative Horace Houston to run for the Republican gubernatorial nomination, but he chose to be the nominee for lieutenant governor and was selected as governor instead.

Preceded by New district	Member of the Texas House of Representatives from District 51-8 (Dallas); 1963–1965	Succeeded by Dick McKissack
