= Corwin Amendment =

Proposed US constitutional amendment to protect slavery from federal power

The Corwin Amendment is a proposed amendment to the United States Constitution that has never been adopted but, owing to the absence of a ratification deadline, could theoretically still be adopted by the state legislatures. It would have shielded slavery within the states from the federal constitutional amendment process and from abolition or interference by Congress.

Although the Corwin Amendment does not explicitly use the word slavery, it was designed specifically to protect slavery from federal power. The outgoing 36th United States Congress proposed the Corwin Amendment on March 2, 1861, shortly before the outbreak of the American Civil War, with the intent of preventing that war and preserving the Union. It passed Congress but was not ratified by the requisite number of state legislatures.

Several Southern states seceded after the 1860 presidential election, eventually forming the Confederate States of America. Several federal legislative measures, including the Corwin Amendment, were proposed during this period in the hope of either reconciling the sections of the United States or avoiding the secession of the border states. Senator William H. Seward and Representative Thomas Corwin, Republicans and allies of President-elect Abraham Lincoln, introduced the Corwin Amendment, which was endorsed by the outgoing president, James Buchanan, as well as by Lincoln himself in his first inaugural address in 1861. Because it was only ratified in a handful of Northern states and Kentucky, the Corwin Amendment failed to achieve its goal of preventing civil war and preserving the Union. Ultimately, it fell out of favor during the Civil War.

== Text ==
No amendment shall be made to the Constitution which will authorize or give to Congress the power to abolish or interfere, within any State, with the domestic institutions thereof, including that of persons held to labor or service by the laws of said State.

The text refers to slavery with terms such as "domestic institutions" and "persons held to labor or service" and avoids using the word "slavery", following the example set at the Constitutional Convention of 1787, which referred to slavery in its draft of the Constitution with comparable descriptions of legal status: "Person held to Service", "the whole Number of free Persons ..., three fifths of all other Persons", "The Migration and Importation of such Persons".

== Legislative history ==
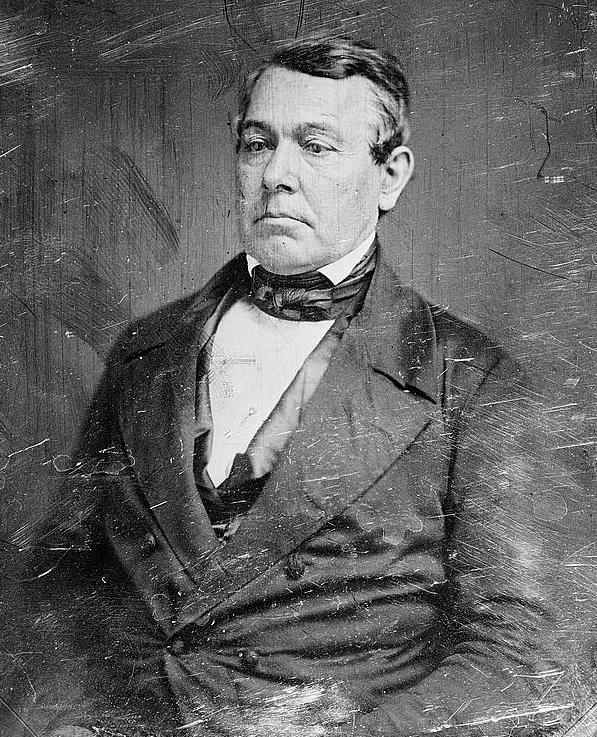
Representative Thomas Corwin, author of the amendment

In December 1860, when the second session of the 36th Congress was convened, the deepening rift between slave states and free states was erupting into a secession crisis. The Senate quickly formed a "Committee of Thirteen" to investigate possible legislative measures that might solve the slavery predicament. The House formed a "Committee of Thirty-three" with the same objective. More than 200 resolutions with respect to slavery, including 57 resolutions proposing constitutional amendments, were introduced in Congress. Most represented compromises designed to avert military conflict. Senator Jefferson Davis proposed one that explicitly protected property rights in slaves. A group of House members proposed a national convention to accomplish secession as a "dignified, peaceful, and fair separation" that could settle questions like the equitable distribution of the federal government's assets and rights to navigate the Mississippi River. Senator John J. Crittenden proposed a compromise consisting of six constitutional amendments and four Congressional resolutions, which were ultimately tabled on December 31.

On January 14, 1861, the House committee submitted a plan calling for an amendment to protect slavery, enforce fugitive slave laws, and repeal state personal liberty laws. The proposed constitutional amendment declared:

No amendment of this Constitution, having for its object any interference within the States with the relations between their citizens and those described in second section of the first article of the Constitution as "all other persons", shall originate with any State that does not recognize that relation within its own limits, or shall be valid without the assent of every one of the States composing the Union.

While the House debated the measure over the ensuing weeks, Mississippi, Florida, Alabama, Georgia, Louisiana and Texas had joined South Carolina in seceding from the Union. The contentious atmosphere in the House during the debate was relieved by abolitionist Republican Owen Lovejoy of Illinois, who questioned the amendment's reach: "Does that include polygamy, the other twin relic of barbarism?" Missouri Democrat John S. Phelps answered: "Does the gentleman desire to know whether he shall be prohibited from committing that crime?"

On February 26, Congressman Thomas Corwin, who had chaired the earlier House committee, introduced his own text as a substitute, but it was not adopted. The following day, after a series of preliminary votes, the House voted 123 to 71 in favor of the original resolution, but as this was below the required two-thirds majority, the measure was not passed. On February 28, however, the House returned to and approved Corwin's version—House (Joint) Resolution No. 80—by a vote of 133 to 65, just barely above the two-thirds threshold.

The Senate took up the proposed amendment on March 2, 1861, debating its merits without a recess through the pre-dawn hours on March 4. When the final vote was taken, the amendment passed with exactly the needed two-thirds majority – 24–12.

Soon afterward, it was sent to the state legislatures for ratification. The joint resolution containing the Corwin Amendment called for the amendment to be submitted to the state legislatures, as it was believed that the amendment had a greater chance of success in the legislatures of the Southern states than would have been the case in state ratifying conventions, given that state conventions were being conducted at that time throughout the South at which votes to secede from the Union were successful.

The Corwin Amendment was the second proposed "Thirteenth Amendment" submitted to the states by Congress. The first was the similarly ill-fated Titles of Nobility Amendment in 1810.

== Presidential responses ==
Outgoing President James Buchanan endorsed the Corwin Amendment by taking the unprecedented step of signing it. His signature on the Congressional joint resolution was unnecessary, as the President has no formal role in the constitutional amendment process.

Abraham Lincoln, in his first inaugural address on March 4, said of the Corwin Amendment:

I understand a proposed amendment to the Constitution—which amendment, however, I have not seen—has passed Congress, to the effect that the Federal Government shall never interfere with the domestic institutions of the States, including that of persons held to service ... holding such a provision to now be implied constitutional law, I have no objection to its being made express and irrevocable.

Just weeks prior to the outbreak of the Civil War, Lincoln sent a letter to each state's governor transmitting the proposed amendment, noting that Buchanan had approved it. His letter did not say anything opposing or supporting the amendment itself.

== Ratification history ==
The Corwin Amendment has been ratified by:

Ratified amendment Ratified, then rescinded Ratification questionable

1. Kentucky: April 4, 1861
2. Ohio: May 13, 1861 (rescinded ratification – March 31, 1864)
3. Rhode Island: May 31, 1861 (rescinded ratification – June 30, 2026)
4. Maryland: January 10, 1862 (rescinded ratification – April 7, 2014)
5. Illinois: June 2, 1863 (rescinded ratification – April 4, 2022)

On February 14, 1862, prior to the 1863 ratification of the amendment by the Illinois General Assembly, an Illinois state constitutional convention purported to ratify the Corwin Amendment. However, since Illinois state lawmakers were sitting as delegates to a convention at the time—and not meeting as the actual state legislature—that action was of questionable validity.

The Restored Government of Virginia, consisting mostly of representatives of what would become West Virginia, voted to approve the amendment on February 13, 1862. However, West Virginia did not ratify the amendment after it became a state in 1863.

In 1963, more than a century after the Corwin Amendment was submitted to the state legislatures by Congress, a joint resolution to ratify it was introduced in the Texas House of Representatives by Dallas Republican Henry Stollenwerck. His reason for doing so was likely related to the ongoing desegregation pushed for by the federal government. His joint resolution was referred to the House's Committee on Constitutional Amendments on March 7, 1963, but received no further consideration.

In 2026, the Rhode Island General Assembly started a process to rescind its ratification of the amendment. This was approved on June 30, 2026.

== Attempted withdrawal of amendment ==
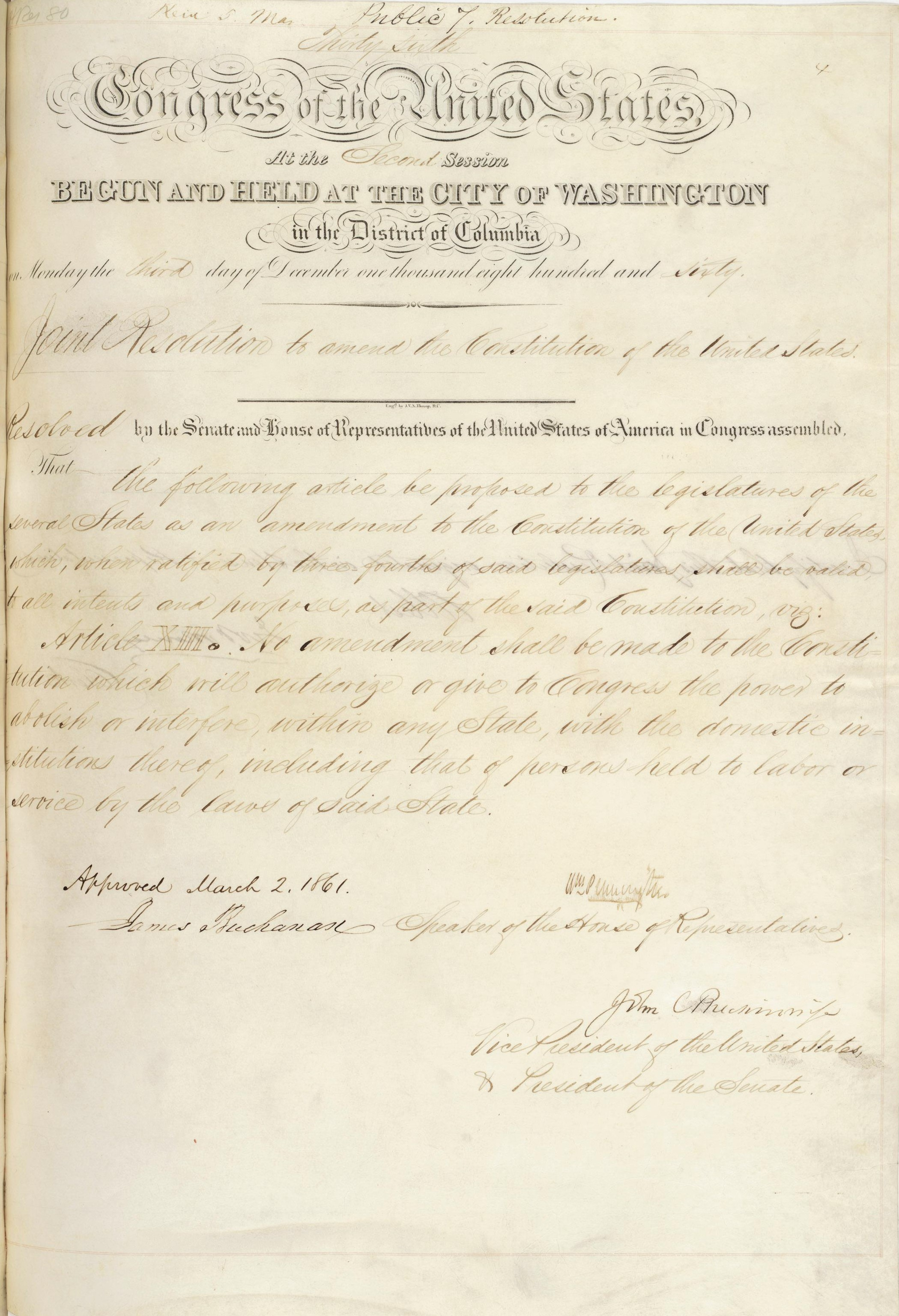
The Corwin Amendment as approved by the 36th U.S. Congress, March 1861

On February 8, 1864, during the 38th Congress, with the prospects for a Union victory improving, Republican Senator Henry B. Anthony of Rhode Island introduced Senate (Joint) Resolution No. 25 to withdraw the Corwin Amendment from further consideration by the state legislatures and to halt the ratification process. That same day, Anthony's joint resolution was referred to the Senate's Committee on the Judiciary. On May 11, 1864, Illinois Senator Lyman Trumbull, Chairman of the Judiciary Committee, received the Senate's permission to discharge Senate (Joint) Resolution No. 25 from the committee, but no further action was taken on Anthony's joint resolution.

== Debates over hypothetical impact ==
The Corwin Amendment never became law. But if it had done so, then, under the plain meaning rule, it would have made slavery immune to the constitutional amendment procedures and to interference by Congress. As a result, the later Reconstruction Amendments (Thirteenth, Fourteenth, and Fifteenth) would not have been permissible, as they abolish or interfere with the domestic institution of the states.

A competing theory, however, suggests that only the entrenched clauses of the original constitution (of which the only one still active is the clause protecting the states' equal voting power in the Senate) can be protected from subsequent amendments under the established amending formula. Under this theory, a later amendment conflicting with an already-ratified Corwin Amendment could either explicitly repeal the Corwin Amendment (as the Twenty-first Amendment explicitly repealed the Eighteenth Amendment) or be inferred to have either superseded or partially or completely repealed any conflicting provisions of an already-adopted Corwin Amendment.

== See also ==
- List of amendments to the United States Constitution, amendments sent to the states, both ratified and unratified
- Peace Conference of 1861
