= Ex parte Yarbrough =

1884 US Supreme Court judgment on voting rights

Ex Parte Yarbrough; The Ku Klux Cases
- Supreme Court of the United States

Argued January 23–24, 1884 Decided March 3, 1884
- Full case name: Ex Parte Yarbrough et al.
- Citations: 110 U.S. 651 (more)

Holding
- Congress may prevent private individuals from interfering with the right to vote in federal elections.

Court membership
- Chief Justice Morrison Waite Associate Justices Samuel F. Miller · Stephen J. Field; Joseph P. Bradley · John M. Harlan; William B. Woods · Stanley Matthews; Horace Gray · Samuel Blatchford

Case opinion
- Majority: Miller, joined by unanimous

Laws applied
- Article I, Section 4 of the U.S. Constitution and the Fifteenth Amendment

Ex parte Yarbrough, or The Ku Klux Cases, 110 U.S. 651 (1884), was a decision of the Supreme Court of the United States involving Congress's power to punish individuals who interfere with the right to vote in federal elections. The Court sustained the convictions of Jasper Yarbrough and seven others, who had been found guilty of beating and injuring an African-American man to prevent him from voting. The decision marked one of the few times that the post-Reconstruction Court upheld Congress's ability to protect civil rights.

== Background ==
The Fifteenth Amendment to the U.S. Constitution states that "the right of citizens of the United States to vote shall not be denied or abridged by the United States or by any State on account of race, color, or previous condition of servitude", and it gives Congress the ability to enforce that right "by appropriate legislation". Congress passed several laws to enforce the Fifteenth Amendment, but the federal judiciary was reluctant to protect former slaves' right to vote. In United States v. Reese (1876), the Supreme Court struck down several sections of the Enforcement Act of 1870 that outlawed racial discrimination on the part of local elections officials. The Court invalidated an anti-discrimination law in the Civil Rights Cases (1883), and it voided Section 5519 of the Revised Statutes (formerly Section 2 of the Ku Klux Act of 1871), which prevented individuals from interfering with legally protected rights, in United States v. Harris (1883).

Jasper Yarbrough and seven fellow members of the Ku Klux Klan beat and injured Berry Saunders, an African-American man, in order to keep him from casting a vote in a Georgia congressional election. They were charged with violating two provisions of federal law: Sections 5508 (derived from Section 6 of the Enforcement Act of 1870) and 5520 (derived from Section 2 of the Ku Klux Act of 1871) of the Revised Statutes, which prevented individuals from conspiring to deprive others of their constitutional rights and their right to vote in federal elections. The defendants were tried and convicted in the Circuit Court for the Northern District of Georgia, and five were sentenced to two years' imprisonment each. They sought a writ of habeas corpus, arguing that Congress's power to regulate elections did not permit it to regulate the conduct of individuals. The Supreme Court heard arguments in the case on January 23 and 24, 1884.

== Decision ==
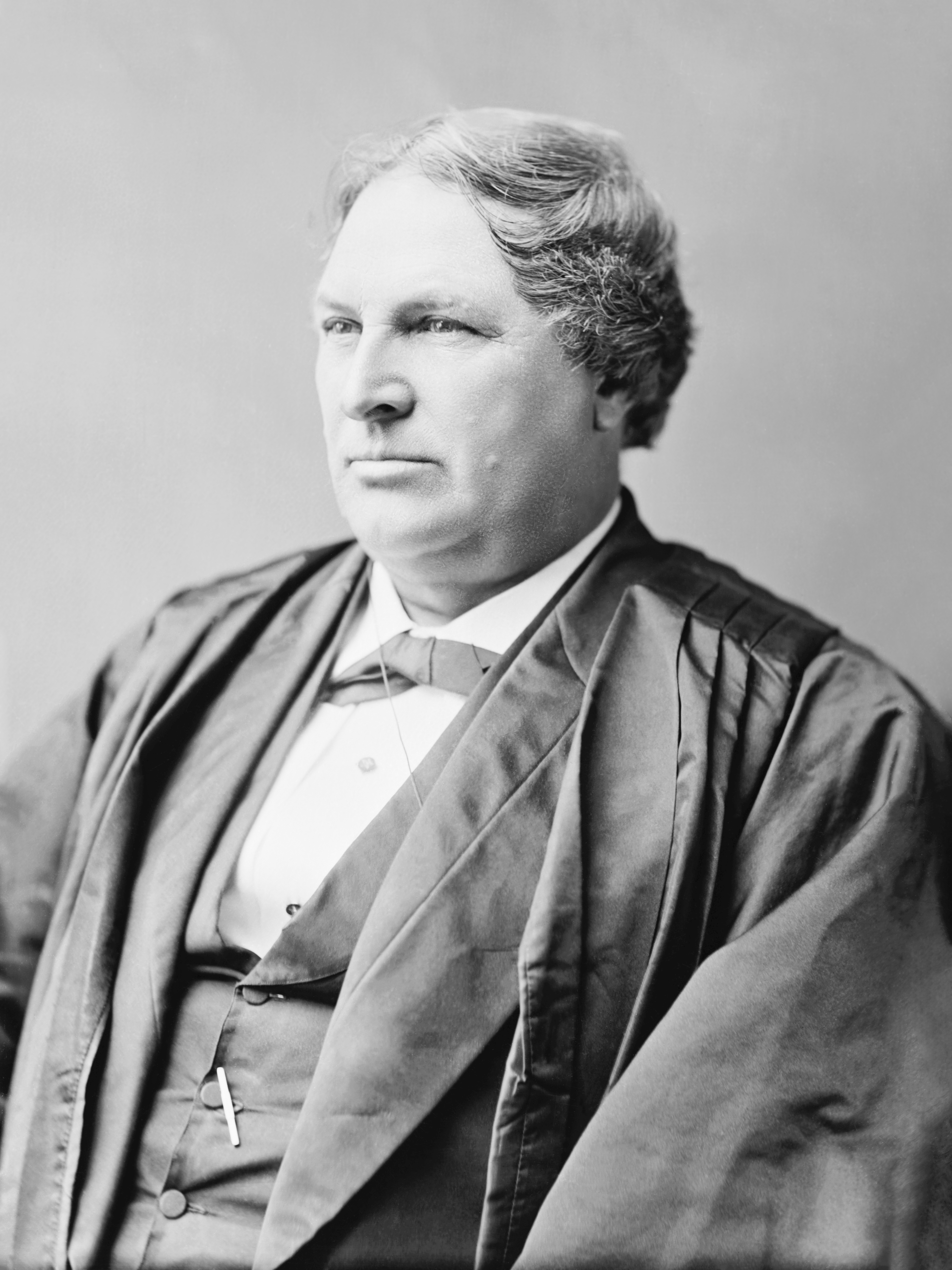
Justice Samuel F. Miller delivered the opinion of the Court in Yarbrough.

The Court rendered its decision on March 3, 1884. In a unanimous opinion by Justice Samuel F. Miller, the justices rejected the appeal and upheld Yarbrough's conviction. Miller interpreted the Fifteenth Amendment broadly, arguing that it directly conferred a right to vote in federal elections. Once an individual met the qualifications to vote imposed by state law, the Court concluded, he had a right to vote, and Congress could exercise its power "to protect the citizen in the exercise of rights conferred by the Constitution of the United States essential to the healthy organization of the government itself". Miller cited Article I, Section 4 of the Constitution, which authorizes Congress to regulate federal elections. In closing, he wrote:

If the recurrence of such acts as these prisoners stand convicted of are too common in one quarter of the country, and give omen of danger from lawless violence, the free use of money in elections, arising from the vast growth of recent wealth in other quarters, presents equal cause for anxiety. If the government of the United States has within its constitutional domain no authority to provide against these evils, – if the very sources of power may be poisoned by corruption or controlled by violence and outrage, without legal restraint, – then, indeed, is the country in danger, and its best powers, its highest purposes, the hopes which it inspires, and the love which enshrines it, are at the mercy of the combinations of those who respect no right but brute force on the one hand, and unprincipled corruptionists on the other.

== Analysis and legacy ==
The Court in Yarbrough "fused the Fifteenth Amendment and article I, section 4 to come up with a bold, highly nationalist approach to black voting rights", in the words of the scholar Richard M. Valelly. According to the political scientist Rogers Smith, it was "the one Supreme Court decision markedly favorable to black voting rights" in the post-Reconstruction era. In subsequent years, the Court's interpretation of the Fifteenth Amendment continued to change: in a decision in James v. Bowman (1903) that did not mention Yarbrough, it struck down by a 6–2 vote another provision of the Enforcement Acts on the grounds that it was not authorized by the Fifteenth Amendment. Yarbrough has received limited attention from scholars, although recent analyses have emphasized it more strongly. The decision played a prominent role in the voter registration campaign of the 1960s, and Sefton writes that it "forms part of the philosophical foundation of the constitutional law of all civil rights". According to the scholar William Gillette, Miller's "remarkable" opinion "began to build the judicial foundation for the civil rights movement".
