= Civil Rights Act of 1875 =

United States federal law

- Long title: An Act to protect all citizens in their civil and legal rights.
- Acronyms (colloquial): CRA 1875
- Nicknames: Enforcement Act, Force Act, and Sumner Civil Rights Bill
- Enacted by: the 43rd United States Congress

Citations
- Statutes at Large: 18 Stat. 335-337

Legislative history
- Committee consideration by Senate Judiciary; Passed the House on February 4, 1875 (162–100); Passed the Senate on February 27, 1875 (38–26); Signed into law by President Ulysses S. Grant on March 1, 1875

United States Supreme Court cases
- Civil Rights Cases, 109 U.S. 3 (1883)

The Civil Rights Act of 1875, sometimes called the Enforcement Act (Note: Not to be confused with the Enforcement Acts.) or the Force Act, was a United States federal law enacted during the Reconstruction era in response to civil rights violations against African Americans. The bill was passed by the 43rd United States Congress and signed into law by President Ulysses S. Grant on March 1, 1875. The act was designed to "protect all citizens in their civil and legal rights", providing for equal treatment in public accommodations and public transportation and prohibiting exclusion from jury service. It was originally drafted by Senator Charles Sumner in 1870, but was not passed until almost a year after Sumner's 1874 death. The law was not effectively enforced, partly because President Grant had favored different measures to help him suppress election-related violence against blacks and Republicans in the Southern United States.

The Reconstruction era ended with the resolution of the 1876 presidential election, and the Civil Rights Act of 1875 was the last federal civil rights law enacted until the passage of the Civil Rights Act of 1957. In 1883, the Supreme Court ruled in the Civil Rights Cases that the public accommodation sections of the act were unconstitutional, saying Congress was not afforded control over private persons or corporations under the Equal Protection Clause. Parts of the Civil Rights Act of 1875 were later re-adopted in the Civil Rights Act of 1964 and the Civil Rights Act of 1968, both of which cited the Commerce Clause as the source of Congress's power to regulate private actors.

== Legislative history ==
The drafting of the bill was performed early in 1870 by United States Senator Charles Sumner, a dominant Radical Republican in the Senate, with the assistance of John Mercer Langston, a prominent African American who established the law department at Howard University. The bill was proposed by Senator Sumner and co-sponsored by Representative Benjamin F. Butler, both Republicans from Massachusetts, in the 41st Congress of the United States in 1870. Congress removed the coverage of public schools that Sumner had included. The act was passed by the 43rd Congress in February 1875 as a memorial to honor Sumner, who had died almost a year earlier. It was signed into law by United States President Ulysses S. Grant on March 1, 1875.

The Massachusetts Republican Party modeled the bill on their state's 1865 public accommodations act, the first such law in the nation. Since southern businesses often claimed an inability to serve African American customers because of the damage to their relations with companies in other states, Republicans argued that a national response was needed.

== Enforcement ==
President Grant had wanted an entirely different law to help him suppress election-related violence against blacks and Republicans in the South. Congress did not give him that, but instead wrote a law for equal rights to public accommodations that was passed as a memorial to Grant's bitterest enemy, the late Senator Charles Sumner. Grant never commented on the 1875 law, and did nothing to enforce it, says historian John Hope Franklin. Grant's Justice Department ignored it and did not send copies to US attorneys, says Franklin, while many federal judges called it unconstitutional before the Supreme Court shut it down. Franklin concludes regarding Grant and Hayes administrations, "The Civil Rights Act was never effectively enforced." Public opinion was opposed, with the black community in support. Historian Rayford Logan looking at newspaper editorials finds the press was overwhelmingly opposed.

== Case law ==
The Supreme Court, in an 8–1 decision, declared sections of the act unconstitutional in the Civil Rights Cases on October 15, 1883. Justice John Marshall Harlan provided the lone dissent. The Court held the Equal Protection Clause within the Fourteenth Amendment prohibits discrimination by the state and local government, but it does not give the federal government the power to prohibit discrimination by private individuals and organizations. The Court also held that the Thirteenth Amendment was meant to eliminate "the badge of slavery," but not to prohibit racial discrimination in public accommodations. In response to the court's ruling, U.S. Representative James E. O'Hara introduced a resolution in December 1883 in support of a "constitutional amendment on civil rights", though it lacked support and failed. The Civil Rights Act of 1875 was the last federal civil rights bill signed into law until the Civil Rights Act of 1957, enacted during the Civil Rights Movement.

== Legacy ==
The Civil Rights Act of 1875 is notable as the last major piece of legislation related to Reconstruction that was passed by Congress during the Reconstruction era. These include the Civil Rights Act of 1866, the four Reconstruction Acts of 1867 and 1868, the three Enforcement Acts of 1870 and 1871, and the three Constitutional Amendments adopted between 1865 and 1870.

Provisions contained in the Civil Rights Act of 1875 were later readopted by Congress during the Civil Rights Movement as part of the Civil Rights Act of 1964 and the Civil Rights Act of 1968. The 1964 and 1968 acts relied upon the Commerce Clause contained in Article One of the Constitution of the United States rather than the Equal Protection Clause within the Fourteenth Amendment.

== See also ==
- United States labor law
- Equality Act (United States), proposed Act seeking to prevent discrimination in public accommodations

== Bibliography ==
- Boyd, Raphael O'Hara (2001). "Service in the Midst of the Storm: James Edward O'Hara and Reconstruction in North Carolina". The Journal of Negro History. 86 (3): 319–335. JSTOR 1562450.
- Franklin, John Hope (Winter 1974). "The Enforcement of the Civil Rights Act of 1875". Prologue Magazine. 6 (4): 225–235.
- Gerber, Richard A.; Friedlander, Alan (2008). The Civil Rights Act of 1875: A Reexamination. Connecticut Academy of Arts and Sciences. ISBN 9781878508287.
- Gillette, William (1982). "Insignificant Victory: The Civil Rights Act of 1875". Retreat from Reconstruction, 1869--1879. LSU Press. pp. 259–279. ISBN 9780807110065.
- Hoffer, Williamjames Hull (2010). The Caning of Charles Sumner: Honor, Idealism, and the Origins of the Civil War. Johns Hopkins University Press. ISBN 9780801899577.
- Logan, Rayford Whittingham (1997) [1965]. The Betrayal of the Negro: From Rutherford B. Hayes to Woodrow Wilson. DaCapo Press. ISBN 9780306807589.
- Smith, Jean Edward (2002). Grant. Simon and Schuster. ISBN 9780684849270.
- Douglass, Frederick (1892). Life and Times of Frederick Douglass. De Wolfe, Fiske & Co., Third Part, Chapter VI, "The Supreme Court Decision."
