= List of United States Supreme Court cases, volume 109 =

Supreme Court of the United States
- Interactive map of Supreme Court of the United States
- 38°53′26″N 77°00′16″W
- Established: March 4, 1789; 237 years ago
- Location: Washington, D.C.
- Coordinates: 38°53′26″N 77°00′16″W
- Composition method: Presidential nomination with Senate confirmation
- Authorised by: Constitution of the United States, Art. III, § 1
- Judge term length: life tenure, subject to impeachment and removal
- Number of positions: 9 (by statute)
- Website: supremecourt.gov

This is a list of cases reported in volume 109 of United States Reports, decided by the Supreme Court of the United States in 1883 and 1884.

== Justices of the Supreme Court at the time of volume 109 U.S. ==
The Supreme Court is established by Article III, Section 1 of the Constitution of the United States, which says: "The judicial Power of the United States, shall be vested in one supreme Court . . .". The size of the Court is not specified; the Constitution leaves it to Congress to set the number of justices. Under the Judiciary Act of 1789 Congress originally fixed the number of justices at six (one chief justice and five associate justices). Since 1789 Congress has varied the size of the Court from six to seven, nine, ten, and back to nine justices (always including one chief justice).

When the cases in volume 109 U.S. were decided the Court comprised the following nine members:

Portrait	Justice	Office	Home State	Succeeded	Date confirmed by the Senate (Vote)	Tenure on Supreme Court
	Morrison Waite	Chief Justice	Ohio	Salmon P. Chase	January 21, 1874 (63–0)	March 4, 1874 – March 23, 1888 (Died)
	Samuel Freeman Miller	Associate Justice	Iowa	Peter Vivian Daniel	July 16, 1862 (Acclamation)	July 21, 1862 – October 13, 1890 (Died)
	Stephen Johnson Field	Associate Justice	California	newly created seat	March 10, 1863 (Acclamation)	May 10, 1863 – December 1, 1897 (Retired)
	Joseph P. Bradley	Associate Justice	New Jersey	newly created seat	March 21, 1870 (46–9)	March 23, 1870 – January 22, 1892 (Died)
	John Marshall Harlan	Associate Justice	Kentucky	David Davis	November 29, 1877 (Acclamation)	December 10, 1877 – October 14, 1911 (Died)
	William Burnham Woods	Associate Justice	Georgia	William Strong	December 21, 1880 (39–8)	January 5, 1881 – May 14, 1887 (Died)
	Stanley Matthews	Associate Justice	Ohio	Noah Haynes Swayne	May 12, 1881 (24–23)	May 17, 1881 – March 22, 1889 (Died)
	Horace Gray	Associate Justice	Massachusetts	Nathan Clifford	December 20, 1881 (51–5)	January 9, 1882 – September 15, 1902 (Died)
	Samuel Blatchford	Associate Justice	New York	Ward Hunt	March 22, 1882 (Acclamation)	April 3, 1882 – July 7, 1893 (Died)

== Notable Cases in 109 U.S. ==
=== Civil Rights Cases ===
The Civil Rights Cases, 3 (1883), were a group of five cases in which the Supreme Court held that the Thirteenth and Fourteenth Amendments did not empower Congress to outlaw racial discrimination by private individuals. The holding regarding the 13th Amendment was overturned by the Court in the 1968 case Jones v. Alfred H. Mayer Co. The holding regarding the 14th Amendment not applying to private entities is still valid precedent, but in the 1964 case Heart of Atlanta Motel, Inc. v. United States, the Supreme Court held that Congress could prohibit racial discrimination by private actors via another part of the Constitution, the Commerce Clause.

The only dissenting justice in the Civil Rights Cases, John Marshall Harlan, correctly predicted the decision's negative long-term consequences: it put an end to the attempts by Radical Republicans to ensure the civil rights of blacks, and triggered widespread segregation in housing, employment, and public life that confined them to second-class citizenship throughout much of the United States until the passage of civil rights legislation in the 1960s in the wake of the Civil Rights Movement.

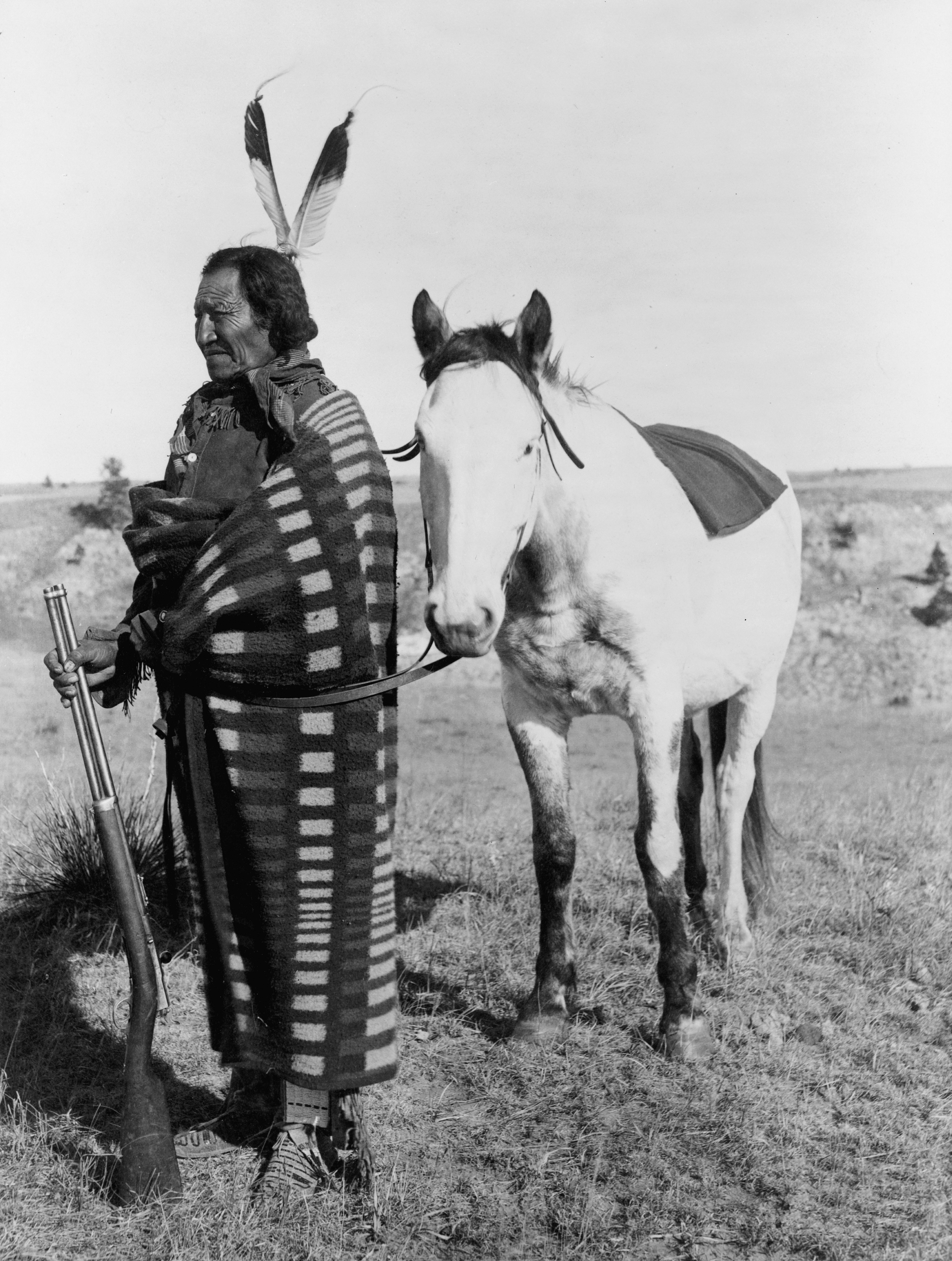
Chief Crow Dog

=== Ex Parte Crow Dog ===
Ex parte Crow Dog, 556 (1883), was a Supreme Court decision that followed the death of one member of a Native American tribe at the hands of another on reservation land. Crow Dog was a member of the Brulé band of the Lakota Sioux. On August 5, 1881 he shot and killed Spotted Tail, a Lakota chief. The tribal council dealt with the incident according to Sioux tradition, and Crow Dog paid restitution to the dead man's family. However, the U.S. authorities then prosecuted Crow Dog for murder in a federal court. He was found guilty and sentenced to hang. He petitioned the Supreme Court for a writ of habeas corpus, arguing that the federal court had no jurisdiction to try cases when the offense had already been tried by the tribal council. The Court found in his favor and Crow Dog was released. The case led to the Major Crimes Act in 1885, which placed some major crimes (initially seven, now 15) under federal jurisdiction if committed by a Native American against another Native American on a reservation or on tribal land.

== Citation style ==
Under the Judiciary Act of 1789 the federal court structure at the time comprised District Courts, which had general trial jurisdiction; Circuit Courts, which had mixed trial and appellate (from the US District Courts) jurisdiction; and the United States Supreme Court, which had appellate jurisdiction over the federal District and Circuit courts—and for certain issues over state courts. The Supreme Court also had limited original jurisdiction (i.e., in which cases could be filed directly with the Supreme Court without first having been heard by a lower federal or state court). There were one or more federal District Courts and/or Circuit Courts in each state, territory, or other geographical region.

Bluebook citation style is used for case names, citations, and jurisdictions.

- "C.C.D." = United States Circuit Court for the District of . . .
  - e.g.,"C.C.D.N.J." = United States Circuit Court for the District of New Jersey
- "D." = United States District Court for the District of . . .
  - e.g.,"D. Mass." = United States District Court for the District of Massachusetts
- "E." = Eastern; "M." = Middle; "N." = Northern; "S." = Southern; "W." = Western
  - e.g.,"C.C.S.D.N.Y." = United States Circuit Court for the Southern District of New York
  - e.g.,"M.D. Ala." = United States District Court for the Middle District of Alabama
- "Ct. Cl." = United States Court of Claims
- The abbreviation of a state's name alone indicates the highest appellate court in that state's judiciary at the time.
  - e.g.,"Pa." = Supreme Court of Pennsylvania
  - e.g.,"Me." = Supreme Judicial Court of Maine

== List of cases in volume 109 U.S. ==
Case Name	Page and year	Opinion of the Court	Concurring opinion(s)	Dissenting opinion(s)	Lower Court	Disposition
Osborne v. Adams County	1 (1883)	Harlan	none	none	C.C.D. Neb.	rehearing denied
Civil Rights Cases	3 (1883)	Bradley	none	Harlan	C.C.D. Kan.	certification
Poindexter v. Greenhow	63 (1883)	Waite	none	none	Va. Hustings Ct.	advancement denied
United States v. Hamilton	63 (1883)	Bradley	none	none	C.C.M.D. Tenn.	dismissed
United States v. Gale	65 (1883)	Bradley	none	none	C.C.N.D. Fla.	certification
Steever v. Rickman	74 (1883)	Waite	none	none	not indicated	conditional dismissal
Oliver, F. and Company v. Rumford Chemical Works	75 (1883)	Blatchford	none	none	C.C.W.D. Tenn.	reversed
Porter v. Lazear	84 (1883)	Gray	none	none	Pa.	affirmed
Laver v. Dennett	90 (1883)	Matthews	none	none	C.C.D. Cal.	affirmed
King v. Gallun	99 (1883)	Woods	none	none	C.C.E.D. Wis.	affirmed
Hewitt v. Campbell	103 (1883)	Harlan	none	none	Sup. Ct. D.C.	affirmed
Green (sic) County v. Conness	104 (1883)	Bradley	none	none	C.C.W.D. Mo.	affirmed
Haskins v. St. Louis and Southeastern Railway	106 (1883)	Waite	none	none	C.C.M.D. Tenn.	dismissed
City of Opelika v. Daniel	108 (1883)	Waite	none	none	C.C.M.D. Ala.	dismissed
The Tornado	110 (1883)	Blatchford	none	none	C.C.D. La.	affirmed
Double Pointed Tack Company v. Two Rivers Manufacturing Company	117 (1883)	Blatchford	none	none	C.C.E.D. Wis.	affirmed
Manhattan Life Insurance Company v. Broughton	121 (1883)	Gray	none	none	C.C.S.D.N.Y.	affirmed
Newman v. Arthur	132 (1883)	Matthews	none	none	C.C.S.D.N.Y.	affirmed
Arthur v. Pastor	139 (1883)	Matthews	none	none	C.C.S.D.N.Y.	affirmed
United States v. Fisher	143 (1883)	Woods	none	none	Ct. Cl.	reversed
United States v. Mitchell	146 (1883)	Woods	none	none	Ct. Cl.	reversed
Hovey v. McDonald	150 (1883)	Bradley	none	none	Sup. Ct. D.C.	affirmed
Louis v. Brown Township	162 (1883)	Miller	none	none	C.C.N.D. Ohio	affirmed
Indiana Southern Railroad Company v. Liverpool, London and Globe Insurance Company	168 (1883)	Waite	none	none	C.C.D. Ind.	affirmed
Guion v. Liverpool, London and Globe Insurance Company	173 (1883)	Waite	none	none	C.C.D. Ind.	dismissed
Ex parte Pennsylvania	174 (1883)	Waite	none	none	E.D. Pa.	prohibition denied
Hunt v. Oliver	177 (1883)	Waite	none	none	C.C.E.D. Mich.	supersedeas granted
Evans v. Brown	180 (1883)	Waite	none	none	C.C.E.D. Nev.	affirmed
Winthrop Iron Company v. Meeker	180 (1883)	Waite	none	none	C.C.W.D. Mich.	dismissal denied
Retzer v. Wood	185 (1883)	Blatchford	none	none	C.C.S.D.N.Y.	reversed
Snyder v. Marks	189 (1883)	Blatchford	none	none	C.C.D. La.	affirmed
Cragin v. Lovell	194 (1883)	Gray	none	none	C.C.D. La.	reversed
United States v. Gibbons	200 (1883)	Matthews	none	none	Ct. Cl.	affirmed
Booth v. Tiernan	205 (1883)	Matthews	none	none	C.C.N.D. Ill.	affirmed
New Orleans National Banking Association v. Adams and Company	211 (1883)	Woods	none	none	C.C.D. La.	affirmed
Matthews v. Densmore	216 (1883)	Miller	none	none	Mich.	reversed
City of New Orleans v. Louisville and Nashville Railroad	221 (1883)	Waite	none	none	C.C.E.D. La.	affirmed
Knox County v. United States ex rel. Harshman	229 (1883)	Waite	none	none	C.C.E.D. Mo.	affirmed
Ex parte Mead	230 (1883)	Waite	none	none	not indicated	mandamus denied
Alabama Gold Life Insurance Company v. Nichols	232 (1883)	Waite	none	none	C.C.E.D. Tex.	dismissed
Lamar v. McCay	235 (1883)	Blatchford	none	none	C.C.S.D.N.Y.	reversed
Arnson v. Murphy	238 (1883)	Matthews	none	none	C.C.S.D.N.Y.	reversed
Louisville and Nashville Railroad v. Palmes	244 (1883)	Matthews	none	none	Fla.	affirmed
United States ex rel. Wilson v. Walker	258 (1883)	Woods	none	none	Sup. Ct. D.C.	affirmed
Meath v. Levee Commissioners of Mississippi	268 (1883)	Woods	none	none	C.C.S.D. Miss.	affirmed
Monongahela National Bank v. Jacobus	275 (1883)	Harlan	none	none	C.C.W.D. Pa.	affirmed
W. R. Grace and Company v. American Central Insurance Company	278 (1883)	Harlan	none	none	C.C.E.D.N.Y.	reversed
Louisiana ex rel. Folsom v. City of New Orleans	285 (1883)	Field	Bradley	Harlan	La.	affirmed
Walsh v. Preston	297 (1883)	Miller	none	Harlan	C.C.W.D. Tex.	reversed
Dubuque and Sioux City Railroad Company v. Des Moines Valley Railroad Company	329 (1883)	Waite	none	none	Iowa	affirmed
Keyes v. United States	336 (1883)	Blatchford	none	none	Ct. Cl.	affirmed
Bernards Township v. Stebbins	341 (1883)	Gray	none	none	C.C.D.N.J.	reversed
Warner v. Connecticut Mutual Life Insurance Company	357 (1883)	Matthews	none	none	C.C.N.D. Ill.	affirmed
Flash v. Conn	371 (1883)	Woods	none	none	C.C.N.D. Fla.	reversed
Terre Haute and Indiana Railway Company v. Struble	381 (1883)	Harlan	none	none	C.C.E.D. Mo.	affirmed
Miller v. City of New York	385 (1883)	Field	none	none	C.C.S.D.N.Y.	affirmed
Memphis Gas Light Co v. Shelby County	398 (1883)	Miller	none	none	Tenn.	affirmed
Gilfillan v. Union Canal Company	401 (1883)	Waite	none	none	Pa.	affirmed
J.A. Fay and Company v. Cordesman	408 (1883)	Blatchford	none	none	C.C.S.D. Ohio	affirmed
Feibelman v. Packard	421 (1883)	Matthews	none	none	C.C.D. La.	affirmed
Smith v. McNeal	426 (1883)	Woods	none	none	C.C.W.D. Tenn.	reversed
Bailey v. United States	432 (1883)	Harlan	none	none	Ct. Cl.	affirmed
Jackson v. Roby	440 (1883)	Field	none	none	C.C.D. Colo.	affirmed
Cunningham v. Macon and Brunswick Railroad Company	446 (1883)	Miller	none	Harlan	C.C.S.D. Ga.	affirmed
J. Leroux and Company v. Hudson	468 (1883)	Blatchford	none	none	C.C.E.D. Mich.	reversed
Schott v. Hudson	477 (1883)	Blatchford	none	none	C.C.E.D. Mich.	reversed
Randall v. Baltimore and O. Railroad Company	478 (1883)	Gray	none	none	C.C.D.W. Va.	affirmed
Ellis v. Davis	485 (1883)	Matthews	none	none	C.C.D. La.	affirmed
Townsend v. Little	504 (1883)	Woods	none	none	Sup. Ct. Terr. Utah	affirmed
United States v. Jones	513 (1883)	Field	none	none	Wis.	affirmed
Thomas v. Brownville, Fort Kearney and Pacific Railroad Company	522 (1883)	Miller	none	none	C.C.D. Neb.	reversed
Canada Southern Railway Company v. Gebhard	527 (1883)	Waite	none	Harlan	C.C.S.D.N.Y.	reversed
Sullivan v. Iron Silver Mining Company	550 (1883)	Gray	none	none	C.C.D. Colo.	reversed
Ex parte Crow Dog	556 (1883)	Matthews	none	none	D. Terr. Dakota	habeas corpus granted
Young v. Duvall	573 (1883)	Harlan	none	none	Sup. Ct. D.C.	affirmed
Providence and New York Steamship Company v. Hill Manufacturing Company	578 (1883)	Bradley	none	Field	Mass.	reversed
Robertson v. Pickrell	608 (1883)	Field	none	none	Sup. Ct. D.C.	affirmed
Sweeney v. United States	618 (1884)	Waite	none	none	Ct. Cl.	affirmed
Cherokee County v. Wilson	621 (1884)	Waite	none	none	C.C.D. Kan.	affirmed
Salamanca Township v. Wilson	627 (1884)	Waite	none	none	C.C.D. Kan.	affirmed
Ex parte Boyer	629 (1884)	Blatchford	none	none	N.D. Ill.	prohibition denied
Estey v. Burdett	633 (1884)	Blatchford	none	none	C.C.D. Vt.	reversed
Clements v. Odorless Excavating Apparatus Company	641 (1884)	Blatchford	none	none	C.C.D. Md.	reversed
Albright v. Emery	650 (1884)	Blatchford	none	none	Sup. Ct. D.C.	affirmed
Winchester and Partridge Manufacturing Company v. Funge	651 (1884)	Blatchford	none	none	Sup. Ct. Terr. Utah	reversed
Wyman v. Halstead	654 (1884)	Gray	none	none	Sup. Ct. D.C.	reversed
Bachman v. Lawson	659 (1884)	Gray	none	none	N.Y. Super. Ct.	affirmed
Bendey v. Townsend	665 (1884)	Gray	none	none	C.C.W.D. Mich.	reversed
Smith v. Greenhow	669 (1884)	Matthews	none	none	C.C.E.D. Va.	reversed
Potomac Steamboat Company v. Upper Potomac Steamboat Company	672 (1884)	Matthews	none	Miller	Sup. Ct. D.C.	affirmed
Chicago and Alton Railroad Company v. Union Rolling Mill Company	702 (1884)	Woods	none	none	C.C.N.D. Ill.	affirmed
Howard v. Carusi	725 (1884)	Woods	none	none	Sup. Ct. D.C.	affirmed
Sherman County v. Simons	735 (1884)	Woods	none	none	C.C.D. Neb.	affirmed
