= Hodges v. United States =

- Supreme Court of the United States

Argued April 23–2, 1906 Decided May 28, 1906
- Full case name: Reuben Hodges v. United States
- Citations: 203 U.S. 1 (more) 27 S. Ct. 6; 51 L. Ed. 65

Case history
- Prior: Conviction in United States District Court for the Eastern District of Arkansas; demurrer overruled by Jacob Trieber

Holding
- The Thirteenth Amendment does not authorize Congress to intervene against racially-motivated interference with labor contracts.

Court membership
- Chief Justice Melville Fuller Associate Justices John M. Harlan · David J. Brewer; Edward D. White · Rufus W. Peckham; Joseph McKenna · Oliver W. Holmes Jr. William R. Day

Case opinions
- Majority: Brewer, joined by Fuller, Brown, White, Peckham, McKenna, Holmes
- Dissent: Harlan, joined by Day

Laws applied
- 18 U.S.C. § 241, 42 U.S.C. § 1981
- Overruled by
- Jones v. Alfred H. Mayer Co., 392 U.S. 409 (1968)

Hodges v. United States, 203 U.S. 1 (1906), was a decision by the United States Supreme Court limiting the power of Congress to make laws under the Thirteenth Amendment. Three white men had been convicted in the Eastern Arkansas District Court for conspiring against black sawmill workers.

The statute that was used to convict the men prohibits conspiracy to deprive American citizens of their constitutional liberties, including the right to make contracts. The Supreme Court overturned the conviction, holding that Congress did not have the right to intervene against racially motivated interference with labor contracts.

== District Courts ==
On 8 May 1903, Arkansas Attorney General William G. Whipple wrote to U.S. Attorney General Philander C. Knox to announce (and request funding for) investigation of a “white-capping” case. Whipple wrote that an “inferior class of white men feeling themselves unable to compete with colored tenants combined to drive them out of the country.” Knox approved the investigation, responding that the Department of Justice was “alive to the aggressive attitude of such organized bands as those to which you refer, and determined to meet such emergencies with proper and decisive action”.

By October 1903, a grand jury had indicted two groups of White men accused of white-capping. The first case, filed as United States v. Morris, involved a group of 11 men accused of targeting sharecroppers. The second, United States v. Maples, accused 15 men of intimidating Black workers at a lumber mill in Whitehall, Arkansas. The case against them was made primarily under two statutes of the U.S. Code.

§1977 gives “all persons” in the U.S. the same right to make contracts “as is enjoyed by white citizens” :

All persons within the jurisdiction of the United States shall have the same right in every state and territory to make and enforce contracts, to sue, be parties, give evidence, and to the full and equal benefit of all laws and proceedings for the security of persons and property as is enjoyed by white citizens, and shall be subject to like punishment, pains, penalties, taxes, licenses, and exactions of every kind, and to no other.

§5508, originating with the Civil Rights Act of 1866 and modified by the Enforcement Act of 1870, outlaws conspiracy to deprive citizens of their Constitutional freedoms:

SEC. 5508. If two or more persons conspire to injure, oppress, threaten, or intimidate any citizen in the free exercise or enjoyment of any right or privilege secured to him by the Constitution or laws of the United States, or because of his having so exercised the same; or if two or more persons go in disguise on the highway, or on the premises of another, with intent to prevent or hinder his free exercise or enjoyment of any right or privilege so secured, they shall be fined not more than five thousand dollars and imprisoned not more than ten years, and shall, moreover, be thereafter ineligible to any office or place of honor, profit or trust created by the Constitution or laws of the United States.

The defendants filed demurrers arguing that these laws infringed on states' rights. These were overruled by Judge Jacob Trieber in federal district court. Trieber acknowledged that, particularly in light of the Civil Rights Cases (1883), the Fourteenth Amendment could only be invoked to redress inequality of state actors. Citing the decision of Judge Noah Swayne in U. S. v. Rhodes (1866), Trieber invoked the Thirteenth Amendment and held that the right to make contracts was a “fundamental” right.

The state could obtain no conviction in Morris, unable to produce solid evidence even though, in Whipple's words, “the jurors, as well as the Court, were convinced we had indicted the right men”. Of the 15 accused in Maples, the jury convicted 3: William Clampit, Wash McKinney, and Reuben Hodges. The three men convicted in Morris appealed their case (now Hodges v. United States), which the Supreme Court accepted in March 1904.

== Supreme Court ==
Lawyers for Clampit, McKinney, and Hodges argued that the intended effect of the Thirteenth Amendment had been completed with emancipation and furthermore that no federally recognized right to make contracts existed at the time of its adoption. The Department of Justice, now led by Attorney General William Henry Moody (a future Supreme Court justice), defended the statutes. Moody acknowledged the “state actor” limitation to the Fourteenth Amendment and focused, like Trieber, on the Thirteenth Amendment. Moody argued that the Thirteenth Amendment guarantees “practical freedom”—including the right to make a contract, work, and be compensated.

=== Oral arguments ===
In oral arguments, Justice David Josiah Brewer asked whether all Black workers enjoyed special protections because of the Thirteenth Amendment. Moody responded that Black and White workers enjoyed the same rights and that the Thirteenth Amendment only applied if workers were targeted because they were Black. In fact, Moody argued that any type of racial hatred might be included. Justice William R. Day replied: “This amendment everybody supposed was intended to protect the colored race. Other races were never thought of at all.” To which said Moody:

I can easily rest this case upon the fact that the persons injured were of the colored race, and therefore peculiarly within the protection of the thirteenth amendment. But I have not been able to satisfy my mind that this amendment makes a permanent distinction between negroes and persons of other races. Its benefits extend to all persons of all races.

Moody stated later in the arguments: “Concerted action against another person, on account of his race, to deprive them of one of the essential rights to freedom, the right to labor, is a violation of the thirteenth amendment.”

Brewer raised questions about this position based on the precedent it might set for labor law. He asked:

One of another race – against any person of another race – wouldn’t the action of labor organizations in forbidding any person to labor unless he was a member of their organizations be depriving him of liberty? […]

Take the case of an Irishman who strikes an Italian working on the railroad. A body of Irish say, We do not like ‘Dagos’ and will not work with them, and they drive them off; they wouldn’t do that if they were Irish. [...] The Irishman goes into a bar room and he sees an Italian there and knocks him down. Would that be a violation under your theory?

Moody replied, “I wouldn't go that far.”

Moody argued finally that the “war of races” now encompassed the whole nation, and that:

if the Negro who is in our midst can be denied the right to work and must live on the outskirts of civilization, he will become more dangerous than the wild beasts, because he has a higher intelligence than the most intelligent beast. He will become an outcast lurking about the borders and living by depredation.

The Court ruled 7–2 for Hodges, holding the federal statutes unconstitutional and overruling the Arkansas convictions.

=== Majority opinion ===
The majority opinion, authored by Brewer, maintained that the original constitution had intended for state governments to make contract law. According to the Tenth Amendment, those powers not explicitly assigned to the federal government belong to the states. Brewer quoted the Thirteenth Amendment in full and wrote: “The meaning of this is as clear as language can make it.” Brewer proceeded to give a definition of “slavery” from Webster's Dictionary.

Brewer interpreted the Thirteenth Amendment narrowly, in terms of legal rights, arguing that broad application led down a slippery slope to complete federal power. Responding to certain statements from the Department of Justice's brief, Brewer wrote:

The logic of this concession points irresistibly to the contention that the Thirteenth Amendment operates only to protect the African race. This is evident from the fact that nowhere in the record does it appear that the parties charged to have been wronged by the defendants had ever been themselves slaves, or were the descendants of slaves. They took no more from the Amendment than any other citizens of the United States. But if, as we have seen, that denounces a condition possible for all races and all individuals, then a like wrong perpetrated by white men upon a Chinese, or by black men upon a white man, or by any men upon any man on account of his race, would come within the jurisdiction of Congress, and that protection of individual rights which, prior to the Thirteenth Amendment, was unquestionably within the jurisdiction solely of the states, would, by virtue of that Amendment, be transferred to the nation, and subject to the legislation of Congress.

Brewer affirmed a contrary interpretation, that the Amendment “is the denunciation of a condition, and not a declaration in favor of a particular people. It reaches every race and every individual, and if in any respect it commits one race to the nation, it commits every race and every individual thereof.” Brewer also argued that not every “badge of slavery” qualified for federal intervention. Brewer cited an enforcement regime for the deportation of Chinese workers, arguing that because Chinese people were not a slave class in the U.S., requiring them to carry authorization certificates did not violate the Thirteenth Amendment:

But that it was not the intent of the Amendment to denounce every act done to an individual which was wrong if done to a free man, and yet justified in a condition of slavery, and to give authority to Congress to enforce such denunciation, consider the legislation in respect to the Chinese. In slave times, in the slave states, not infrequently every free negro was required to carry with him a copy of a judicial decree or other evidence of his right to freedom or be subject to arrest. That was one of the incidents or badges of slavery. By the Act of May 5, 1892, Congress required all Chinese laborers within the limits of the United States to apply for a certificate, and anyone who, after one year from the passage of the act, should be found within the jurisdiction of the United States without such certificate might be arrested and deported. In Fong Yue Ting v. United States, 149 U. S. 698, the validity of the Chinese deportation act was presented, elaborately argued, and fully considered by this Court. While there was a division of opinion, yet at no time during the progress of the litigation, and by no individual, counsel, or court connected with it was it suggested that the requiring of such a certificate was evidence of a condition of slavery, or prohibited by the Thirteenth Amendment.

Finally, Brewer wrote that Blacks deserved no special privileges because they enjoyed greater freedom as citizens:

One thing more: at the close of the Civil War, when the problem of the emancipated slaves was before the nation, it might have left them in a condition of alienage, or established them as wards of the government, like the Indian tribes, and thus retained for the nation jurisdiction over them, or it might, as it did, give them citizenship. It chose the latter. By the Fourteenth Amendment, it made citizens of all born within the limits of the United States and subject to its jurisdiction. By the Fifteenth, it prohibited any state from denying the right of suffrage on account of race, color, or previous condition of servitude, and by the Thirteenth, it forbade slavery or involuntary servitude anywhere within the limits of the land. Whether this was or was not the wiser way to deal with the great problem is not a matter for the courts to consider. It is for us to accept the decision, which declined to constitute them wards of the nation or leave them in a condition of alienage where they would be subject to the jurisdiction of Congress, but gave them citizenship, doubtless believing that thereby, in the long run, their best interests would be subserved, they taking their chances with other citizens in the states where they should make their homes.

As precedent, Brewer's decision cited only The Slaughter-House Cases.

=== Dissenting opinion ===
Justice John Marshall Harlan, a long-time supporter of broad Thirteenth Amendment powers, wrote the dissenting opinion, joined by Justice William R. Day. (The document itself was three times longer than the statement of Brewer's majority decision.) Harlan insisted that the Amendment empowered Congress not only to target legal slavery directly, but additionally:

... may make it impossible that any of its incidents or badges should exist or be enforced in any state or territory of the United States. It therefore became competent for Congress, under the Thirteenth Amendment, to make the establishing of slavery, as well as all attempts, whether in the form of a conspiracy or otherwise, to subject anyone to the badges or incidents of slavery offenses against the United States, punishable by fine or imprisonment or both.

And therefore: “legislation making it an offense against the United States to conspire to injure or intimidate a citizen in the free exercise of any right secured by the Constitution is broad enough to embrace a conspiracy of the kind charged in the present indictment.”

Harlan cited U. S. v. Cruikshank, which affirmed guarantees by the Civil Rights Act of 1866 of equal rights to make contracts. Harlan quoted at length from Bradley's opinion in Cruikshank, which suggested that Congress must affirmatively protect the right to make contracts (and could take action against racial segregation within economic activity):

Congress therefore acquired the power not only to legislate for the eradication of slavery, but the power to give full effect to this bestowment of liberty on these millions of people. All this it essayed to do by the civil rights bill passed April 9, 1866, 14 Stat. 27, by which it was declared that all persons born in the United States, and not subject to a foreign power (except Indians, not taxed), should be citizens of the United States, and that such citizens, of every race and color, without any regard to any previous condition of slavery or involuntary servitude, should have the same right, in every state and territory, to make and enforce contracts, to sue, be parties, and give evidence to inherit, purchase, lease, sell, hold, and convey real and personal property, and to full and equal benefit of all laws and proceedings for the security of persons and property, as is enjoyed by white citizens, and should be subject to like punishment, pains, and penalties, and to none other, any law, etc., to the contrary notwithstanding. [...]

If in a community or neighborhood composed principally of whites, a citizen of African descent, or of the Indian race, not within the exception of the Amendment, should propose to lease and cultivate a farm, and a combination should be formed to expel him and prevent him from the accomplishment of his purpose on account of his race or color, it cannot be doubted that this would be a case within the power of Congress to remedy and redress.

Citing the Civil Rights Cases and Clyatt v. U. S., Harlan's dissent reaffirmed the Thirteenth Amendment's unique status (particularly compared to the Fourteenth Amendment) as permitting Congressional intervention directly, even when state laws do not formally discriminate.

== Legacy ==
Hodges has been cited as a significant moment in the limitation of Thirteenth Amendment powers and in the denial of civil rights to Southern Blacks.

President Theodore Roosevelt appointed Moody to the Supreme Court in December 1906.

The Supreme Court overturned Hodges in Jones v. Alfred H. Mayer Co. (1968).

== Analysis ==
Pamela S. Karlan (law professor at Stanford) suggests in a 2005 law review that state prosecution of white-capping took place mostly for economic reasons—because intimidation of Black workers disrupted the operation of White-owned businesses. When the case entered the Supreme Court, the focus shifted entirely to the scope of Congressional power and obligation under the Thirteenth Amendment. Karlan argues that the Court's decision reflects the intense effort that would indeed be required to address the legacy of slavery through legislation. Because slavery-like conditions were indeed prevalent in the Jim Crow South: “To muster the entire power of the federal government to deal with the Whitehall situation would mean deciding that federal power was to be used in the ordinary course of events.”

In her assessment, the decision represents an attempt to ignore the legacy produced by centuries of enslavement, portraying the racial animosity of the white-cappers as no different from anti-immigrant xenophobia. Karlan responds to Brewer's statement that “nowhere in the record does it appear” that the Black workers had been enslaved or were descended from slaves:

Essentially, the Court’s disingenuous statement about the record in Hodges rests on its refusal to presume that all animus against blacks stemmed from their past condition of slavery. In an age when society disliked immigrants for being different and bandied about ideas of inherent racial superiority, such a dissociation has a certain logic. Hodges and his compatriots might dislike blacks and wish to prevent them from exercising their right to contract without any thought to those black workers’ previous condition of enslavement.

Thus, the Court pretended that “the problems of blacks” were “already solved”. Karlan's article, published in a journal issue dedicated to Lochner v. New York, speculates about the apparent divergence between Hodges and Lochner. She asks: “How could it be that freedom of contract was so fundamental a liberty that it was protected against state infringement by the Fourteenth Amendment but was not a right of free persons that could be protected against private impairment by the Thirteenth?” The Court ruled on Fourteenth Amendment grounds in Lochner that New York could not constitutionally prevent workers from making contracts to work for more than 10 hours per day. Karlan argues that the difference results from the different treatment of formal rights and practical rights—i.e., de jure versus de facto realities.

Karlan also suggests basic racial and economic biases, noting that Brewer had also written the majority opinion for In re Debs—finding in the latter case that a mass strike disrupting the railroad system did warrant federal intervention under the Commerce Clause. She writes: “the outcome in Hodges reflected the Court’s view that the problems of eight black men were not as significant or compelling as those surrounding eighty thousand strikers".

Karlan notes Arkansas Attorney General Whipple's satisfaction at having jailed the defendants for a year's worth of legal proceedings: “an early version of the notion that the process is the punishment.”

David Bernstein (law professor at George Mason) adds to Karlan's analysis of the original economic motivation behind the case: “this is just one example of a much broader phenomenon; during the Lochner era, the interests of white industrialists and black workers often converged in opposition to the racially exclusionary policies and attitudes of working class whites.” Following the line of discussion between Brewer and Moody, he argues that the Court might have perceived a broad interpretation as threatening to “the very existence of craft unions”. Bernstein suggests that Harlan and Day were able to recommend broader Thirteenth Amendment powers because they limited its application to Blacks.

Other commentators emphasize the affirmative Thirteenth Amendment protection applied by the Hodges majority to people of all races: “Slavery or involuntary servitude of the Chinese, of the Italian, of the Anglo-Saxon, are as much within its compass as slavery or involuntary servitude of the African.”
