= Enforcement Acts =

Laws aiming to combat resistance to reconstruction after the US Civil War

The Enforcement Acts were three bills that were passed by the United States Congress between 1870 and 1871. They were criminal codes that protected African Americans' rights to vote, to hold office, to serve on juries, and receive equal protection of laws. Passed under the presidency of Ulysses S. Grant, the laws also allowed the federal government to intervene when states did not act to protect these rights. The acts passed following the ratification of the Fourteenth Amendment to the US Constitution, which gave full citizenship to anyone born in the United States or freed slaves, and the Fifteenth Amendment, which banned racial discrimination in voting.

At the time, the lives of all newly freed slaves, as well as their political and economic rights, were being threatened. This threat led to the creation of the Enforcement Acts.

== Goal ==
The main goal in creating these acts was to improve conditions for black people and freed slaves. The main target was the Ku Klux Klan, a white supremacy organization, which was targeting Black people, and later other groups. Although this act was meant to fight the KKK and help black people and freedmen, many states were reluctant to take such relatively extreme actions, for several reasons. Some politicians at the state and federal levels were either members of the Klan, or did not have enough strength to fight the Klan. Another goal of these acts was to achieve national unity, by creating a country where all races were considered equal under the law.

== Regulations of the Acts ==
The Enforcement Acts did many things to help freedmen. The main purpose under the act was the prohibited use of violence or any form of intimidation to prevent the freedmen from voting and accept them that right. There were many provisions placed under the act, many with serious consequences. The Enforcement Acts were created as part of the Reconstruction era following the American Civil War. To allow full national unity, all citizens must be denied and viewed equally, with violence prohibited.

=== Enforcement Act of 1870 ===
The Enforcement Act of 1870 prohibited discrimination by state officials in voter registration on the basis of race, color, or previous condition of servitude. It established penalties for interfering with a person's right to vote and gave federal courts the power to enforce the act.

The act also authorized the president to employ the use of the army to uphold the act and the use of federal marshals to bring charges against offenders for election fraud, the bribery or intimidation of voters, and conspiracies to prevent citizens from exercising their constitutional rights.

The act banned the use of terror, force or bribery to prevent people from voting because of their race. Other laws banned the KKK entirely. Hundreds of KKK members were arrested and tried as common criminals and terrorists. The first Klan was all but eradicated within a year of federal prosecution.

=== Enforcement Act of 1871 ===
The Second Enforcement Act of 1871 (formally, "an Act to enforce the rights of citizens of the United States to vote in the several states of this union"), permitted federal oversight of local and state elections if any two citizens in a town with more than twenty-thousand inhabitants desired it.

The Enforcement Act of 1871 (second act) and the Civil Rights Act of 1875 are very similar to the original act as they all have the same goal, but revised the first act with the intention of being more effective. The Act of 1871 has more severe punishments with larger fines for disregarding the regulations, and the prison sentences vary in length. The final act, and the most effective, was also a revision. Although the fines lowered again, and the prison sentences remained approximately the same, this act was the best enforced by the government.

=== Ku Klux Klan Act ===
The Enforcement Act of 1871, the third Enforcement Act passed by Congress and also known as the Ku Klux Klan Act (formally, "An Act to enforce the Provisions of the Fourteenth Amendment to the Constitution of the United States, and for other Purposes"), made state officials liable in federal court for depriving anyone of their civil rights or the equal protection of the laws. It further made a number of the KKK's intimidation tactics into federal offenses, authorized the president to call out the militia to suppress conspiracies against the operation of the federal government, and prohibited those suspected of complicity in such conspiracies to serve on juries related to the Klan's activities. The Act also authorized the president to suspend the writ of habeas corpus if violence rendered efforts to suppress the Klan ineffective. It was passed at the request of Ulysses S. Grant.

== Aftermath ==
As a response to the act, Klansmen in South Carolina were put on trial in front of juries made up of mainly African Americans. Amos T. Akerman was largely involved with the prosecutions of the Klansmen. He worked to make America aware of Klan violence and how much of a problem it was becoming. His work led to trials and to jail sentences of a few hundred Klan members. Many others who were put on trial either fled or were only given a warning. By 1872, the Klan as an organization had been officially broken.

The Enforcement Acts were a series of acts, but it was not until the Ku Klux Klan Act of 1871, the third Enforcement Act, that their regulations to protect black Americans, and to enforce the Fourteenth and Fifteenth Amendment to the United States Constitution were appreciably enforced and followed. It was only after the creation of the third Enforcement Act that trials were conducted, and perpetrators were convicted for any crimes they had committed in violation of the Enforcement Acts.

=== Judicial interpretations ===
After the Colfax massacre in Louisiana, the federal government brought a civil rights case against nine men (out of 97 indicted) who were accused of paramilitary activity intended to stop black people from voting. In United States v. Cruikshank (1876), the Court ruled that the federal government did not have the authority to prosecute the men because the Fourteenth and Fifteenth Amendments provide only for redress against state actors. However, in Ex Parte Yarbrough (1884) the Court allowed individuals who were not state actors to be prosecuted because Article I Section 4 of the Constitution gives Congress the power to regulate federal elections.

In Hodges v. United States (1906), the Court addressed a possible Thirteenth Amendment rationale for the Enforcement Acts, and found that the federal government did not have the authority to punish a group of men for interfering with black workers through whitecapping. Hodges v. United States would be overruled in Jones v. Alfred H. Mayer Co. some 50 years later, stating for the first time since Reconstruction that the federal government could criminalize racist acts by private actors.

=== Later uses ===
In 1911, Dr. David Amoss was tried in Hopkensville, Kentucky under the Enforcement Act for his involvement with a vigilaintee group known as the Night Riders, which was explicitly modeled after the Klan, during the Black Patch Tobacco War. He was aquitted by the jury, which included many former Night Riders.

In 1964, the United States Department of Justice charged eighteen individuals under the Enforcement Act of 1870, with conspiring to deprive Michael Schwerner, James Chaney, and Andrew Goodman of their civil rights by murder because Mississippi officials refused to prosecute their killers for murder, a state crime. While the Supreme Court limited the Act, they did not fully repeal it. The resulting case, United States v. Price, would stand because state actors were involved.

On August 1, 2023, the Justice Department charged former president Donald Trump under the Enforcement Act of 1870, now 18 U.S.C. 241, in United States v. Donald Trump over his attempts to overturn the 2020 United States presidential election.

== See also ==
- Civil Rights Act of 1866
- Civil Rights Act of 1875
