= Hurtado v. California =

- Supreme Court of the United States

Argued January 22–23, 1884 Decided March 3, 1884
- Full case name: Joseph Hurtado v. People of California
- Citations: 110 U.S. 516 (more) 4 S. Ct. 111; 28 L. Ed. 232; 1884 U.S. LEXIS 1716

Case history
- Prior: In error to the Supreme Court of California

Holding
- The words "due process of law" in the Fourteenth Amendment to the US Constitution do not necessarily require an indictment by a grand jury in a prosecution by a state for murder.

Court membership
- Chief Justice Morrison Waite Associate Justices Samuel F. Miller · Stephen J. Field; Joseph P. Bradley · John M. Harlan; William B. Woods · Stanley Matthews; Horace Gray · Samuel Blatchford

Case opinions
- Majority: Matthews, joined by Waite, Miller, Bradley, Woods, Gray, Blatchford
- Dissent: Harlan
- Field took no part in the consideration or decision of the case.

Laws applied
- Fifth and Fourteenth Amendments to the U.S. Constitution; Article I, Section 8, to the California State Constitution

Hurtado v. California, 110 U.S. 516 (1884), was a landmark case decided by the United States Supreme Court that allowed state governments, as distinguished from the federal government, to avoid using grand juries in criminal prosecutions.

== Background ==
Joseph Hurtado discovered that his wife, Susie, was having an affair with their friend, José Antonio Estuardo. After measures that Hurtado took to put an end to the affair, such as temporarily sending his wife away to live with her parents and then assaulting Estuardo in a bar after his wife returned and the affair resumed, proved futile, Hurtado fatally shot Estuardo. Hurtado was arrested for the crime but was not indicted by a grand jury.

According to the California State Constitution at the time, "Offenses heretofore required to be prosecuted by indictment, shall be prosecuted by information, after examination and commitment by a magistrate, or by indictment, with or without such examination and commitment, as may be prescribed by law. A grand jury shall be drawn and summoned at least once a year in each county."

The Sacramento County judge examined the information and determined that Hurtado should be brought to trial. Hurtado was tried, convicted of murder, and sentenced to death. At issue was whether or not the Fourteenth Amendment's Due Process Clause extended the Fifth Amendment's Indictment Clause requiring indictment by grand jury to the states.

The following questions were presented:

- Does a state criminal proceeding based on an information rather than a grand jury indictment violate the Fourteenth Amendment's due process clause?
- Is a grand jury indictment required by the Fifth Amendment applicable to state criminal trials via the Fourteenth Amendment?

== Decision ==
The Supreme Court ruled 7-1 that Hurtado's due process right was not violated by denial of a grand jury hearing and that the Fourteenth Amendment was not intended to work retroactively to apply the Fifth Amendment to state criminal trials.

Writing for the majority, Justice Matthews stated that the states should be free to construct their own laws without infringement and that the Fourteenth Amendment was not intended to guarantee the right of a grand jury because it would then have been specifically referenced. His opinion also concluded that Hurtado's due process right was not violated, as an information is "merely a preliminary proceeding and can result in no final judgment." He further concluded that Hurtado still received a fair trial.

== Dissenting opinion ==
However, Justice Harlan presented a lone dissent, a learned disquisition on the history and meaning of "due process of law" that included quotes of many of the great jurists. "Blackstone says: 'But to find a bill there must be at least twelve of the jury agree; for, so tender is the law of England of the lives of the subjects, that no man can be convicted at the suit of the king of any capital offense, unless by a unanimous voice of twenty-four of his equals and neighbors; that is, by twelve at least of the grand jury, in the first place, assenting to the accusation, and afterwards by the whole petit jury of twelve more finding him guilty upon his trial.'" Also, "'But these informations (of every kind) are confined by the constitutional law to mere misdemeanors only; for, wherever any capital offense is charged, the same law requires that the accusation be warranted by the oath of twelve men before the party shall be put to answer it.' Id. 309." He cited Edward Coke, who held that "in capital cases, informations are not allowed by that law [of the land], and was not due process of law."

== Aftermath ==
It has been on the basis of the decision that many states have abandoned the requirement for grand juries, usually replacing them with informations and a preliminary hearing before a judge or the discretion of the prosecutor. However, as Justice Harlan had written, "one of the peculiar benefits of the grand-jury system, as it exists in this country, is that it is composed, as a general rule, of private persons who do not hold office at the will of the government, or at the will of voters."

Critics contend that by abandoning the grand jury as originally conceived, the rights of the accused are less well-protected, resulting in more miscarriages of justice. The grand jury has been criticized, however, as ineffective in protecting the rights of the accused. In the words of Sol Wachtler, a former Chief Judge of the New York Court of Appeals, a grand jury would indict a ham sandwich if the prosecutor asked it to do so.

The decision was "reaffirmed in numerous cases" in the early 20th century. Even during the Supreme Court's drastic modification of its incorporation doctrine in the 1950s and '60s, there was no serious movement to overrule Hurtado, and it in fact was "the only guarantee that appeared unlikely to be incorporated."

== See also ==
- List of United States Supreme Court cases, volume 110
