= Second Enforcement Act =

United States federal law

Enforcement Act of 1871
- Long title: An Act to amend an Act approved May thirty-one, eighteen hundred and seventy, entitled "An Act to enforce the Rights of Citizens of the United States to vote in several States of this Union, and for other Purposes."
- Nicknames: Civil Rights Act of 1871, Second Ku Klux Klan Act
- Enacted by: the 41st United States Congress

Citations
- Statutes at Large: 16 Stat. 433–440

Codification
- Acts amended: Enforcement Act of 1870

Legislative history
- Introduced in the House as H.R. 2634 by John C. Churchill (R–NY) on January 9, 1871; Committee consideration by House Judiciary; Passed the House on February 15, 1871 (144 - 64); Passed the Senate on February 24, 1871 (39 - 10); Signed into law by President Ulysses S. Grant on February 28, 1871

The Second Enforcement Act of 1871, sometimes called the Civil Rights Act of 1871 or the Second Ku Klux Klan Act, was a United States federal law. The act was the second of three Enforcement Acts passed by the United States Congress from 1870 to 1871 during the Reconstruction Era to combat attacks on the voting rights of African Americans from groups like the Ku Klux Klan.

== Legislative history ==
Republican Representative John C. Churchill from New York introduced his bill H.R. 2634 in the 41st United States Congress. The bill was passed by Congress on February 15th, 1871, and signed into law by United States President Ulysses S. Grant on February 28, 1871.

== Legislative breakdown ==
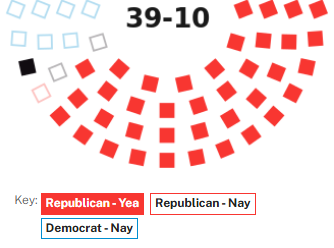
The Senate vote breakdown by party of the Enforcement Act of 1971.

H.R. 2634 was brought to a floor vote in the chambers of the US House on February 15, 1871. Three political parties were present to vote on the motion to pass H.R. 2634, the Second Enforcement Act of 1871. The Republican Party voted 143 in favor, 3 against. The Democratic Party voted 0 in favor, 58 against. And the Conservative Party voted 1 in favor, 3 against. 32 members did not vote. It was brought to a floor vote in the chambers of the US Senate on February 24, 1871. Three political parties were present. Republicans voted 38 in favor, 1 against. Democrats voted 0 in favor, 7 against. and Liberal Republicans voted 0 in favor, 0 against. 24 members did not vote. 1 Aye and 2 Nay votes were recorded, but unattributed to a party.

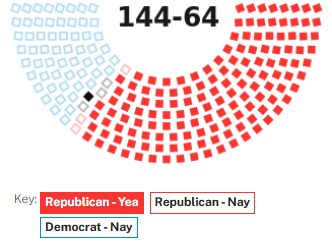
The House vote breakdown by party of The Enforcement Act of 1871.
