= United States v. Jones (1883) =

- Supreme Court of the United States

Argued October 11, 1883 Decided December 10, 1883
- Full case name: United States v. Jones Administrator, and Others
- Citations: 109 U.S. 513 (more) 3 S. Ct. 346; 27 L. Ed. 1015

Holding
- The power to take private property for public uses, in the exercise of the right of eminent domain, is an incident of sovereignty, belonging to every independent government and requiring no constitutional recognition, and it exists in the government of the United States. Affirmed opinion of the Supreme Court of Wisconsin.

Court membership
- Chief Justice Morrison Waite Associate Justices Samuel F. Miller · Stephen J. Field; Joseph P. Bradley · John M. Harlan; William B. Woods · Stanley Matthews; Horace Gray · Samuel Blatchford

Case opinion
- Majority: Field, joined by unanimous

United States v. Jones, 109 U.S. 513 (1883), is an important decision by the United States Supreme Court which provides the power to take private property for public uses, in the exercise of the right of eminent domain, to the government of the United States. However, once the government exercises of the right of eminent domain and after a fair determination of the amount of compensation, any unforeseen damage to the property as a result of activities prior to the purchase but realized only afterwards is to be compensated by the government per any legislative decree.

== Background ==
In the mid-1800s, there were efforts to establish a navigable shipping route between Lake Michigan and the Mississippi River. One of those efforts was to improve navigation on the Fox and Wisconsin Rivers and in constructing a canal to unite the rivers. In 1846, the United States government ceded land to the State of Wisconsin for the purpose of implementing this plan. The project was awarded to a corporation known as the Green Bay and Mississippi Canal Company. There were several delays in the project and construction of several of the dams were plagued with issues. In 1870, the government had grown weary of the delays and, in July, 1870, the United States Congress passed an act "for the improvement of water communication between the Mississippi River and Lake Michigan by the Wisconsin and Fox Rivers;" which authorized the government to exercise of the right of eminent domain to take back the property ceded in 1846, and any other property necessary to complete the project.

The amount of compensation for the land to be claimed by its eminent domain was determined and the property became the property of the US government in 1872. After 1872, severe floods destroyed property on lands which had not been claimed by the US government. These floods were a result of the construction of dams by the Green Bay and Mississippi Canal Company prior to United States ascertaining the property. The property owners sued the United States government for damages caused by the floods and the case was heard in Wisconsin state courts.

The case was set for a jury trial. The United States objected to the case claiming the state court had no jurisdiction to try a cause in which the United States were a party. These objections were overruled and the trial resulted in a verdict for the property owners for $10,000. The government appealed to the Wisconsin Supreme Court, where the verdict was affirmed. Following the decision by the Wisconsin Supreme Court, the US government appealed to the United States Supreme Court.

== Decision ==
The case was submitted to the United States Supreme Court on October 11, 1883, and Justice Stephen Johnson Field delivered the unanimous opinion of the Court which affirmed the Wisconsin Supreme Court.

The Court based its opinion on a bill which was passed by Congress and approved on March 3, 1875, which provides that the value of any property ascertained through the right of eminent domain will be determined by the laws of the State wherein the property lay. The provisions of the act of 1875, with reference to the property overflowed by dams constructed in the improvement of the navigation of Fox and Wisconsin rivers, that the compensation to be made shall be ascertained in the mode and manner prescribed by the laws of the State, and constitute a sufficient waiver of the United States general immunity of process. Thus, the Court determined that the US government must provide compensation according to the laws of Wisconsin.

In 1874, the Wisconsin Legislature passed a law providing for ascertaining the compensation to be made for damages caused to lands by their being overflowed or otherwise injured or taken by the United States. This Wisconsin law provides that the US government is liable for any damages resulting from the property. The Court determined that this law applied to the US government. Therefore, the Court determined that the proceeding in the Wisconsin state courts were valid and upheld the verdict by the jury which awarded the property owners compensation from the US government.

== Significance ==
Federal Courts have cited the Jones decision in over 600 decisions as a guideline on applying the US government power and obligation under the Fifth Amendment to take private property for public uses, generally termed the right of eminent domain. It has also been cited to stress a common lesson, caveat emptor or “let the buyer beware”, even when the government is the buyer.

The Fox–Wisconsin Waterway was completed in 1876, but after the completion of the Illinois and Michigan Canal. As the Illinois and Michigan Canal became the primary passageway between Lake Michigan and the Mississippi River, use of the Fox–Wisconsin Waterway was never substantial and it slowly died out, and by 1951, the passage was closed.
