= List of United States Supreme Court cases, volume 110 =

Supreme Court of the United States
- Interactive map of Supreme Court of the United States
- 38°53′26″N 77°00′16″W
- Established: March 4, 1789; 236 years ago
- Location: Washington, D.C.
- Coordinates: 38°53′26″N 77°00′16″W
- Composition method: Presidential nomination with Senate confirmation
- Authorised by: Constitution of the United States, Art. III, § 1
- Judge term length: life tenure, subject to impeachment and removal
- Number of positions: 9 (by statute)
- Website: supremecourt.gov

This is a list of cases reported in volume 110 of United States Reports, decided by the Supreme Court of the United States in 1884.

== Justices of the Supreme Court at the time of volume 110 U.S. ==
The Supreme Court is established by Article III, Section 1 of the Constitution of the United States, which says: "The judicial Power of the United States, shall be vested in one supreme Court . . .". The size of the Court is not specified; the Constitution leaves it to Congress to set the number of justices. Under the Judiciary Act of 1789 Congress originally fixed the number of justices at six (one chief justice and five associate justices). Since 1789 Congress has varied the size of the Court from six to seven, nine, ten, and back to nine justices (always including one chief justice).

When the cases in volume 110 U.S. were decided the Court comprised the following nine members:

Portrait	Justice	Office	Home State	Succeeded	Date confirmed by the Senate (Vote)	Tenure on Supreme Court
	Morrison Waite	Chief Justice	Ohio	Salmon P. Chase	January 21, 1874 (63–0)	March 4, 1874 – March 23, 1888 (Died)
	Samuel Freeman Miller	Associate Justice	Iowa	Peter Vivian Daniel	July 16, 1862 (Acclamation)	July 21, 1862 – October 13, 1890 (Died)
	Stephen Johnson Field	Associate Justice	California	newly created seat	March 10, 1863 (Acclamation)	May 10, 1863 – December 1, 1897 (Retired)
	Joseph P. Bradley	Associate Justice	New Jersey	newly created seat	March 21, 1870 (46–9)	March 23, 1870 – January 22, 1892 (Died)
	John Marshall Harlan	Associate Justice	Kentucky	David Davis	November 29, 1877 (Acclamation)	December 10, 1877 – October 14, 1911 (Died)
	William Burnham Woods	Associate Justice	Georgia	William Strong	December 21, 1880 (39–8)	January 5, 1881 – May 14, 1887 (Died)
	Stanley Matthews	Associate Justice	Ohio	Noah Haynes Swayne	May 12, 1881 (24–23)	May 17, 1881 – March 22, 1889 (Died)
	Horace Gray	Associate Justice	Massachusetts	Nathan Clifford	December 20, 1881 (51–5)	January 9, 1882 – September 15, 1902 (Died)
	Samuel Blatchford	Associate Justice	New York	Ward Hunt	March 22, 1882 (Acclamation)	April 3, 1882 – July 7, 1893 (Died)

== Notable Cases in 110 U.S. ==
=== Kellogg Bridge Co. v. Hamilton ===
Kellogg Bridge Company v. Hamilton, 110 U.S. 108 (1884), involved an Implied warranty of fitness for a particular purpose lawsuit. The Supreme Court held that under the circumstances of this case (shoddy construction of a bridge), the buyer had the right to rely and necessarily relied on the judgment of the seller and not upon his own. In ordinary circumstances, the buyer has the opportunity to inspect the article sold and the seller is not the maker, so they stand on equal grounds of ignorance. But when the seller is the manufacturer, the fair presumption is that it understands the process of manufacture and knows of any latent defect caused by such process which reasonable diligence might have prevented.

=== Hurtado v. California ===
In Hurtado v. California, 110 U.S. 516 (1884), the Supreme Court allowed state governments, as distinguished from the federal government, to avoid using grand juries in criminal prosecutions. The Court ruled that Hurtado, who was convicted of murder and sentenced to death, was not deprived of due process by lack of a grand jury hearing.

== Citation style ==
Under the Judiciary Act of 1789 the federal court structure at the time comprised District Courts, which had general trial jurisdiction; Circuit Courts, which had mixed trial and appellate (from the US District Courts) jurisdiction; and the United States Supreme Court, which had appellate jurisdiction over the federal District and Circuit courts—and for certain issues over state courts. The Supreme Court also had limited original jurisdiction (i.e., in which cases could be filed directly with the Supreme Court without first having been heard by a lower federal or state court). There were one or more federal District Courts and/or Circuit Courts in each state, territory, or other geographical region.

Bluebook citation style is used for case names, citations, and jurisdictions.

- "C.C.D." = United States Circuit Court for the District of . . .
  - e.g.,"C.C.D.N.J." = United States Circuit Court for the District of New Jersey
- "D." = United States District Court for the District of . . .
  - e.g.,"D. Mass." = United States District Court for the District of Massachusetts
- "E." = Eastern; "M." = Middle; "N." = Northern; "S." = Southern; "W." = Western
  - e.g.,"C.C.S.D.N.Y." = United States Circuit Court for the Southern District of New York
  - e.g.,"M.D. Ala." = United States District Court for the Middle District of Alabama
- "Ct. Cl." = United States Court of Claims
- The abbreviation of a state's name alone indicates the highest appellate court in that state's judiciary at the time.
  - e.g.,"Pa." = Supreme Court of Pennsylvania
  - e.g.,"Me." = Supreme Judicial Court of Maine

== List of cases in volume 110 U.S. ==
Case Name	Page & year	Opinion of the Court	Concurring opinion(s)	Dissenting opinion(s)	Lower court	Disposition
Goodwin v. Colorado M.I. Co.	1 (1884)	Harlan	none	none	C.C.D. Colo.	affirmed
Martin v. Webb	7 (1884)	Harlan	none	none	C.C.W.D. Mo.	affirmed
Holland v. Challen	15 (1884)	Field	none	none	C.C.D. Neb.	reversed
Cedar Rapids et al. R.R. Co. v. Herring	27 (1884)	Miller	none	none	Iowa	affirmed
Taylor v. Bemiss	42 (1884)	Miller	none	none	Sup. Ct. D.C.	reversed
Gilmer v. Higley	47 (1884)	Miller	none	none	Sup. Ct. Terr. Mont.	reversed
United States v. Carey	51 (1884)	Waite	none	none	C.C.D. La.	affirmed
Jenness v. Citizens' Nat'l Bank	52 (1884)	Waite	none	none	C.C.E.D. Mich.	dismissed
Hoff v. Jasper Cnty.	53 (1884)	Waite	none	none	C.C.W.D. Mo.	affirmed
Susquehanna Boom Co. v. West Branch Boom Co.	57 (1884)	Waite	none	none	Pa.	dismissed
Holland v. Chambers	59 (1884)	Waite	none	none	C.C.E.D. Mo.	affirmed
American Bible Soc'y v. Price	61 (1884)	Waite	none	none	C.C.S.D. Ill.	affirmed
Frelinghuysen v. Key	63 (1884)	Waite	none	none	Sup. Ct. D.C.	multiple
Schreiber v. Sharpless	76 (1884)	Waite	none	none	E.D. Pa.	dismissed
H.B. Claflin & Co. v. Commonwealth Ins. Co.	81 (1884)	Matthews	none	none	C.C.D. Minn.	affirmed
Hilton v. Merritt	97 (1884)	Woods	none	none	C.C.S.D.N.Y.	affirmed
Kellogg Bridge Co. v. Hamilton	108 (1884)	Harlan	none	none	C.C.N.D. Ohio	affirmed
Allen v. Withrow	119 (1884)	Field	none	none	C.C.D. Iowa	affirmed
Bussey v. Excelsior Mfg. Co.	131 (1884)	Blatchford	none	none	C.C.E.D. Mo.	reversed
United States v. Lawton	146 (1884)	Blatchford	none	none	Ct. Cl.	affirmed
Hart v. Sansom	151 (1884)	Gray	none	none	C.C.N.D. Tex.	reversed
United States ex rel. Chandler v. Dodge Cnty.	156 (1884)	Gray	none	none	C.C.D. Neb.	reversed
Bissell v. Spring Valley Twp.	162 (1884)	Matthews	none	none	C.C.D. Kan.	affirmed
Redfield v. Ystalyfera Iron Co.	174 (1884)	Matthews	none	none	C.C.S.D.N.Y.	reversed
Quebec Bank v. Hellman	178 (1884)	Woods	none	none	C.C.S.D. Ohio	affirmed
White v. Crow	183 (1884)	Woods	none	none	C.C.D. Colo.	affirmed
City of Jonesboro v. Cairo & S.L.R.R. Co.	192 (1884)	Harlan	none	none	C.C.S.D. Ill.	affirmed
Zane v. Soffe	200 (1884)	Bradley	none	none	C.C.S.D.N.Y.	affirmed
Sioux City & P.R.R. Co. v. United States	205 (1884)	Bradley	none	none	C.C.D. Iowa	affirmed
Dimpfell v. Ohio & M. Ry. Co.	209 (1884)	Field	none	none	C.C.S.D. Ill.	affirmed
District of Columbia v. Clephane	212 (1884)	Miller	none	none	Sup. Ct. D.C.	affirmed
Vinal v. West Va. O. & O. Land Co.	215 (1884)	Waite	none	none	C.C.D.W. Va.	affirmed
C.J. Hambro & Son v. Casey	216 (1884)	Waite	none	none	C.C.E.D. La.	affirmed
Aurrecoechea v. Bangs	217 (1884)	Waite	none	none	Cal.	affirmed
United States v. Graham	219 (1884)	Waite	none	none	Ct. Cl.	affirmed
Jenkins v. Loewenthal	222 (1884)	Waite	none	none	Ill.	affirmed
Dows & Co. v. Johnson	223 (1884)	Waite	none	none	C.C.D. Iowa	dismissed
First Nat'l Bank v. Redick	224 (1884)	Waite	none	none	C.C.D. Neb.	dismissed
United States v. Grant & Co.	225 (1884)	Waite	none	none	Ct. Cl.	dismissed
Peugh v. Davis	227 (1884)	Waite	none	none	Sup. Ct. D.C.	dismissal denied
Lake Shore & M.S. Ry. Co. v. National C.B. Shoe Co.	229 (1884)	Blatchford	none	none	C.C.N.D. Ill.	affirmed
Chouteau v. Barlow	238 (1884)	Blatchford	none	none	C.C.D. Minn.	reversed
Freeman v. Dawson	264 (1884)	Gray	none	none	C.C.W.D. Tenn.	affirmed
James v. Hicks	272 (1884)	Matthews	none	none	C.C.E.D. Va.	affirmed
Krippendorf v. Hyde & Bros	276 (1884)	Matthews	none	none	C.C.D. Ind.	reversed
American File Co. v. Garrett & Sons	288 (1884)	Woods	none	none	C.C.D.R.I.	affirmed
Whiteside v. Haselton	296 (1884)	Miller	none	none	C.C.E.D. Tenn.	reversed
Illinois Cent. R.R. Co. v. Turrill	301 (1884)	Waite	none	none	C.C.N.D. Ill.	affirmed
Wabash et al. Ry. Co. v. Knox	304 (1884)	Waite	none	none	C.C.S.D. Ill.	dismissed
Jeffries v. Mutual Life Ins. Co.	305 (1884)	Blatchford	none	none	C.C.E.D. Mo.	affirmed
Vogel v. Gruaz	311 (1884)	Blatchford	none	none	C.C.S.D. Ill.	reversed
Corker v. Jones	317 (1884)	Matthews	none	none	C.C.S.D. Ga.	affirmed
City of E. St. Louis v. United States ex rel. Zebley	321 (1884)	Matthews	none	none	C.C.S.D. Ill.	reversed
United States v. Alexander	325 (1884)	Woods	none	none	C.C.M.D. Tenn.	affirmed
Taylor v. Davis' Adm'x	330 (1884)	Woods	none	none	C.C.S.D. Ill.	affirmed
United States v. Behan	338 (1884)	Bradley	none	none	Ct. Cl.	affirmed
Spring Valley Water-Works v. Schottler	347 (1884)	Waite	none	Field	Cal.	affirmed
Howard Cnty. v. Paddock	384 (1884)	Waite	none	none	C.C.W.D. Mo.	affirmed
Ex parte Cota	385 (1884)	Waite	none	none	C.C.D. Cal.	dismissed
Webster v. Buffalo Ins. Co.	386 (1884)	Waite	none	none	C.C.E.D. Mo.	dismissed
Cable v. Ellis	389 (1884)	Waite	none	none	C.C.N.D. Ill.	affirmed
Tupper v. Wise	398 (1884)	Waite	none	none	C.C.D. Cal.	dismissed
New Jersey v. Damarest	400 (1884)	Waite	none	none	N.J.	case abated
Bean v. Patterson	401 (1884)	Waite	none	none	C.C.W.D. Mo.	appeal docketed
Conro & Carkin v. Crane	403 (1884)	Blatchford	none	none	C.C.N.D. Ill.	reversed
Alexander v. Bryan	414 (1884)	Blatchford	none	none	C.C.S.D. Ala.	affirmed
The Legal-Tender Cases	421 (1884)	Gray	none	Field	C.C.S.D.N.Y.	affirmed
Iowa v. McFarland	471 (1884)	Gray	none	Miller	original	dismissed
Pennsylvania R.R. Co. v. Locomotive E.S.T. Co.	490 (1884)	Gray	none	none	C.C.E.D. Pa.	reversed
Irwin & Davis v. Williar	499 (1884)	Matthews	none	none	C.C.D. Ind.	reversed
Hurtado v. California	516 (1884)	Matthews	none	Harlan	Cal.	affirmed
Washer v. Bullitt Cnty.	558 (1884)	Woods	none	none	C.C.D. Ky.	reversed
German E.C. Church v. Ebbinghaus	568 (1884)	Woods	none	none	Sup. Ct. D.C.	reversed
Hopt v. Utah	574 (1884)	Harlan	none	none	Sup. Ct. Terr. Utah	reversed
Swann v. Wright's Ex'r	590 (1884)	Harlan	none	none	C.C.S.D. Ala.	affirmed
Swann v. Clark	602 (1884)	Harlan	none	none	C.C.S.D. Ala.	affirmed
Northern Bank v. Porter Twp.	608 (1884)	Harlan	none	none	C.C.N.D. Ohio	affirmed
McDonald v. Hovey	619 (1884)	Bradley	none	none	Sup. Ct. D.C.	dismissed
Waples v. United States	630 (1884)	Field	none	none	Ct. Cl.	affirmed
Mitchell v. Clark	633 (1884)	Miller	none	Field	Mo.	reversed
Ex parte Yarbrough	651 (1884)	Miller	none	none	C.C.N.D. Ga.	habeas corpus denied
Atchison et al. R.R. Co. v. Denver et al. R.R. Co.	667 (1884)	Waite	none	none	C.C.D. Colo.	reversed
Dallas Cnty. v. McKenzie	686 (1884)	Waite	none	none	C.C.W.D. Mo.	affirmed
United States v. Brindle	688 (1884)	Waite	none	none	C.C.E.D. Pa.	reversed
Rice v. Sioux City et al. R.R. Co.	695 (1884)	Waite	none	none	C.C.D. Minn.	affirmed
Cheely v. Clayton	701 (1884)	Gray	none	none	C.C.D. Colo.	affirmed
Freedman's S. & T. Co. v. Earle	710 (1884)	Matthews	none	none	Sup. Ct. D.C.	affirmed
Cutler v. Kouns	720 (1884)	Woods	none	none	C.C.S.D.N.Y.	reversed
United States v. Ryder	729 (1884)	Bradley	none	none	C.C.D.N.J.	affirmed
Leggett v. Allen	741 (1884)	Waite	none	none	C.C.E.D.N.Y.	dismissed
The Mamie	742 (1884)	Waite	none	none	C.C.E.D. Mich.	stay denied
