= Information (formal criminal charge) =

Document which begins a criminal proceeding

An information is a formal criminal charge which, depending upon the jurisdiction, either begins or continues a criminal proceeding in the courts. The information is one of the oldest common law pleadings (first appearing around the 13th century), and is nearly as old as the better-known indictment, with which it has always coexisted.

Although the information has been abolished in England and Wales and Northern Ireland, it is still used in Canada, the United States (at both the federal level and in some states) and various other common law jurisdictions.

== Canada ==
=== Criminal charges ===
In Canada, charges under the Criminal Code are either by summary process, or by indictment. Both types of charges begin with an information, except in the rare situation of a direct indictment by the Attorney General.

The form of an information is prescribed by the Criminal Code. Informations are to be drafted using Form 2 for both indictable matters and summary matters.

An information must be sworn by the informant, who is normally a peace officer. The informant then must lay the information before a justice of the peace. The information must contain an allegation that an offence has been committed, within the territorial jurisdiction of the justice of the peace. The justice of the peace then is required to review the information and determine if process should issue under the Criminal Code for the arrest of the individual.

If the matter is a summary matter, the information is then laid before the court with jurisdiction to hear the charges, usually the Provincial Court, and the matter will proceed directly to trial.

In indictable matters, the information is laid before a judge of the Provincial Court for the purposes of a preliminary inquiry, which is a hearing to determine if the Crown prosecutor has demonstrated that there is evidence to support the charges in the information. If the preliminary inquiry judge rules that the Crown prosecutor has satisfied this standard, the Court commits the accused to stand trial. The Crown prosecutor then files an indictment, which is the formal charge to begin the trial, normally in the superior trial court. The indictment is based on the charges originally set out in the information. The Crown is entitled to add additional charges which were supported by the evidence led in the preliminary inquiry, even if those charges were not in the information. However, if the preliminary inquiry judge declined to commit the accused on a charge set out in the information, the Crown cannot include that charge in the indictment. The matter then proceeds to trial on the indictment.

=== Information to obtain a search warrant ===
The term "information" is also used for other purposes in the Criminal Code, such as applications to obtain a search warrant. A peace officer who is seeking a search warrant must file a sworn information before a justice of the peace, outlining the reasons in support of a search warrant. The justice of the peace then reviews the information to obtain, and decides whether the information supports the issuance of a search warrant.

== United Kingdom ==
=== England and Wales ===
A criminal information was a proceeding in the King's Bench Division of the High Court brought at the suit of the Crown without a previous indictment.

Criminal informations other than those filed ex officio by the Attorney General were abolished by section 12 of the Administration of Justice (Miscellaneous Provisions) Act 1938. Any power to bring proceedings for an offence by criminal information in the High Court was abolished by section 6(6) of the Criminal Law Act 1967.

The last occasion on which there was an ex officio information by a law officer was in 1911.

=== Northern Ireland ===
Any power to bring proceedings for an offence by criminal information in the High Court was abolished by section 6(6) of the Criminal Law Act (Northern Ireland) 1967.

== United States ==
Because the Fifth Amendment to the United States Constitution expressly creates a constitutional right to be indicted by a grand jury, the information is used in federal criminal procedure only when a defendant voluntarily pleads guilty (often as part of a plea bargain) and waives the right to an indictment.

However, the Fifth Amendment right to a grand jury indictment does not apply against the state governments because the grand jury provision has not been incorporated against the states by the Fourteenth Amendment. Thus, the information has always been the dominant charging document in the western states, where extremely dispersed population distribution during the American frontier era made it difficult to select and convene petit juries to hold trials. In that era, convening even larger grand juries just to indict criminals was seen as an unnecessary extravagance.

In general, district attorneys initiate criminal actions against suspects by filing complaints. In eastern states and in federal courts, the prosecutor seeks to obtain an indictment from a grand jury, or strikes a plea bargain with the defendant, as part of which the defendant waives his right to be indicted, and then files an information as part of the process of reducing the plea bargain to judgment.

In western states, the defendant is entitled to challenge the complaint at a preliminary hearing, during which the prosecution must establish to the satisfaction of a magistrate that probable cause exists to bind over the defendant until trial. If the magistrate finds probable cause, the district attorney files an information, which supersedes the complaint and becomes the operative pleading against the defendant through trial, verdict, and judgment. The U.S. Supreme Court affirmed the constitutionality of this procedure in Hurtado v. California (1886).

The grand jury is still available in the states where informations are used, but it is usually used only for issuing indictments for certain types of crimes or for certain types of anti-corruption investigations.

== See also ==
- Chisholm, Hugh, ed. (1911). "Information" . Encyclopædia Britannica. Vol. 14 (11th ed.). Cambridge University Press. p. 556.
- United States: Federal Rules of Criminal Procedure Rule 7 and Rule 9.
- Canada: Criminal Code
