= Schreiber v. Sharpless =

- Supreme Court of the United States

Submitted December 17, 1883 Decided January 7, 1884
- Full case name: Schreiber & Others v. Sharpless
- Citations: 110 U.S. 76 (more) 3 S. Ct. 423; 28 L. Ed. 65

Holding
- Charges of copyright infringement do not survive the death of the accused and may not be transferred to the executors of their will.

Court membership
- Chief Justice Morrison Waite Associate Justices Samuel F. Miller · Stephen J. Field; Joseph P. Bradley · John M. Harlan; William B. Woods · Stanley Matthews; Horace Gray · Samuel Blatchford

Case opinion
- Majority: Waite

Schreiber v. Sharpless, 110 U.S. 76 (1884), was a United States Supreme Court case in which the Court held charges of copyright infringement do not survive the death of the accused and may not be transferred to the executors of their will.
