= Kellogg Bridge Co. v. Hamilton =

Kellogg Bridge Company v. Hamilton
- Supreme Court of the United States

Submitted October 31, 1883 Decided January 14, 1884
- Full case name: Kellogg Bridge Company v. Hamilton
- Citations: 110 U.S. 108 (more) 3 S. Ct. 537; 28 L. Ed. 86; 1884 U.S. LEXIS 1663

Court membership
- Chief Justice Morrison Waite Associate Justices Samuel F. Miller · Stephen J. Field; Joseph P. Bradley · John M. Harlan; William B. Woods · Stanley Matthews; Horace Gray · Samuel Blatchford

Case opinion
- Majority: Harlan, joined by unanimous

Kellogg Bridge Company v. Hamilton, 110 U.S. 108 (1884), was an Implied warranty of fitness for a particular purpose lawsuit which took place in 1884.

== Background ==
The company Kellogg Bridge Co. undertook to construct for the Lake Shore and Michigan Southern Railway Company an iron bridge across Maumee River at Toledo, Ohio. After doing a portion of the work it entered into a written contract with Hamilton (a subcontractor) for the completion of the bridge. The bridge was put up in several spans and in order to support the spans, falsework, consisting of piles driven in the river between the piers upon which the spans were to rest, was needed. The Bridge Company had previously constructed a part of the falsework involved in between the first and second spans, which Hamilton paid for as he had agreed to do. A part of the falsework put up by the company sank under the weight of the first span and was replaced by Hamilton. When the second fixed span was about two-thirds complete, ice in the river broke up due to a flood and the falsework was carried away causing the whole of the iron material in place on that span to fall into the river. If the piles had been driven in more firmly, they would have withstood the force of the ice and the flood. Hamilton was subject to delay of the completion of the bridge and increased expense.

Hamilton brought suit in the State court to recover the contract price of the bridge, extra claimed to be done on it, and the damages sustained by the insufficiency of the false work constructed by the Bridge Company for $3,693.78.

On diversity jurisdiction, the cause was removed to the Circuit Court of the US where the Bridge Company answered with a counterclaim for $6,619.70. The trial ended with a verdict and judgment for the plaintiff for $3,039.89. The defendant brought a writ of error to reverse that judgment. The case came to the Supreme Court.

== Opinion of the Court ==
The court said that under the circumstances, the buyer had the right to rely and necessarily relied on the judgment of the seller and not upon his own. In ordinary circumstances, the buyer has the opportunity to inspect the article sold and the seller is not the maker, so they stand on equal grounds of ignorance. But when the seller is the manufacturer, the fair presumption is that he understood the process of its manufacture and was cognizant of any latent defect caused by such process and which reasonable diligence might have prevented.
