= United States v. Mitchell =

United States v. Mitchell may refer to the following legal cases:

- United States v. Mitchell (1795), 2 U.S. (2 Dall.) 348 (1795) and 2 U.S. (2 Dall.) 357 (1795)
- United States v. Mitchell (1883), 109 U.S. 146 (1883)
- United States v. Mitchell (1907), 205 U.S. 161 (1907)
- United States v. Mitchell (1926), 271 U.S. 9 (1926)
- United States v. Mitchell (1944), 322 U.S. 65 (1944)
- United States v. Mitchell (1971), 403 U.S. 190 (1971)
- United States v. Mitchell (1980), 445 U.S. 535 (1980)
- United States v. Mitchell (1983), 463 U.S. 206 (1983)
