= Enforcement Act of 1870 =

United States federal law

- Long title: An Act to enforce the Right of Citizens of the United States to vote in the several States of this Union, and for other Purposes.
- Nicknames: Civil Rights Act of 1870, Enforcement Act, First Ku Klux Klan Act, Force Act
- Enacted by: the 41st United States Congress

Citations
- Statutes at Large: 16 Stat. 140-146

Legislative history
- Introduced in the House as H.R. 1293 by John Bingham (R–OH) on February 21, 1870; Committee consideration by House Judiciary; Passed the House on May 16, 1870 (131–43); Passed the Senate on May 20, 1870 (43–8); Agreed to by the Senate on May 25, 1870 (48–11) and by the House on (133–39); Signed into law by President Ulysses S. Grant on May 31, 1870

Major amendments
- Second Enforcement Act of 1871 (s. 20)

United States Supreme Court cases
- United States v. Reese (1876); United States v. Cruikshank (1876); United States v. Allen Crosby; United States v. Robert Hayes Mitchell

The Enforcement Act of 1870, also known as the Civil Rights Act of 1870 or First Ku Klux Klan Act, or Force Act (41st Congress, Sess. 2, ch. 114, 16 Stat. 140, enacted May 31, 1870, effective 1871), is a United States federal law that empowers the President to enforce the first section of the Fifteenth Amendment throughout the United States. The act was the first of three Enforcement Acts passed by the United States Congress in 1870 and 1871, during the Reconstruction Era, to combat attacks on the voting rights of African Americans from state officials or violent groups like the Ku Klux Klan.

The Enforcement Act of 1870 prohibits discrimination by state officials in voter registration on the basis of race, color, or previous condition of servitude. It establishes penalties for interfering with a person's right to vote and gave federal courts the power to enforce the act.

The act also authorizes the President to use the army to uphold the act and use federal marshals to bring charges against offenders for election fraud, bribery or intimidation of voters, and conspiracies to prevent citizens from exercising their constitutional rights.

The act bans the use of terror, force or bribery to prevent people from voting because of their race. Other laws banned the KKK entirely. Hundreds of KKK members were arrested and tried as common criminals and terrorists. The first Klan was more or less eradicated within a year of federal prosecution.

== Provisions ==
This act consists of 23 sections, some of which have been more notable than others.

Section 1 states that anyone who is qualified to vote in any election anywhere in the United States, including any "territorial subdivision", is eligible to vote in every election there, "without distinction of race, color, or previous condition of servitude". This section additionally overrides all law to the contrary.

Sections 2, 3, 4, and 5 provide civil remedies for people who are disenfranchised in several different ways, and additionally makes such acts a misdemeanor:

- Section 2 prohibits officials who have a duty in law to ensure the right to vote from refusing or neglecting to enable a person to do anything that is necessary to become qualified to vote.
- Section 3 applies where a person offers or attempts to perform an action that is required to become qualified to vote, but is prevented from doing so by the wrongful act or omission of an official whose duty it was to receive or permit such action. The official's act or omission is a civil wrong and misdemeanor. Additionally, the victim is considered to have done the thing he was prevented from doing.
- Section 4 prohibits interference with the right to vote by unlawful means including, in particular, threats, intimidation, violence, or bribery.
- Section 5 prohibits obstructing a person's right to vote under the 15th Amendment. Prohibited means include bribery and threats, including in particular threats of eviction, denying employment, and refusing lease renewals and work contracts.

In each of the above cases, the person responsible must pay $500 compensation to the victim, and on conviction be fined at least $500, and at the discretion of the court, imprisoned for a period between one month and one year.

Section 6 makes it a felony for two or more persons to "band or conspire together, or go in disguise upon the public highway, or upon the premises of another", in order to violate any provision of the Act or intimidate anyone in regard to their constitutional or federal legal rights. The sentence is up to $5000 and ten years' imprisonment. The offender is also disqualified from holding any federal office.

Section 7 empowers a court convicting a person of any crime under this act to punish them for any state crime that was committed in the course of committing the crime under this act.

Section 8 denies state courts jurisdiction over crimes under this act, leaving jurisdiction solely to federal district and circuit courts.

Section 9 gives federal district attorneys, marshals, and deputy marshals, court commissioners, and special appointees of the President, the duty to arrest, detain, bail, and prosecute persons suspected of offences under this act.

Section 10 gives marshals and their deputies the duty to execute warrants under this act, on pain of a $1000 penalty payable to the victim of disenfranchisement. It also gives them the power of posse comitatus, including the use of US armed forces and militia, for the purpose of enforcing such warrants.

Section 11 prohibits interfering with process under this act, including obstruction, harbouring fugitives, and rescue of detainees. The penalty is up to $1000 fine or six months' imprisonment, or both.

Section 12 authorizes fees for commissioners, district attorneys, marshals, their deputies, and clerks, in relation to process under this act, including costs of imprisonment, to be paid out of the US Treasury and recoverable from the offender on conviction.

Section 13 empowers the President to authorize use of militias and the armed forces to enforce process under this act. (Such use was subsequently made generally illegal under the Posse Comitatus Act of 1878, unless authorized by Congress, such as in this section.)

Sections 14 and 15 enforce section three of the Fourteenth Amendment to the United States Constitution, by instructing federal prosecutors to use a writ of quo warranto to remove people from government offices who were disqualified by that amendment. Reasons for such disqualification include insurrection or rebellion against the United States; holding office contrary to such disqualification became a misdemeanor. The Enforcement Act's quo warranto provisions were repealed in 1948. However, even after that repeal, there remained a federal statute initially contained in the Confiscation Act of 1862 which made insurrection a federal crime, and disqualified insurrectionists from federal offices.

Section 16 partially implements the 14th Amendment by stating that everyone in the United States has the same right to contract, sue, be a party to a case, give evidence, and benefit from the same protection of laws and be subject to the same penalties of laws, taxes etc. as white citizens. It additionally prohibits states from taxing or making other charges on immigrants that discriminate between different countries of origin. Section 17 makes such discrimination under color of law a misdemeanor, punishable with a $1000 fine or imprisonment for up to a year or both.

Section 18 re-enacts the Civil Rights Act of 1866, whose constitutionality was in question until the passage of the 14th Amendment in 1868.

Section 19 prohibits various forms of misconduct relating to voting; section 20 does the same for registration of voters, with the Second Enforcement Act of 1871 amending this section to add counting, certifying and announcing election results. Section 21 provides evidentiary presumptions relating to these offences. Section 22 makes it a crime for electoral officials to fail or refuse to do their duty. The penalty for any of the crimes under these sections is a $500 fine or three years' imprisonment, or both, plus costs.

Section 23 provides that if a person is denied election to office (except presidential or vice-presidential elector, member of Congress, or member of a state legislature) because some persons were denied the right to vote by reason of race, color or previous condition of servitude, the person so denied is nonetheless entitled to office and may sue to recover it. Federal circuit and district courts have jurisdiction if such denial of the right to vote was the sole reason for denial of office.

== Legislative history ==
The act developed from separate legislative actions in the House and Senate. H.R. 1293 was introduced by House Republican John Bingham from Ohio on February 21, 1870, and discussed on May 16, 1870. S. 810 grew from several bills from several Senators. United States Senator George F. Edmunds from Vermont submitted the first bill, followed by United States Senator Oliver P. Morton from Indiana, United States Senator Charles Sumner from Massachusetts, and United States Senator William Stewart from Nevada. After three months of debate in the Committee on the Judiciary, the final Senate version of the bill was introduced to the Senate on April 19, 1870. The act was passed by Congress in May 1870 and signed into law by United States President Ulysses S. Grant on May 31, 1870.

== Legislative breakdown ==
H.R. 1293 was brought to a floor vote in the chambers of the US Senate on May 21, 1870. Three political parties were present. The Republican Party voted 41 in favor, 1 against. The Democratic Party voted 0 in favor, 7 against, and the Liberal Republicans voted 2 in favor, 0 against. 21 members did not vote.

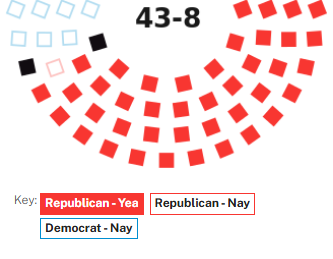
The vote breakdown by party of The Enforcement Act of 1870.

It was brought to a floor vote in the US House of Representatives on May 23, 1870. Three political parties were present to vote in the House of Representatives on the motion to pass H.R. 1293. The Republican Party voted 132 in favor, 1 against. The Democratic Party voted 1 in favor, 50 against. And the Conservative Party voted 0 in favor, 3 against. 41 members did not vote.

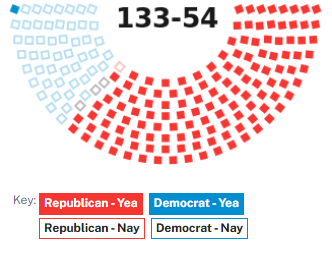
The vote breakdown by party of the Enforcement Act of 1870.

== See also ==
- Posse Comitatus Act of 1878
- Second Enforcement Act

=== U.S. Attorneys General during Reconstruction ===
- Ebenezer R. Hoar – 30th Attorney General, served 1869–1870
- Amos T. Akerman – 31st Attorney General, served 1870–1871
- George Henry Williams – 32nd Attorney General, served 1871–1875
- Edwards Pierrepont – 33rd Attorney General, served 1875–1876

=== U.S. Secretary of War during Reconstruction ===
- William W. Belknap – 30th Secretary of War, served 1869–1876

== Bibliography ==
- Foner, Eric (1997). Reconstruction: America's Unfinished Revolution, 1863–1877. New York: Harper & Row, Publishers. ISBN 978-0-06-093716-4.
- Wang, Xi (1997). The Trial of Democracy: Black Suffrage & Northern Republicans, 1860–1910. Athens, Georgia: University of Georgia Press. ISBN 978-0-8203-1837-0.
