= Jones v. Alfred H. Mayer Co. =

- Supreme Court of the United States

Argued April 1–2, 1968 Decided June 17, 1968
- Full case name: Joseph Lee Jones et ux. v. Alfred H. Mayer Co. et al.
- Citations: 392 U.S. 409 (more) 88 S. Ct. 2186; 20 L. Ed. 2d 1189; 1968 U.S. LEXIS 2980; 1 Empl. Prac. Dec. (CCH) ¶ 9832; 47 Ohio Op. 2d 43

Case history
- Prior: Certiorari to the United States Court of Appeals for the Eighth Circuit

Holding
- The Thirteenth Amendment allows Congress to regulate the sale of private property to prevent racial discrimination, as such racial discrimination is a badge of slavery.

Court membership
- Chief Justice Earl Warren Associate Justices Hugo Black · William O. Douglas; John M. Harlan II · William J. Brennan Jr. Potter Stewart · Byron White; Abe Fortas · Thurgood Marshall

Case opinions
- Majority: Stewart, joined by Warren, Black, Douglas, Brennan, Fortas, Marshall
- Concurrence: Douglas
- Dissent: Harlan, joined by White

Laws applied
- 42 U.S.C. § 1982
- This case overturned a previous ruling or rulings
- Hodges v. United States, 203 U.S. 1 (1906), Civil Rights Cases, 109 U.S. 3 (1883) (in part)

Jones v. Alfred H. Mayer Co., 392 U.S. 409 (1968), is a landmark case in which the United States Supreme Court held that Congress could regulate the sale of private property to prevent racial discrimination: "[42 U.S.C. § 1982] bars all racial discrimination, private as well as public, in the sale or rental of property, and that the statute, thus construed, is a valid exercise of the power of Congress to enforce the Thirteenth Amendment."

The Civil Rights Act of 1866 (passed by Congress over the veto of Andrew Johnson) provided the basis for this decision as embodied by 42 U.S.C. § 1982.

Reversing many precedents, the Supreme Court held that the Civil Rights Act of 1866 prohibited both private and state-backed discrimination and that the 13th Amendment authorized Congress to prohibit private acts of discrimination as among "the badges and incidents of slavery." Congress possessed the power to "determine what are the badges and incidents of slavery, and the authority to translate that determination into effective legislation."

== See also ==
- List of United States Supreme Court cases, volume 392
- Shelley v. Kraemer (1948), private landowners racial discrimination case
