= Civil Rights Cases =

Group of United States Supreme Court cases

- Supreme Court of the United States

Decided October 15, 1883
- Full case name: United States v. Stanley; United States v. Ryan; United States v. Nichols; United States v. Singleton; Robinson et ux. v. Memphis & Charleston R.R. Co.
- Citations: 109 U.S. 3 (more) 3 S. Ct. 18; 27 L. Ed. 835

Holding
- The Thirteenth and Fourteenth Amendments did not empower Congress to safeguard black people against the actions of private individuals. To decide otherwise would afford black people a special status under the law that white people did not enjoy.

Court membership
- Chief Justice Morrison Waite Associate Justices Samuel F. Miller · Stephen J. Field; Joseph P. Bradley · John M. Harlan; William B. Woods · Stanley Matthews; Horace Gray · Samuel Blatchford

Case opinions
- Majority: Bradley, joined by Waite, Miller, Field, Woods, Matthews, Gray, Blatchford
- Dissent: Harlan

Laws applied
- U.S. Const. amends. XIII, XIV and Civil Rights Act of 1875
- Overruled by
- Jones v. Alfred H. Mayer Co., 392 U.S. 409 (1968) (in part)

The Civil Rights Cases, 109 U.S. 3 (1883), were a group of five landmark cases in which the Supreme Court of the United States held that the Thirteenth and Fourteenth Amendments did not empower Congress to outlaw racial discrimination by private individuals. The holding that the Thirteenth Amendment did not empower the federal government to punish racist acts done by private citizens would be overturned by the Supreme Court in the 1968 case Jones v. Alfred H. Mayer Co. The Fourteenth Amendment not applying to private entities, however, is still valid precedent to this day. Although the Fourteenth Amendment-related decision has never been overturned, in the 1964 case of Heart of Atlanta Motel, Inc. v. United States, the Supreme Court held that Congress could prohibit racial discrimination by private actors under the Commerce Clause.

During Reconstruction, Congress had passed the Civil Rights Act of 1875, which entitled everyone to access accommodation, public transport, and theaters regardless of race or color. In his majority opinion in the Civil Rights Cases, Associate Justice Joseph P. Bradley struck down the Civil Rights Act of 1875, holding that the Thirteenth Amendment "merely abolishes slavery" and that the Fourteenth Amendment did not give Congress the power to outlaw private acts of racial discrimination. Associate Justice John Marshall Harlan was the lone dissenter in the case, writing that the "substance and spirit of the recent amendments of the constitution have been sacrificed by a subtle and ingenious verbal criticism." The decision ushered in the widespread segregation of black people in housing, employment, and public life that confined them to second-class citizenship throughout much of the United States until the passage of civil rights legislation in the 1960s.

== Background ==
Black American plaintiffs, in five cases from lower courts, sued theaters, hotels, and transit companies that refused to admit them, or had excluded them from "white only" facilities. The Civil Rights Act of 1875 had been passed by Congress and entitled everyone to access accommodation, public transport, and theaters regardless of race or color. This followed the American Civil War (1860–1865), President Abraham Lincoln's Emancipation Proclamation (1 January 1863) to end slavery, and the Fourteenth Amendment to the US Constitution (9 July 1868), which reads, "No State shall make or enforce any law which shall abridge the privileges or immunities of citizens of the United States; nor shall any State deprive any person of life, liberty, or property, without due process of law; nor deny to any person within its jurisdiction the equal protection of the laws." To implement the principles in the Fourteenth Amendment, Congress had specified that people could not be discriminated against on grounds of race or color in access to services offered to the general public. The business owners contended that the Civil Rights Act of 1875 was itself unconstitutional, and an Act of Congress should not be able to interfere with their private rights of property.

At the Supreme Court level, the five originally independent cases – United States v. Stanley, United States v. Ryan, United States v. Nichols, United States v. Singleton, and Robinson et ux. v. Memphis & Charleston R.R. Co. – were consolidated for issuing a single judgment.

== Judgment ==
The Supreme Court, in an 8–1 decision by Justice Joseph P. Bradley, held that the language of the Fourteenth Amendment, which prohibited denial of equal protection by a state, did not give Congress power to regulate these private acts, because it was the result of conduct by private individuals, not state law or action, that black people were suffering. Section five empowers Congress only to enforce the prohibition on state action. Legislation by Congress on subjects which are within the domain of the state were, apparently, not authorized by the Fourteenth Amendment. Private acts of racial discrimination were simply private wrongs that the national government was powerless to correct.

Bradley said the following, holding the Constitution did "not authorize Congress to create a code of municipal law for the regulation of private rights," as distinct from "state" laws. In effect, only state bodies were sufficiently "public" so as to be regulated.

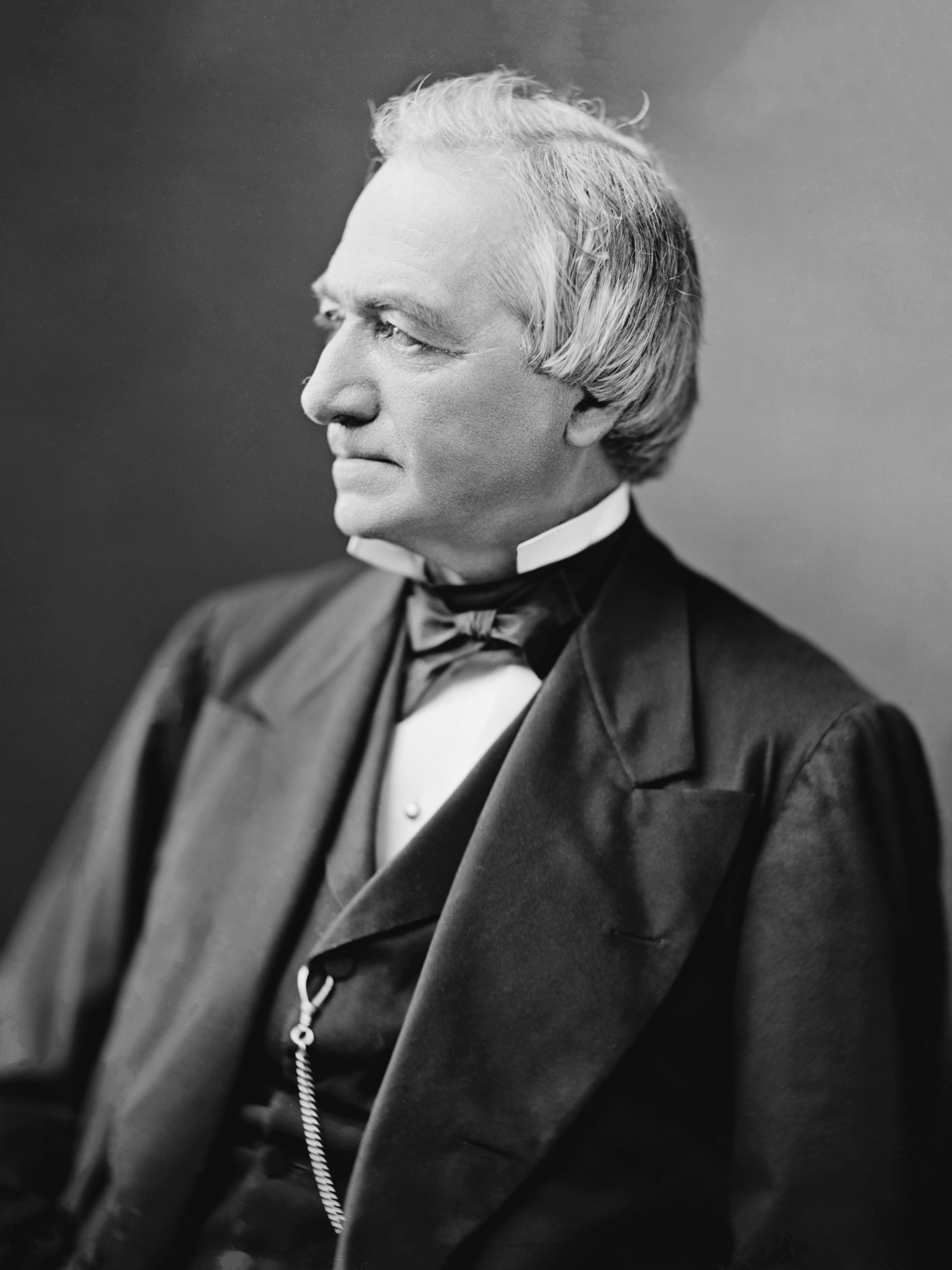
Joseph P. Bradley authored the opinion of the court.

... individual invasion of individual rights is not the subject-matter of the [Fourteenth] Amendment. It has a deeper and broader scope. It nullifies and makes void all state legislation, and state action of every kind, which impairs the privileges and immunities of citizens of the United States, or which injures them in life, liberty or property without due process of law, or which denies to any of them the equal protection of the laws. ...

It does not invest congress with power to legislate upon subjects which are within the domain of state legislation; but to provide modes of relief against state legislation, or state action, of the kind referred to. It does not authorize congress to create a code of municipal law for the regulation of private rights; but to provide modes of redress against the operation of state laws, and the action of state officers, executive or judicial, when these are subversive of the fundamental rights specified in the amendment. Positive rights and privileges are undoubtedly secured by the fourteenth amendment; but they are secured by way of prohibition against state laws and state proceedings affecting those rights and privileges, and by power given to congress to legislate for the purpose of carrying such prohibition into effect; and such legislation must necessarily be predicated upon such supposed state laws or state proceedings, and be directed to the correction of their operation and effect. A quite full discussion of this aspect of the amendment may be found in U. S. v. Cruikshank, 92 U. S. 542; Virginia v. Rives, 100 U. S. 313, and Ex parte Virginia, Id. 339.

... it would be running the slavery argument into the ground to make it apply to every act of discrimination which a person may see fit to make as to guests he will entertain, or as to the people he will take into his coach or cab or car; or admit to his concert or theater, or deal with in other matters of intercourse or business. Innkeepers and public carriers, by the laws of all the states, so far as we are aware, are bound, to the extent of their facilities, to furnish proper accommodation to all unobjectionable persons who in good faith apply for them. If the laws themselves make any unjust discrimination, amenable to the prohibitions of the fourteenth amendment, congress has full power to afford a remedy under that amendment and in accordance with it.

When a man has emerged from slavery, and by the aid of beneficent legislation has shaken off the inseparable concomitants of that state, there must be some stage in the progress of his elevation when he takes the rank of a mere citizen, and ceases to be the special favorite of the laws, and when his rights as a citizen, or a man, are to be protected in the ordinary modes by which other men's rights are protected. There were thousands of free colored people in this country before the abolition of slavery, enjoying all the essential rights of life, liberty, and property the same as white citizens; yet no one, at that time, thought that it was any invasion of their personal status as freemen because they were not admitted to all the privileges enjoyed by white citizens, or because they were subjected to discriminations in the enjoyment of accommodations in inns, public conveyances, and places of amusement. Mere discriminations on account of race or color were not regarded as badges of slavery ...

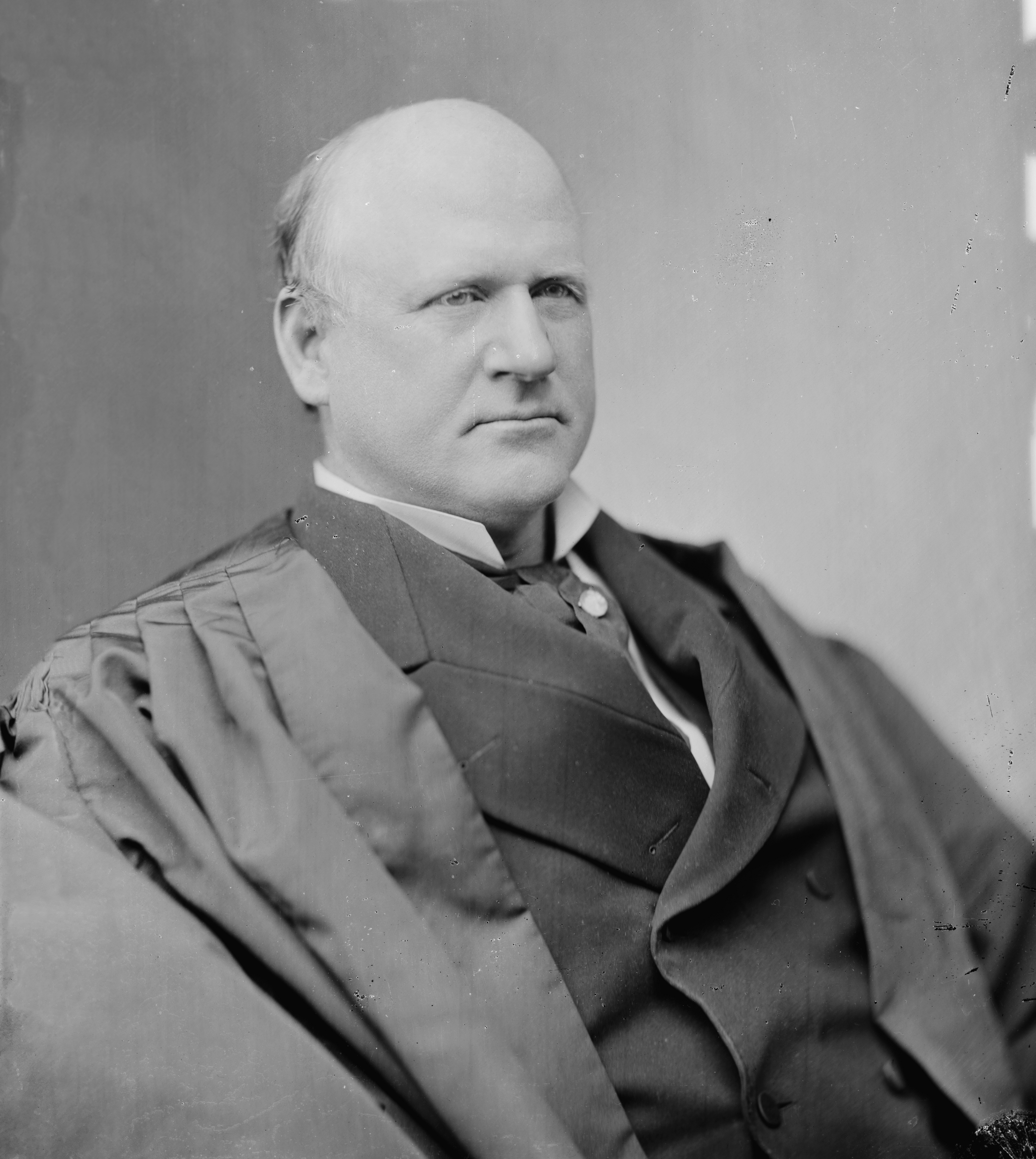
John Marshall Harlan became known as the "Great Dissenter" for his fiery dissent in Civil Rights Cases and other early civil rights cases.

While Associate Justice John Marshall Harlan had unsuccessfully pressured Senator Charles Sumner to drop the Civil Rights Act of 1875 while leader of the Kentucky Republican Party, his wife convinced him to dissent from holding the law unconstitutional. Harlan's wife, Malvina Shanklin Harlan, brought former Chief Justice Roger B. Taney's inkstand to his desk, inspiring Harlan to use the pen used to write the notorious Dred Scott v. Sandford decision for an impassioned defense of African Americans' civil rights.

Noting that Judge John Taylor Coleridge had held English common law to treat innskeepers as under quasi-public employment prohibiting discrimination between well-behaved customers, Harlan opined that a federal prohibition against racial discrimination in public accommodations merely expunged the inferiority imposed on African Americans by slavery. Accordingly, Harlan opined that the Civil Rights Act of 1875 was a constitutional use of Congress' authority under the Thirteenth Amendment. He also referred to McCulloch v. Maryland (1819) for a broad reading of the Necessary and Proper Clause as supporting Congress’ discretion to regulate private discrimination under the Reconstruction Amendments.

== Significance ==
The decision met with public protest across the country, and led to regular "indignation meetings" held in numerous cities. State officials in the South took advantage of the eclipsed role of Congress in the prohibition of racial discrimination and proceeded to embody individual practices of racial segregation into laws that legalized the treatment of blacks as second-class citizens for another seventy years. The court's decision thus ultimately led to the enactment of state laws, such as Jim Crow Laws, which codified what had previously been individual adherence to the practice of racial segregation. Several northern and western states however did not follow suit and began instead enacting their own bans on discrimination in public places.

Harlan received letters from former President Rutherford B. Hayes, former Supreme Court Justice Noah Haynes Swayne, and abolitionist Frederick Douglass praising his dissent. He correctly predicted the decision's long-term consequences: it put an end to the attempts by Radical Republicans to ensure the civil rights of blacks and ushered in the widespread segregation of blacks in housing, employment and public life that confined them to second-class citizenship throughout much of the United States until the passage of civil rights legislation in the 1960s in the wake of the Civil Rights Movement. Furthermore, the ruling spurred the federal government into treating racial discrimination as an unactionable local issue.

The decision that the Reconstruction-era Civil Rights Acts were unconstitutional has not been overturned; on the contrary, the Supreme Court reaffirmed this limited reading of the Fourteenth Amendment in United States v. Morrison, 529 U.S. 598 (2000), in which it held that Congress did not have the authority to enact parts of the Violence Against Women Act.

The Court has, however, upheld more recent civil rights laws based on other powers of Congress. Title II of the Civil Rights Act of 1964 generally revived the ban on discrimination in public accommodations that was in the Civil Rights Act of 1875, but under the Commerce Clause of Article I instead of the 14th Amendment; the Court held Title II to be constitutional in Heart of Atlanta Motel v. United States, 379 U.S. 241 (1964).

== See also ==
- US labor law
- List of United States Supreme Court cases, volume 109
- United States v. Cruikshank
- Plessy v. Ferguson
- Constantine v Imperial Hotels Ltd [1944] KB 693
