= List of United States Supreme Court cases by the Warren Court =

Supreme Court of the United States
Warren Court
- Vinson Court ← → Burger Court
- October 5, 1953 – June 23, 1969 (15 years, 261 days)
- Seat: Supreme Court Building; Washington, D.C.
- No. of positions: 9
- Warren Court decisions

This is a partial chronological list of cases decided by the United States Supreme Court during the Warren Court, the tenure of Chief Justice Earl Warren, from October 5, 1953, through June 23, 1969.

Case name	Focus	Citation	Summary
Toolson v. New York Yankees, Inc.	Antitrust	346 U.S. 356 (1953)	baseball antitrust exemption upheld
Wilko v. Swan	Arbitration	346 U.S. 427 (1953)	Claims under Securities Act of 1933 not arbitrable
Miller Brothers Co. v. Maryland		347 U.S. 340 (1954)	use tax imposed by one state against merchant in another state violated Due Process Clause of the 14th Amendment
Brown v. Board of Education of Topeka	Racial Segregation	347 U.S. 483 (1954)	reversed the ruling of Plessy v. Ferguson, "separate ... inherently unequal"
Hernandez v. Texas		347 U.S. 475 (1954)	application of the Fourteenth Amendment to Mexican Americans
Bolling v. Sharpe	Racial Segregation	347 U.S. 497 (1954)	segregation in the District of Columbia
United States v. Harriss		347 U.S. 612 (1954)	constitutionality of The Federal Regulation of Lobbying Act of 1946
Berman v. Parker		348 U.S. 26 (1954)	eminent domain, takings
United States v. International Boxing Club of New York	Antitrust	348 U.S. 236 (1955)	boxing not exempt from antitrust regulation
Tee-Hit-Ton Indians v. United States		348 U.S. 272 (1955)	Federal government did not owe Indian tribe compensation for timber taken from tribal-occupied lands in Alaska under the 5th Amendment
Commissioner v. Glenshaw Glass Co.		348 U.S. 426 (1955)	definition of taxable income
Williamson v. Lee		348 U.S. 483 (1955)	Due Process Clause, economic liberties
Quinn v. United States		349 U.S. 155 (1955)	Fifth Amendment rights with regards to Congressional investigations.
Lucy v. Adams	Racial Segregation	350 U.S. 1 (1955)	established the right of all citizens to be accepted as students at the University of Alabama
Corn Products Refining Co. v. Commissioner		350 U.S. 46 (1955)	Hedging futures gains are ordinary if on raw materials
United Gas Pipe Line Co. v. Mobile Gas Service Corp.		350 U.S. 332 (1956)	contracts under the Natural Gas Act of 1938
Federal Power Commission v. Sierra Pacific Power Co.		350 U.S. 348 (1956)	contracts under the Federal Power Act
Griffin v. Illinois		351 U.S. 12 (1956)	access to court transcript for indigent appeals
Communist Party v. Subversive Activities Control Board		351 U.S. 115 (1956)	First of Two Cases involving compulsory registration of Communist Party members. Court didn't answer questions raised concerning constitutionality of Act requiring compulsory registration.
Radovich v. National Football League		352 U.S. 445 (1957)	professional football covered by antitrust laws
Reid v. Covert		354 U.S. 1 (1957)	treaty power, right to jury trial
Watkins v. United States		354 U.S. 178 (1957)	rights of a witness in refusing to answer questions before the House Un-American Activities Committee
Yates v. United States	Free Speech	354 U.S. 298 (1957)	free speech, distinction between expression of opinion and advocacy of action
Morey v. Doud		354 U.S. 457 (1957)	States do not have power to make special exemptions in legislation for particular actors (overruled by City of New Orleans v. Dukes)
Roth v. United States	Free Speech	354 U.S. 476 (1957)	obscenity
Conley v. Gibson		355 U.S. 41 (1957)	liberal pleading standards under Rule 8 of the Federal Rules of Civil Procedure
McGee v. International Life Insurance Co.		355 U.S. 220 (1957)	California did not violate the Due Process Clause when entering a binding judgment on a Texas corporation with "substantial connection[s]" to California
Lambert v. California		355 U.S. 225 (1957)	mens rea and ignorance of the law
One, Inc. v. Olesen		355 U.S. 371 (1958)	pro-homosexual writings and the Comstock laws
Perez v. Brownell		356 U.S. 44 (1958)	revocation of citizenship for voting in a foreign election
Trop v. Dulles	Cruel and unusual punishment	356 U.S. 86 (1958)	Eighth Amendment, loss of citizenship
Sherman v. United States		356 U.S. 369 (1958)	Entrapment provisions apply to actions of government informers as well as agents
Byrd v. Blue Ridge Rural Electric Cooperative, Inc.		356 U.S. 525 (1958)	application of the Erie doctrine
Ellis v. United States		356 U.S. 674 (1958)	Due Process, in forma pauperis
United States v. Procter & Gamble Co.		356 U.S. 677 (1958)	The secrecy of Grand jury testimonies
Kent v. Dulles		357 U.S. 116 (1958)	right to travel, power of Secretary of State
Societe Internationale v. Rogers		357 U.S. 197 (1958)	appropriateness of involuntary dismissal of a case in which petitioner failed to produce records of a Swiss bank account
NAACP v. Alabama		357 U.S. 449 (1958)	freedom of association, privacy of membership lists
Speiser v. Randall		357 U.S. 513 (1958)	loyalty oaths
Cooper v. Aaron	Racial Segregation	358 U.S. 1 (1958)	enforcement of desegregation, "massive resistance"
United Gas Pipe Line Co. v. Memphis Light, Gas, and Water Division		358 U.S. 103 (1958)	contracts under the Natural Gas Act of 1938
Cammarano v. United States		358 U.S. 498 (1959)	business expenses incurred for the "promotion or defeat of legislation" are not tax deductible
Bartkus v. Illinois		359 U.S. 121 (1959)	"separate sovereigns" exception to double jeopardy; federal and state officials may cooperate in criminal investigations
Frank v. Maryland		359 U.S. 360 (1959)	warrantless administrative searches are permissible under the Fourth Amendment
Beacon Theatres v. Westover		359 U.S. 500 (1959)	right to civil jury trial under the Seventh Amendment, determination of legal & equitable issues
Louisiana Power & Light Co. v. City of Thibodaux		360 U.S. 25 (1959)	Abstention doctrine
Barenblatt v. United States		360 U.S. 109 (1959)	upholding conviction for refusing to answer questions before the House Un-American Activities Committee against First Amendment challenge
Smith v. California		361 U.S. 147 (1959)	sale of obscene books
Bates v. City of Little Rock		361 U.S. 516 (1960)	First Amendment, compelled disclosure of membership lists
United States v. Raines		362 U.S. 17 (1960)	Fifteenth Amendment, Civil Rights Act
Federal Power Commission v. Tuscarora Indian Nation		362 U.S. 99 (1960)	eminent domain over Indian lands
Flora v. United States		362 U.S. 145 (1960)	Pay Income Tax Then Litigate, Internal Revenue Act
Dusky v. United States		362 U.S. 402 (1960)	standard for adjudicative competence
Commissioner v. Duberstein		363 U.S. 278 (1960)	definition of a 'gift' for taxation purposes
Flemming v. Nestor		363 U.S. 603 (1960)	no property right in Social Security benefits
Boynton v. Virginia		364 U.S. 454 (1960)	Racial Segregation
Times Film Corp. v. City of Chicago		365 U.S. 43 (1961)	required submission of films to rating boards is not necessarily unconstitutional
Monroe v. Pape		365 U.S. 167 (1961)	municipalities cannot be held liable under the Civil Rights Act of 1871
Aro Mfg. Co. v. Convertible Top Replacement Co.		365 U.S. 336 (1961)	doctrine of repair and reconstruction in United States patent law
Burton v. Wilmington Parking Authority		365 U.S. 715 (1961)	state action
Gomillion v. Lightfoot	Racial Segregation	364 U.S. 339 (1960)	race-based electoral districting
James v. United States		366 U.S. 213 (1961)	assessment of income tax on embezzled funds
McGowan v. Maryland		366 U.S. 420 (1961)	constitutionality of laws with religious origins but secular purposes
Braunfeld v. Brown		366 U.S. 599 (1961)	constitutionality of Sabbath laws requiring Sunday closure of stores
Gallagher v. Crown Kosher Super Market of Massachusetts, Inc.		366 U.S. 617 (1961)	Massachusetts blue laws upheld against challenge by Kosher grocery store
Communist Party v. Subversive Activities Control Board		367 U.S. 1 (1961)	Second of Two Cases involving compulsory registration of Communist Party members. Court upheld constitutionality of Act requiring compulsory registration.
Scales v. United States		367 U.S. 203 (1961)	upheld the conviction of Junius Scales for violating of the Smith Act on the basis on his membership in the Communist Party
Jarecki v. G.D. Searle & Co.		367 U.S. 303 (1961)	using noscitur a sociis to interpret the Excess Profits Tax Act of 1950
Torcaso v. Watkins		367 U.S. 488 (1961)	oaths, religious test, First Amendment
Poe v. Ullman		367 U.S. 497 (1961)	ripeness to challenge statute banning contraceptives
Mapp v. Ohio	Criminal procedure	367 U.S. 643 (1961)	search and seizure, exclusionary rule
Marcus v. Search Warrant		367 U.S. 717 (1961)	Procedural burden on state in seizure of obscene material
Hamilton v. Alabama		368 U.S. 52 (1961)	Absence of defendant's counsel at the time of his arraignment violated his rights under the Due Process Clause of the Fourteenth Amendment
Hoyt v. Florida		368 U.S. 57 (1961)	all-male jury in a woman's murder trial did not violate Fourteenth Amendment
Cramp v. Board of Public Instruction		368 U.S. 278 (1961)	Florida statute required every employee of the State and its subdivisions to swear in writing that, he has never lent his "aid, support, advice, counsel or influence to the Communist Party." violated his rights under the Due Process Clause of the Fourteenth Amendment
Oyler v. Boles		368 U.S. 448 (1962)	habitual criminal sentencing and due process
United Gas Pipe Line Co. v. Ideal Cement Co.		369 U.S. 134 (1962)	application of the Pullman abstention doctrine
Fong Foo v. United States		369 U.S. 141 (1962)	double jeopardy against federal courts
Baker v. Carr	Redistricting, malapportionment	369 U.S. 186 (1962)	malapportionment of electoral districts; equal protection clause; one person, one vote
Goldblatt v. Hempstead		369 U.S. 590 (1962)	due process, takings clause, safety regulations
NLRB v. Washington Aluminum Co.		370 U.S. 9 (1962)	Unorganized workers have the right to engage in concerted activity over working conditions without making a prior specific demand.
Engel v. Vitale	Establishment Clause	370 U.S. 421 (1962)	school prayer
Manual Enterprises v. Day		370 U.S. 478 (1962)	magazine containing nude photographs of men not considered obscene
Bantam Books, Inc. v. Sullivan		372 U.S. 58 (1963)	government may not blacklist books and magazines it deems "objectionable"
Jones v. Cunningham		371 U.S. 236 (1963)	state prison inmates have the right to petition for habeas corpus
Wong Sun v. United States		371 U.S. 471 (1963)	fruit of the poisonous tree doctrine in a narcotics case
Schlude v. Commissioner		372 U.S. 128 (1963)	what income must be included for income tax purposes when accrual method of accounting is used
Edwards v. South Carolina		372 U.S. 229 (1963)	First Amendment, protest marches at state capital
Gideon v. Wainwright	Criminal procedure	372 U.S. 335 (1963)	right to counsel
Douglas v. California		372 U.S. 353 (1963)	Fourteenth Amendment; right of poor defendants to criminal court appeals
Gray v. Sanders		372 U.S. 368 (1963)	state county districts must conform to "one person, one vote"
Gibson v. Florida Legislative Investigation Committee		372 U.S. 539 (1963)	requiring person divulge information contained in an organization's membership lists violates freedom of association under First Amendment
Ferguson v. Skrupa		372 U.S. 726 (1963)	substantive due process, economic liberties
Brady v. Maryland	Criminal procedure	373 U.S. 83 (1963)	exculpatory evidence and due process
Florida Lime & Avocado Growers, Inc. v. Paul		373 U.S. 132 (1963)	Preemption, Dormant Commerce Clause
Silver v. New York Stock Exchange		373 U.S. 341 (1963)	duty of self-regulation imposed upon the New York Stock Exchange by the Securities Exchange Act of 1934 did not exempt it from the antitrust laws
Ker v. California		374 U.S. 23 (1963)	incorporation of the Fourth Amendment protections against unreasonable search & seizure against the states
Abington School District v. Schempp	Establishment Clause	374 U.S. 203 (1963)	constitutionality of mandatory bible reading in public schools
Sherbert v. Verner	Free Exercise Clause	374 U.S. 398 (1963)	strict scrutiny for religiously-based discrimination in unemployment compensation
England v. Louisiana State Board of Medical Examiners		375 U.S. 411 (1964)	refining procedures for Pullman abstention from deciding issues of state law
Wesberry v. Sanders	Redistricting, malapportionment	376 U.S. 1 (1964)	U.S. Congressional districts must conform to "one person, one vote"
Compco Corp. v. Day-Brite Lighting, Inc.		376 U.S. 234 (1964)	preemption of state unfair competition laws which restrict sale of unpatented items
Sears, Roebuck & Co. v. Stiffel Co.		376 U.S. 225 (1964)	preemption of state unfair competition laws which restrict sale of unpatented items, decided same day as Compco Corp. v. Day-Brite Lighting, Inc.
New York Times Co. v. Sullivan	Free Speech	376 U.S. 254 (1964)	freedom of speech, libel
Banco Nacional de Cuba v. Sabbatino		376 U.S. 398 (1964)	jurisdiction of federal courts over acts of foreign countries; act of state doctrine
Schneider v. Rusk		377 U.S. 163 (1964)	Naturalized U.S. citizens have the right to return to and reside in their native countries, and retain their U.S. citizenship, even if they never return to the United States
Massiah v. United States		377 U.S. 201 (1964)	Sixth Amendment prohibition on police speaking to suspect represented by counsel
Griffin v. County School Board of Prince Edward County	Racial Segregation	377 U.S. 218 (1964)	closing the local school and giving white students vouchers to attend schools outside of the county was unconstitutional under the equal protection clause
Wilbur-Ellis Co. v. Kuther		377 U.S. 422 (1964)	extension of doctrine of repair and reconstruction to enhancement of device's function
Reynolds v. Sims	Redistricting, malapportionment	377 U.S. 533 (1964)	state legislature districts must conform to "one person, one vote"
Malloy v. Hogan		378 U.S. 1 (1964)	Fifth Amendment right against self-incrimination was applicable within state courts as well as federal courts
Griffin v. Maryland		378 U.S. 130 (1964)	segregation protests
Barr v. City of Columbia		378 U.S. 146 (1964)	due process and ex post facto law
Robinson v. Florida	Cruel and unusual punishment	378 U.S. 153 (1964)	segregation protests
Jacobellis v. Ohio	Free Speech	378 U.S. 184 (1964)	"I know [obscenity] when I see it[.]" – Justice Potter Stewart
Quantity of Books v. Kansas		378 U.S. 205 (1964)	Seizure of allegedly obscene materials requires prior adversary hearing
Bell v. Maryland		378 U.S. 226 (1964)	segregation protests
Bouie v. City of Columbia		378 U.S. 347 (1964)	due process and ex post facto law
United States v. Continental Can Co.		378 U.S. 441 (1964)	antitrust
Escobedo v. Illinois	Criminal procedure	378 U.S. 478 (1964)	right to remain silent
Cooper v. Pate		378 U.S. 546 (1964)	The court ruled for the first time that state prison inmates have the standing to sue in federal court to address their grievances under the Civil Rights Act of 1871.
Beck v. Ohio		379 U.S. 89 (1964)	probable cause and searches incident to a lawful arrest
McLaughlin v. Florida		379 U.S. 184 (1964)	striking down an anti-miscegenation law aimed at prevent cohabitation of interracial couples
Heart of Atlanta Motel v. United States		379 U.S. 241 (1964)	interstate commerce, civil rights, public accommodations
Katzenbach v. McClung		379 U.S. 294 (1964)	civil rights and interstate commerce, decided same day as Heart of Atlanta Motel v. United States
Stanford v. Texas		379 U.S. 476 (1965)	Fourth Amendment, Fourteenth Amendment, Unconstitutionality of State issued general warrants
Cox v. Louisiana		379 U.S. 536 (1965)	First Amendment, "breach of the peace" statutes
Freedman v. Maryland		380 U.S. 51 (1965)	First Amendment, motion picture censorship
United States v. Seeger		380 U.S. 163 (1965)	definition of religion for a military draft exemption
Swain v. Alabama		380 U.S. 202 (1965)	use of struck jury
Hanna v. Plumer		380 U.S. 460 (1965)	interpretation of the Erie doctrine, Civil Procedure
Dombrowski v. Pfister		380 U.S. 479 (1965)	federal injunction against state criminal trial for subversion
Harman v. Forssenius		380 U.S. 528 (1965)	Virginia's partial repeal of the poll tax violated 24th Amendment
Griffin v. California		380 U.S. 609 (1965)	prosecutor commenting on a defendant's refusal to testify violates the defendant's Fifth Amendment rights
One 1958 Plymouth Sedan v. Pennsylvania		380 U.S. 693 (1965)	evidence that is obtained in violation of the Fourth Amendment may not be relied on to sustain a civil forfeiture
Griswold v. Connecticut	Right to privacy	381 U.S. 479 (1965)	privacy, birth control
Estes v. Texas		381 U.S. 532 (1965)	overturning Billy Sol Estes conviction on 14th Amendment due process grounds due to pretrial publicity
Lamont v. Postmaster General		381 U.S. 301 (1965)	Declared unconstitutional a Federal statute requiring that addressees of "Communist political propaganda" affirmatively indicate their request to receive such mailings
Albertson v. Subversive Activities Control Board		382 U.S. 70 (1965)	Communist Party of the United States of America members could not be required to register with the government under the Fifth Amendment
Graham v. John Deere Co.		383 U.S. 1 (1966)	nonobviousness as a condition of patentability
Baxstrom v. Herold		383 U.S. 107 (1966)	Prisoners committed to civil mental institutions have a right to a hearing to determine whether or not they are in fact mentally disordered.
Brown v. Louisiana		383 U.S. 131 (1966)	first amendment, right to protest
South Carolina v. Katzenbach		383 U.S. 301 (1966)	Voting Rights Act, Fifteenth Amendment
Memoirs v. Massachusetts	Free Speech	383 U.S. 413 (1966)	obscenity
Harper v. Virginia Board of Elections		383 U.S. 663 (1966)	poll taxes are unconstitutional under the Equal Protection Clause
United Mine Workers of America v. Gibbs		383 U.S. 715 (1966)	federal court jurisdiction over pendent claims
United States v. Price		383 U.S. 787 (1966)	the murders of Chaney, Goodman, and Schwerner
Sheppard v. Maxwell		384 U.S. 333 (1966)	the Sam Sheppard case, defendant's right to a fair trial vs. freedom of the press
Miranda v. Arizona	Criminal procedure	384 U.S. 436 (1966)	self-incrimination ("right to remain silent")
Federal Trade Commission v. Dean Foods Co.		384 U.S. 597 (1966)	federal agencies can use the All Writs Act to seek an injunction against a threatened action that will substantially interfere with the agency's performance of its statutory duty
Katzenbach v. Morgan		384 U.S. 641 (1966)	voting rights, Section 5 power
Schmerber v. California		384 U.S. 757 (1966)	Unless exigent circumstances exist, state may not take warrantless blood sample from a suspect; Evidence from a blood sample is not compelled testimony and therefore does not implicate the Fifth Amendment privilege against self incrimination
Garrity v. New Jersey		385 U.S. 493 (1967)	rights of police officers against self-incrimination
Whitus v. Georgia		385 U.S. 545 (1967)	racial discrimination in jury selection
Redrup v. New York		386 U.S. 767 (1967)	striking down state power to censor written works of fiction
In Re Gault		387 U.S. 1 (1967)	due process, juveniles
Abbott Laboratories v. Gardner		387 U.S. 136 (1967)	reviewability of administrative decisions
Toilet Goods Association, Inc. v. Gardner		387 U.S. 158 (1967)	ripeness in the context of judicial review of administrative decisions
Afroyim v. Rusk		387 U.S. 253 (1967)	federal government cannot strip a person of his citizenship
Reitman v. Mulkey		387 U.S. 369 (1967)	states may repeal laws providing protection against racial discrimination by Amending their state Constitution of referendum if their immediate objective is neutral and not to facilitate private racism
Loving v. Virginia	Racial Segregation	388 U.S. 1 (1967)	state laws banning interracial marriage (anti-miscegenation laws)
Berger v. New York		388 U.S. 41 (1967)	Telephone tapping in a bribery case, Fourth Amendment
Curtis Publishing Co. v. Butts		388 U.S. 130 (1967)	libel; effect of Sullivan on private figures
United States v. Wade		388 U.S. 218 (1967)	no police lineup without counsel
Gilbert v. California		388 U.S. 263 (1967)	handwriting
United States v. Robel		389 U.S. 258 (1967)	First Amendment, right of association
Prima Paint Corp. v. Flood & Conklin Mfg. Co.		388 U.S. 395 (1967)	Separability principle: challenges to enforceability of contracts with arbitration clauses must be decided by arbitrator unless clause itself is challenged
Katz v. United States	Criminal procedure	389 U.S. 347 (1967)	wiretapping as search and seizure
Zschernig v. Miller		389 U.S. 429 (1968)	foreign relations and state property law preventing inheritance by nonresident aliens
Mora v. McNamara		389 U.S. 934 (1967)	denial of certiorari in a case questioning the legality of the Vietnam War
Haynes v. United States		390 U.S. 85 (1968)	Compulsory firearm registration as self-incrimination
Provident Tradesmens Bank & Trust Co. v. Patterson		390 U.S. 102 (1968)	indispensable parties under the Federal Rules of Civil Procedure
Albrecht v. Herald Co.		390 U.S. 145 (1968)	minimum price agreements between wholesalers and franchisees unlawful under the Sherman Act
Avery v. Midland County		390 U.S. 474 (1968)	local government districts must conform to "one person, one vote"
Ginsberg v. New York		390 U.S. 629 (1968)	States can prohibit sale of obscene material to minors
Levy v. Louisiana		391 U.S. 68 (1968)	An illegitimate child may still sue on behalf of a deceased parent; to deny them this right violates the Fourteenth Amendment
Duncan v. Louisiana		391 U.S. 145 (1968)	selective incorporation, trial by jury
United States v. O'Brien		391 U.S. 367 (1968)	free speech, burning draft cards
Menominee Tribe v. United States		391 U.S. 404 (1968)	Tribal hunting and fishing rights, treaty interpretation
Green v. County School Board of New Kent County	Racial Segregation	391 U.S. 430 (1968)	"freedom-of-choice" desegregation plan held unconstitutional
Witherspoon v. Illinois		391 U.S. 510 (1968)	constitutional status of a death-qualified jury
Pickering v. Board of Education		391 U.S. 563 (1968)	public employees' free speech rights
Terry v. Ohio	Criminal procedure	392 U.S. 1 (1968)	search and seizure, power of police to stop and frisk suspicious persons
Flast v. Cohen		392 U.S. 83 (1968)	taxpayer standing
United States v. Southwestern Cable Co.		392 U.S. 157 (1968)	Administrative law
King v. Smith		392 U.S. 309 (1968)	Aid to Families with Dependent Children cannot be denied to families of qualifying children based on a substitute father
Mancusi v. DeForte		392 U.S. 364 (1968)	Fourth Amendment allows reasonable expectation of privacy to exist at workplace
Jones v. Mayer		392 U.S. 409 (1968)	housing discrimination
Epperson v. Arkansas		393 U.S. 97 (1968)	religiously motivated state law prohibiting the teaching of evolution in publicly funded schools
Tinker v. Des Moines Independent Community School District	Free Speech	393 U.S. 503 (1969)	freedom of speech in public schools
Shuttlesworth v. Birmingham		394 U.S. 147 (1969)	overbreadth of local ordinance used by city officials to ban civil rights march
Stanley v. Georgia		394 U.S. 557 (1969)	private possession of obscene material protected under First Amendment
Street v. New York		394 U.S. 576 (1969)	free speech, flag burning
Shapiro v. Thompson		394 U.S. 618 (1969)	Right to travel
Leary v. United States		395 U.S. 6 (1969)	Marihuana Tax Act of 1937 ruled unconstitutional under the Fifth Amendment
Red Lion Broadcasting Co. v. FCC		395 U.S. 367 (1969)	Fairness Doctrine, broadcaster responsibilities, freedom of speech
Brandenburg v. Ohio	Free Speech	395 U.S. 444 (1969)	freedom of speech, incitement to riot
Powell v. McCormack		395 U.S. 486 (1969)	political question doctrine, justiciability
Kramer v. Union School District		395 U.S. 621 (1969)	right to vote in a special election district
Lear, Inc. v. Adkins		395 U.S. 653 (1969)	overturning the doctrine of licensee estoppel in U.S. patent law
Chimel v. California		395 U.S. 752 (1969)	search and seizure incident to arrest
Benton v. Maryland		395 U.S. 784 (1969)	double jeopardy
