= Free speech zone =

Area set aside in public places for the purpose of political protesting

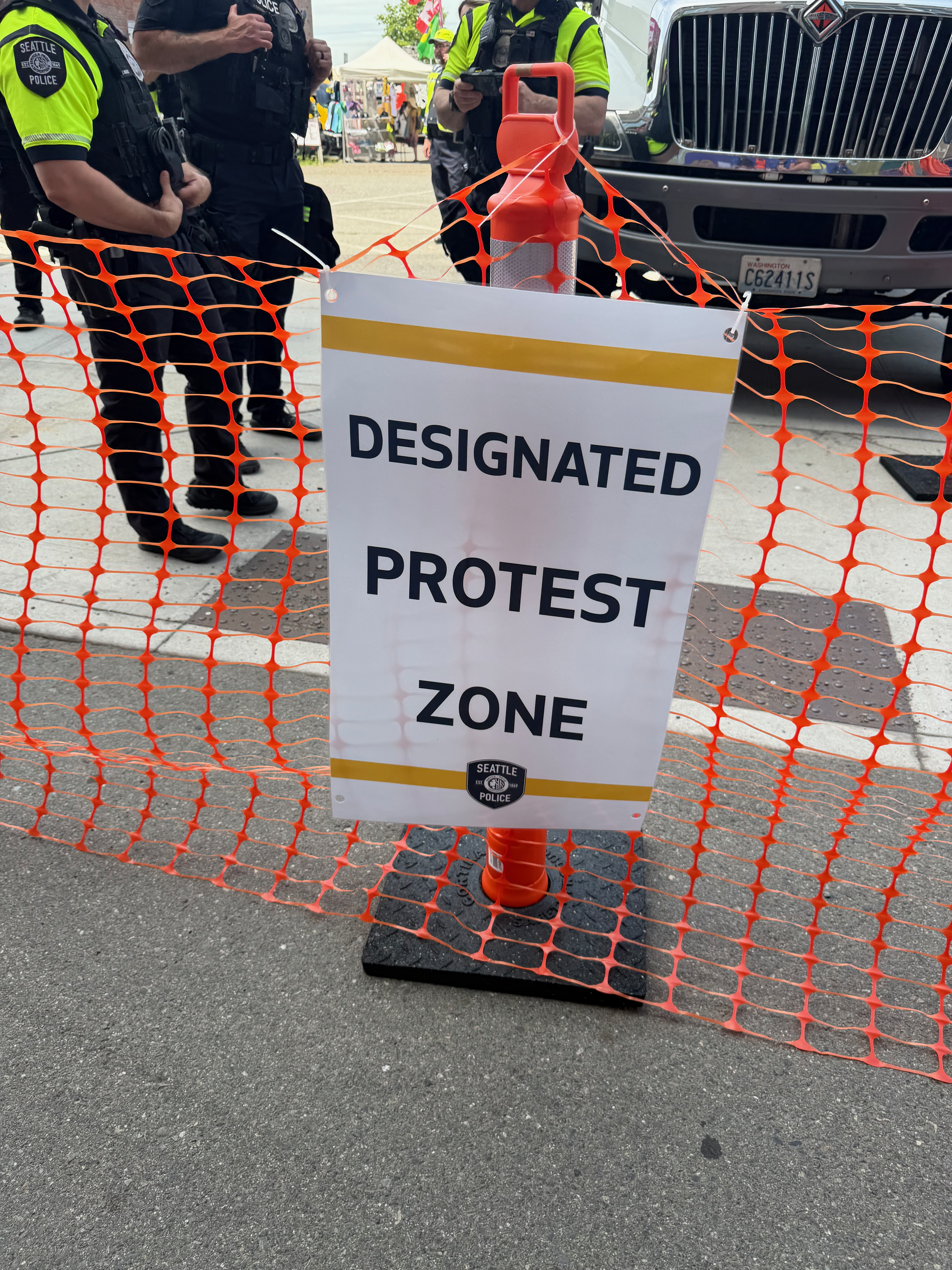
Seattle Police Department "Designated Protest Zone" sign

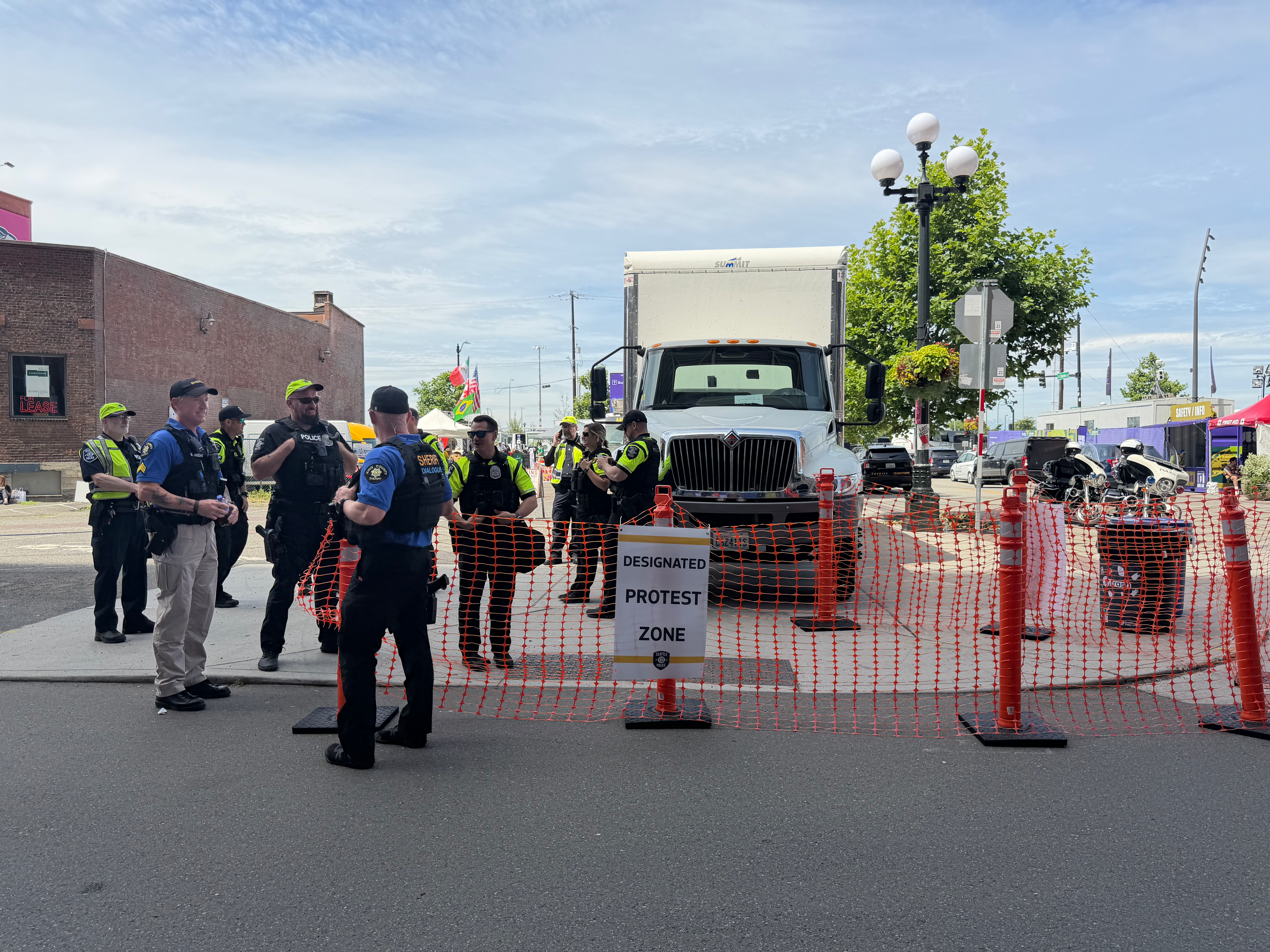
"Designated Protest Zone" outside Lumen Field at the 2026 FIFA World Cup

In the United States, free speech zones (also known as First Amendment zones, free speech cages, and protest zones) are areas set aside in public places for the purpose of political protesting. The First Amendment to the United States Constitution states that "Congress shall make no law ... abridging ... the right of the people peaceably to assemble, and to petition the Government for a redress of grievances." The existence of free speech zones is based on U.S. court decisions stipulating that the government may reasonably regulate the time, place, and manner – but not content – of expression.

Free speech zones have been used at a variety of political gatherings. The stated purpose of free speech zones is to protect the safety of those attending the political gathering, or for the safety of the protesters themselves. Critics, however, suggest that such zones are "Orwellian", and that authorities use them in a heavy-handed manner to censor protesters by putting them out of sight of the public.

Although free speech zones existed prior to the presidency of George W. Bush, it was during Bush's presidency that their scope was greatly expanded. These zones continued through the presidency of Barack Obama, who signed a bill in 2012 that expanded the power of the Secret Service to restrict speech and make arrests. Many colleges and universities earlier instituted free-speech-zone rules during the Vietnam-era protests of the 1960s and 1970s. In recent years, a number of them have revised or removed these restrictions following student protests and lawsuits, while generating debates amongst policymakers, academics, and even courts on the constitutionality and impact on discourse.

== History ==
During the 1988 Democratic National Convention, the city of Atlanta set up a "designated protest zone" so the convention would not be disrupted. A pro-choice demonstrator opposing an Operation Rescue group said Atlanta Mayor Andrew Young "put us in a free-speech cage." "Protest zones" were used during the 1992 and 1996 United States presidential nominating conventions.

Free speech zones have been used for non-political purposes. Through 1990s, the San Francisco International Airport played host to a steady stream of religious groups (Hare Krishnas in particular), preachers, and beggars. The city considered whether this public transportation hub was required to host free speech, and to what extent. As a compromise, two "free speech booths" were installed in the South Terminal, and groups wishing to speak but not having direct business at the airport were directed there. These booths still exist, although permits are required to access the booths.

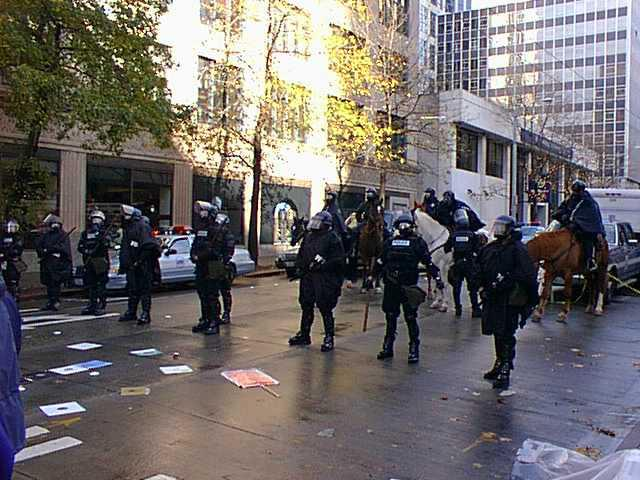
Police on Union Street in Seattle during the 1999 WTO conference. The WTO protests catalyzed a number of changes in the way law enforcement deals with protesters.

WTO Ministerial Conference of 1999 protest activity saw a number of changes to how law enforcement deals with protest activities. "The [National Lawyers] Guild, which has a 35-year history of monitoring First Amendment activity, has witnessed a notable change in police treatment of political protesters since the November 1999 World Trade Organization meeting in Seattle. At subsequent gatherings in Washington, D.C., Detroit, Philadelphia, Los Angeles, Miami, Chicago, and Portland a pattern of behavior that stifles First Amendment rights has emerged". In a subsequent lawsuit, the United States Court of Appeals for the Ninth Circuit found that "It was lawful for the city of Seattle to deem part of downtown off-limits ... But the court also said that police enforcing the rule may have gone too far by targeting only those opposed to the WTO, in violation of their First Amendment rights."

When then-President George W Bush came to Pittsburgh, Pennsylvania, on Labor Day, 2002, for a speech, the local police, acting on the request of the Secret Service, erected chain-link fence on a baseball field a third of a mile from the speech site, and proclaimed it a "designated free-speech zone."

Free speech zones were used in Boston at the 2004 Democratic National Convention. The free speech zones organized by the authorities in Boston were boxed in by concrete walls, invisible to the FleetCenter where the convention was held and criticized harshly as a "protest pen" or "Boston's Camp X-Ray". "Some protesters for a short time Monday [July 26, 2004] converted the zone into a mock prison camp by donning hoods and marching in the cage with their hands behind their backs." A coalition of groups protesting the Iraq War challenged the planned protest zones. U.S. District Court Judge Douglas Woodlock was sympathetic to their request: "One cannot conceive of what other design elements could be put into a space to create a more symbolic affront to the role of free expression.". However, he ultimately rejected the petition to move the protest zones closer to the FleetCenter.

Free speech zones were also used in New York City at the 2004 Republican National Convention. According to Mike McGuire, a columnist for the online anti-war magazine Nonviolent Activist, "The policing of the protests during the 2004 Republican National Convention represent[ed] another interesting model of repression. The NYPD tracked every planned action and set up traps. As marches began, police would emerge from their hiding places – building vestibules, parking garages, or vans – and corral the dissenters with orange netting that read 'POLICE LINE – DO not CROSS,' establishing areas they ironically called 'ad-hoc free speech zones.' One by one, protesters were arrested and detained – some for nearly two days." Both the Democratic and Republican National parties were jointly awarded a 2005 Jefferson Muzzle from the Thomas Jefferson Center for the Protection of Free Expression, "For their mutual failure to make the preservation of First Amendment freedoms a priority during the last Presidential election".

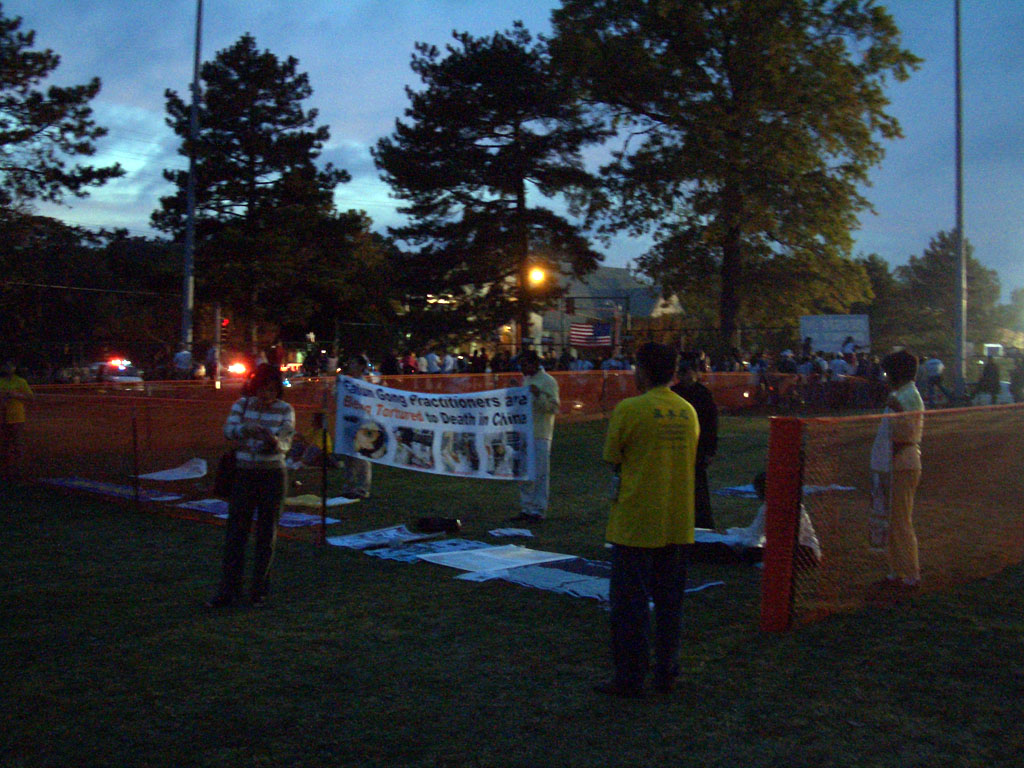
Falun Gong protesters inside a fenced-off free speech zone at the 2000 Presidential Debate at Washington University in St. Louis

Free speech zones were commonly used by President George W. Bush after the September 11 attacks and through the 2004 election. Free speech zones were set up by the Secret Service, who scouted locations where the U.S. president was scheduled to speak, or pass through. Officials targeted those who carried anti-Bush signs and escorted them to the free speech zones prior to and during the event. Reporters were often barred by local officials from displaying these protesters on camera or speaking to them within the zone. Protesters who refused to go to the free speech zone were often arrested and charged with trespassing, disorderly conduct and/or resisting arrest. A seldom-used federal law making it unlawful to "willfully and knowingly to enter or remain in ... any posted, cordoned off, or otherwise restricted area of a building or grounds where the President or other person protected by the Secret Service is or will be temporarily visiting" has also been invoked.

== Criticisms ==
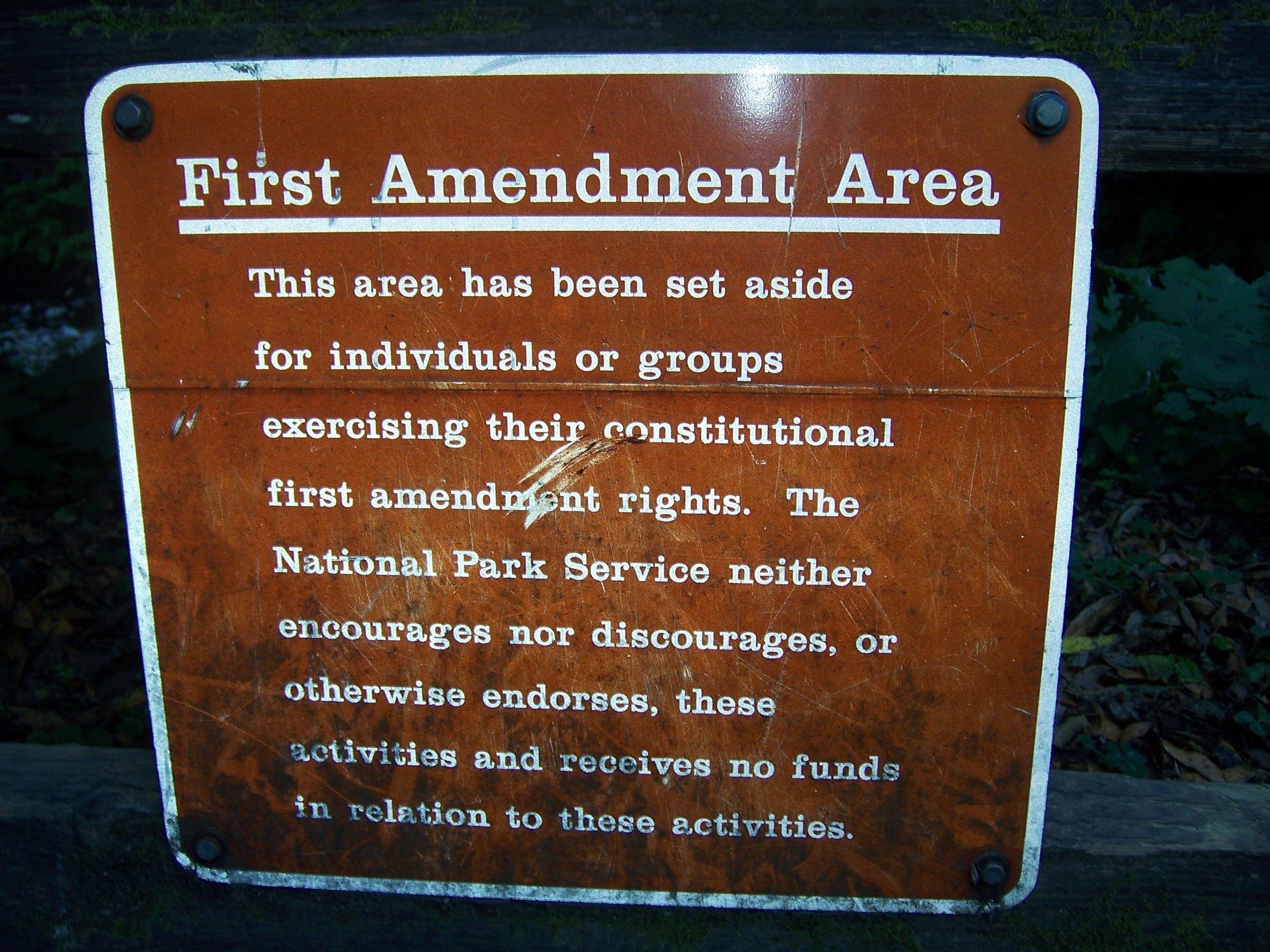
A "First Amendment Area" at the Muir Woods National Monument

Civil liberties advocates argue that free speech zones are used as a form of censorship and public relations management to conceal the existence of popular opposition from the mass public and elected officials. There is much controversy surrounding the creation of these areas – the mere existence of such zones is offensive to some people, who maintain that the First Amendment to the United States Constitution makes the entire country an unrestricted free speech zone. The Department of Homeland Security "has even gone so far as to tell local police departments to regard critics of the war on terrorism as potential terrorists themselves."

The Bush administration has been criticized by columnist James Bovard of The American Conservative for requiring protesters to stay within a designated area, while allowing supporters access to more areas. According to the Chicago Tribune, the American Civil Liberties Union has asked a federal court in Washington, D.C. to prevent the Secret Service from keeping anti-Bush protesters distant from presidential appearances while allowing supporters to display their messages up close, where they are likely to be seen by the news media.

The preliminary plan for the 2004 Democratic National Convention was criticized by the National Lawyers Guild and the ACLU of Massachusetts as being insufficient to handle the size of the expected protest. "The zone would hold as few as 400 of the several thousand protesters who are expected in Boston in late July."

In general, critics have viewed the uneven affects designated areas of protest have on the participation and message of demonstrations. Research suggests that, under the guise of safety, they shape how the protests are viewed and participated in. Separation spatially has influenced the ability for these protests to pass their message onto a wide audience. The extent to which the message reaches an audience fluctuates based on the enforcement and context of these restrictions and placements. Additionally, research on potential psychological and social effects of these practices has been done. Some studies have shown that this decreased visibility has an affect on a participant's perceived efficacy. Their willingness to be involved may decrease as their ability to exercise the First Amendment right may become less certain (Chamlee-Wright 2018).

== Notable incidents and court proceedings ==
In 1939, the United States Supreme Court found in Hague v. Committee for Industrial Organization that public streets and parks "have immemorially been held in trust for the use of the public and, time out of mind, have been used for purposes of assembly, communicating thoughts between citizens, and discussing public questions." In the later Thornhill v. Alabama case, the court found that picketing and marching in public areas is protected by the United States Constitution as free speech. However, subsequent rulings – Edwards v. South Carolina, Brown v. Louisiana, Cox v. Louisiana, and Adderley v. Florida – found that picketing is afforded less protection than pure speech due to the physical externalities it creates. Regulations on demonstrations may affect the time, place, and manner of those demonstrations, but may not discriminate based on the content of the demonstration.

The Secret Service denied targeting the president's political opponents. "Decisions made in the formulation of a security plan are based on security considerations, not political considerations", said one Secret Service spokesman.

=== Bill Neel ===
"These [free speech] zones routinely succeed in keeping protesters out of presidential sight and outside the view of media covering the event. When Bush came to the Pittsburgh area on Labor Day 2002, 65-year-old retired steel worker Bill Neel was there to greet him with a sign proclaiming, 'The Bush family must surely love the poor, they made so many of us.' The local police, at the Secret Service's behest, set up a 'designated free-speech zone' on a baseball field surrounded by a chain-link fence a third of a mile from the location of Bush's speech. The police cleared the path of the motorcade of all critical signs, though folks with pro-Bush signs were permitted to line the president's path. Neel refused to go to the designated area and was arrested for disorderly conduct. Police detective John Ianachione testified that the Secret Service told local police to confine 'people that were there making a statement pretty much against the president and his views.'" District judge Shirley Trkula threw out the charges, stating that "I believe this is America. Whatever happened to 'I don't agree with you, but I'll defend to the death your right to say it'?"

=== Brett Bursey ===
At another incident during a presidential visit to South Carolina, protester Brett Bursey refused an order by Secret Service agents to go to a free speech zone half-a-mile away. He was arrested and charged with trespassing by the South Carolina police. "Bursey said that he asked the policeman if 'it was the content of my sign,' and he said, 'Yes, sir, it's the content of your sign that's the problem.'" However, the prosecution, led by James Strom Thurmond Jr., disputes Bursey's version of events. Trespassing charges against Bursey were dropped, and Bursey was instead indicted by the federal government for violation of a federal law that allows the Secret Service to restrict access to areas visited by the president. Bursey faced up to six months in prison and a US$5,000 fine. After a bench trial, Bursey was convicted of the offense of trespassing, but judge Bristow Marchant deemed the offense to be relatively minor and ordered a fine of $500 be assessed, which Bursey appealed, and lost. In his ruling, Marchant found that "this is not to say that the Secret Service's power to restrict the area around the President is absolute, nor does the Court find that protesters are required to go to a designated demonstration area – which was an issue in this case – as long as they do not otherwise remain in a properly restricted area."

Marchant's ruling however, was criticized for three reasons:

- The ruling found that Bursey was not the victim of selective prosecution because Bursey was the only person who had refused an order to leave the area. However, this overlooks the fact that nobody else refused to leave the zone because nobody else was asked to leave.
- The prosecution claimed that the protected zone around the President was 100 yards wide. However, it was unmarked, with cars and trucks allowed to pass through and drop off ticket-holders, and nobody was willing to tell protesters where the zone's boundaries were. Marchant's decision noted this but did not find this unreasonable.
- Marchant found that in the "age of suicide bombers", the Secret Service should have latitude to get rid of anyone suspicious who is standing near the president's route. However, given that the reason Bursey was singled out by the Secret Service was his sign, "it's enough to make anyone with a dissenting view think twice before deciding to stand out from a crowd."

=== ACLU litigation ===
In 2003, the ACLU brought a lawsuit against the Secret Service, ACORN v. Secret Service, representing the Association of Community Organizations for Reform Now (ACORN). "The federal court in Philadelphia dismissed that case in March [2004] after the Secret Service acknowledged that it could not discriminate against protesters through the use of out-of-sight, out-of-earshot protest zones." Another 2003 lawsuit against the city of Philadelphia, ACORN v. Philadelphia, charged that the Philadelphia Police Department, on orders from the Secret Service, had kept protesters "further away from the site of presidential visits than Administration supporters. A high-ranking official of the Philadelphia police told ACLU of Pennsylvania Legal Director Stefan Presser that he was only following Secret Service orders." However, the court found the ACLU lacked standing to bring the case and dismissed it.

The Secret Service says it does establish 'public viewing areas' to protect dignitaries but does not discriminate against individuals based on the content of their signs or speech. 'Absolutely not,' said Tom Mazur, a spokesman for the agency created to protect the president. 'The Secret Service makes no distinction on the purpose, message or intent of any individual or group.' Civil libertarians dispute that. They cite a Corpus Christi, Texas, couple, Jeff and Nicole Rank, as an example. The two were arrested at a Bush campaign event in Charleston, West Virginia, on July 4, 2004, when they refused to take off anti-Bush shirts. Their shirts read, 'Love America, Hate Bush' ... The ACLU found 17 cases since March 2001 in which protesters were removed during events where the president or vice president appeared. And lawyers say it's an increasing trend.

According to Jeff Rank, Nicole Rank's shirt did say "Love America, Hate Bush" while Jeff Rank's shirt said "Regime change starts at home."

The incident occurred several months after the Secret Service's pledge in ACORN v. Secret Service not to discriminate against protesters. "The charges against the Ranks were ultimately dismissed in court and the mayor and city council publicly apologized for the arrest. City officials also said that local law enforcement was acting at the request of Secret Service." ACLU Senior Staff Attorney Chris Hansen pointed out that "The Secret Service has promised to not curtail the right to dissent at presidential appearances, and yet we are still hearing stories of people being blocked from engaging in lawful protest", said Hansen. "It is time for the Secret Service to stop making empty promises." The Ranks subsequently filed a lawsuit, Rank v. Jenkins, against Deputy Assistant to the President Gregory Jenkins and the Secret Service. "The lawsuit, Rank v. Jenkins, is seeking unspecified damages as well as a declaration that the actions leading to the removal of the Ranks from the Capitol grounds were unconstitutional." In August 2007, the Ranks settled their lawsuit against the Federal Government. The government paid them $80,000, but made no admission of wrongdoing. The Ranks' case against Gregory Jenkins is still pending in the District of Columbia.

As a result of ACLU subpoenas during the discovery in the Rank lawsuit, the ACLU obtained the White House's previously classified presidential advance manual. The manual gives people organizing presidential visits specific advice for preventing or obstructing protests. "There are several ways the advance person" – the person organizing the presidential visit – "can prepare a site to minimize demonstrators. First, as always, work with the Secret Service to and have them ask the local police department to designate a protest area where demonstrators can be placed, preferably not in view of the event site or motorcade route. The formation of 'rally squads' is a common way to prepare for demonstrators ... The rally squad's task is to use their signs and banners as shields between the demonstrators and the main press platform ... As a last resort, security should remove the demonstrators from the event site."

== College and university campuses ==
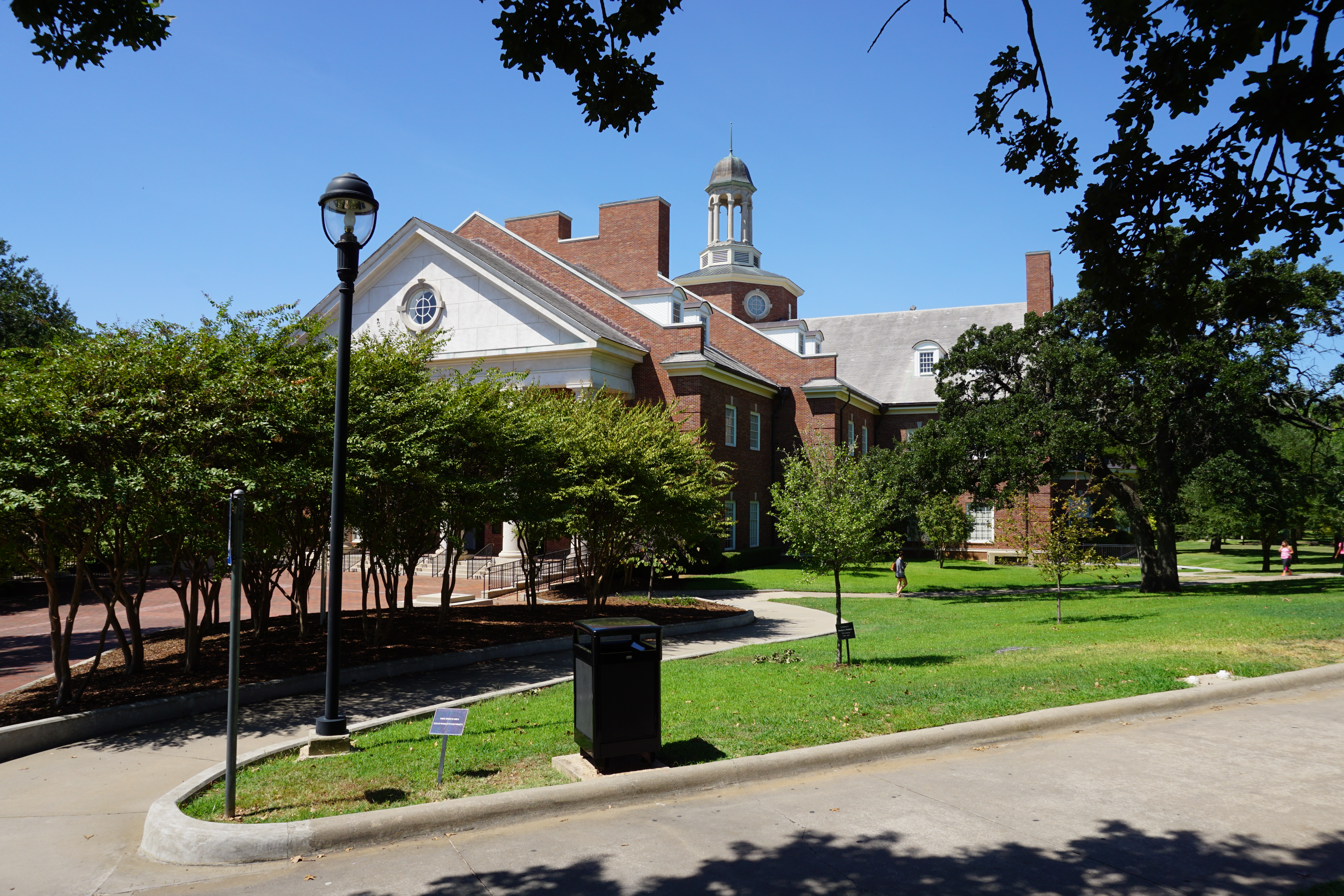
The free speech area on the campus of Texas Woman's University ...

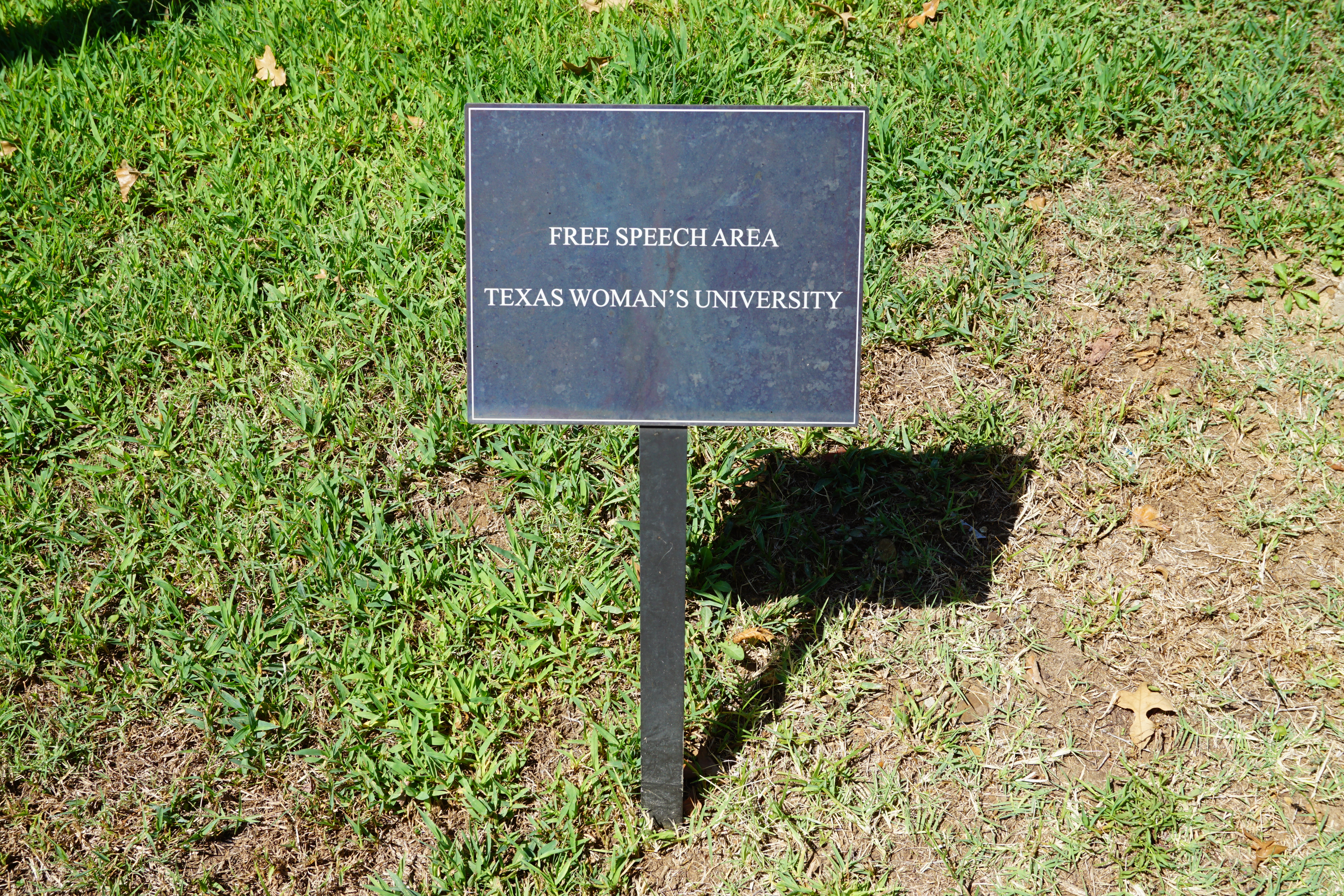
... and the sign that demarcates it

The use of free speech zones on university campuses is controversial. Many universities created on-campus free speech zones during the 1960s and 1970s, during which protests on-campus (especially against the Vietnam War) were common. Generally, the requirements are that the university is given advance notice and that they are held in locations that do not disrupt classes.

In 1968, the Supreme Court ruled in Tinker v. Des Moines Independent Community School District that non-disruptive speech is permitted in public schools. However, this does not apply to private universities. In September 2004, U.S. District Court Judge Sam Cummings struck down the free-speech-zone policy at Texas Tech University.

According to the opinion of the court, campus areas such as parks, sidewalks, streets and other areas are designated as public forums, regardless of whether the university has chosen to officially designate the areas as such. The university may open more of the campus as public forums for its students, but it cannot designate fewer areas ... Not all places within the boundaries of the campus are public forums, according to Cummings' opinion. The court declared the university's policy unconstitutional to the extent that it regulates the content of student speech in areas of the campus that are public forums.

In 2007, the Foundation for Individual Rights in Education released a survey of 346 colleges and Universities in the United States. Of those institutions, 259 (75%) maintain policies that "both clearly and substantially restrict freedom of speech."

In December 2005, the College Libertarians at the University of North Carolina at Greensboro staged a protest outside the university's designated protest zones. The specific intent of the protest was to provoke just such a charge, to "provoke the system into action into a critical review of what's going on." Two students, Allison Jaynes and Robert Sinnott, were brought up on charges under the student code of conduct of "violation of respect", for refusing to move when told to do so by a university official. The university subsequently dropped honor code charges against the students. "University officials said the history of the free-speech zones is not known. 'It predated just about everybody here", said Lucien 'Skip' Capone III, the university attorney. The policy may be a holdover from the Vietnam War and civil rights era, he said.'"

A number of colleges and universities have revised or revoked free speech zone policies in the last decade, including: Tufts University, Appalachian State University, and West Virginia University. In August 2006, Penn State University revised its seven-year-old rules restricting the rights of students to protest. "In effect, the whole campus is now a 'free-speech zone.'"

Controversies have also occurred at the University of Southern California, Indiana University, the University of Nevada, Las Vegas, and Brigham Young University.

At Marquette University, an unattributed Dave Barry quote was attached to the door of the office that graduate student Stuart Ditsler shared with three other teaching assistants. It read, "As Americans we must always remember that we all have a common enemy, an enemy that is dangerous, powerful, and relentless. I refer, of course, to the federal government." Philosophy department chairman James South ordered Ditsler to remove the quote, calling it patently offensive. South claimed that the university's free-speech zone rules required Ditsler to take it down. University spokeswoman Brigid O'Brien Miller stated that it was "a workplace issue, not one of academic freedom." Ultimately, the quote was allowed to remain, albeit with attribution.

In addition, the Louisiana State University Free Speech Alley (or Free Speech Plaza) was used in November 2015 when Louisiana gubernatorial candidate John Bel Edwards was publicly endorsed by former opponent and Republican Lt. Governor Jay Dardenne. The Consuming Fire Fellowship, a church located in rural Woodville, Mississippi, often sends members to convene at the university's Free Speech Alley to preach their views of Christianity. The members have often been met with strong resistance and resentment by the student body. Ivan Imes, a retired engineer who holds "Jesus Talks" for students at the university, said in an interview that he advised students frustrated with the preachings of the Consuming Fire Fellowship, "to give the church a break. They don't understand love. They don't understand forgiveness. There are a lot of things in the Bible that they don’t understand, or at least don’t live out."

As of March 2017, four states had passed legislation outlawing public colleges and universities from establishing free speech zones. The first state to do so was Virginia in 2014, followed by Missouri in 2015, Arizona in 2016, and Kentucky in 2017. This is an ongoing trend, with many scholars suggesting the restriction of expression conflicts with the idea that public universities are forums for open expression and discussion (Chamlee-Wright 2018)

== Other countries ==
Designated protest areas were established during the August 2007 Security and Prosperity Partnership of North America Summit in Ottawa, Canada. Although use of the areas was voluntary and not surrounded by fences, some protesters decried the use of designated protest areas, calling them "protest pens."

During the 2005 WTO Hong Kong Ministerial Conference, over 10,000 protesters were present. Wan Chai Sports Ground and Wan Chai Cargo Handling Basin were designated as protest zones. Police wielded sticks, used gas grenades and shot rubber bullets at some of the protesters. They arrested 910 people, 14 were charged, but none were convicted.

Three protest parks were designated in Beijing during the 2008 Summer Olympics, at the suggestion of the IOC. All 77 applications to protest there were withdrawn or denied, and no protests took place. Four people who applied to protest were arrested or sentenced to "re-education through labor".

In the Philippines, public spaces that are designated as free speech zones are called freedom parks. Speakers' Corner in Singapore opened in 2000 for lawful outdoor demonstrations and processions as a means of political expression.

== See also ==
- Protest permit
- Speakers' Corner
- Crowd control barrier
