= Guaranty Trust Company =

Guaranty Trust Company may refer to:

- Guaranty Trust Holding Company PLC, a multinational financial services group headquartered in Lagos, Nigeria
- Morgan Guaranty Trust, formed by the 1959 merger of the Guaranty Trust Company of New York and J.P. Morgan & Co.
- Guaranty Trust Co. v. York, a 1945 United States Supreme Court case
