= Adderley v. Florida =

- Supreme Court of the United States

Argued October 18, 1966 Decided November 14, 1966
- Full case name: Adderley, et al. v. Florida
- Citations: 385 U.S. 39 (more) 87 S. Ct. 242; 17 L. Ed. 2d 149

Case history
- Prior: Adderley v. State, 175 So. 2d 249 (Fla. 1st DCA 1965)

Holding
- Because a jail facility is not a public forum and a state may regulate the use of its property, the First Amendment rights of the protesters were not violated.

Court membership
- Chief Justice Earl Warren Associate Justices Hugo Black · William O. Douglas; Tom C. Clark · John M. Harlan II; William J. Brennan Jr. · Potter Stewart; Byron White · Abe Fortas

Case opinions
- Majority: Black, joined by Clark, Harlan, Stewart, White
- Dissent: Douglas, joined by Warren, Brennan, Fortas

Laws applied
- U.S. Const. amend. I

Adderley v. Florida, 385 U.S. 39 (1966), was a United States Supreme Court case regarding whether arrests for protesting in front of a jail were constitutional.

== Background information ==
In 1966, a group of students from Florida A&M University demonstrated against racial segregation in public theaters, and were subsequently arrested. The day after, Harriet Adderley and other FAMU students gathered outside of the Leon County jailhouse to protest their arrest. Petitioners, 32 students, were members of a group of about 200 who on a nonpublic jail driveway, which they blocked, and on adjacent county jail premises had, by singing, clapping, and dancing, demonstrated against their schoolmates' arrest and perhaps against segregation in the jail and elsewhere. The sheriff's deputy advised them that they were trespassing on county property and would have to leave or be arrested. The 107 demonstrators refusing to depart were thereafter arrested and convicted under a Florida trespass statute for "trespass with a malicious and mischievous intent." Petitioners contended that their convictions, affirmed by the Florida Circuit Court and the District Court of Appeal, deprived them of their "rights of free speech, assembly, petition, due process of law and equal protection of the laws" under the Fourteenth Amendment. After the convictions were upheld on appeal at the state level, Adderley and the other defendants petitioned the United States Supreme Court for review.

== Decision ==
The U.S. Supreme Court upheld the trespassing conviction in a 5–4 decision. The majority opinion, authored by Justice Black, argued that county jails were not public places and so it did not infringe on their right to assembly. The decision argued that states may protect their property and withhold its use from demonstrators for nondiscriminatory reasons such as protection from damage.

=== Dissenting opinion ===
Justice Douglas authored a dissenting opinion in which Chief Justice Warren and Justices Brennan and Fortas concurred. Douglas argued that the protesters did not engage in or threaten violence or block the entrance of the jail. Public officials should not, according to this vision of the First Amendment, be given discretion to decide which public places can be used for the expression of ideas.

== See also ==
- List of United States Supreme Court cases, volume 385
- List of United States Supreme Court cases by the Warren Court
- Free speech zone
  - Brown v. Louisiana
  - Cox v. Louisiana
  - Edwards v. South Carolina
