= Non-retroactivity =

Legal principle

Non-retroactivity is the legal doctrine in which laws do not apply retroactively and ex post facto laws are forbidden. This principle may be applied to judicial decisions as well as statutory law. The principle of non-retroactivity is widely recognized for international laws such as treaties, although treaties can have retroactive effect if the parties so intend. It is also widely recognized in criminal law, at least to the extent of prohibiting criminal sanctions that were not in place at the time of the crime. As a principle of criminal law it is recognized for example in the European Convention on Human Rights as well as the United States Constitution.

Legal systems vary considerably in the extent to which they apply the principle to civil and administrative laws. Legal systems also vary considerably in the extent to which court rulings on issues of law, such as the rulings of a constitutional court, have retroactive effect. The United States Supreme Court has for example often denied retroactive effect to its constitutional rulings on criminal procedure. The first such decision was in Linkletter v. Walker in 1965.

There is frequent tension between the principle of non-retroactivity and the punishment of crimes against humanity. For example, in the case of the former Chadian president Hissène Habré, the ECOWAS Court invoked the principle of non-retroactivity to bar Habré from being tried under a retroactive law in Senegal, instead requiring him to be tried in a new ad hoc court, the Extraordinary African Chambers.

Historically, the principle of non-retroactivity of statutory law emerged in the ancient Roman Republic, becoming fully established by the second century BCE. This represented an evolution from earlier conception of the legal principles (ius) as unchanging and statutes as merely clarifying this existing law. Under that earlier understanding, statutory laws had absolute and immediate effect. Over time, however, it became customary for many statutes, such as the Lex Falcidia, to explicitly disclaim retroactivity, and over time this came to be recognized as the general rule.

== See also ==
- An unjust law is no law at all
- Transitional justice
