= Lamont v. Postmaster General =

- Supreme Court of the United States

Argued April 26, 1965 Decided May 24, 1965
- Full case name: Corliss Lamont, dba Basic Pamphlets, Appellant v. Postmaster General of the United States
- Citations: 381 U.S. 301 (more) 85 S.Ct. 1493; 14 L. Ed. 2d 398; 1965 U.S. LEXIS 2286

Case history
- Prior: 229 F. Supp. 913 (S.D.N.Y. 1964); probable jurisdiction noted, 379 U.S. 926 (1964).

Holding
- The Postal Service and Federal Employees Salary Act is unconstitutional since it imposes on addressees an affirmative obligation that amounts to an unconstitutional limitation of their rights under the First Amendment.

Court membership
- Chief Justice Earl Warren Associate Justices Hugo Black · William O. Douglas; Tom C. Clark · John M. Harlan II; William J. Brennan Jr. · Potter Stewart; Byron White · Arthur Goldberg

Case opinions
- Majority: Douglas
- Concurrence: Brennan, joined by Goldberg
- Concurrence: Harlan
- White took no part in the consideration or decision of the case.

Laws applied
- U.S. Const. amend. I

Lamont v. Postmaster General, 381 U.S. 301 (1965), is a landmark First Amendment Supreme Court case, in which the ruling of the Supreme Court struck down § 305(a) of the Postal Service and Federal Employees Salary Act of 1962, a federal statute requiring the Postmaster General to detain and deliver only upon the addressee's request unsealed foreign mailings of "communist political propaganda."

== Background ==
39 U.S.C. 4008 (1964) required the U.S. Postmaster General to detain and not deliver "communist political propaganda," unless a recipient affirmatively indicated their consent to receive such materials through the mail. Dr. Corliss Lamont had a copy of the Peking Review detained and declined to respond to the government's inquiry as to whether he wished to receive the delivery. Lamont subsequently filed suit alleging that Section 4008 violated his 1st Amendment and 5th Amendment rights.

== Opinion of the court ==
The Court held:

the Act, as construed and applied, is unconstitutional, since it imposes on the addressee an affirmative obligation which amounts to an unconstitutional limitation of his rights under the First Amendment.

The Court was unanimous in the judgment (8–0, with Justice White recused). Justice Brennan wrote a concurring opinion (which Justice Goldberg joined) and Justice Harlan also wrote a concurring opinion.

== See also ==
- Chilling effect
