= Gillespie v. United States Steel Corp. =

- Supreme Court of the United States

Argued October 13, 1964 Decided December 7, 1964
- Full case name: Mabel Gillespie, Administratrix v. United States Steel Corporation
- Citations: 379 U.S. 148 (more) 85 S. Ct. 308; 13 L. Ed. 2d 199

Case history
- Prior: 321 F.2d 518 (6th Cir. 1963)

Court membership
- Chief Justice Earl Warren Associate Justices Hugo Black · William O. Douglas; Tom C. Clark · John M. Harlan II; William J. Brennan Jr. · Potter Stewart; Byron White · Arthur Goldberg

Case opinions
- Majority: Black, joined by Warren, Douglas, Clark, Brennan, White, Goldberg
- Concurrence: Stewart
- Dissent: Harlan

Gillespie v. United States Steel Corp., 379 U.S. 148 (1964), was a Supreme Court case that held that pre-trial appeals may be made on non-final issues if the trial judge, in his discretion, certifies a question of controlling law to the appellate court and the appellate court allows the appeal.

The Petitioner, the administrator of her son Daniel Gillespie's estate, brought suit against the Respondent after her son fell and drowned while working as a seaman on the Respondent's ship. The Petitioner claimed that she, as well as the decedent's dependant brother and sisters, had a right of recovery under the Jones Act and the Ohio wrongful death statute because the vessel was not seaworthy according to maritime law. She also claimed under both acts damages based on the decedent's pain and suffering.

The District Court held that the Jones Act was the only act on which the Petitioner could proceed with her claims. The District Court also struck the claims of the brother and sisters, holding that they were not beneficiaries under the Jones Act while their mother was living.

The Petitioner appealed to the Court of Appeals and the Respondent moved to dismiss the appeal asserting that the District Court had not made a final decision. The Petitioner, joined by the brother and sisters filed with the Court of Appeals a petition for a writ of mandamus ordering the District Judge to vacate his original order and enter a new one. The Court of Appeals proceeded to determine the controversy on the merits as though it were submitted on appeal and denied the petition for the writ and affirmed the District Court's order.

In light of the circumstances, the Supreme Court of the United States (Supreme Court) believed the Court of Appeals properly implemented the same policy Congress sought to promote in Section:1292(b) by treating this obviously marginal case as final and appealable.

Though the Court of Appeals review of this case could have been seen as piecemeal, it did not appear that the inconvenience and cost of trying the case was increased just because the Court of Appeals decided on the issues raised, instead of making the parties go to trial on the very same issues. There was a possibility that an injustice would befall the brother and sisters of the decedent as many years could have passed since their claim to recovery was cut off as long as the District Court's decision stood. The Supreme Court held that the questions in this case were fundamental to the further conduct of the case and the Court of Appeals handled this case properly.

Justice John Harlan (J. Harlan) dissented and argued that the Supreme Court substantially affirmed the judgment of the Court of Appeals and the parties were remanded to a trial on the merits only after they incurred needless delay and expense in consequence of the loose practices sanctioned by the Court of Appeals and by the Supreme Court. This case is an example of a vice inherent in a system, which permits piecemeal litigation in a lawsuit.

== Discussion ==
Though the Court of Appeals review of this case could have been seen as piecemeal, it did not appear that the inconvenience and cost of trying the case was increased just because the Court of Appeals decided on the issues raised, instead of making the parties go to trial on the very same issues. There was a possibility that an injustice would befall the brother and sisters of the decedent as many years could have passed since their claim to recovery was cut off as long as the District Court's decision stood. The Supreme Court held that the questions in this case were fundamental to the further conduct of the case and the Court of Appeals handled this case properly.
