= Schlagenhauf v. Holder =

- Supreme Court of the United States

Decided November 23, 1964
- Full case name: Schlagenhauf v. Holder
- Citations: 379 U.S. 104 (more)

Holding
- Rule 35 of the Federal Rules of Civil Procedure allows courts to order a defendant to submit to a medical examination.

Court membership
- Chief Justice Earl Warren Associate Justices Hugo Black · William O. Douglas; Tom C. Clark · John M. Harlan II; William J. Brennan Jr. · Potter Stewart; Byron White · Arthur Goldberg

Case opinions
- Majority: Goldberg, joined by Warren, Brennan, Stewart, White
- Concur/dissent: Black, joined by Clark
- Concur/dissent: Douglass
- Dissent: Harlan II

Schlagenhauf v. Holder, 379 U.S. 104 (1964), was a United States Supreme Court case in which the Court held that Rule 35 of the Federal Rules of Civil Procedure allows courts to order a defendant to submit to a medical examination. The case came to stand for the notion that mandamus can be appropriate when there is a recurring dispute over interpretations of the Rules.
