= United States v. Johnson (1968) =

- Supreme Court of the United States

Argued March 14, 1968 Decided April 8, 1968
- Full case name: United States v. Johnson, et al.
- Citations: 390 U.S. 563 (more) 88 S. Ct. 1231; 20 L. Ed. 2d 132; 1968 U.S. LEXIS 2001

Case history
- Prior: 269 F. Supp. 706 (N.D. Ga. 1967); probable jurisdiction noted, 389 U.S. 910 (1967).

Court membership
- Chief Justice Earl Warren Associate Justices Hugo Black · William O. Douglas; John M. Harlan II · William J. Brennan Jr. Potter Stewart · Byron White; Abe Fortas · Thurgood Marshall

Case opinions
- Majority: Douglas, joined by Warren, Brennan, White, Fortas
- Dissent: Stewart, joined by Black, Harlan
- Marshall took no part in the consideration or decision of the case.

Laws applied
- Title II of the Civil Rights Act of 1964

United States v. Johnson, 390 U.S. 563 (1968), was a United States Supreme Court case.

== Background ==
Defendants were indicted under the federal civil rights statute (18 USC 241) for a conspiracy to injure and intimidate three African Americans in the exercise of their right to patronize a restaurant under Title II of the Civil Rights Act of 1964. Defendants were outsiders not connected with the restaurant. The District Court granted a motion to dismiss the indictment on the ground that 207(b) of the Civil Rights Act of 1964 makes the provision for relief by injunction the exclusive remedy under the Act. (269 F Supp 706)

== Opinion of the Court ==
Justice Douglas reversed for a 5-3 majority. He held that the provisions of 207(b) of the Civil Rights Act of 1964 making the remedies provided in Title II of the Act the exclusive means of enforcing rights based on such part do not preclude a criminal prosecution of the defendants under 18 USC 241, since the exclusive-remedy provision applies only to enforcement of substantive rights to public accommodations against proprietors and owners, and does not purport to deal with outsiders who use violence against those who assert their rights under the Act.

=== Dissent ===
Justice Stewart dissented on the ground that the plain language of the exclusive remedies clause clearly precludes a criminal prosecution for interfering with rights secured by Title II of the Act.
