= Protest permit =

Governmental permission for a protest

A protest permit or parade permit is permission granted by a governmental agency for a demonstration to be held in a particular venue at a particular time. Failing to obtain a permit may result in charges for parading without a permit.

The requirement of a permit is sometimes denounced as an infringement of free speech, by those who perceive permits as denied on spurious grounds or used to move protestors into free speech zones. Permits are sometimes denied on grounds that the protest will create a security risk. A 2006 study in Mobilization said the available venues for protests were shrinking in number, citizens have experienced increasing difficulty in gaining unrestricted access to them, and such venues are no longer where most people typically congregate in large numbers.

== By country ==
=== France ===
In May 2021, police in Paris banned any protests in favor of Palestinian nationalism, citing "risks of disturbing public order" as a result of the "particularly sensitive international context", leading Jean-Luc-Mélenchon, leader of left-wing party La France Insoumise to declare: "France is the only country where all support protests for Palestinians are forbidden, and protests against the Israeli far-right government, it is obviously to create power incidendents and stigmatise that cause". An Amnesty International spokesperson said in response: "A forbidding of a protest is legal on an international point of view only if it is motivated for a precise threat, and only if there is no other available general restriction to maintain order".

=== United States ===
In Washington, D.C., the United States Park Police, U.S. Capitol Police, and Metropolitan Police of the District of Columbia have an elaborate permitting system.

== See also ==
- Free speech zone
- Riot control
