= NLRB v. Borg-Warner Corp. =

- Supreme Court of the United States

Decided May 5, 1958
- Full case name: NLRB v. Borg-Warner Corp.
- Citations: 356 U.S. 342 (more)

Holding
- Insisting that non-mandatory subjects must be bargained for before the acceptance of a collective bargaining agreement is an unfair labor practice.

Court membership
- Chief Justice Earl Warren Associate Justices Hugo Black · Felix Frankfurter; William O. Douglas · Harold H. Burton; Tom C. Clark · John M. Harlan II; William J. Brennan Jr. · Charles E. Whittaker

Case opinions
- Majority: Burton
- Concur/dissent: Frankfurter
- Dissent: Harlan, joined by Clark, Whittacker

Laws applied
- National Labor Relations Act

NLRB v. Borg-Warner Corp., 356 U.S. 342 (1958), was a United States Supreme Court case interpreting the National Labor Relations Act (NLRA). The Court held that an employer commits an unfair labor practice when it insists to impasse on bargaining over a permissive (non-mandatory) subject of bargaining as a condition of reaching a collective bargaining agreement. The ruling clarified the distinction between mandatory and permissive subjects under Section 8(d) of the NLRA and limited the issues that either party could lawfully insist upon during negotiations.

== Background ==
Under the NLRA, employers and unions must bargain in good faith over wages, hours, and other terms and conditions of employment, which are considered mandatory subjects. Parties may also discuss permissive subjects, but neither side may insist on them as a condition of agreement.

The dispute in Borg-Warner arose after the employer conditioned agreement on the union’s acceptance of a "ballot" clause that the National Labor Relations Board (NLRB) considered a permissive subject.

== Facts of the case ==
During negotiations, Borg-Warner proposed a clause requiring employees to vote by secret ballot before selecting the union as their representative. The union rejected the proposal, and the employer insisted the clause be included before finalizing the contract. The NLRB found that insistence on the clause constituted a refusal to bargain in good faith.

== Description ==
Essentially, the opinion of the Court was that the NLRA's good faith bargaining clause required employers to agree to contracts where the remaining disputes were over non-mandatory subjects. In dissent, Harlan contended that the Act had no such affirmative requirement. His reading of the statute was that it did not prohibit good-faith bargaining over non-mandatory subjects.

The NLRB and courts determined which aspects of a contract were non-mandatory. Therefore, in practice, courts could hold that certain subjects were non-mandatory and the Borg-Warner rule would prevent those subjects from being included in union contracts at all.
