= Benjamin Elton Cox =

Benjamin Elton Cox (June 19, 1931 – June 12, 2011) was an American civil rights movement activist and preacher. Cox participated in the 1961 Freedom Riders protest and was interviewed in the 2010 film of the same name.

== Personal life and education ==
Cox was a native of Whiteville, Tennessee. He was a popular preacher in the area and received the name "Beltin' Elton" during the course of his freedom rides.

Cox was the seventh born of his parents' sixteen children. Cox later moved to Kankakee, Illinois at the age of five.

He did not complete high school, rather he worked for 18 months cleaning shoes to support his family financially. Later in 1950 he was able to get his diploma from Joliet Township High School at the age of twenty. He later went on to attend Livingstone College, an A.M.E. Zion institution in the city of Salisbury, North Carolina. He completed his time in Livingstone College in 1954 after getting a major in sociology and a minor in history. After his time at Livingstone College, he studied a divinity degree at Howard, and spent a year as a visiting student at a seminary in Cambridge, Massachusetts.

== Preaching and the civil rights movement ==
After his ordination in 1958, he became a pastor of Pilgrim Congregational Church in High Point, North Carolina.

Cox quickly gained a reputation for being a strong supporter of the civil rights movement. He started desegregation efforts in local schools, serving as an advisor for NAACP Youth Council, and participating as an observer for the American Friends Service Committee.

After the Greensboro sit-ins in February 1960, he encouraged local students to participate in their own sit-ins, under the condition they stay non-violent.

Cox views on being nonviolent were very strong. He soon caught the attention of the national NAACP leaders, including James Farmer. Farmer hired Cox to help stump the south.

Shortly after Farmer hired Cox, Farmer became executive director of CORE. Cox soon received a call from Farmer, wanting to know if Cox would be willing to join the Freedom Rides due to his background as being an ordained minister. Cox agreed and showed up in Washington wearing formal clothing, in case anyone was questioning if the Ride lacked divine guidance.

Cox was one of the two ordained ministers, the other being J. Metz Rollins from Nashville. Rollins soon had to bow out leaving Cox as the only preacher and John Lewis as the sole representative of the Nashville Student Movement.

To parallel the efforts of CORE field secretaries, Cox traveled across the South during the Spring and Summer of 1960. Cox was spreading the gospel of nonviolence to students. Many student activists were accepting of the message. Despite the many instances of white supremacists provoking violence, the sit-ins continued without a violent race war that many predicted would occur.

In the summer of 1961, he participated in the CORE Freedom Ride from Missouri to Louisiana on July 8–15, 1961. He defended his actions in the Freedom Ride by stating in the film Freedom Riders, "If men like Governor Patterson [of Alabama] and Governor Barnett of Mississippi... would carry out the good oath of their office, then people would be able to travel in this country. Then people in Tel Aviv and Moscow and London would not pick up their newspaper for breakfast and realize that America is not living up to the dream of liberty and justice for all."

In December 1961, Cox was arrested in Baton Rouge, Louisiana and convicted of disturbing the peace. That conviction was appealed and upheld by the Louisiana Supreme Court, but overturned by the Supreme Court in Cox v. Louisiana. The Supreme Court held that state government cannot employ "breach of the peace" statutes against protesters engaging in peaceable demonstrations that may potentially incite violence.

Cox was arrested seventeen times over the course of a few decades.

== Later life ==
Prior to retirement, he served as minister for Pilgrim Congregational Church in High Point, North Carolina. He later worked as chaplain at the VA Hospital in Urbana, Illinois, and finally, as a middle school counselor in Jackson, Tennessee. Cox died in June 2011, one week before his 80th birthday.
