= Fibreboard Paper Products Corp. v. NLRB =

- Supreme Court of the United States

Decided December 14, 1964
- Full case name: Fibreboard Paper Products Corp. v. NLRB
- Citations: 379 U.S. 203 (more)

Holding
- Using independent contractors to replace all maintenance workers without consulting the union bargaining representative of those employees violates the National Labor Relations Act.

Court membership
- Chief Justice Earl Warren Associate Justices Hugo Black · William O. Douglas; Tom C. Clark · John M. Harlan II; William J. Brennan Jr. · Potter Stewart; Byron White · Arthur Goldberg

Laws applied
- National Labor Relations Act

Fibreboard Paper Products Corp. v. NLRB, 379 U.S. 203 (1964), was a United States Supreme Court case in which the Court held that using independent contractors to replace all maintenance workers without consulting the union bargaining representative of those employees violates the National Labor Relations Act.
