= Guaranty Trust Co. v. York =

- Supreme Court of the United States

Argued January 3–4, 1945 Decided June 18, 1945
- Full case name: Guaranty Trust Co. v. York
- Citations: 326 U.S. 99 (more) 65 S. Ct. 1464; 89 L. Ed. 2079; 1945 U.S. LEXIS 2665; 160 A.L.R. 1231

Case history
- Prior: Certiorari to the United States Court of Appeals for the Second Circuit

Holding
- The state statute of limitations applies if it substantially affects the outcome of the case.

Court membership
- Chief Justice Harlan F. Stone Associate Justices Owen Roberts · Hugo Black; Stanley F. Reed · Felix Frankfurter; William O. Douglas · Frank Murphy; Robert H. Jackson · Wiley B. Rutledge

Case opinions
- Majority: Frankfurter, joined by Stone, Black, Reed, Jackson
- Dissent: Rutledge, joined by Murphy
- Roberts and Douglas took no part in the consideration or decision of the case.

Guaranty Trust Co. v. York, 326 U.S. 99 (1945), was a United States Supreme Court decision applying the Erie doctrine to state statutes of limitations. The Court held that a federal court hearing a state-law claim in equity under diversity jurisdiction must apply the state's statute of limitations if it would bar recovery in state court.

== Background ==
Guaranty Trust Company was the trustee for notes issued by the Van Sweringen Corporation. When the corporation could no longer meet its obligations, Guaranty Trust backed an offer to exchange the notes for cash and stock. York received some of the notes as a gift after the offer closed. In 1942, she filed a class action on behalf of noteholders who had not accepted the offer. She alleged that Guaranty Trust had failed to protect their interests and disclose its own interest in the exchange.

The district court granted summary judgment to Guaranty Trust based on an earlier suit brought by noteholders who had accepted the offer. The Second Circuit reversed, holding that a federal court sitting in equity could disregard New York's statute of limitations in a diversity case.

== Decision of the Court ==
Writing for the Court, Justice Felix Frankfurter reasoned that a federal court hearing a state-law claim under diversity jurisdiction should ask whether disregarding a state rule would substantially change the result compared with the same suit in state court. This became known as the outcome-determinative test under Erie.

The Court reversed the Second Circuit and remanded the case. It left open whether the New York statute actually barred York's suit.

Justice Wiley Rutledge, joined by Justice Frank Murphy, dissented. He would have had the Second Circuit decide whether New York law barred the suit before addressing the broader question of whether federal courts sitting in equity had to follow state statutes of limitations.

== Later cases ==
In Byrd v. Blue Ridge Rural Electric Cooperative, Inc. (1958), the Court held that the federal interest in having juries decide disputed facts could outweigh the risk of a different outcome in state court. In Hanna v. Plumer (1965), the Court explained that the test should be applied in light of the Erie doctrine's aims of discouraging forum shopping and avoiding unequal treatment of litigants.
