= List of United States Supreme Court cases, volume 356 =

This is a list of all the United States Supreme Court cases from volume 356 of the United States Reports:

Case name	Citation	Date decided
Northern P.R.R. Co. v. United States	356 U.S. 1	1958
American Motors Corp. v. Kenosha	356 U.S. 21	1958
Zivnostenska Banka v. Stephen	356 U.S. 22	1958
Houston Belt & Terminal R.R. Co. v. United States	356 U.S. 23	1958
Marshall v. Brucker	356 U.S. 24	1958
Howard v. United States	356 U.S. 25	1958
Shelton v. United States	356 U.S. 26	1958
Commissioner v. Sullivan	356 U.S. 27	1958
Tank Truck Rentals, Inc. v. Commissioner	356 U.S. 30	1958
Hoover Motor Express Co. v. United States	356 U.S. 38	1958
Ferguson v. St. Louis-San Francisco R.R. Co.	356 U.S. 41	1958
Hurley v. Ragen	356 U.S. 42	1958
CBS v. Loew's Inc.	356 U.S. 43	1958
Forman v. Apfel	356 U.S. 43	1958
Perez v. Brownell	356 U.S. 44	1958
Trop v. Dulles	356 U.S. 86	1958
Nishikawa v. Dulles	356 U.S. 129	1958
Brown v. United States (1958)	356 U.S. 148	1958
Green v. United States	356 U.S. 165	1958
Peoria Transit Lines, Inc. v. Peoria	356 U.S. 225	1958
Cantwell v. Cantwell	356 U.S. 225	1958
Pratt v. Department of the Army	356 U.S. 226	1958
Strong v. United States	356 U.S. 226	1958
United States v. F. & M. Schaefer Brewing Co.	356 U.S. 227	1958
Grimes v. Raymond Concrete Pile Co.	356 U.S. 252	1958
Matles v. United States	356 U.S. 256	1958
United States v. Diamond	356 U.S. 257	1958
Mendoza-Martinez v. Mackey	356 U.S. 258	1958
Dandridge v. United States	356 U.S. 259	1958
Commissioner v. P. G. Lake, Inc.	356 U.S. 260	1958
Dessalernos v. Savoretti	356 U.S. 269	1958
Butler v. Whiteman	356 U.S. 271	1958
Georgia v. United States	356 U.S. 273	1958
Fidelity-Philadelphia Trust Co. v. Smith	356 U.S. 274	1958
Denver Union Stock Yard Co. v. Producers Livestock Marketing Ass'n	356 U.S. 282	1958
Panama Canal Co. v. Grace Line, Inc.	356 U.S. 309	1958
Alaska Industrial Bd. v. Chugach Elec. Ass'n, Inc.	356 U.S. 320	1958
Sinkler v. Missouri P.R.R. Co.	356 U.S. 326	1958
Jung v. K. & D. Mining Co.	356 U.S. 335	1958
New Yorker Magazine, Inc. v. Gerosa	356 U.S. 339	1958
van Newkirk v. McNeill	356 U.S. 339	1958
Philyaw v. Arkansas	356 U.S. 340	1958
Caine v. California	356 U.S. 340	1958
Pogor v. New York	356 U.S. 341	1958
Teamsters v. Newell	356 U.S. 341	1958
NLRB v. Borg-Warner Corp.	356 U.S. 342	1958
Yates v. United States	356 U.S. 363	1958
Ratner v. United States	356 U.S. 368	1958
Sherman v. United States	356 U.S. 369	1958
Masciale v. United States	356 U.S. 386	1958
Thomas v. Arizona	356 U.S. 390	1958
United States v. Cores	356 U.S. 405	1958
Marin Cnty. v. United States	356 U.S. 412	1958
Public Serv. Comm'n v. United States	356 U.S. 421	1958
Hoag v. New Jersey	356 U.S. 464	1958
Federal Maritime Bd. v. Isbrandtsen Co.	356 U.S. 481	1958
Byrd v. Blue Ridge Rural Elec. Cooperative, Inc.	356 U.S. 525	1958
Payne v. Arkansas	356 U.S. 560	1958
Ciucci v. Illinois	356 U.S. 571	1958
Sacher v. United States	356 U.S. 576	1958
Babcock v. California	356 U.S. 581	1958
North Western-Hanna Fuel Co. v. United States	356 U.S. 581	1958
Porchetta v. Ohio	356 U.S. 582	1958
New York Trap Rock Corp. v. Clarkstown	356 U.S. 582	1958
Alhambra Gold Mine Corp. v. Alhambra-Shumway Mines, Inc.	356 U.S. 583	1958
Browning v. Kansas	356 U.S. 583	1958
Eubanks v. Louisiana	356 U.S. 584	1958
Rainwater v. United States	356 U.S. 590	1958
United States v. McNinch	356 U.S. 595	1958
Kovacs v. Brewer	356 U.S. 604	1958
Machinists v. Gonzales	356 U.S. 617	1958
Automobile Workers v. Russell	356 U.S. 634	1958
Nowak v. United States	356 U.S. 660	1958
Maisenberg v. United States	356 U.S. 670	1958
Ellis v. United States	356 U.S. 674	1958
Amlin v. Verbeem	356 U.S. 676	1958
United States v. Procter & Gamble Co.	356 U.S. 677	1958
Bonetti v. Rogers	356 U.S. 691	1958
Hill v. United States	356 U.S. 704	1958
