= Beck v. Ohio =

- Supreme Court of the United States

Argued October 15, 1964 Decided November 23, 1964
- Full case name: Beck v Ohio
- Citations: 379 U.S. 89 (more) 85 S. Ct. 223; 13 L. Ed. 2d 142

Holding
- No probable cause for petitioner's arrest having been shown, the arrest, and therefore necessarily the search for and seizure of the slips incident thereto, were invalid under the Fourth and Fourteenth Amendments

Court membership
- Chief Justice Earl Warren Associate Justices Hugo Black · William O. Douglas; Tom C. Clark · John M. Harlan II; William J. Brennan Jr. · Potter Stewart; Byron White · Arthur Goldberg

Case opinions
- Majority: Stewart, joined by Warren, Douglas, Brennan, White, Goldberg
- Dissent: Clark, joined by Black
- Dissent: Harlan

Laws applied
- U.S. Const. amend. IV

Beck v. Ohio, 379 U.S. 89 (1964), is a United States Supreme Court decision concerning evidence obtained by a search incidental to a good-faith warrantless arrest. Reversing the Ohio Supreme Court's decision, the U.S Supreme Court held that the record did not show facts sufficient for the Court to find that Ohio police arrested defendant with probable cause, so the criminally-punishable evidence found on his person during an incidental search was inadmissible. Accordingly, the Court vacated defendant's conviction.

== Facts ==
Receiving unspecified "information" and "reports" concerning William Beck and his current whereabouts, policemen in Cleveland, Ohio stopped him in his automobile and placed him under arrest without a warrant on November 10, 1961, for "a clearing house operation, scheme of chance." As incidental to arrest, they searched, firstly, his car and found nothing noteworthy. At the police station, however, they searched his person and discovered, "beneath the sock of his leg," an envelope containing a number of clearing house slips, a then-illegal possession in Ohio for which he was charged in Cleveland Municipal Court.

Beck filed a motion to suppress the slips, arguing that they were seized in violation of the Fourth and Fourteenth Amendments, but the Ohio Courts overruled after a hearing. Beck was eventually convicted at trial, with the slips being the primary basis of that verdict. On appeal, both the Ohio Court of Appeals and the Ohio Supreme Court (the highest in the state) affirmed his conviction on the belief that the searches were part of a lawful arrest and thus valid, despite the lack of a warrant.

== Question ==
Did the policeman's arrest and incidental search of William Beck person violate Beck's rights under the Fourth Amendment and Fourteenth Amendment, and if so, should the criminally-punishable slips be suppressed as evidence?

== Holding ==
The majority (Stewart, joined by Warren, Douglas, Brennan, White, Goldberg) overturned the Ohio Supreme Court ruling, invalidating the arrest and all evidence obtained therefrom. They found that the policemen's justification for the arrest (especially their description of the informer) was too vague and that their suspicion relied too much on Beck's prior arrests and convictions. The Court concluded that the "record in this case does not contain a single objective fact to support a belief by the officers that the petitioner was engaged in criminal activity at the time they arrested him."

The court did acknowledge that the policemen may have received information from someone, but they felt the prosecution "needed to show with considerably more specificity" what the information said, who the informer was, and why the police found the informer reliable. Otherwise, a showing of probable cause was absent. On that note, Justice Potter Stewart concluded thus: "We may assume that the officers acted in good faith. But good faith on the part of the arresting officer is not enough. If subjective good faith alone were the test, the protections of the Fourth Amendment would evaporate, and the people would be secure in their persons, houses, papers, and effects, only in the discretion of the police."

The Supreme Court had three dissenters, Justice Clark, Justice Black, and Justice Harlan. Clark, with Black joining, contended that the U.S. Supreme Court should honor the probable cause determination of any State's highest court, else "this Court will be continually disputing with state and federal courts over the minutiae of facts in every search and seizure case." Justice Harlan's argument was that the police had probable cause because the informer, however vague his identity and information were, said that Beck would be at "East 115th Street and Beulah," and the police did, indeed, find Beck at such place. This correspondence, Harlan felt, was enough to establish informer's reliability and, thus, enough to establish probable cause. Clark, Black, and Harlan would have affirmed Beck's conviction.
