= Stanford v. Texas =

- Supreme Court of the United States

Argued November 12, 1964 Decided January 18, 1965
- Full case name: Stanford v. Texas
- Citations: 379 U.S. 476 (more) 85 S. Ct. 506, 13 L. Ed. 2d 431, 1965 U.S. LEXIS 2380

Case history
- Prior: Cert. granted, 377 U.S. 989 (1964).

Holding
- The protections of the Fourth Amendment are by the Fourteenth Amendment guaranteed against invasion by the States, and the States may not constitutionally issue general warrants which do not describe with particularity the things to be seized, a requirement of the most scrupulous exactitude where the seizure also impinges upon First Amendment freedoms.

Court membership
- Chief Justice Earl Warren Associate Justices Hugo Black · William O. Douglas; Tom C. Clark · John M. Harlan II; William J. Brennan Jr. · Potter Stewart; Byron White · Arthur Goldberg

Case opinion
- Majority: Stewart, joined by unanimous

Laws applied
- Fourth Amendment to the United States Constitution

Stanford v. Texas, 379 U.S. 476 (1965), is a major decision of the Supreme Court of the United States. It stated in clear terms that, pursuant to the Fourteenth Amendment, the Fourth Amendment rules regarding search and seizure applied to state governments. While this principle had been outlined in other cases, such as Mapp v. Ohio, this case added another level of constitutional consideration for the issuance of search warrants when articles of expression, protected by the First Amendment, are among the items to be taken. In effect, when a state issues a warrant that includes the order to seize books, it must accord the "most scrupulous exactitude" to the language of the Fourth Amendment.

== Background ==
The petitioner, John William Stanford, Jr., operated a mail-order book business, "All Points of View", out of his private residence in San Antonio, Texas. On December 27, 1963, Texas law enforcement officers—several Bexar County deputies and two assistant attorneys general—appeared at Stanford's home with a warrant to search the premises. This warrant had been issued by a local magistrate for the purpose of seizing any books, lists, receipts, pictures, or other such effects related to the Communist Party of Texas, an organization that had been declared unlawful by a piece of Texas legislation known as the "Suppression Act", also known as the Texas Communist Control Law. Among other provisions, the Suppression Act made it illegal to possess writings, recordings or photographs relating to the Communist Party of Texas, each instance of such possession potentially bringing a prison sentence of 20 years.

Stanford was not home at the time officers arrived, but his wife allowed police into the home after being read the warrant. Officers evidently tried to locate Stanford without success before beginning their search. This search lasted around five hours. When the search was completed, officers had, in total, seized approximately 2,000 of Stanford's books, pamphlets, and papers, which were then packed into 14 cartons and sent to an investigator's office in the county courthouse. In the entire collection of seized material, investigators did not find any articles related to the Communist Party of Texas. Many of the seized books had been, in fact, intended for sale in Stanford's home business and included "such diverse writers as Karl Marx, Jean-Paul Sartre, Theodore Draper, Fidel Castro, Earl Browder, Pope John XXIII, and Mr. Justice Hugo Black."

Also among the seized items was an array of Stanford's private documents, insurance policies, personal correspondence, and even his marriage certificate. Due to this fact, and the fact that the investigation had yielded no evidence of criminal activity, Stanford filed a motion with the magistrate who had issued the warrant, requesting that the warrant be annulled and his property be returned. After a hearing, Stanford's motion was denied without further comment from the court. By statute, the decision of the local court was final on this matter, leaving only the supreme court as an avenue of appeal. The court granted certiorari and heard arguments on November 12, 1964.

John Stanford helped organize the San Antonio Committee to Free Angela Davis in the early 1970s and still lived in San Antonio until his death in 2013. He was also active for many years in the peace movement and with black communist John Inman of San Antonio. Stanford established relationships with SNCC, the Black Panthers, and other groups active in the San Antonio area.

== Opinion of the Court ==
On January 18, 1965, Justice Potter Stewart delivered the unanimous opinion of the Court. Demonstrating the strength of the agreement among the justices, the court stated that it would not even consider the majority of Stanford's arguments against the warrant, stating it needed just one of his objections to determine that the search had been unconstitutional. Namely, the court found the warrant issued was a general warrant, something that the Fourth Amendment had been created specifically to prevent. Such a warrant required only the reasonable belief of wrongdoing, and granted law enforcement officials considerable leeway in what they were allowed to seize as evidence of a crime. The court quoted Revolutionary War-era figure James Otis; regarding writs of assistance, Otis remarks, "[they are] the worst instrument of arbitrary power ... that ever was found in an English law book... [placing] the liberty of every man in the hands of every petty officer."

Much of the court's opinion pertains to the history of warrants, and the constitutional interest in preventing warrants that are too broad in scope. Justice Stewart felt it would be a “needless exercise in pedantry to review again the detailed history of the use of general warrants as instruments of oppression from the time of the Tudors, through the Star Chamber, the Long Parliament, the Restoration, and beyond.” Nevertheless, the Court's discussion of this history comprises more than half of the unquoted text of the opinion.

Justice Steward focuses closely on the English Court of King’s Bench case Entick v Carrington (1765), which rejected a search warrant against a bookseller for seditious libel. Calling Lord Camden’s opinion the “wellspring” of the Fourth Amendment, Justice Steward draws the King’s overreach there in close parallel with Texas’s search of John Stanford here.

Near the end of the Court's opinion, it summarizes its purpose in discussing history at such length:

In short, what this history indispensably teaches is that the constitutional requirement that warrants must particularly describe the 'things to be seized' is to be accorded the most scrupulous exactitude when the 'things' are books, and the basis for their seizure is the ideas which they contain.

The magistrate's order was vacated, and the case was remanded to lower court for its final disposition, consistent with the ruling above.

== See also ==
- List of United States Supreme Court cases, volume 379
