= Brown v. Louisiana =

- Supreme Court of the United States

Argued December 6, 1965 Decided February 23, 1966
- Full case name: Brown, et al. v. City of Louisiana, et al.
- Citations: 383 U.S. 131 (more) 86 S. Ct. 719; 15 L. Ed. 2d 637; 1966 U.S. LEXIS 2845

Case history
- Prior: State v. Brown, 246 La. 878, 168 So. 2d 104 (1964); cert. granted, 381 U.S. 901 (1965).

Holding
- States may only regulate the use of public facilities in a "reasonably nondiscriminatory manner, equally applicable to all." Maintaining separate library facilities clearly violated this principle.

Court membership
- Chief Justice Earl Warren Associate Justices Hugo Black · William O. Douglas; Tom C. Clark · John M. Harlan II; William J. Brennan Jr. · Potter Stewart; Byron White · Abe Fortas

Case opinions
- Plurality: Fortas, joined by Warren, Douglas
- Concurrence: Brennan
- Concurrence: White
- Dissent: Black, joined by Clark, Harlan, Stewart

Laws applied
- U.S. Const. amend. I

Brown v. Louisiana, 383 U.S. 131 (1966), was a United States Supreme Court case based on the First Amendment in the U.S. Constitution. It held that protesters have a First and Fourteenth Amendment right to engage in a peaceful sit-in at a public library. Justice Fortas wrote the plurality opinion and was joined by Justice Douglas and Justice Warren. Justices Brennan and Byron White concurred. Justices Black, Clark, Harlan and Stewart dissented.

== Background ==
In order to protest their denial of their right to equal treatment guaranteed by the Constitution, five African-Americans entered the Audubon Regional Library. Audubon Regional Library is a public library in Clinton, Louisiana. There was no one else in the library room except the library assistant. One of the African-Americans (Brown) requested a book, and upon checking, the library assistant informed Brown that they did not have the book, and that she would request it from the State Library. (The book was later mailed to him with instructions for its return). The library assistant then asked them to leave, but instead for the purpose of maintaining their silent protest against the library's policy of segregation, Brown sat down and the others stood around him. There was no noise or boisterous talking. 10 to 15 minutes after they had entered the library, the sheriff and deputies arrived, and they were arrested. They were charged under the Louisiana breach of the peace statute, which makes it a crime to "with intent to provoke a breach of the peace, or under circumstances such that a breach of the peace may be occasioned thereby" or to crowd in a public place and refuse to disperse.

Justice Fortas and Justice Black each included a summary of the events in their opinions. Justice Fortas' summary for the majority is more concise than Justice Black's in his dissent.

== Decision ==
Justice Abe Fortas wrote the plurality opinion, joined by Chief Justice Warren, and Justice Douglas, with Justices Brennan and White writing concurring opinions. Fortas concluded that there was no evidence to support the use of the breach of the peace statute, and that the protest was considerably less disruptive than earlier situations that the Court had invalidated convictions—including Cox v. Louisiana.

== Dissent ==
Justice Black, in his dissent, finds nothing preventing Louisiana from banning sit-in demonstrations, and criticises the majority opinion for acting as if Louisiana had intended to deny access to the libraries based upon race. Black also noted that when Brown asked for a book, he was served. Thus showing that he was not denied access or service, and discussed that there was no racial discrimination on the part of the library.

== See also ==
- List of United States Supreme Court cases, volume 383
- Cox v. Louisiana
- Adderley v. Florida
- Edwards v. South Carolina
