= List of United States Supreme Court cases, volume 390 =

This is a list of all the United States Supreme Court cases from volume 390 of the United States Reports:

- Hardin v. Kentucky Util. Co., 390 U.S. 1 (1968)
- Schneider v. Smith, 390 U.S. 17 (1968)
- Epton v. New York, 390 U.S. 29 (1968) (per curiam)
- Knight v. Board of Regents, 390 U.S. 36 (1968) (per curiam)
- Paulaitis v. Paulaitis, 390 U.S. 36 (1968) (per curiam)
- Wetter v. City of Indianapolis, 390 U.S. 37 (1968) (per curiam)
- Bogart v. State Bar, 390 U.S. 37 (1968) (per curiam)
- Cross v. United States Bd. of Parole, 390 U.S. 38 (1968) (per curiam)
- Crepeault v. Vermont, 390 U.S. 38 (1968) (per curiam)
- Marchetti v. United States, 390 U.S. 39 (1968)
- Grosso v. United States, 390 U.S. 62 (1968)
- Haynes v. United States, 390 U.S. 85 (1968)
- Provident Tradesmens Bank & Trust Co. v. Patterson, 390 U.S. 102 (1968)
- Smith v. Illinois, 390 U.S. 129 (1968)
- Kolod v. United States, 390 U.S. 136 (1968) (per curiam)
- Teitel Film Corp. v. Cusack, 390 U.S. 139 (1968) (per curiam)
- Smith v. Noble Drilling Corp., 390 U.S. 143 (1968) (per curiam)
- Garafolo v. United States, 390 U.S. 144 (1968) (per curiam)
- Albrecht v. Herald Co., 390 U.S. 145 (1968)
- United States v. Third Nat. Bank in Nashville, 390 U.S. 171 (1968) (per curiam)
- Rainwater v. Florida, 390 U.S. 196 (1968)
- Roberts v. Warden, Md. Penitentiary, 390 U.S. 196 (1968)
- Lee v. Kansas City, 390 U.S. 197 (1968) (per curiam)
- Wynn v. Byrne, 390 U.S. 197 (1968) (per curiam)
- Argo v. Alabama, 390 U.S. 198 (1968) (per curiam)
- Robison v. United States, 390 U.S. 198 (1968) (per curiam)
- Justice v. United States, 390 U.S. 199 (1968) (per curiam)
- Jones v. Russell, 390 U.S. 199 (1968) (per curiam)
- DeCesare v. United States, 390 U.S. 200 (1968) (per curiam)
- Costello v. United States, 390 U.S. 201 (1968) (per curiam)
- Piccioli v. United States, 390 U.S. 202 (1968) (per curiam)
- Forgett v. United States, 390 U.S. 203 (1968) (per curiam)
- Ortega v. Michigan, 390 U.S. 204 (1968) (per curiam)
- Stone v. United States, 390 U.S. 204 (1968) (per curiam)
- Anderson v. Georgia, 390 U.S. 206 (1968) (per curiam)
- SEC v. New England Elec. System, 390 U.S. 207 (1968)
- United States v. Habig, 390 U.S. 222 (1968)
- United States v. Neifert-White Co., 390 U.S. 228 (1968)
- Harris v. United States, 390 U.S. 234 (1968) (per curiam)
- Federal Maritime Comm'n v. Aktiebolaget Svenska Amerika Linien, 390 U.S. 238 (1968)
- NLRB v. United Ins. Co. of America, 390 U.S. 254 (1968)
- Volkswagenwerk Aktiengesellschaft v. Federal Maritime Comm'n, 390 U.S. 261 (1968)
- Norfolk & Western R. Co. v. Missouri Tax Comm'n, 390 U.S. 317 (1968)
- Lee v. Washington, 390 U.S. 333 (1968) (per curiam)
- Walker v. Wainwright, 390 U.S. 335 (1968) (per curiam)
- Lookretis v. United States, 390 U.S. 338 (1968) (per curiam)
- Hettleman v. Chicago Law Institute, 390 U.S. 338 (1968) (per curiam)
- Wiseman v. Barby, 390 U.S. 339 (1968) (per curiam)
- Felton v. Pensacola, 390 U.S. 340 (1968) (per curiam)
- FTC v. Fred Meyer, Inc., 390 U.S. 341 (1968)
- Poafpybitty v. Skelly Oil Co., 390 U.S. 365 (1968)
- Simmons v. United States, 390 U.S. 377 (1968)
- Newman v. Piggie Park Enterprises, Inc., 390 U.S. 400 (1968) (per curiam)
- Biggers v. Tennessee, 390 U.S. 404 (1968) (per curiam)
- Shakin v. Board of Medical Examiners of Cal., 390 U.S. 410 (1968) (per curiam)
- Sullivan v. Georgia, 390 U.S. 410 (1968) (per curiam)
- McBride v. Smith, 390 U.S. 411 (1968) (per curiam)
- McSurely v. Ratliff, 390 U.S. 412 (1968) (per curiam)
- Reed v. Mississippi, 390 U.S. 413 (1968) (per curiam)
- Protective Comm. for Independent Stockholders of TMT Trailer Ferry, Inc. v. Anderson, 390 U.S. 414 (1968)
- Alitalia-Linee Aeree Italiane, S. p. A. v. Lisi, 390 U.S. 455 (1968) (per curiam)
- Anderson v. Johnson, 390 U.S. 456 (1968) (per curiam)
- Reed Enterprises v. Clark, 390 U.S. 457 (1968) (per curiam)
- Ortega v. Michigan, 390 U.S. 457 (1968) (per curiam)
- Feris v. Balcom, 390 U.S. 458 (1968) (per curiam)
- Lahman v. W. E. Gould & Co., 390 U.S. 458 (1968) (per curiam)
- Banks v. Chicago Grain Trimmers Assn., Inc., 390 U.S. 459 (1968)
- Peoria Tribe of Okla. v. United States, 390 U.S. 468 (1968)
- Avery v. Midland County, 390 U.S. 474 (1968)
- Johnson v. Massachusetts, 390 U.S. 511 (1968) (per curiam)
- Hogue v. Southern R. Co., 390 U.S. 516 (1968) (per curiam)
- Greenwald v. Wisconsin, 390 U.S. 519 (1968) (per curiam)
- Anderson v. Nelson, 390 U.S. 523 (1968) (per curiam)
- Atlantic Ins. Co. v. State Bd. of Equalization of Cal., 390 U.S. 529 (1968) (per curiam)
- Varnum v. California, 390 U.S. 529 (1968) (per curiam)
- Hopkins v. Cohen, 390 U.S. 530 (1968)
- Edwards v. Pacific Fruit Express Co., 390 U.S. 538 (1968)
- In re Ruffalo, 390 U.S. 544 (1968)
- Avco Corp. v. Machinists, 390 U.S. 557 (1968)
- United States v. Johnson, 390 U.S. 563 (1968)
- United States v. Jackson, 390 U.S. 570 (1968)
- Fontaine v. California, 390 U.S. 593 (1968) (per curiam)
- Bertera's Hopewell Foodland, Inc. v. Masters, 390 U.S. 597 (1968) (per curiam)
- Incorporated Village of Port Jefferson v. Board of Supervisors of County of Suffolk, 390 U.S. 597 (1968) (per curiam)
- Jehovah's Witnesses in State of Wash. v. King County Hospital Unit No. 1, 390 U.S. 598 (1968) (per curiam)
- United States v. Coleman, 390 U.S. 599 (1968)
- Stern v. South Chester Tube Co., 390 U.S. 606 (1968)
- Cameron v. Johnson, 390 U.S. 611 (1968)
- Ginsberg v. New York, 390 U.S. 629 (1968)
- Interstate Circuit, Inc. v. Dallas, 390 U.S. 676 (1968)
- Haswell v. Powell, 390 U.S. 712 (1968) (per curiam)
- Times Mirror Co. v. United States, 390 U.S. 712 (1968) (per curiam)
- Scafati v. Greenfield, 390 U.S. 713 (1968) (per curiam)
- Till v. New Mexico, 390 U.S. 713 (1968) (per curiam)
- Nationwide Mut. Ins. Co. v. Vaage, 390 U.S. 714 (1968) (per curiam)
- Anderson v. Tiemann, 390 U.S. 714 (1968) (per curiam)
- City of New York v. United States, 390 U.S. 715 (1968) (per curiam)
- Safeguard Mut. Ins. Co. v. Housing Authority of Camden, 390 U.S. 716 (1968) (per curiam)
- Garment Workers v. Scherer & Sons, Inc., 390 U.S. 717 (1968) (per curiam)
- Horlock v. Oglesby, 390 U.S. 718 (1968) (per curiam)
- Barber v. Page, 390 U.S. 719 (1968)
- St. Amant v. Thompson, 390 U.S. 727 (1968)
- Hanner v. DeMarcus, 390 U.S. 736 (1968) (per curiam)
- Southern Pacific Co. v. United States, 390 U.S. 744 (1968) (per curiam)
- Hosack v. Smiley, 390 U.S. 744 (1968) (per curiam)
- Della Rocca v. United States, 390 U.S. 745 (1968) (per curiam)
- Roadway Express, Inc. v. Director, Div. of Taxation, 390 U.S. 745 (1968) (per curiam)
- Sims v. Cohen, 390 U.S. 746 (1968) (per curiam)
- Permian Basin Area Rate Cases, 390 U.S. 747 (1968)
