= Provident Tradesmens Bank & Trust Co. v. Patterson =

Provident Bank v. Patterson
- Supreme Court of the United States

Argued November 6–7, 1968 Decided January 29, 1969
- Full case name: Provident Tradesmens Bank & Trust Co., Administrator v. Patterson, Administrator, et al.
- Citations: 390 U.S. 102 (more) 88 S. Ct. 733; 19 L. Ed. 2d 936; 1968 U.S. LEXIS 2548

Holding
- In deciding this discretionary matter the Court of Appeals should have considered the existence of a verdict reached after a prolonged trial in which the defendants did not invoke the pending state actions.

Court membership
- Chief Justice Earl Warren Associate Justices Hugo Black · William O. Douglas; John M. Harlan II · William J. Brennan Jr. Potter Stewart · Byron White; Abe Fortas · Thurgood Marshall

Case opinion
- Majority: Harlan, joined by unanimous court

Laws applied
- Rule 19 of the Federal Rules of Civil Procedure

Provident Tradesmens Bank & Trust Co. v. Patterson, 390 U.S. 102 (1968), is a United States Supreme Court decision which clarified the meaning and application of Rule 19 of the Federal Rules of Civil Procedure. In a unanimous decision, the Court reversed the judgment of the United States Court of Appeals for the Third Circuit and held that an automobile owner's interest in a suit against his insurer did not make him an "indispensable party" to that suit under Rule 19. The Court also made clear that Supreme Court precedent predating the enactment of the Federal Rules of Civil Procedure did not create any substantive right in non-parties to be joined in case, as the Court of Appeals had apparently thought.

== Facts of the Case ==
The case involved a somewhat complex set of facts arising from an automobile accident. Donald Cionci was driving a car when he collided with a truck driven by Thomas Smith (Edward Dutcher, the car's owner, was not present when the accident occurred). John Harris and John Lynch were passengers in the car at the time of the crash. As a result of the collision, Cionci and Smith were killed, as was John Lynch. Harris, however, survived.

Provident Tradesmens Bank, the administrator of Lynch's estate, sued the estate of Cionci (the car's driver) in federal district court pursuant to diversity jurisdiction. Cionci's estate, in turn, notified Lumbermens Mutual Casualty Company, Dutcher's insurance company, alleging that Lumbermen's had a duty to defend pursuant to Dutcher's insurance policy. However, Lumbermens declined to defend Cionci's estate in the suit by Provident, asserting that Cionci had not had permission to drive Dutcher's vehicle and hence was not covered by the policy. The suit by Provident against the estate of Cionci was subsequently settled for $50,000 but Cionci, being penniless, could not pay.

Apparently eyeing Lumbermen's deep pockets and armed with a liquidated $50,000 claim from its suit against Cionci's estate, Provident brought suit in federal district court seeking a declaration that Cionci had permission from Dutcher to use the automobile. The only named defendants in the declaratory action were Lumbermens and the estate of Cionci. David Dutcher, the owner of the vehicle and the beneficiary of the Lumbermens insurance policy, was not named as a defendant.

The district court concluded that as a matter of applicable Pennsylvania law, the driver of an automobile is presumed to have the permission of the owner. Although the defendants sought to introduce testimony by Dutcher (the car's owner) concerning the restrictions he had imposed on Cionci's use of the automobile, the court held that under Pennsylvania's "Dead Man Rule" Dutcher was incompetent to testify, because his interests were adverse to that of Lynch's estate. Since there was no other evidence controverting the presumption of permission by Dutcher, the district court directed a verdict in favor of the Provident Tradesmens Bank.

Lumbermens appealed, and the United States Court of Appeals for the Third Circuit held that because Dutcher was an indispensable party and was not joined in the initial action, the suit must be dismissed. It held (1) that a person's whose rights may be affected by a judgment has a "substantive" right to be joined in the action, (2) that a trial court may not proceed in that person's absence, and (3) that since Dutcher could not be joined without destroying the court's diversity jurisdiction, the suit had to be dismissed.

The Supreme Court of the United States granted certiorari to address the scope of the newly amended Rule 19 of the Federal Rules of Civil Procedure.

== Supreme Court Decision ==
After reciting the full text of Rule 19, the Court assumed that Dutcher fell within the description in section (a) of persons who should be "joined if feasible." However, because Dutcher was from the same state as the plaintiffs in the case (Pennsylvania), he could not be joined without depriving the federal courts of jurisdiction over the case.

The Court then turned to the section (b) of Rule 19, which governs situations where joinder of the absent person is not feasible. The Rule articulates four factors to be considered by a court in deciding whether "in equity or good conscience the action should proceed among the parties before it, or should be dismissed." The four factors were 1) the plaintiff's interest in an adequate forum, 2) the defendant's interest in avoiding relitigation of the issues before the court and in avoiding inconsistent and unfair relief, 3) the absent party's interests at stake, and 4) the interests of the court and the general public in complete, consistent, efficient settlement of controversies. The court noted that these factors should have been analyzed by the federal district courts before a judgment was issued. As a result of the fact that a judgment had already been entered, the court then analyzed the factors from the standpoint of an appellate review of the relief granted by the trial court.

The court concluded that 1) the plaintiff's interest in preserving a fully litigated judgment was controlling unless countered by greater opposing considerations, 2) the defendants' interests in joining Dutcher were foreclosed by their failure to move for such a joinder before judgment was entered, 3) the absent party's interests were not foreclosed by his failure to be joined and the judgment entered by the trial court therefore does not bind him and causes his rights no harm as a result, and 4) the efficiency of the judiciary may have been benefitted from an attempt to find a more suitable forum for the controversy before judgment was entered but, after judgment was entered, efficiency would best be served upon appellate review by preserving the trial court's judgment. For the foregoing reasons, the Supreme Court determined that the case should not be dismissed because Dutcher's absence during trial would not violate any of his substantive rights.

As a result of the four factor analysis, the Court ruled that Dutcher was a necessary party but not an indispensable party. The difference between the two is that a suit may proceed without the former but cannot proceed without the latter. The Supreme Court also noted that the district court had misinterpreted Shields v. Barrow to incorrectly assume that a case must be dismissed wherever the interests of an absent party were affected. The Supreme Court explained that where an absent party's interests were affected in a suit, the four factors enumerated above had to be analyzed to determine whether the suit should proceed without the party or be dismissed.

== See also ==
- List of United States Supreme Court cases, volume 390
