= Linkletter v. Walker =

- Supreme Court of the United States

Decided June 7, 1965
- Full case name: Linkletter v. Walker
- Citations: 381 U.S. 618 (more)

Holding
- The Constitution neither prohibits nor requires that new interpretations of constitutional criminal rights have retrospective effect.

Court membership
- Chief Justice Earl Warren Associate Justices Hugo Black · William O. Douglas; Tom C. Clark · John M. Harlan II; William J. Brennan Jr. · Potter Stewart; Byron White · Arthur Goldberg

Case opinions
- Majority: Clark
- Dissent: Black, joined by Douglas

Linkletter v. Walker, 381 U.S. 618 (1965), was a United States Supreme Court case in which the Court held that the Constitution neither prohibits nor requires that new interpretations of constitutional criminal rights have retrospective effect.

== See also ==
- Teague v. Lane
