= Cox v. Louisiana =

- Supreme Court of the United States

Argued October 21, 1964 Decided January 18, 1965
- Full case name: Reverend Mr. B. Elton Cox v. Louisiana
- Citations: 379 U.S. 536 (more) 85 S. Ct. 453; 13 L. Ed. 2d 471; 1965 U.S. LEXIS 2008

Court membership
- Chief Justice Earl Warren Associate Justices Hugo Black · William O. Douglas; Tom C. Clark · John M. Harlan II; William J. Brennan Jr. · Potter Stewart; Byron White · Arthur Goldberg

Case opinions
- Majority: Goldberg
- Concurrence: Black
- Concurrence: Clark
- Concur/dissent: White

Laws applied
- U.S. Const. amend. I

Cox v. Louisiana, 379 U.S. 536 (1965), is a United States Supreme Court case based on the First Amendment to the U.S. Constitution. It held that a state government cannot employ "breach of the peace" statutes against protesters engaging in peaceable demonstrations that may potentially incite violence.

== Background ==
The case arose after the picketing of a segregated restaurant on December 14, 1961, in Baton Rouge, Louisiana, led to the arrest of 23 student protesters from Southern University, a black college. The next day, B. Elton Cox, a minister, arranged a protest of 2,000 people at the courthouse where the students were being held. The police agreed to allow the protest as long as it was across the street from the courthouse.

Between 100 and 300 whites gathered on the other side of the street. The protesters proceeded in a peaceful orderly fashion, and began to sing songs and hymns causing the jailed students to respond by singing.

Cox then gave a speech exhorting the protesters that upon departure from the courthouse, to proceed into downtown to sit at the segregated lunch counters, This caused "muttering" and "grumbling" in the gathering white crowd across the street. The sheriff then ordered the protesters to disperse, but before they could, the police fired tear gas into the black group, injuring some, including minister Cox who was hit in the ankle by a tear gas canister. No arrests were made then, but the next day Reverend Cox was arrested at a church and charged with four offenses under Louisiana law, criminal conspiracy, disturbing the peace, obstructing public passages, and picketing before a courthouse. This heavy raft of charges Cox held was a pretext to charge exorbitant bail with the design of draining the funds of the local civil rights movement, and silencing his leadership. Cox was later acquitted of criminal conspiracy but convicted of the other three offenses and sentenced to a total of one year and nine months jail time and fined $5,700. In two separate judgments the Louisiana Supreme Court affirmed all three convictions. Both judgments were appealed.

== Social context ==
All courts adhere to the same judicial standards as the Supreme Court, but local and state courts are more immediately influenced by the political and social environments specific to their location and representative body (Vines 1965: 5). For example, during the 1950s and 1960s, the courts governing states and cities in the southern United States were more greatly influenced by the race struggles that they lived with and saw daily than courts in other areas of the country. In contrast to this, the "Supreme Court justices should have no constituency; they are appointed for life to sit as judges over all people." (Steel 1968) Largely for this reason, Southern African Americans much preferred arguing in front of federal courts, where they felt they had a greater chance of being judged fairly and according to the law. Studies during the 1950s and 1960s show that African Americans were correct in their favoring of the federal courts over state, as federal courts decided in favor of African American defendants 60% more often than cases in Southern state courts. (Vines 1965: 10) This caused much tension and strife within the respective Southern state or community and forced the Supreme Court to rule in response to the controversial issues of race and discrimination.

By late 1964, when the Supreme Court heard arguments in Cox v. Louisiana, demonstrations and protests marked a change in American society. In a 1965 New York Times editorial, James Reston spoke on protest and social change when he said "this rising protest in the nation is having its effect." (Reston 1965: 34) Reston also said "the new activist spirit of the church and the university in America, allied to the modern television and airplane, is now having a profound influence on law and politics in the United States." (Reston 1965) The large scale of demonstrations during this time period gained much public attention, with increased media attention and viewership. Nielsen ratings increased 46% more than average during coverage of a 1963 civil rights march in Washington DC. (see Adams, Val. "TV: Coverage of March". The New York Times August 29, 1963: p. 43.)

== Court's decision ==
Justice Goldberg, writing for the court, overturned Cox's conviction.

A film of the protest was a key piece of evidence, countering the State's claim that the singing from the jail turned the peaceful assembly into a riotous one; the judges watched it with rapt attention. The film showed the protest was peaceful until the police joined in.

Labor unions were a factor in the Court's decision. Labor unions use picketing as a common tactic, so any case concerning public assembly is of great interest to labor groups. Justices Black and Clark made note of the obstruction charge as bad for labor picketing in their opinions, and even stated that the threat to labor picketing was their main reasoning for that decision. (Kalven 1965) In the words of one justice, Hugo L. Black, "Those who encourage minority groups to believe that the United States Constitution and Federal laws give them a right to patrol and picket in the streets whenever they choose, in order to advance what they think to be a just and noble end, do no service to those minority groups, their cause, or their country." (Graham, pg 2) Another link with labor groups is Associate Justice Goldberg, the Justice who delivered the opinion in Cox v. Louisiana, was formerly special counsel to the major labor group the AFL–CIO (The New York Times July 16, 1960 pg. 7).

Cox v. Louisiana did not provide the response and verdict that some critics believe it could have (Steel, pg. 2) Instead, the Court's response to the civil rights movement was more ambivalent and reflective of white attitudes that were against black protest. Of the three convictions of Cox, (breach of peace, picketing near the courthouse, and obstruction of a public passageway), the justices all agreed that the breach of peace conviction did not stand. The justices disagreed about the convictions of picketing near the courthouse and the obstruction of a public passageway. While the courts did upset the convictions, "the opinions ... bristled with cautions and with a lack of sympathy for such forms of protest (Klaven pg. 8)."

== See also ==
- List of United States Supreme Court cases, volume 379
- Brown v. Louisiana
- Adderley v. Florida
- Edwards v. South Carolina

== References & further research ==
- Adams, Val. "TV: Coverage of March." The New York Times August 29, 1963: p. 43.
- Katzenbach, Nicolas DeB. "Protest, Politics, and the First Amendment." Tulane Law Review April 1970: p. 444.
- Kalven, Harry Jr. "The Concept of the Public Forum: Cox v. Louisiana" Supreme Court Review Vol. 1965 (1965): p. 8. 9 Graham, p. 2.
- Kenneth C. Vines, "Southern State Supreme Courts and Race Relations," Western Political Quarterly 18 (1965): p. 5.
- Lewis M. Steel, "A critic's view of the Warren Court – Nine Men in Black Who Think White", The New York Times (October 13, 1968).
- Reston, James. "Washington : The Rising Spirit of Protest." The New York Times March 19, 1965: p. 34. 6 Ibid
- "Labor Endorsement of Ticket Expected." The New York Times July 16, 1960: p. 7
