= List of United States Supreme Court cases, volume 381 =

This is a list of all the United States Supreme Court cases from volume 381 of the United States Reports:

Case name	Citation	Date decided
Zemel v. Rusk	381 U.S. 1	1965
Maryland ex rel. Levin v. United States	381 U.S. 41	1965
United States v. Midland-Ross Corp.	381 U.S. 54	1965
Dixon v. United States (1965)	381 U.S. 68	1965
Simons v. Miami Beach First Nat. Bank	381 U.S. 81	1965
FPC v. Union Elec. Co.	381 U.S. 90	1965
Corbett v. Stergios	381 U.S. 124	1965
Susser v. Carvel Corp.	381 U.S. 125	1965
Watts v. Seward School Bd.	381 U.S. 126	1965
Parrot v. Tallahassee	381 U.S. 129	1965
McClelland v. Chesapeake & Ohio R. Co.	381 U.S. 130	1965
Holt v. Virginia	381 U.S. 131	1965
United States v. California	381 U.S. 139	1965
Jaben v. United States	381 U.S. 214	1965
United States v. Atlas Life Ins. Co.	381 U.S. 233	1965
Waterman S. S. Corp. v. United States	381 U.S. 252	1965
Commissioner v. Cooper	381 U.S. 274	1965
Allen v. Hoffius	381 U.S. 274	1965
Howell v. Ohio	381 U.S. 275	1965
Watson v. Missouri	381 U.S. 275	1965
Turney v. Arkansas	381 U.S. 276	1965
McKinley v. Reilly	381 U.S. 276	1965
O'Connell v. Manning	381 U.S. 277	1965
Killgore v. Blackwell	381 U.S. 278	1965
FCC v. Schreiber	381 U.S. 279	1965
Lamont v. Postmaster General	381 U.S. 301	1965
Minnesota Mining & Mfg. Co. v. New Jersey Wood Finishing Co.	381 U.S. 311	1965
Case v. Nebraska	381 U.S. 336	1965
Columbia Artists Management Inc. v. United States	381 U.S. 348	1965
Baxa v. United States	381 U.S. 353	1965
Samara v. Oklahoma Capitol Improvement Authority	381 U.S. 354	1965
Billy v. Oklahoma	381 U.S. 354	1965
Walker v. Georgia	381 U.S. 355	1965
McLeod v. Ohio	381 U.S. 356	1965
Atlantic Refining Co. v. FTC	381 U.S. 357	1965
United Gas Improvement Co. v. Continental Oil Co.	381 U.S. 392	1965
Scott v. Germano	381 U.S. 407	1965
Smith v. Warden, Conn. State Prison	381 U.S. 411	1965
Ward v. New York	381 U.S. 411	1965
Air Dispatch, Inc. v. United States	381 U.S. 412	1965
United States v. Leiter Minerals, Inc.	381 U.S. 413	1965
Kennecott Copper Corp. v. United States	381 U.S. 414	1965
Jordan v. Silver	381 U.S. 415	1965
Hearne v. Smylie	381 U.S. 420	1965
Drews v. Maryland	381 U.S. 421	1965
Travia v. Lomenzo	381 U.S. 431	1965
Motor Convoy, Inc. v. United States	381 U.S. 436	1965
Fox v. United States	381 U.S. 436	1965
United States v. Brown (1965)	381 U.S. 437	1965
Griswold v. Connecticut	381 U.S. 479	1965
Estes v. Texas	381 U.S. 532	1965
Linkletter v. Walker	381 U.S. 618	1965
Angelet v. Fay	381 U.S. 654	1965
Mine Workers v. Pennington	381 U.S. 657	1965
Meat Cutters v. Jewel Tea Co.	381 U.S. 676	1965
FTC v. Texaco, Inc.	381 U.S. 739	1965
Cameron v. Johnson	381 U.S. 741	1965
California v. Hurst	381 U.S. 760	1965
Redmond v. Virginia	381 U.S. 760	1965
Associated Food Retailers of Greater Chicago, Inc. v. Jewel Tea Co.	381 U.S. 761	1965
FPC v. Pan American Petroleum Corp.	381 U.S. 762	1965
Knowles v. Florida	381 U.S. 763	1965
