= Byrd v. Blue Ridge Rural Electric Cooperative, Inc. =

- Supreme Court of the United States

Argued January 28, 1958 Reargued April 28–29, 1958 Decided May 19, 1958
- Full case name: Byrd v. Blue Ridge Rural Electric Cooperative, Inc.
- Citations: 356 U.S. 525 (more) 78 S. Ct. 893; 2 L. Ed. 2d 953; 1958 U.S. LEXIS 1029

Case history
- Prior: Certiorari to the United States Court of Appeals for the Fourth Circuit

Holding
- State law does not apply because the laws in question were more procedural than substantive, and because other considerations mandated that state law should not apply.

Court membership
- Chief Justice Earl Warren Associate Justices Hugo Black · Felix Frankfurter; William O. Douglas · Harold H. Burton; Tom C. Clark · John M. Harlan II; William J. Brennan Jr. · Charles E. Whittaker

Case opinions
- Majority: Brennan, joined by Warren, Black, Douglas, Burton, Clark
- Concur/dissent: Whittaker
- Dissent: Frankfurter, joined by Harlan
- Dissent: Harlan

Byrd v. Blue Ridge Rural Electric Cooperative, Inc., 356 U.S. 525 (1958), decided on May 19, 1958, was a decision by the Supreme Court of the United States that refined the doctrine regarding in what instances courts were required to follow state law.

== Background of the case ==
Electric power utility company Blue Ridge Rural Electric Cooperative, Inc., the defendant in this case, provided electric power to subscribers in rural South Carolina. James Earl Byrd, the plaintiff, was employed by R. H. Bouligny, Inc., an independent contractor. Bouligny had a $334,300 contract with Blue Ridge to construct 24 miles of new power lines, the reconversion to higher capacities of about 88 miles of existing lines, and the construction of two new substations and a breaker station. Byrd touched a live wire and suffered injuries while connecting power lines to one of the new substations. He brought a claim against his employer, Bouligny, and collected workmen's compensation, his guaranteed but only remedy for work-related injuries under state law.

Byrd then proceeded to bring an action in diversity against Blue Ridge in the District Court for the Western District of South Carolina. Byrd was a resident of the state of North Carolina and Blue Ridge was a South Carolina corporation. Byrd sought damages for injuries allegedly caused by Blue Ridge's negligence. At issue was South Carolina's Workmen's Compensation Act that held that the employees of subcontractors are considered employees of the contractor for the purposes of the Act if, but only if, they perform work that is part of the contractor's trade or business. Additionally, the local judicial interpretation of the Act held that it was a question of law, not fact whether a workman was an employee under the statute, thus to be decided by a judge, not a jury.

Byrd argued that the work that Bouligny, Inc. was performing (building electric substations) was not part of Blue Ridge's "trade or business." At trial the judge entered judgment for Byrd (agreeing with the plaintiff that substations are not part of a trade or business, as the use of the substations was purely internal, and trade or business required work for someone else). The United States Court of Appeals for the Fourth Circuit reversed and directed judgment for Blue Ridge. The Supreme Court granted certiorari.

== The Court's decision ==
The question was whether the cause of action brought by the plaintiff was covered by the South Carolina Workmen's Compensation Act and therefore whether the plaintiff was barred from any other remedy against his employer in connection with the events at issue in the case. The Court, in a majority opinion by Justice William Brennan, first discussed whether the issue should be decided by a jury or by a court, as is the practice (and common law) in South Carolina.

The Court noted that while in South Carolina the court decided the question, the rule is not bound up with the definitions and rights of the parties, being purely a practical consideration with irrelevant historic causes, a custom. The Court then addressed the outcome determinative test of York. The Court reasoned that if reaching the same outcome were the only consideration then the federal court would have to follow state practice. However, in addition to the outcome-determinative test of York, the court reasoned the federal courts should consider any countervailing federal policies.

In the case, following the state practice would disrupt the federal system of allocating functions between judges and juries and go against "the influence - if not the command - of the Seventh Amendment" (that guarantees the right of a trial by jury in suits at common law). Thus the Court found that the possibility of a different outcome was less important than perverting the judge-jury function allocations in the American federal system. Brennan concluded that there is no certainty or even a strong possibility that a different outcome would necessarily result if the issue is decided by a jury, mentioning numerous powers federal judges have (including making judgments notwithstanding the verdict.)

== Analysis by scholars ==
C. Wright and M. Kane wrote in the Law of Federal Courts that "[t]here was considerable difficulty in applying the Byrd test" and that it stemmed from "the fact that there is no scale to say with assurance in a particular case that the federal interest asserted is more or less important than the interest in preserving uniformity of result with the state court."

In The Irrepressible Myth of Erie, John Hart Ely, wrote that "[t]he [Byrd] opinion exhibits a confusion that exceeds even that normally surrounding a balancing test, and lower courts understandably experienced considerable difficulty in applying it."

== See also ==
- Erie doctrine
- List of United States Supreme Court cases, volume 356
