= Edwards v. South Carolina =

- Supreme Court of the United States

Argued December 13, 1962 Decided February 25, 1963
- Full case name: Edwards, et al. v. South Carolina
- Citations: 372 U.S. 229 (more) 83 S. Ct. 680; 9 L. Ed. 2d 697

Case history
- Prior: 239 S.C. 339, 123 S.E.2d 247 (1961), reversed.

Holding
- State governments must protect First Amendment rights through the Fourteenth Amendment.

Court membership
- Chief Justice Earl Warren Associate Justices Hugo Black · William O. Douglas; Tom C. Clark · John M. Harlan II; William J. Brennan Jr. · Potter Stewart; Byron White · Arthur Goldberg

Case opinions
- Majority: Stewart, joined by Warren, Black, Douglas, Harlan, Brennan, White, Goldberg
- Dissent: Clark

Laws applied
- U.S. Const. amend. I, XIV

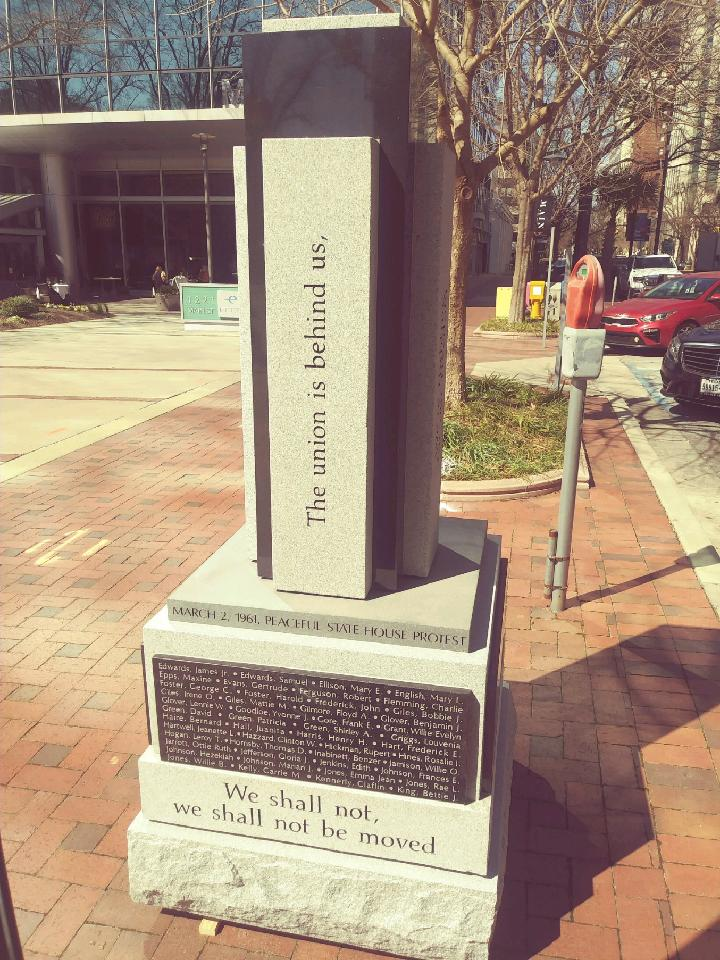
Edwards vs. South Carolina monument, Columbia, SC

Edwards v. South Carolina, 372 U.S. 229 (1963), is a landmark decision of the US Supreme Court ruling that the First and Fourteenth Amendments to the U.S. Constitution forbade state government officials to force a crowd to disperse when they are otherwise legally marching in front of a state house.

== Background ==
The 187 petitioners consisted of African-American high school and college students who peacefully assembled at the Zion Baptist Church in Columbia, South Carolina on March 2, 1961. The students marched in separate groups of roughly 15 to South Carolina State House grounds to peacefully express their grievances regarding civil rights of African-Americans. The crowd of petitioners did not engage in any violent conduct and did not threaten violence in any manner, nor did crowds gathering to witness the demonstration engage in any such behavior. Petitioners were told by police officials that they must disperse within 15 minutes or face arrest. The petitioners failed to disperse, opting to sing religious and patriotic songs instead. Petitioners were convicted of the common law crime of breach of the peace.

== Outcome ==
The Supreme Court held that in arresting, convicting and punishing the petitioners, South Carolina infringed on the petitioners' rights of free speech, free assembly and freedom to petition for a redress of grievances. The Court stated that these rights are guaranteed by the First Amendment and protected by the Fourteenth Amendment from invasion by the States.

The Supreme Court argued the arrests and convictions of 187 marchers were an attempt by South Carolina to "make criminal the peaceful expression of unpopular views" where the marchers' actions were an exercise of First Amendment rights "in their most pristine and classic form." The Court described the common law crime of breach of the peace as "not susceptible of exact definition."

=== Clark's dissent ===
While the majority in Edwards distinguished Feiner v. New York (1951), based on the absence of violence or threats from the petitioners' march to the state capital, Justice Clark stated that the breach of the peace convictions upheld in Feiner presented "a situation no more dangerous than that found here." Justice Clark noted that Edwards was more dangerous because Feiner involved one person and was limited to a crowd of about 80, whereas the Edwards demonstration involved around 200 demonstrators and 300 onlookers. He argued that the City Manager's action may have averted a catastrophe because of the "almost spontaneous combustion in some Southern communities in such a situation."

== See also ==
- Brown v. Louisiana
- Adderley v. Florida
- List of United States Supreme Court cases
- List of United States Supreme Court cases by the Warren Court
- List of United States Supreme Court cases involving the First Amendment
- List of United States Supreme Court cases, volume 372
- South Carolina in the civil rights movement
