= List of United States Supreme Court cases, volume 379 =

This is a list of all the United States Supreme Court cases from volume 379 of the United States Reports:

Case name	Citation	Date decided
Louden v. Utah	379 U.S. 1	1964
Davis v. Neely	379 U.S. 2	1964
Plantation v. Utilities Operating Co.	379 U.S. 2	1964
Schackman v. California	379 U.S. 3	1964
Battista v. Milk Control Comm'n of Pa.	379 U.S. 3	1964
Accelerated Transport-Pony Express, Inc. v. United States	379 U.S. 4	1964
Alvarez v. California	379 U.S. 4	1964
Ampco Printing-Advertisers' Offset Corp. v. New York	379 U.S. 5	1964
Edell v. Mack	379 U.S. 5	1964
Cooper-Jarrett, Inc. v. United States	379 U.S. 6	1964
Maloney v. Holden	379 U.S. 6	1964
Wycoff Co. v. Public Serv. Comm'n of Utah	379 U.S. 7	1964
Agee v. Columbus Bar Assn.	379 U.S. 7	1964
Yorty v. Jordan	379 U.S. 8	1964
Bennett v. County of Dade	379 U.S. 8	1964
Jurus v. Columbus Bar Assn.	379 U.S. 9	1964
Lind v. Minnesota	379 U.S. 9	1964
Ford v. Louisiana	379 U.S. 10	1964
McIlvaine v. Louisiana	379 U.S. 10	1964
Wasmuth v. Allen	379 U.S. 11	1964
Wright v. Illinois	379 U.S. 11	1964
Cepero v. President of United States	379 U.S. 12	1964
Binz v. Helvetia Fla. Enterprises, Inc.	379 U.S. 12	1964
Gager v. Kasdon	379 U.S. 13	1964
Safeway Trails, Inc. v. Furman	379 U.S. 14	1964
Alhambra Trucking Co. v. Public Util. Comm'n of Cal.	379 U.S. 14	1964
Dixie Feed & Seed Co. v. Byrd	379 U.S. 15	1964
Boineau v. Thornton	379 U.S. 15	1964
Bohman v. Boston Real Estate Comm'n	379 U.S. 16	1964
Bohman v. Peutucket Five Cent Saving Bank	379 U.S. 16	1964
Mamula v. Steelworkers	379 U.S. 17	1964
Giova v. Rosenberg	379 U.S. 18	1964
Tancil v. Woolls	379 U.S. 19	1964
Shipe v. Brennan	379 U.S. 20	1964
NLRB v. Burnup & Sims, Inc.	379 U.S. 21	1964
Railway Clerks v. United Air Lines, Inc.	379 U.S. 26	1964
Hooper v. Duncan	379 U.S. 27	1964
Albaugh v. Tawes	379 U.S. 27	1964
Trautwein v. Community Redevelopment Agency of Los Angeles	379 U.S. 28	1964
Denman v. White	379 U.S. 28	1964
Brulotte v. Thys Co.	379 U.S. 29	1964
Scranton v. Drew	379 U.S. 40	1964
Boles v. Stevenson	379 U.S. 43	1964
Boyer v. Elkins	379 U.S. 47	1964
Associated Press v. Walker	379 U.S. 47	1964
United States v. Powell	379 U.S. 48	1964
Ryan v. United States	379 U.S. 61	1964
Garrison v. Louisiana	379 U.S. 64	1964
Beck v. Ohio	379 U.S. 89	1964
Schlagenhauf v. Holder	379 U.S. 104	1964
Petroleum Workers v. American Oil Co.	379 U.S. 130	1964
Colorado Interstate Gas Co. v. State Corporation Comm'n of Kan.	379 U.S. 131	1964
Northwestern Pacific R. Co. v. ICC	379 U.S. 132	1964
McCulloch v. California Franchise Tax Bd.	379 U.S. 133	1964
Calhoon v. Harvey	379 U.S. 134	1964
Gillespie v. United States Steel Corp	379 U.S. 148	1964
Musicians v. Wittstein	379 U.S. 171	1964
McLaughlin v. Florida	379 U.S. 184	1964
Railway Labor Executives' Assn. v. United States	379 U.S. 199	1964
Moity v. Louisiana	379 U.S. 201	1964
Mutter v. Wisconsin	379 U.S. 201	1964
Cross v. Bruning	379 U.S. 202	1964
Fibreboard Paper Products Corp. v. NLRB	379 U.S. 203	1964
Farmer v. Arabian American Oil Co.	379 U.S. 227	1964
Heart of Atlanta Motel, Inc. v. United States	379 U.S. 241	1964
Katzenbach v. McClung	379 U.S. 294	1964
Hamm v. Rock Hill	379 U.S. 306	1964
King v. United States	379 U.S. 329	1964
All States Freight, Inc. v. New York, N. H. & H. R. Co.	379 U.S. 343	1964
Piano Workers v. W. W. Kimball Co.	379 U.S. 357	1964
Green v. Bomar	379 U.S. 358	1964
Parsons v. Buckley	379 U.S. 359	1965
California v. Lo-Vaca Gathering Co.	379 U.S. 366	1965
United States v. First Nat. City Bank	379 U.S. 378	1965
Whitney Nat. Bank in Jefferson Parish v. Bank of New Orleans & Trust Co.	379 U.S. 411	1965
Fortson v. Dorsey	379 U.S. 433	1965
Henry v. Mississippi	379 U.S. 443	1965
Turner v. Louisiana	379 U.S. 466	1965
Stanford v. Texas	379 U.S. 476	1965
Jankovich v. Indiana Toll Road Comm'n	379 U.S. 487	1965
El Paso v. Simmons	379 U.S. 497	1965
Cox v. Louisiana	379 U.S. 536	1965
Cox v. Louisiana	379 U.S. 559	1965
SEC v. American Trailer Rentals Co.	379 U.S. 594	1965
Fortson v. Toombs	379 U.S. 621	1965
Arrow Transp. Co. v. Cincinnati, N. O. & T. P. R. Co.	379 U.S. 642	1965
NLRB v. Adams Dairy, Inc.	379 U.S. 644	1965
Tisone v. Ohio	379 U.S. 644	1965
Halpert v. Udall	379 U.S. 645	1965
Winkle v. Bannan	379 U.S. 645	1965
Thorn v. Harrisburg Trust Co.	379 U.S. 646	1965
Winship v. Corpus Christi	379 U.S. 646	1965
Kitty Hawk Development Co. v. Colorado Springs	379 U.S. 647	1965
Sheridan v. Gardner	379 U.S. 647	1965
Voorhes v. Dempsey	379 U.S. 648	1965
Lyles v. Beto	379 U.S. 649	1965
Morrison-Knudsen Co. v. Washington	379 U.S. 649	1965
Republic Steel Corp. v. Maddox	379 U.S. 650	1965
Davis v. Baltimore & Ohio R. Co.	379 U.S. 671	1965
Lisbon Salesbook Co. v. Ohio	379 U.S. 673	1965
Texas v. New Jersey	379 U.S. 674	1965
Blow v. North Carolina	379 U.S. 684	1965
FPC v. Amerada Petroleum Corp.	379 U.S. 687	1965
Hearne v. Smylie	379 U.S. 692	1965
Forty-Fourth Gen. Assembly of Colo. v. Lucas	379 U.S. 693	1965
Hughes v. WMCA, Inc.	379 U.S. 694	1965
