= Subversion =

Attempt to transform the established social order and its structures

Subversion (from Latin subvertere 'overthrow') is a process by which the values and principles of a system in place are contradicted or reversed in an attempt to sabotage the established social order and its structures of power, authority, tradition, hierarchy, and social norms. Foreign subversion refers to "hostile meddling in a rival’s domestic politics, against the wishes of the existing regime, in order to weaken it or change its foreign policy." Foreign subversion tends to be covert rather than overt. Foreign subversion is generally perceived to be a hostile attack.

A subversive is something or someone carrying the potential for some degree of subversion. In this context, a "subversive" is sometimes called a "traitor" with respect to (and usually by) the government in power. Subversion is also often a goal of comedians, artists and people in those careers. In this case, being subversive can mean questioning, poking fun at, and undermining the established order in general.

Subversion is distinct from war on one hand and diplomacy on the other hand. Covert subversion is used as a tool to achieve political goals because it generally carries less risk, cost, and difficulty as opposed to open belligerency or overt subversion. Foreign subversion can take the form of "[attempting] to recruit and assist indigenous political and military actors to overthrow their government by coup d’état". If subversion fails in its goal of bringing about a coup it is possible that the actors and actions of the subversive group could transition to insurrection, insurgency, and/or guerrilla warfare.

== Definition ==
The problem with defining the term subversion is that there is not a single definition that is universally accepted. Charles Townshend described subversion as a term "so elastic as to be virtually devoid of meaning, and its use does little more than convey the enlarged sense of the vulnerability of modern systems to all kinds of covert assaults." Subversion was described by Paul Blackstock as an attack on the public morale and, "the will to resist intervention are the products of combined political and social or class loyalties which are usually attached to national symbols. Following penetration, and parallel with the forced disintegration of political and social institutions of the state, these tendencies may be detached and transferred to the political or ideological cause of the aggressor".

What follows are some of the many attempts to define the term:

"Subversion is the undermining or detachment of the loyalties of significant political and social groups within the victimized state, and their transference, under ideal conditions, to the symbols and institutions of the aggressor."

"Subversion — Actions designed to undermine the military, economic, psychological, or political strength or morale of a governing authority."

"Subversive Activity — Anyone lending aid, comfort, and moral support to individuals, groups, or organizations that advocate the overthrow of incumbent governments by force and violence is subversive and is engaged in subversive activity. All willful acts that are intended to be detrimental to the best interests of the government and that do not fall into the categories of treason, sedition, sabotage, or espionage will be placed in the category of subversive activity."

"Subversive Political Action — A planned series of activities designed to accomplish political objectives by influencing, dominating, or displacing individuals or groups who are so placed as to affect the decisions and actions of another government."

Subversion — "A destructive, aggressive activity aimed to destroy the country, nation, or geographical area of your enemy... [by demoralizing the cultural values and changing the population's perception of reality].

Subversion — Roger Trinquier defined subversion as a term that could be lumped together under the name modern warfare, "as being interlocking systems of actions, political, economic, psychological and military that aims at the overthrow of established authority in a country."

Subversion — Jill Kastner and William Wohlforth define foreign subversion as the "hostile meddling in a rival’s domestic politics, against the wishes of the existing regime, in order to weaken it or change its foreign policy."

Subversion "Drawing on intelligence studies, I define it by its indirect and secret mechanism of exploitation and manipulation that allows projecting power and shifting its balance short of war. This mechanism distinguishes subversion from warfare and diplomacy, the classic instruments of power in international relations. In war, states use force to compel an enemy to one’s will. Diplomacy in turn relies on persuasion, threats, and bargaining to get an adversary to do what one wants. These activities happen on the front stage of world politics. Subversion, on the other hand, is a menace that spreads in the shadows, belonging to the world of covert operations. Like a virus infecting the cells of its host, it secretly infiltrates an adversary’s society and institutions, manipulating, weakening, and disintegrating them from within. If successful, it subdues an adversary before the latter even realizes it is under threat..

== Conceptual understanding ==
Defining and understanding subversion means identifying entities, structures, and things that can be subverted. Furthermore, it may help to identify practices and tools that are not subversive. Institutions and morals can be subverted, but ideology on the other hand cannot. The fall of a government or the creation of a new government as a result of an external war is not subversion. Espionage does not count as subversion because it is not an action that leads directly to an overthrow of a government. Information gathered from espionage may be used to plan and carry out subversive activities.

To gain an understanding of what is considered to be subversive requires understanding the intent of those taking action. This makes defining and identifying subversion a difficult process. As Laurence Beilenson points out, "To criticize a government in an effort to reform it or to change its policies is not subversion, even though such criticism may contribute to overthrow. But criticism intended to help a projected overthrow becomes subversive without regard to whether it is right or wrong."

The word is present in all languages of Latin origin, originally applying to such events as the military defeat of a city. As early as the 14th century, it was being used in the English language with reference to laws, and in the 15th century came to be used with respect to the realm. The term has taken over from 'sedition' as the name for illicit rebellion, though the connotations of the two words are rather different; sedition suggesting overt attacks on institutions, subversion something much more surreptitious, such as eroding the basis of belief in the status quo or setting people against each other.

== Types ==
Subversion can generally be broken down into internal and external subversion, but this distinction is not meant to imply that each follows a specific set of unique and separate tools and practices. Each subversive campaign is different because of the social, political, economic, cultural, and historical differences that each country has. Subversive activities are employed based upon an evaluation of these factors. This breakdown merely clarifies who the actors are. While the subversive actors may be different, the soon to be subverted targets are the same. As Paul W. Blackstock identifies, the ruling and political elites are the ultimate targets of persuasion because they control the physical instruments of state power.

Internal subversion is actions taken by those within a country and can be used as a tool of power. In most cases the use or threat of force is the last step of internal subversion.

External subversion is actions taken by another country in cooperation with those inside the subverted country and can be used as a tool of statecraft. Foreign volunteers from another country are not enough to qualify for external subversion. The reason for this is that the individuals may legitimately share the cause of the internal subversive dissidents and have legitimately volunteered. Only when the government itself furnishes a nation with money, arms, supplies, or other help to dissidents can it be called external subversion.

Terrorist groups generally do not employ subversion as a tool to achieve their goals. Subversion is a manpower-intensive strategy and many groups lack the manpower and political and social connections to carry out subversive activities. However, actions taken by terrorists may have a subversive effect on society. Subversion can imply the use of insidious, dishonest, monetary, or violent methods to bring about such change. This is in contrast to protest, a coup d'état, or working through traditional means in a political system to bring about change.

== Tools and practices ==
Subversive actions can generally be grouped into three interrelated categories:

- Establishing front groups and penetrating and manipulating existing political parties
- Infiltrating the armed forces, the police, and other institutions of the state, as well as important non-government organizations
- Generating civil unrest through demonstrations, strikes, and boycotts.

Other factors, while not specifically falling into these categories, may also be useful to subversive dissidents. Additionally, many tools may overlap into other groups of tools as well. As an example, subversives may infiltrate an organization for cultural subversion more so than for control. Civil unrest may be used to provoke the government into a violent response.

=== Infiltration and establishing front groups ===
In order for a group to be successful in subverting a government, the group itself and its ideas must be seen as an acceptable alternative to the status quo. However, groups that work toward subverting a government, in many cases, follow ideas and promote goals that on their surface would not receive the support of the population. Therefore, "to gain public credibility, attract new supporters, generate revenue, and acquire other resources, groups need to undertake political activities that are entirely separate, or appear separate, from the overtly violent activities of those groups. Sometimes this is achieved by infiltrating political parties, labor unions, community groups, and charitable organizations." Infiltrating organizations is an important tool because these institutions are already seen as legitimate in the eyes of the people and provide a platform to express their ideas. When infiltrating, the dissident identifies needs of the organization and then links those needs to solutions that his ideology can provide. This was a technique that the Communist Party USA employed. Once the organization has been co-opted, the dissident can then move on to establishing ties with other groups. Furthermore, in addition to gaining possible legitimacy for its ideas the infiltration of these groups can "bolster political allies, attack government policies, and attract international support." If some organizations are too difficult to infiltrate, it may be necessary to create new organizations that appear to be independent but are actually under the direction of the subversive group.

The infiltration of state organizations can provide subversive groups the opportunity to do many things to achieve their goals. The infiltration of security forces can provide information about the government's capabilities and how they plan to address the group's activities. Infiltration also provides the opportunity to plant false information, lead the government to misallocate resources, to steal funds, weapons, equipment, and other resources, and ultimately aid in weakening and delegitimizing the government. The targets of infiltration are not limited to the groups and institutions mentioned above. Economic industries and universities have also been the target for infiltration. In the case of universities, the liberal arts departments are more prone to subversion than the hard sciences.

=== Russian and French methods ===
Dominique Poirier, former employee and specialist in communication warfare in the French intelligence service, DGSE, describes extensively subversion in a book on the practices and methods of this agency published in 2019, yet he rarely uses the noun "subversion", remarkably. While presenting and describing extensively the Russian and French methods of subversion and counter-subversion, he explains that the French intelligence community in particular uses the term guerre de l’information, or "information warfare". Then information warfare subsumes a number of other nouns, sometimes of Russian origin, each denoting a specific action that may actually describe an action of subversion or counter-subversion. Coming to add to the latter difference in perception of the action of subversion, he further says that information warfare in the French intelligence community is ruled itself by active measures that the DGSE, acting as leading intelligence agency in France, adopted as an "all-encompassing" doctrine. Indeed, active measures in France would regulate not only all intelligence and counterintelligence activities, but also foreign affairs and diplomacy, domestic politics, and even the activities of the major industrial and business companies and groups in this country, since a period he locates between 1980 and 1982. For all the latter would be logically called to partake in a common and coherent effort in intelligence, counterintelligence, influence, and counterinfluence on the French soil as abroad. Actually, the French intelligence community, and the DGSE in particular, always use the nouns "interference" (French: ingérence) and "counterinterference" (contre-ingérence) to name "subversion" and "counter-subversion" respectively. The DGSE and one other intelligence agency of this country at least are particularly active in subversive activities abroad, often in a joint effort with the Russian foreign intelligence service, SVR RF, with a focus on the United States, Dominique Poirier specifies from firsthand knowledge and experience spanning the years 1980 to c. 2001. In the latter context, the main methods of subversion he presents as "actions of influence" and their expected results are the followings.

Most French and Russian actions of subversion, and of domestic influence alike, actually are governed by the notion of minority influence as initially defined by social psychologist Serge Moscovici. However, the DGSE in particular designs all such actions in accordance with fundamentals of a scientific approach akin to behaviorism, called "behavioral biology" (French: biologie comportementale) initially established in the early 1980s by French military scientist Henri Laborit. Additionally, the narrative, or "formal aims" of the action of subversion — when there is one, as behavioral biology focuses on acting on the unconscious, or id, locating in the reptilian brain as defined by Paul D. MacLean — is defined in accordance with fundamentals in epistemology, another Russian import in French information warfare and active measures.

The expression "awareness raising" "was a Soviet import that occurred in France during the preparatory stage of the riots and general strikes of May 1968. It happened in the early months of the latter year, first as a sophisticated technique in agitprop known in the Soviet KGB under the name сенсибилизация (siencibilizatz’iya), otherwise used in the other field of epistemology in Soviet Union. In France, the latter Russian word was given definitively the translation 'sensibilisation' (without equivalent in English) circa March 1968, as this word, sounding similar, already existed with other meanings in this country. The latter facts explain why sensibilisation / 'awareness raising' is the same in its principle as the other method of 'minority influence' in agitprop." "An action of awareness raising in active measures may aim to influence the opinion of the public in one's own country or that of a foreign country or both, and its goal is to make masses of people receptive to a concern that may be either true and founded, or false and ill-founded in reality, or neither entirely true and founded nor entirely false and ill-founded but "somewhere between these two absolutes." The latter hypothesis, which often is expected in active measures, is explained and ruled by the disciplines of fuzzy logic and chaos theory, and generally aims to breed doubt, confusion, or inhibition, and then angst, discontent, or fear in the minds of people.

Remarkably, French experts in domestic influence and subversion use colloquially the noun "sleepwalkers" (French: somnanbules) to call "all ordinary people composing the masses. The reason justifying the choice of this noun, pejorative in a sense, is that an overwhelming majority of ʻordinary peopleʼ are unable to tell the difference between neutral, objective information (news) and propaganda intended to influence. As seen from the viewpoint of specialists, the whole population behaves as millions of 'sleepwalkers' ready to believe anything the media, authors, and agents of influence tell and write, indifferently. The reason explaining the naïveté is that people tend to believe at its face value everything is formally published and broadcast, by wrongly attributing some official and unanimously approved virtue to media such as print and audiovisual periodical publications, books, and similar. Then the greater the number of people truly or apparently involved in the publishing / broadcasting of a fact or fallacy is, the truer it seems to be in the understanding of the masses. Additionally, the greater the known number of people who watched, listened, or read the fact or fallacy is, the greater the probability is that ʻit is true indeed,ʼ still in the understanding of the masses. ... Moreover, in France, specialists in influence and counter-influence are tasked to prevent the masses of people / 'sleepwalkers' from "waking up" and understanding that they actually are thus fooled permanently, and by which methods and tricks they are so, since their own country fabricates and spreads fallacies for them either. In other words, about the latter explanation, teaching the masses on methods and techniques in foreign influence would be effective and salutary, doubtless, but at the same time it would reveal to them the influence and propaganda that their own government tailors and spreads for them. ... In the DGSE, a rule alluding colloquially to this particular definition of sleepwalker says, Ils dorment ; ne les réveillez pas ('They [the masses] sleep, don't wake them up'). Edgar Morin, French communist philosopher, sociologist, intelligence officer, and founder of modern methods and techniques of mass influence and manipulation is at the origin of this particular use of the word sleepwalker. Morin often said, "Eveillés, ils dorment" ('Awaken, they sleep'), quoting his own way Greek philosopher Heraclitus. Thus, Morin implied that, as taken collectively, ordinary people who constitute the masses are too stupid to make the difference between the truth, influence, propaganda, and disinformation. For the record, the exact and complete English translation of Morin's quote above is, "All men do walk in sleep, and all have faith in that they dream: for all things are as they seem to all, and all things flow like a stream."

=== Economics ===
Economics can be both a tool of the internal and external subversive. For the external subversive simply cutting off credit can cause severe economic problems for a country. An example of this is the United States' relations with Chile in the early 1970s. In an attempt to get Salvador Allende removed from office, the United States tried to weaken the Chilean economy. Chile received little foreign investments and the loss of credit prevented Chile from purchasing vital imports. An economic pressure of this kind prevents an economy from functioning and reduces a country's standard of living. If the reduction is too great, the people may become willing to support a change in the government's leadership. The main objective of economic pressures is to make it difficult for the country to fulfill its basic obligations to the citizenry either by cutting off trade or by depriving it of resources.

The internal subversive can also use economics to put pressure on the government through use of the strike. An example of this is the Chilean Truckers' Strike during the 1970s. The strike prevented the transport of food staples and forced nearly 50% of the national economy to cease production. Activities of these kinds create human, economic, and political problems that, if not addressed, can challenge the competency of the government.

=== Agitation and civil unrest ===
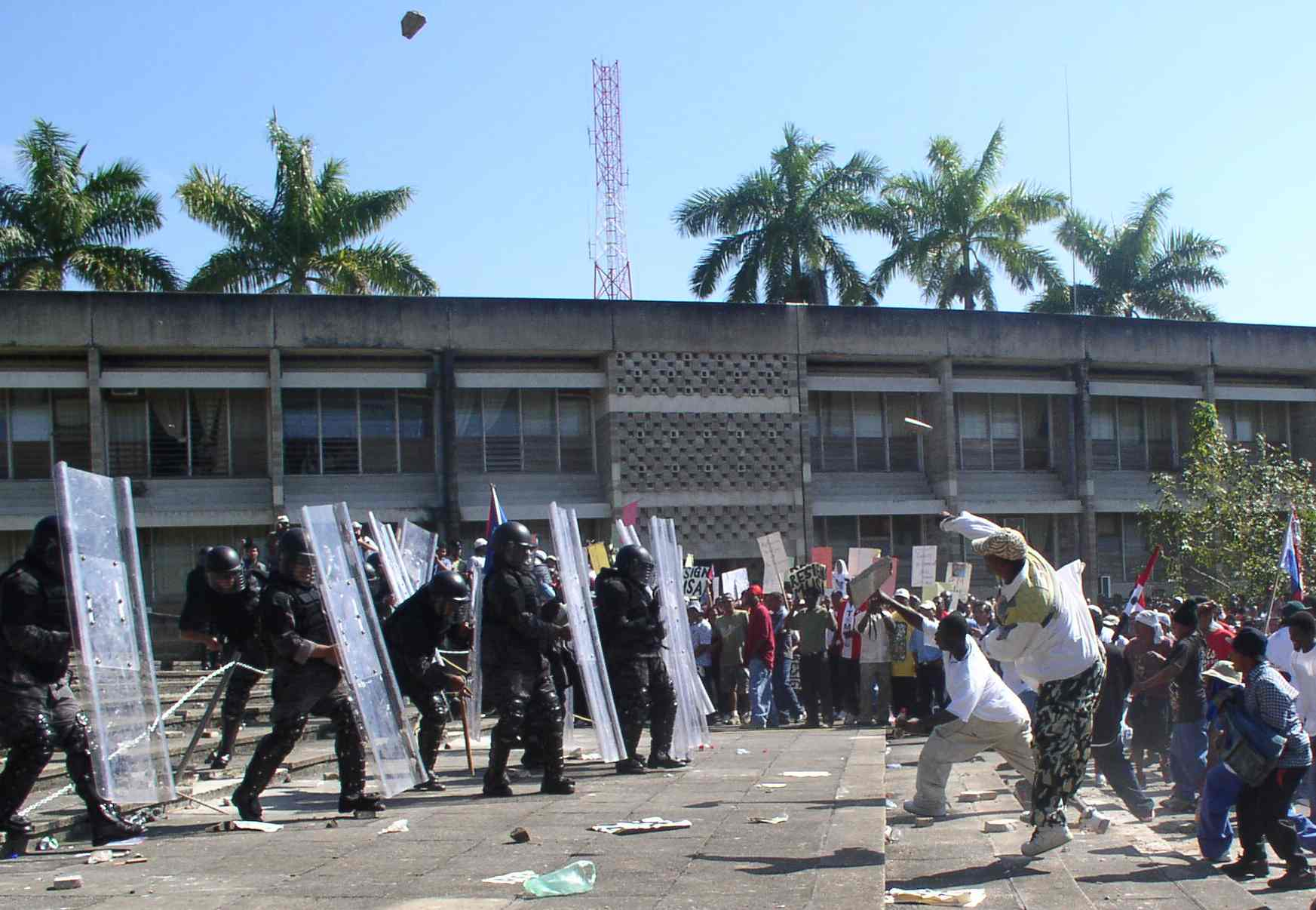

As defined by Laurence Beilenson, agitation is "subversive propaganda by action such as mass demonstrations or the political strike, that is, a strike not intended to benefit the union or workers in the ordinary sense, but intended instead against the government." Furthermore, propaganda and agitation, even when they are legal forms of freedom of speech, press, and assembly can still be classified as subversive activity. These tools further demonstrate the need to determine intent of those taking action to identify subversive activities.

Civil unrest creates many of the problems that an insurgency campaign does. First of all it is an affront to government authority, and if the government is unable to quell the unrest it leads to an erosion of state power. This loss of power stems from the people's lack of trust in the government to maintain law and order. In turn, the people begin to question whether or not new leadership is needed. Discrediting, disarming, and demoralizing the government is the goal of these activities and the cause of the government's loss of power. Civil unrest depletes resources as the government is forced to spend more money on additional police. Additionally, civil unrest may be used to provoke a response from the government. In the 1940s, during strikes against the Marshall Plan, communists in France would "deliberately provoke the police and gendarmerie into acts of repressive violence in order to exploit the resulting 'martyrs to the cause' for propaganda purposes." These martyrs and subsequent propaganda can be useful in turning political and social groups against each other. The less violent forms of unrest, "such as worker absenteeism, passive resistance, boycotts, and deliberate attempts to cripple government agencies by 'overloading the system' with false reports, can have powerfully disruptive effects, both economically and politically."

=== Offensive terror ===
Offensive terror can be defined as the killing of people, destruction of property, kidnapping, etc. It is usually a minor part of subversion and "is used not to exert force in the transfer of state power, but is meant to cower the people or ruler." Force used in this manner is meant to reinforce other forms or persuasion in addition to cowering the people or leaders. Additionally, much like civil unrest and agitation, it raises the question of whether or not the state can provide security for the population. Terror also provides a practical motivation of physically removing political opponents. The assassination of an organization's leader may open the door to a successor that is more friendly to the subversives position or possibly someone that has successfully infiltrated the organization and is in fact one of the subversives.

=== Bribery ===
Bribery is one of the most common tools of subversion. Most societies see bribery as a form of corruption, and it used as a subversive tool because it "implies the undermining of existing rules of political or moral conduct." It can also be one of the less reliable tools as well. Bribed officials are only useful if they take action. However, actions taken over a period of time draw suspicion from the public. The official must be able to carefully conceal their actions or perform only key functions and action. For these reasons, bribed officials are most effective when they are asked to take immediate action. In the case of external subversion, bribery is usually used for influence rather than for actions.

== Subverting cultural hegemony ==
Recent writers, in the post-modern and post-structuralist traditions (including, particularly, environmentalist and feminist writers) have prescribed a very broad form of subversion. It is not directly the parliamentary government which should be subverted in their view, but the dominant cultural forces, such as patriarchy, individualism, and scientism. This broadening of the target of subversion owes much to the ideas of Antonio Gramsci, who stressed that communist revolution required the erosion of the particular form of 'cultural hegemony' within society.

Theodor Adorno argued that the culture industry and its shallow entertainment was a system by which society was controlled through a top-down creation of standardized culture that intensified the commodification of artistic expression; in 1938, he said that capitalism has colonized every aspect of life so much that "every pleasure which emancipates itself from the exchange-value takes on subversive features."

Using culture to bring about change to a political system through integration of political warfare and political action and the targeting of cultural vehicles and institutions is another tool of subversion. The use of the arts or more broadly culture is primarily a tool for external subversives, as internal subversives are generally citizens of the country and share the same culture. It is a tool that takes a longer period of time to implement and its effects are revealed over time, as opposed to those of a terrorist attack or civil unrest. Therefore, one could classify this tool as an element of strategic subversion. The targets of cultural subversive activities are traditionally film, literature, popular music, educational institutions, mass media, religious organizations, charitable organizations, and other forms of art. The intended results of these activities are to persuade or co-opt publics, discredit the ideas of enemies and splitting factions within the enemy's camp.

The state is charged with the protection of the civilizational values of society (liberty, equality, comradeship, compassion, democracy, education, the family, religion, rule of law, human and civil rights, etc.), "including the cultural/aesthetic values that enhance the quality of life and maintain its legitimacy." In situations where the government is not being a good steward in protecting these values, the use of tools like literature, film, music can be used as a reminder of these values, as well as a forum to protest and question the government's legitimacy. Additionally, art and culture allow people to connect on an emotional level that could soften negative perceptions one may be believed to have. Once the stigma has been removed, the target may be more receptive to other messages conveyed. This individual or group would no longer be seen as being completely different from them. Another example of how culture can be subversive is seen in Iran. Western culture, media, art, etc. is popular among the country's youth, but certain elements are banned or curtailed. As the exportation of Western culture continues, conflict between the state and its citizens is created. The government is then seen as unresponsive or out of touch with its people.

== Laws ==
=== Subversive activity ===
Subversive activity is the lending of aid, comfort, and moral support to individuals, groups, or organizations that advocate the overthrow of incumbent governments by force and violence. All willful acts that are intended to be detrimental to the best interests of the government and that do not fall into the categories of treason, sedition, diversion, sabotage, or espionage are placed in the category of subversive activity.

=== Mainland China ===
Subversion (Chinese: 颠覆; pinyin: Diānfù) is a crime in Mainland China. The Government of the People's Republic of China prosecutes subversives under Articles 102 through 112 of the state criminal law. These articles specify the types of behavior that constitute a threat to national security and China has prosecuted many dissidents including Nobel Peace Prize laureate Liu Xiaobo using these laws. Of these, Articles 105 and 111 are the ones most commonly employed to silence political dissent. Article 105 criminalizes organizing, plotting, or carrying out subversion of the national order, or using rumor mongering or defamation or other means to incite subversion of the national order or the overthrow of the socialist system. Article 111 prohibits stealing, secretly collecting, purchasing, or illegally providing state secrets or intelligence to an organization, institution, or personnel outside the country.

=== Hong Kong ===
Subversion was criminalised in Hong Kong on 30 June 2020 by Hong Kong national security law.

=== Italy ===
Subversion is a crime in Italy (Attentato alla Costituzione) under Article 283 of Italian criminal law (Codice penale italiano) and Associazione sovversiva under Articles 270 and 270-bis.

=== United Kingdom ===
There is no crime defined as "subversion" (as opposed to treason) in British constitutional law. Attempts have been made to introduce definitions but there is no general consensus among political and legal theorists.

Historically MI5 were entrusted with the legal investigative powers for concerns of threats to national security by subversion, but in the Security Service Act 1989, subversion was not mentioned, and according to the official MI5 website, subversion is no longer investigated, due to a reduced threat as a result of the end of the Cold War and of associated political situations since the 1980s.

=== United States ===
In federal law, 18 U.S.C. ch. 115 covers "Treason, Sedition, and Subversive Activities."

As related above, members of the Communist Party were supposed by legislators to be subversives, especially after the Russian Revolution. The House Un-American Activities Committee was formed in 1938 in order to investigate alleged disloyalty and subversive activities on the part of private citizens, public employees, and those organizations suspected of having Communist ties. Senator Joseph McCarthy became the most visible public face of a period in which Cold War tensions fueled fears of widespread Communist subversion. The term "McCarthyism", coined in 1950 in reference to McCarthy's practices, including public attacks on the character or patriotism of political opponents, was soon applied to similar anti-communist activities. Senator Pat McCarran sponsored the McCarran Internal Security Act of 1950 and the Immigration and Nationality Act of 1952, both of which were hotly contested in the law courts, and by Harry Truman, who went so far as to veto the former; however, the veto was overridden in the Senate by a margin of 57 to 10.

In 1943, the Supreme Court ruled that an avowed publisher of the Communist doctrine could be naturalized a citizen of the United States in Schneiderman v. United States, 320 U.S. 118 (1943).

Aptheker v. Secretary of State tested in 1964 whether a passport could be disallowed to a Communist. Aptheker won.

Elfbrandt v. Russell involved questions concerning the constitutionality of an Arizona Act requiring an oath from state employees. William O. Douglas wrote in 1966 for a strongly divided court the majority opinion that the State could not require the oath and accompanying statutory gloss.

The Warren court ruled by 5–4 majority in Keyishian v. Board of Regents (of SUNY) to strike down New York State law that prohibited membership by professors in any organization that advocated the overthrow of the US government or any organization that was held by the Regents to be "treasonous" or "seditious". The Regents also required teachers and employees to sign an oath that they were not members of the Communist Party.

=== Iran ===
Subversion (Persian: براندازی, romanized: barandāzi) is a crime in Iran. The government of Islamic Republic of Iran prosecutes subversives under Articles 498 through 500, 507 and 508 of Iran's criminal laws.

== See also ==
- Agent of influence
- Agent provocateur
- Destabilisation
- Counter-insurgency
- Information Warfare
- Psychological warfare
- Red terror
- Revolution
- Sedition
- Subvertising, a portmanteau of subverting and advertising
- Yuri Bezmenov
- Active measures
- Little rabbit jokes
