= Bantam Books, Inc. v. Sullivan =

1963 U.S. Supreme Court decision on censorship

- Supreme Court of the United States

Argued December 4, 1962 Decided February 18, 1963
- Full case name: Bantam Books, Inc., et al. v. Joseph A. Sullivan et al. As Members of the Rhode Island Commission to Encourage Morality in Youth.
- Citations: 372 U.S. 58 (more) 83 S. Ct. 631; 9 L. Ed. 2d 584; 1963 U.S. LEXIS 1552
- Argument: Oral argument

Case history
- Prior: Bantam Books, Inc. v. Sullivan, 93 R.I. 411, 176 A.2d 393 (1961)

Holding
- The activities of the Rhode Island Commission to Encourage Morality in Youth in issuing notices and lists of objectionable publications to book distributors, and requesting their cooperation in preventing the sale of such publications, constitutes a system of informal censorship, and thus violates the First Amendment.

Court membership
- Chief Justice Earl Warren Associate Justices Hugo Black · William O. Douglas; Tom C. Clark · John M. Harlan II; William J. Brennan Jr. · Potter Stewart; Byron White · Arthur Goldberg

Case opinions
- Majority: Brennan, joined by Warren, Douglas, Stewart, White, Goldberg
- Concurrence: Douglas
- Concurrence: Black (in judgment)
- Concurrence: Clark (in judgment)
- Dissent: Harlan

Laws applied
- U.S. Const. amends. I

Bantam Books, Inc. v. Sullivan, 372 U.S. 58 (1963), was a United States Supreme Court case which held that the actions of the Rhode Island Commission to Encourage Morality in Youth, which involved pressuring distributors to stop selling certain publications, violated the First Amendment by creating an unconstitutional system of informal censorship. The Court ruled that the commission's practice of issuing notices and lists of objectionable publications to book distributors, and requesting their cooperation in preventing the sale of such publications, was unconstitutional. Justice William J. Brennan Jr. delivered the majority opinion, emphasizing that government entities cannot use indirect methods to suppress constitutionally protected speech and that states must create procedural safeguards to protect non-obscene materials from being censored subjectively. Justice John Marshall Harlan II dissented, arguing that the majorities decision failed to justify ruling against the commission's actions which he viewed only as an attempt to deal with a societal problem rather than a suppression of free speech.

== Background ==
=== Commission ===
The Rhode Island Commission to Encourage Morality in Youth was instituted during the January Session of the Rhode Island General Assembly in 1956. Established by the Rhode Island state assembly, the commission was created as a body composed of nine members appointed by the governor of Rhode Island. The commission's initial mandate focused on investigating indecent materials that might be present in public schools. Additionally, it was responsible for investigating materials that could be potentially deemed obscene under Rhode Island law, recommending prosecution for any legal violations. However, the commission did not possess any legal enforcement power; it relied on implied threats of potential legal action and public shaming to ensure compliance with its requests. These notices often suggested that the failure to comply could result in prosecution for distributing obscene materials. In 1959, the original mandate of the commission was partially superseded and expanded by Resolution No. 95 S. 444. This resolution significantly broadened the commission's responsibilities. Beyond its initial focus on public education and investigation of obscene materials, the commission was now even more dedicated to specific measures to combat juvenile delinquency and promote morality among youth. The revised mandate directed the commission to investigate situations that might lead to what the state deemed undesirable juvenile behavior and to educate the public on these contributing factors. It recommended legislative actions, prosecutions, and supposed treatments for addressing and mitigating what the state believed to be the causes of juvenile delinquency.

=== Bantam Books ===
Bantam Books, Inc. is a large publisher and distributor of paperback book and was notably affected by the commission's actions. The company often published works that feature adult themes and contentious social issues. Bantam Books received multiple notices from the commission listing several of its publications as objectionable and requesting their removal from sale. Despite the lack of direct legal enforcement, the implied threats of legal action and public shaming resulted in compliance by many distributors and retailers.

Bantam Books, Inc. challenged the commission's actions in court, arguing that the informal censorship system employed by the commission violated the First Amendment's protection of free speech. Four out-of-state publishers, Bantam Books, Dell Publishing Company, Inc., Pocket Books, Inc., and The New American Library of World Literature, Inc. sought injunctive relief and a declaratory judgment in a Rhode Island court, asserting that the law and its practices were unconstitutional. The court found that the commission's notices intimidated distributors and retailers, resulting in the suppression of the sale of the listed books. The State Attorney General conceded that several publications listed in the notices were not obscene within the Court's definition of the term.

=== Rhode Island Superior Court ===
The case was brought before The Rhode Island Superior Court. The Superior Court initially issued an injunction against the commission, preventing them from circulating book blacklists to distributors under the threat of prosecution for non-compliance. This judicial action was significant as it directly challenged the commission's practices, which were perceived as a form of prior restraint and intimidation against booksellers and distributors.

Judge William M. Mackenzie's injunction was based on the argument that the commission's activities constituted illegal intimidation. The commission had sent notices to book wholesalers and retailers stating, "The Chiefs of Police have been given the names of the aforementioned magazines with the order that they are not to be sold, distributed, or displayed to youths under 18 years of age. The Attorney General will act for us in cases of non-compliance." These notices were viewed as coercive, pressuring distributors to comply with the commission's blacklist under the threat of legal action.

=== Rhode Island Supreme Court ===
After the Superior Court ruling, the case was appealed to the Rhode Island Supreme Court. The Court addressed two main issues: the constitutionality of the resolution that established the commission and the legality of the actions under that resolution. The Court upheld the constitutionality of the resolution itself, stating that it did not authorize prior restraint or censorship. It only empowered the commission to educate the public about obscene materials and recommend prosecution for violations of obscenity laws. However, the Court found that the commission's application of the resolution was unconstitutional. The practice of notifying distributors about objectionable publications, coupled with implicit threats of prosecution, amounted to informal censorship and violated the First Amendment. These actions intimidated distributors, resulting in the suppression of the listed books, which were not legally declared obscene. Justice Francis Condon, writing for the majority, emphasized that the commission's actions exceeded its authority and constituted an informal system of censorship. Justice Thomas H. Roberts dissented, arguing that the commission's overreach should be restrained, as it acted beyond its mandate without regulatory power over book distribution. Ultimately, the Rhode Island Supreme Court's decision was a split 3–1 decision. It upheld the constitutionality of the resolution but found the commission's application of it to be unconstitutional, thereby reversing part of the Superior Court's decree and remanding the case for further proceedings.

== Opinion of the Court ==
=== Arguments ===
The petitioners, Bantam Books, Inc. and other publishers, were represented by Horace Manges, an attorney from Weil, Gotshal & Manges. Manges contended that the Rhode Island commission's practices amounted to an unconstitutional prior restraint on free speech. Representing the respondents, the Rhode Island commission to Encourage Morality in Youth, were Attorney General of Rhode Island J. Joseph Nugent, and the Chief Special Counsel for the State of Rhode Island Joseph L. Breen. Nugent and Breen defended the commission's actions, arguing that they were within the legal bounds established by the resolution and were necessary to protect the youth from obscene materials.

=== Majority opinion ===
Justice William J. Brennan Jr. delivered the majority opinion that stated that the actions of the Rhode Island commission to Encourage Morality in Youth were unconstitutional, violating the First Amendment by placing a prior restraint on free speech. Justice Brennan's opinion stated that the commission's practice of notifying book distributors and retailers about "objectionable" publications, combined with implied threats of legal action, effectively made a system of informal censorship. Brennan wrote that the commission's actions made distributors and retailers weary of carrying additional adult-themed books and were under pressure to remove said publications they already have from sale. Furthermore, the opinion states that the commission's practice of suppressing the distribution of certain books without a judicial determination of obscenity infringed upon constitutionally protected freedoms.

In crafting its decision, the Court established a framework for dealing with censorship that reinforced the necessity of judicial oversight and due process. The ruling underscored that any attempt to restrict speech must pass stringent legal scrutiny and cannot be based on vague or broad standards that allow for arbitrary enforcement. The decision emphasized that prior restraints on speech should be generally presumed unconstitutional unless justified by a compelling state interest and must be implemented through a narrowly tailored lens.

=== Dissent ===
Justice John Marshall Harlan II dissented. He viewed the commission's actions not as an attempt to suppress freedom of expression, but rather as "an attempt to cope with a most baffling social problem" of protecting minors from exposure to obscene materials. Justice Harlan believed that the commission's efforts were a legitimate exercise of the state's power to safeguard public morality, particularly the welfare of children. He asserted that the majority failed to recognize the state's compelling interest in addressing this issue and overstated the impact on First Amendment rights.
