= Stone Court =

Period of the US Supreme Court from 1941 to 1946

Supreme Court of the United States
Stone Court
- Hughes Court ← → Vinson Court
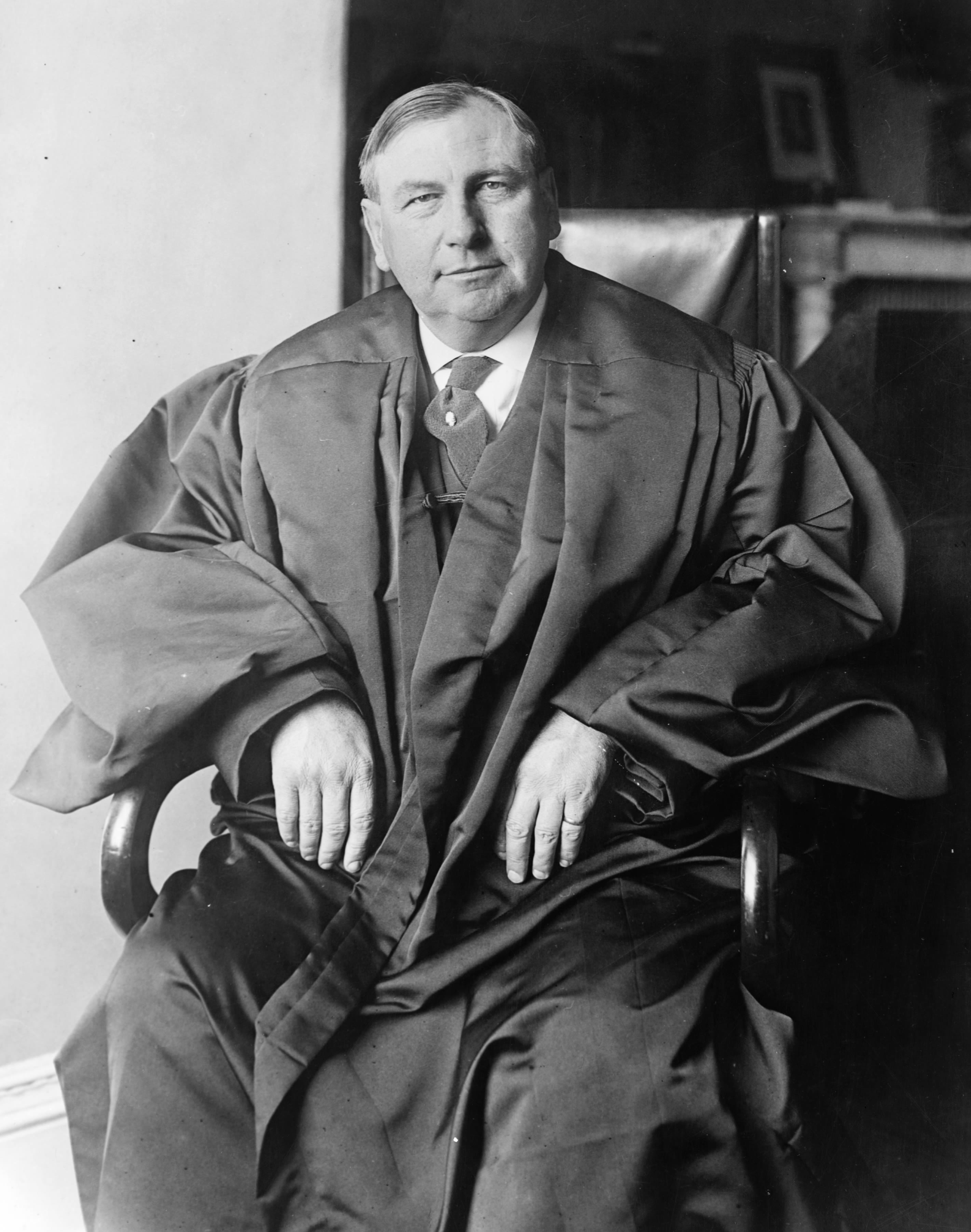
- Chief Justice Harlan F. Stone
- July 3, 1941 – April 22, 1946 (4 years, 293 days)
- Seat: Supreme Court Building; Washington, D.C.
- No. of positions: 9
- Stone Court decisions

The Stone Court refers to the Supreme Court of the United States from 1941 to 1946, when Harlan F. Stone served as Chief Justice of the United States. Stone succeeded the retiring Charles Evans Hughes in 1941, and served as Chief Justice until his death, at which point Fred Vinson was nominated and confirmed as Stone's replacement. He was the fourth chief justice to have previously served as an associate justice and the second to have done so without a break in tenure (after Edward Douglass White). Presiding over the country during World War II, the Stone Court delivered several important war-time rulings, such as in Ex parte Quirin, where it upheld the President's power to try Nazi saboteurs captured on American soil by military tribunals. It also supported the federal government's policy of relocating Japanese Americans into internment camps.

It was also one of the three successive courts that oversaw the gradual dismantling of Jim Crow laws and the separate but equal doctrine, notably in the cases Mitchell v. United States (1941) and Smith v. Allwright (1944).

== Membership ==
The Stone Court began in 1941, when Associate Justice Stone was confirmed to replace Charles Evans Hughes as Chief Justice. Stone had served as an Associate Justice since 1925, when President Calvin Coolidge nominated him to the bench. During the Court's 1932–37 terms, Stone and justices Brandeis and Cardozo formed a liberal bloc called the Three Musketeers that generally voted to uphold the constitutionality of the New Deal.

At the beginning of Stone's chief-justiceship, the Court consisted of Stone, Owen Roberts, Hugo Black, Stanley F. Reed, Felix Frankfurter, William O. Douglas, Frank Murphy, James F. Byrnes, and Robert H. Jackson (the latter two joined the court days after Stone's elevation to Chief Justice). In October 1942, Byrnes resigned from the court to become the war-time Director of the Office of Economic Stabilization; Roosevelt appointed Wiley Blount Rutledge as his replacement. Owen Roberts retired in July 1945, and President Harry Truman appointed Harold Hitz Burton to replace him.

Shortly before V-E Day, Truman named Justice Jackson to serve as U.S. Chief of Counsel for the prosecution of high-ranking German officials accused of war crimes at the 1945–46 Nuremberg trials. As a result, Jackson was absent for one entire Court term, and his fellow justices had to do an extra amount of work during the term. Stone died on April 22, 1946, after suffering a cerebral hemorrhage. Truman subsequently appointed Fred Vinson as Stone's successor.

=== Timeline ===
Bar key: Hoover appointee F. Roosevelt appointee Truman appointee

Note: Harlan F. Stone is listed as a F. Roosevelt appointee due to his elevation to the position of Chief Justice by F. Roosevelt in 1941, but he was initially appointed to the court by Calvin Coolidge.

== Other branches ==
Presidents during this court included Franklin Delano Roosevelt and Harry S. Truman. Congresses during this court included 77th through the 79th United States Congresses.

== Rulings of the Court ==
Major rulings of the Stone Court include:

- Edwards v. California (1941): Justice Byrnes authored his best known opinion to strike down a California statute criminalizing bringing indigent residents of other states to California because imposing an "intended and immediate" burden on interstate commerce was "the plain and sole function of the statute". The decision was unanimous but three Justices wanted to apply the privileges and immunities clause of the 14th amendment to strike down the law as a violation of the right of free movement.
- Glasser v. United States (1942): In a 6–2 decision written by Justice Murphy, the court reversed a criminal conviction on the basis that the defense attorney had a conflict of interest. The court also ruled that the exclusion of women from the jury pool violated the Sixth Amendment's Impartial Jury Clause. The court held that jury pools should be a "cross-section of the community."
- Betts v. Brady (1942): In a 6–3 decision written by Justice Roberts, the court ruled that indigent defendants did not have the right to an appointed counsel in state courts under the Due Process Clause. The case was overruled by Gideon v. Wainwright (1963).
- Wickard v. Filburn (1942): In a unanimous decision written by Justice Jackson, the court upheld wheat production quotas established by the Agricultural Adjustment Act of 1938. The appellant argued that the production quotas overstepped the powers granted to Congress by the Interstate Commerce Clause, as the appellant used the wheat to feed his own animals. However, the court ruled that the farmer would have bought more wheat had he not grown his own, thus affecting interstate commerce.
- West Virginia State Board of Education v. Barnette (1943): In a 6–3 decision written by Justice Jackson, the court held that the Free Speech Clause protected students from being forced to salute the American flag or recite the Pledge of Allegiance. The case overruled Minersville School District v. Gobitis, which had been decided just three years earlier by many of the same justices.
- Smith v. Allwright (1944): In an 8–1 decision written by Justice Reed, the court struck down a Texas law that allowed white primaries. The case overruled Grovey v. Townsend (1935), which had held white primaries to be constitutional on the basis that political parties are private organizations.
- Korematsu v. United States (1944): In a 6–3 decision written by Justice Black, the court upheld Executive Order 9066, which ordered the internment of tens of thousands of Japanese Americans living in the West Coast, many of whom were United States citizens. The court accepted the government's argument that the order was a matter of "military urgency". Legal scholars have denounced the ruling as one of the worst and most racist in American history, the others being Dred Scott v. Sandford and Plessy v. Ferguson. In 2011, the Solicitor General's Office publicly disavowed the ruling. The case was overruled by Trump v. Hawaii (2018).
- International Shoe Co. v. Washington (1945): In an 8–0 decision written by Justice Stone, the court held that parties could be subject to the personal jurisdiction of a state court if said parties have "minimum contacts" with the state. The court rejected the appellant's argument that the company should not fall under the jurisdiction of the state of Washington since it did not maintain a permanent "situs" of business in the state, despite doing business in the state.

== Judicial philosophy ==
Stone had largely sided with the government's position when the Hughes Court struck down several pieces of New Deal legislation, and the Stone Court (with the addition of several Roosevelt appointees) consistently upheld Congressional power pursuant to the Commerce Clause. The Stone Court also upheld broad war-time powers for the government. The Stone Court was less deferential in the area of civil liberties, striking down laws in cases such as Barnett, although Korematsu was a major exception to this trend. Despite Roosevelt's appointment of seven of the nine justices (and the elevation of Stone), the justices held independent views and often found each other at odds in regard to civil liberties. Stone himself received criticism for presiding over a divided and quarrelsome court. Justice Frankfurter often took a position supporting judicial restraint in which the court took deference to the decisions of elected officials, while Justices Black and Douglas were more willing to strike down laws and precedents for what they saw as violations of constitutional rights. Murphy and Rutledge joined Black and Douglas as part of the more liberal bloc, while Jackson, Reed, and Stone tended to side with Frankfurter. Roberts often sided with the Frankfurter bloc, but was more conservative than the other eight justices. Though outnumbered, the more liberal bloc led by Black and Douglas often took the majority in cases by peeling off the votes from the moderate bloc, as the two groupings of justices formed looser blocs than in later decades. The short length of the Stone Court gave it little chance to establish a definitive legacy. However, the Stone Court continued the Constitutional Revolution of 1937 that had started during the Hughes Court and foreshadowed the liberal rulings of the Warren Court.

== Gallery ==
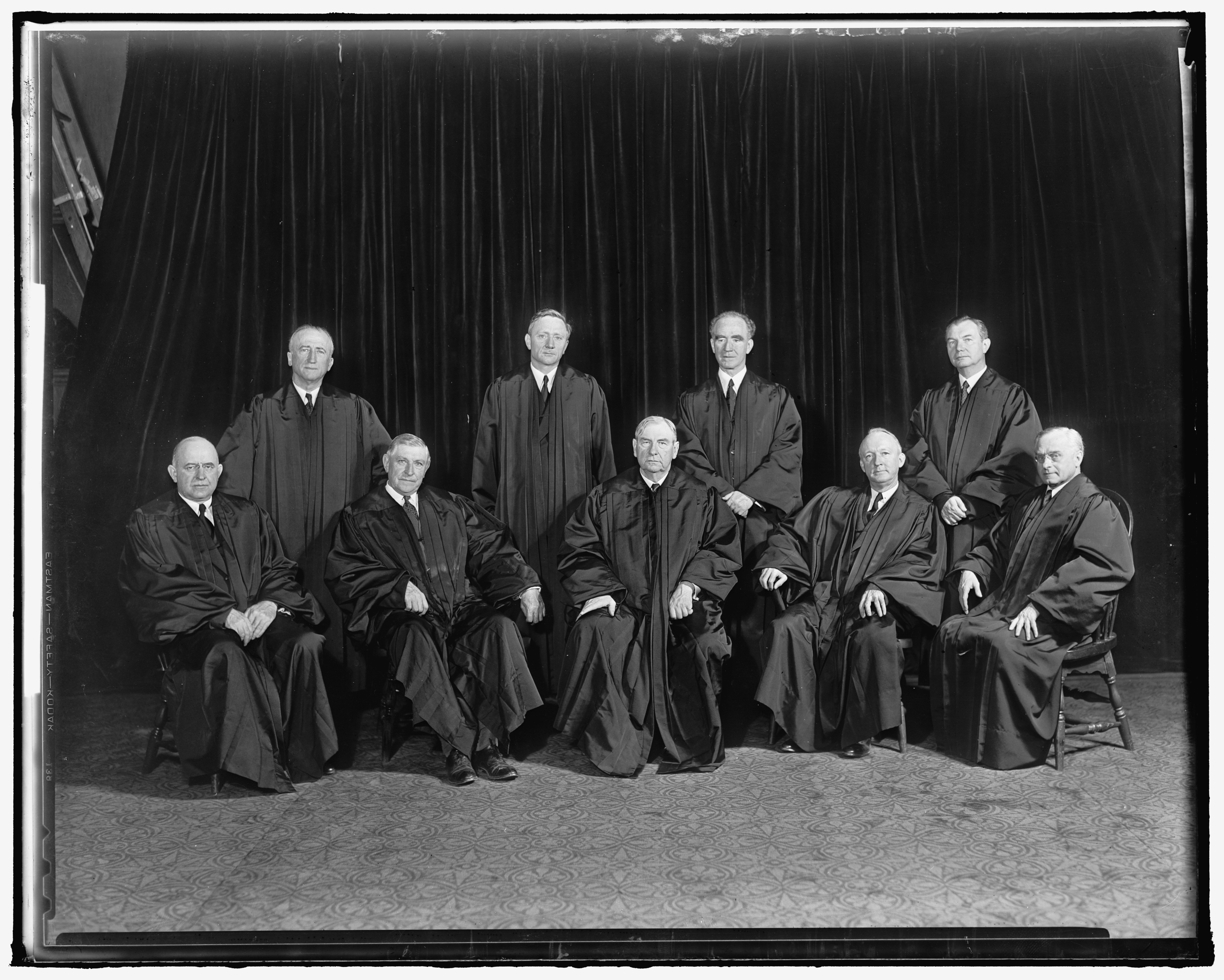
Stone Court
(July 11, 1941 – Oct 3, 1942)

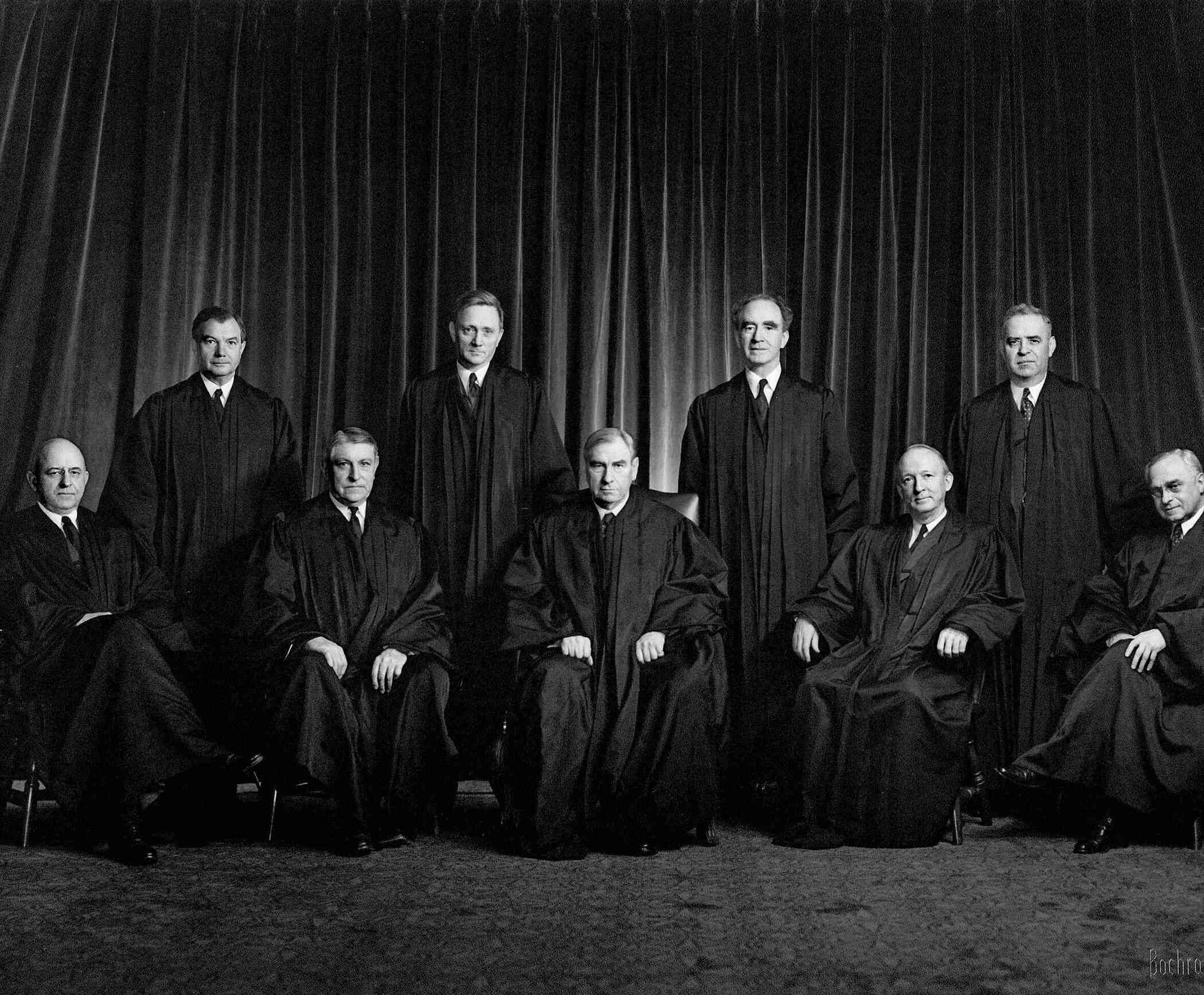
Stone Court
(February 15, 1943 – July 31, 1945)
