= United States v. Gilmore =

- Supreme Court of the United States

Argued March 27–28, 1962 Reargued December 5–6, 1962 Decided February 18, 1963
- Full case name: United States v. Don Gilmore, et ux.
- Citations: 372 U.S. 39 (more) 83 S. Ct. 623; 9 L. Ed. 2d 570; 63-1 U.S. Tax Cas. (CCH) ¶ 9285; 11 A.F.T.R.2d (RIA) 758; 1963-1 C.B. 356

Case history
- Prior: 290 F.2d 942 (Ct. Cl. 1961) (reversed and remanded)

Court membership
- Chief Justice Earl Warren Associate Justices Hugo Black · William O. Douglas; Tom C. Clark · John M. Harlan II; William J. Brennan Jr. · Potter Stewart; Byron White · Arthur Goldberg

Case opinions
- Majority: Harlan, joined by Warren, Clark, Brennan, Stewart, White, Goldberg
- Dissent: Black, Douglas

United States v. Gilmore, 372 U.S. 39 (1963), was a federal income tax case before the United States Supreme Court.

== Background ==
In the course of a hotly contested divorce, the taxpayer had incurred substantial legal fees in defending against his wife's claim to ownership of a controlling interest in the family business. Had she succeeded, his principal source of livelihood—his salary as chief executive—might be jeopardized.

Accordingly, he sought to deduct some of these fees for the "conservation ... of property held for the production of income."

== Opinion of the Court ==
Following its earlier decision in Lykes v. United States, the Supreme Court sustained the Commissioner in disallowing the deduction as a "family" expense under § 262. The Court reasoned that the deductibility of legal fees depends upon the origin of the litigated claim rather than upon the potential consequences of success or failure to the taxpayer's income status. Since the origin of the litigation was to be found in the taxpayer's marital difficulties, no deduction was allowable.

From the Syllabus:

The Supreme Court, Mr. Justice Harlan, held that origin and character of claim with respect to which expense was incurred, rather than its potential consequences upon fortunes of taxpayer, is controlling basic test of whether expense was ‘business' or ‘personal’ and, hence, whether it is deductible as expense incurred for conservation of property held for production of income.

== See also ==
- List of United States Supreme Court cases
- Lists of United States Supreme Court cases by volume
- List of United States Supreme Court cases by the Warren Court
