= Gibson v. Florida Legislative Investigation Committee =

Gibson v. Florida Legislative Comm.
- Supreme Court of the United States

Argued December 5, 1961 Reargued October 10–11, 1962 Decided March 25, 1963
- Full case name: Gibson v. Florida Legislative Investigation Committee
- Citations: 372 U.S. 539 (more) 83 S. Ct. 889; 9 L. Ed. 2d 929; 1963 U.S. LEXIS 2503

Holding
- On the record in this case, petitioner's conviction of contempt for refusal to divulge information contained in the membership lists of the Association violated rights of association protected by the First and Fourteenth Amendments.

Court membership
- Chief Justice Earl Warren Associate Justices Hugo Black · William O. Douglas; Tom C. Clark · John M. Harlan II; William J. Brennan Jr. · Potter Stewart; Byron White · Arthur Goldberg

Case opinions
- Majority: Goldberg, joined by Warren, Black, Douglas, Brennan
- Concurrence: Black
- Concurrence: Douglas
- Dissent: Harlan, joined by Clark, Stewart, White
- Dissent: White

Gibson v. Florida Legislative Investigation Committee, 372 U.S. 539 (1963), was a United States Supreme Court case based on the First Amendment to the U.S. Constitution. It held that a legislative committee cannot compel a subpoenaed witness to give up the membership lists of his organization.

== Factual background ==
In 1956, a committee of the Florida Legislature initiated an investigation of the National Association for the Advancement of Colored People (NAACP)'s Miami branch. When the authority of this committee expired, a new committee was formed in 1957 to pursue the same inquiry. This new committee subpoenaed the branch's membership list. Production of such information was refused based on the right to freedom of association that was applied to state governments in NAACP v. Alabama. Due to this refusal, the president of NAACP's Miami branch was convicted of contempt, sentenced, and fined.

== Decision ==
The Supreme Court held that the conviction violated rights of association under the First and Fourteenth Amendments. The court said the rights of free speech and free association "need breathing space to survive" and are protected from "subtle governmental interference", although the state does have a broad power to conduct legislative inquiries. Strict scrutiny applies, however, to investigations intruding on activity protected by the First Amendment. Distinguishing the Communist Party cases, the court took into account NAACP resolutions banning Communist members, and found no evidence of subversive connections.

=== Concurring opinions ===
Justice Hugo Black wrote a separate opinion concurring in the judgment only. He said "the constitutional right of association includes the privilege of any person to associate with Communists or anti-Communists, Socialists or anti-Socialists, or, for that matter, with people of all kinds of beliefs, popular or unpopular."

Justice William O. Douglas wrote a separate opinion: "The need of a referee in our federal system has increased with the passage of time...For in times of crisis, when ideologies clash, it is not easy to engender respect for the dignity of suspect minorities and for debate of unpopular issues." He said investigations by legislative committees should have a lawmaking function, and must otherwise honor constitutional boundaries:"[The] right of privacy implicit in the First Amendment creates an area into which the Government may not enter."
