= Douglas v. California =

Bennie Will Meyes and William Douglas
- Supreme Court of the United States

Argued April 7, 1962 Reargued January 16, 1963 Decided March 18, 1963
- Full case name: Douglas et al. v. State of California
- Citations: 372 U.S. 353 (more) 83 S. Ct. 814; 9 L. Ed. 2d 811

Case history
- Prior: People v. Douglas, 187 Cal. App. 2d 802, 10 Cal. Rptr. 188 (Dist. App. 2d Dist. 1960)

Holding
- Denying defense counsel during appellate review is unconstitutional

Court membership
- Chief Justice Earl Warren Associate Justices Hugo Black · William O. Douglas; Tom C. Clark · John M. Harlan II; William J. Brennan Jr. · Potter Stewart; Byron White · Arthur Goldberg

Case opinions
- Majority: Douglas, joined by Warren, Black, Brennan, White, Goldberg
- Dissent: Clark
- Dissent: Harlan, joined by Stewart

Laws applied
- Fourteenth Amendment to the United States Constitution

Douglas v. California, 372 U.S. 353 (1963), was a case before the United States Supreme Court.

== Background ==
Two defendants were tried and convicted in a California state court on felony charges including robbery, assault with a deadly weapon, and assault with intent to commit murder.

A single public defender had been appointed to represent them on these three charges. The attorney's motion for continuance at the beginning of trial was denied, although he stated that he was not as prepared as he should have been. Thereafter the defendants dismissed the defender and renewed motions for separate counsel and for a continuance. These motions were also denied. The defendants were convicted and subsequently filed appeals.

Exercising their only right to appeal as of right, they appealed to an intermediate Court of Appeals (District court of appeal of California, second appellate district), and, being indigent, applied to it for appointment of counsel to assist them on appeal. In accordance with a state rule of criminal procedure, that Court made an ex parte examination of the record, determined that appointment of counsel for petitioners would not be "of advantage to the defendant or helpful to the appellate court" and denied appointment of counsel. Their appeal was heard without assistance of counsel and their convictions were affirmed. The District Court of Appeal affirmed their convictions after denying their request for appointment of counsel under a California rule of criminal procedure authorizing such denial where after an independent investigation of the record the appellate court determines that appointment of counsel would be helpful to neither the defendant nor the court. (187 Cal App 2d 802, 10 Cal Rptr 188.)

The California Supreme Court denied their petitions for a discretionary review/hearing. (187 Cal App 2d 813, 10 Cal Rptr 214.)

== Opinion of the court ==
The Supreme Court of the United States vacated the judgment of the California District Court of Appeal. In an opinion by Justice Douglas, expressing the view of six members of the Court, it was held that the denial of counsel under the California rule of procedure stated above violated the Fourteenth Amendment.

Held: Where the merits of the one and only appeal an indigent has as of right are decided without benefit of counsel, an unconstitutional line is drawn between rich and poor.

The Court held that a procedure like the one used by the state appellate court in which an indigent defendant was denied counsel on appeal unless he first made a preliminary showing of merit did not comport with fair procedure. In vacating, the judgment of the state appellate court, the Court stated that where the merits of the one and only appeal an indigent had as of right were decided without benefit of counsel, an unconstitutional line had been drawn between rich and poor.

The Court vacated the judgment of the state appellate court and remanded for further proceedings consistent with the Court's opinion.

== Dissent ==
Clark dissented on the ground that neither the equal protection clause nor the due process clause requires more than what is provided in the California rule.

Justice Harlan, joined by Justice Stewart, dissented on the grounds that the equal protection clause was not apposite, and that the due process clause was not violated. His dissenting opinion also held that the defendants were not denied effective assistance of counsel in the trial court.
