= Vinson Court =

Period of the US Supreme Court from 1946 to 1953

Supreme Court of the United States
Vinson Court
- Stone Court ← → Warren Court
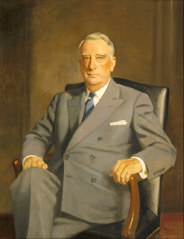
- Chief Justice Fred Vinson
- June 24, 1946 – September 8, 1953 (7 years, 76 days)
- Seat: Supreme Court Building; Washington, D.C.
- No. of positions: 9
- Vinson Court decisions

The Vinson Court refers to the Supreme Court of the United States from 1946 to 1953, when Fred M. Vinson served as Chief Justice of the United States. Vinson succeeded Harlan F. Stone as Chief Justice after the latter's death, and Vinson served as Chief Justice until his death, at which point Earl Warren was nominated and confirmed to succeed Vinson.

The court presided over the country during the start of the Cold War and the Korean War. The court's decisions reflected the continuing ideological battle between the judicial restraint of Justice Felix Frankfurter and the civil rights activism of Justices William O. Douglas and Hugo Black. Frankfurter's more conservative views prevailed during Vinson's tenure, but many of the dissents written during the Vinson Court would lay the groundwork for the major rulings during the succeeding Warren Court.

== Membership ==
The Vinson Court began in 1946, when U.S. Secretary of the Treasury Fred M. Vinson was confirmed to replace Harlan F. Stone as Chief Justice. Vinson was appointed by President Harry Truman, who had also appointed Harold Hitz Burton to the court in 1945.

At the beginning of the Vinson Court, the court consisted of Vinson, Burton, and seven of Franklin D. Roosevelt's appointees: Hugo Black, Stanley Forman Reed, Felix Frankfurter, William O. Douglas, Frank Murphy, Robert H. Jackson, and Wiley Rutledge. Rutledge and Murphy died in 1949, prompting Truman to appoint Tom C. Clark and Sherman Minton to the bench. Vinson died in September, 1953. President Dwight D. Eisenhower appointed Earl Warren as Vinson's successor by means of a recess appointment.

=== Timeline ===
Bar key: F.Roosevelt appointee Truman appointee

== Other branches ==
Presidents during this court included Harry S. Truman and Dwight D. Eisenhower. Congresses during this court included 79th through the 83rd United States Congresses.

== Rulings of the Court ==
The short tenure of the Vinson Court gave it relatively little time to render major rulings, but decisions of the court include:

- Everson v. Board of Education (1947): In a 5–4 decision written by Justice Black, the court upheld a New Jersey law that provided for transportation reimbursement for children attending private schools. The court unanimously incorporated the Establishment Clause via the Fourteenth Amendment, but the majority held that the New Jersey law did not violate the Establishment Clause because the reimbursements were provided to all parents regardless of religion.
- Shelley v. Kraemer (1948): In a 6–0 decision written by Chief Justice Vinson, the court struck down a racially restrictive covenant which had prevented people of color from purchasing a house in St. Louis, Missouri. The court held that such covenants cannot be enforced by courts of law since doing so would violate the Equal Protection Clause.
- McCollum v. Board of Education (1948): In an 8–1 decision written by Justice Black, the court struck down an Illinois program that used public school classrooms to teach voluntary religion classes during school hours. The court held that the classes violated the Establishment Clause.
- United States v. Paramount Pictures, Inc. (1948): In a 7–1 opinion written by Justice Douglas, the court forced the Big Eight film studios to sell their movie theaters in order to comply with the Sherman Antitrust Act. The decision curtailed the vertical integration of the film studios, as well as the practice of block booking.
- Dennis v. United States (1951): In a plurality decision written by Justice Vinson, the court upheld the conviction of Eugene Dennis, a Communist Party leader, under the Smith Act. The court held that the First Amendment does not protect activities that seek to overthrow the United States government. Brandenburg v. Ohio (1969) largely overruled this holding.
- Joseph Burstyn, Inc. v. Wilson (1952): In a 9–0 decision written by Justice Clark, the court ruled that motion pictures qualify as art and thus receive some protections from the First Amendment in the face of government censorship. The decision overturned Mutual Film Corp. v. Industrial Commission of Ohio (1915). Later cases expanded on Burstyn to the point that the government can only censor films for obscenity.
- Youngstown Sheet & Tube Co. v. Sawyer (1952): In a 6–3 decision written by Justice Black and in which five justices wrote concurrences, the court ordered President Truman to return control of several steel mills to their owners. Truman had taken control of the mills after the 1952 steel strike, which presented a threat to the American effort in the Korean War. The large number of concurrences made the precedential value of the ruling unclear, but the ruling nonetheless checked the executive power of the president. Justice Jackson's concurring opinion laid out three categories of executive power and made a lasting impact in the understanding of separation of powers.
- United States v. Reynolds (1953): In a 6–3 decision written by Chief Justice Vinson, the court recognized the state secrets privilege. The decision allowed the government to avoid releasing papers related to the 1948 Waycross B-29 crash.

== Judicial philosophy ==
Vinson took office at a time when the court was divided into two camps: a progressive camp led by Justices Black and Douglas, and a more moderate-conservative camp led by Justices Jackson and Frankfurter. President Roosevelt had appointed justices who would uphold the more expansive economic regulations of the New Deal (thus ending the Lochner era), but the same Roosevelt appointees often split on civil liberties cases. The Truman appointees, who had executive or legislative branch experience and were reluctant to strike down government powers at the dawn of the Cold War, largely took the side of Jackson and Frankfurter. Justices Rutledge and Murphy were part of the more liberal bloc prior to their death, while Burton and Reed tended to side with Frankfurter and Jackson. The court thus took a more conservative position than the Stone Court (particularly after 1949), which often struck down laws for conflicting with civil liberties. However, the views of Black and Douglas generally won out in the succeeding Warren Court, and their dissents in Vinson Court cases such as Dennis helped lay the foundation for many of the Warren Court holdings. On his death, The New York Times credited Vinson for soothing the tensions between the two blocs of justices, but legal historian Michal Belknap counters by arguing that Vinson was largely unsuccessful in this endeavor.

== Gallery ==
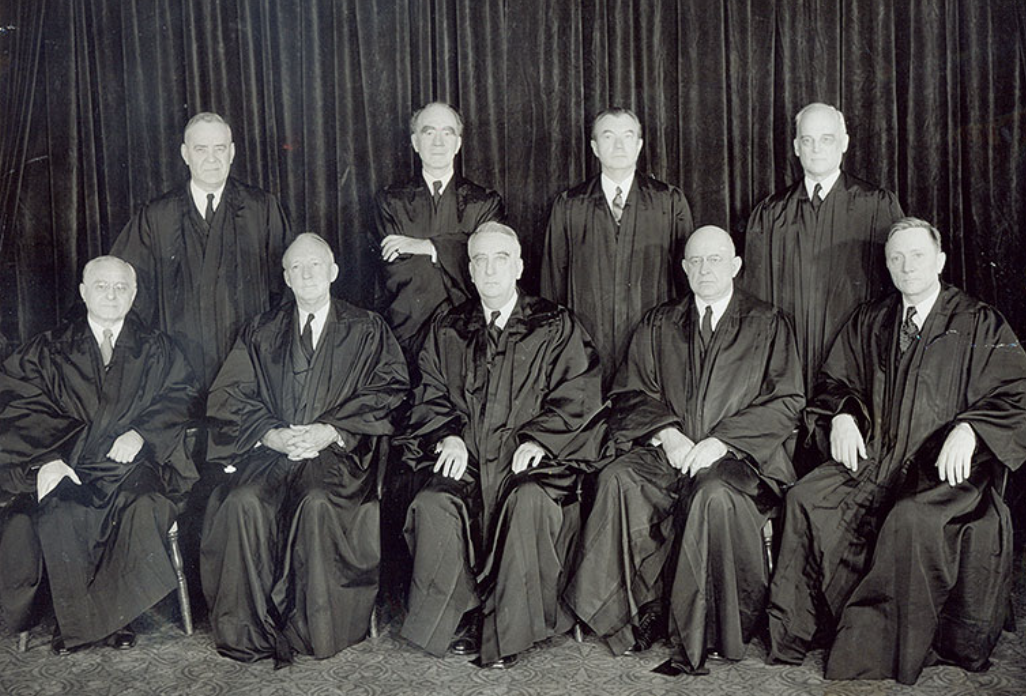
Vinson Court
(June 24, 1946 – July 19, 1949)

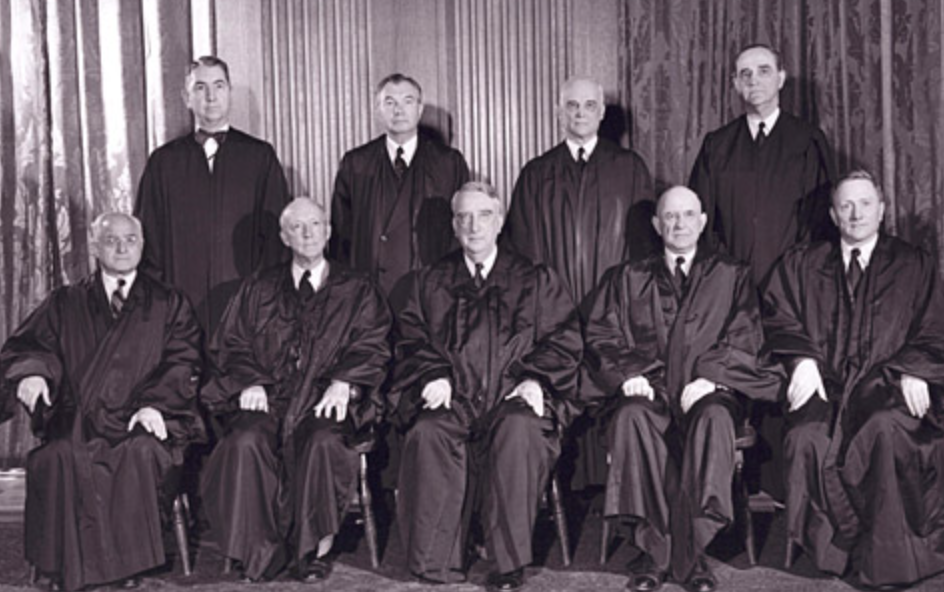
Vinson Court
(October 12, 1949 – September 8, 1953)
