= Ferguson v. Skrupa =

- Supreme Court of the United States

Argued March 20, 1963 Decided April 22, 1963
- Full case name: Ferguson v. Skrupa
- Citations: 372 U.S. 726 (more) 83 S. Ct. 1028; 10 L. Ed. 2d 93

Court membership
- Chief Justice Earl Warren Associate Justices Hugo Black · William O. Douglas; Tom C. Clark · John M. Harlan II; William J. Brennan Jr. · Potter Stewart; Byron White · Arthur Goldberg

Case opinions
- Majority: Black, joined by Warren, Douglas, Clark, Brennan, Stewart, White, Goldberg
- Concurrence: Harlan (in judgment)

Laws applied
- U.S. Const. amend. XIV

Ferguson v. Skrupa, 372 U.S. 726 (1963), was a case before the United States Supreme Court regarding the constitutionality of prohibiting debt adjustment.

== Background ==
A Kansas statute makes it a misdemeanor for any person to engage "in the business of debt adjusting" except as an incident to the lawful practice of law, "debt adjusting" being defined as the making of a contract whereby an adjuster, for consideration, agrees to distribute payments by a debtor among his creditors in accordance with an agreed upon plan. The plaintiff, engaged in the business of "debt adjusting," alleged that his business was a useful and desirable one, and that, therefore, an absolute prohibition of the business by the State would violate his rights under the due process clause of the Fourteenth Amendment. The District Court, sitting as a three-judge court, granted an injunction on the statute.

== Opinion of the court ==
On appeal, the Supreme Court of the United States reversed by a vote of 9-0. Justice Black delivered the majority opinion, which held that the statute did not violate the due process clause.

1) States had the power to legislate against what were found to be injurious practices in their internal commercial and business affairs so long as their laws did not run afoul of some specific federal constitutional prohibition or of some valid federal law. When the subject lay within the State's police power, debatable questions as to reasonableness were not for the courts but for the legislature.
2) The Court further held that the statute's exception of lawyers did not constitute a denial of equal protection of the laws to nonlawyers. Statutes created many classifications that did not deny equal protection; it was only invidious discrimination that offended the Constitution.

== Concurrence ==
Harlan, J., concurred in the judgment on the ground that the state statute bore a rational relation to a constitutionally permissible objective.
