= List of United States Supreme Court cases, volume 372 =

This is a list of all the United States Supreme Court cases from volume 372 of the United States Reports:

Case name	Citation	Date decided
New Jersey v. New York, S. & W.R. Co.	372 U.S. 1	1963
McCulloch v. Sociedad Nacional de Marineros	372 U.S. 10	1963
Incres S.S. Co. v. Maritime Workers	372 U.S. 24	1963
United States v. National Dairy Prods. Corp.	372 U.S. 29	1963
United States v. Gilmore	372 U.S. 39	1963
United States v. Patrick	372 U.S. 53	1963
Bantam Books, Inc. v. Sullivan	372 U.S. 58	1963
Northern Nat'l Gas Co. v. Kansas Corp. Comm'n	372 U.S. 84	1963
Gallick v. Baltimore & Ohio R.R. Co.	372 U.S. 108	1963
Schulde v. Commissioner	372 U.S. 128	1963
Kennedy v. Mendoza-Martinez	372 U.S. 144	1963
Simler v. Conner	372 U.S. 221	1963
Schneider v. Rusk	372 U.S. 224	1963
Board of Comm'rs v. City of Denver	372 U.S. 226	1963
Rudnicki v. Cox	372 U.S. 226	1963
King Cnty. v. F.L. Hartung Glass Co.	372 U.S. 227	1963
Chupka v. Lorenz-Schneider Co.	372 U.S. 227	1963
Sheldon v. Fannin	372 U.S. 228	1963
Edwards v. South Carolina	372 U.S. 229	1963
National Motor Freight Traffic Ass'n, Inc. v. United States	372 U.S. 246	1963
Harrison v. Missouri Pac. R.R. Co.	372 U.S. 248	1963
White Stag Mfg. Co. v. Ellis	372 U.S. 251	1963
Patterson v. City of Dallas	372 U.S. 251	1963
Bearden v. United States	372 U.S. 252	1963
White Motor Co. v. United States	372 U.S. 253	1963
Locomotive Eng'rs v. Baltimore & Ohio R.R. Co.	372 U.S. 284	1963
Townsend v. Sain	372 U.S. 293	1963
Gideon v. Wainwright	372 U.S. 335	1963
Douglas v. California	372 U.S. 353	1963
Gray v. Sanders	372 U.S. 368	1963
Fay v. Noia	372 U.S. 391	1963
Lane v. Brown	372 U.S. 477	1963
Draper v. Washington	372 U.S. 487	1963
Drivers v. Riss & Co.	372 U.S. 517	1963
Cole v. Manning	372 U.S. 521	1963
Craig v. Bennett	372 U.S. 521	1963
Fields v. South Carolina	372 U.S. 522	1963
Machinists v. Electrical Workers	372 U.S. 523	1963
Birmingham Ice & Cold Storage Co. v. S.R. Co.	372 U.S. 524	1963
Jefferson Warehouse & Cold Storage Co. v. United States	372 U.S. 525	1963
Walker v. United States	372 U.S. 526	1963
Robinson v. United States	372 U.S. 527	1963
Lynumn v. Illinois	372 U.S. 528	1963
Gibson v. Florida Legislative Investigation Committee	372 U.S. 539	1963
Bush v. Texas	372 U.S. 586	1963
Michigan Nat'l Bank v. Robertson	372 U.S. 591	1963
Tar Asphalt Trucking Co. v. United States	372 U.S. 596	1963
Peterson v. Circuit Ct.	372 U.S. 596	1963
Weyerhauser S.S. Co. v. United States	372 U.S. 597	1963
State Tax Comm'n v. Pacific States Cast Iron Pipe Co.	372 U.S. 605	1963
Harshman v. United States	372 U.S. 607	1963
Parker v. United States	372 U.S. 608	1963
Dugan v. Rank	372 U.S. 609	1963
Fresno v. California	372 U.S. 627	1963
Wolf v. Weinstein	372 U.S. 633	1963
Arrow Transp. Co. v. S.R. Co.	372 U.S. 658	1963
Machinists v. Central Airlines, Inc.	372 U.S. 682	1963
Dixilyn Drilling Corp. v. Crescent Towing & Salvage Co.	372 U.S. 697	1963
Basham v. Pennsylvania R.R. Co.	372 U.S. 699	1963
Lester C. Newton Trucking Co. v. United States	372 U.S. 702	1963
Johnson v. Mississippi	372 U.S. 702	1963
1963 term per curiam opinions of the Supreme Court of the United States	372 U.S. 703	1963
Karpel v. California	372 U.S. 703	1963
Salt River Project Agric. Improvement & Power Dist. v. Mesa	372 U.S. 704	1963
Daniels v. United States	372 U.S. 704	1963
Meyerkorth v. Nebraska	372 U.S. 705	1963
Johnson v. Dowd	372 U.S. 705	1963
Craig v. Indiana	372 U.S. 706	1963
Barber v. Virginia	372 U.S. 706	1963
Thompson v. Indiana	372 U.S. 707	1963
Holloman v. Virginia	372 U.S. 707	1963
Luckman v. Dunbar	372 U.S. 708	1963
Puntari v. Pennsylvania	372 U.S. 708	1963
Collins v. California	372 U.S. 708	1963
Fuqua v. Mississippi	372 U.S. 709	1963
Holmes v. California	372 U.S. 710	1963
Symons v. California	372 U.S. 711	1963
Tucker v. Indiana	372 U.S. 712	1963
Williams v. California	372 U.S. 713	1963
Colorado Anti-Discrimination Comm'n v. Continental Air Lines, Inc.	372 U.S. 714	1963
Ferguson v. Skrupa	372 U.S. 726	1963
Downum v. United States	372 U.S. 734	1963
ICC v. New York, N H. & H.R.R. Co.	372 U.S. 744	1963
Williams v. Zuckert	372 U.S. 765	1963
Rice v. Wainwright	372 U.S. 766	1963
Hatten v. Wainwright	372 U.S. 766	1963
Giles v. Maryland	372 U.S. 767	1963
Weigner v. Russell	372 U.S. 767	1963
Garner v. Pennsylvania	372 U.S. 768	1963
Vecchiolli v. Maroney	372 U.S. 768	1963
Watt v. Wainwright	372 U.S. 769	1963
Arnold v. Florida Div. of Corrections	372 U.S. 769	1963
Haynes v. Florida	372 U.S. 770	1963
Patterson v. Newport News Redevelopment & Housing Auth.	372 U.S. 770	1963
Tiller v. California	372 U.S. 771	1963
Patterson v. Newport News	372 U.S. 771	1963
Treadwell Constr. Co. v. United States	372 U.S. 772	1963
Walker v. Randolph	372 U.S. 773	1963
LaForge v. Wainwright	372 U.S. 774	1963
Tyler v. North Carolina	372 U.S. 775	1963
Patterson v. Maryland Penitentiary	372 U.S. 776	1963
Lindner v. Nash	372 U.S. 777	1963
Tull v. Wainwright	372 U.S. 778	1963
Douglas v. Wainwright	372 U.S. 779	1963
Jordan v. Wiman	372 U.S. 780	1963
Doughty v. Maxwell	372 U.S. 781	1963
Hartsfield v. Wainwright	372 U.S. 782	1963
