= Will v. Michigan Department of State Police =

Will v. Michigan Dept. of State Police
- Supreme Court of the United States

Argued 5 December, 1988 Decided 15 June, 1989
- Full case name: Ray Will v. Michigan Department of State Police, et al.
- Citations: 491 U.S. 58 (more) 109 S. Ct. 2304; 105 L. Ed. 2d 45; 1989 U.S. LEXIS 2975; 57 U.S.L.W. 4677; 49 Fair Empl. Prac. Cas. (BNA) 1664; 50 Empl. Prac. Dec. (CCH) ¶ 39,067

Holding
- Neither States nor state officials acting in their official capacities are "persons" within the meaning of 42 U.S.C. § 1983 when being sued for monetary damages.

Court membership
- Chief Justice William Rehnquist Associate Justices William J. Brennan Jr. · Byron White; Thurgood Marshall · Harry Blackmun; John P. Stevens · Sandra Day O'Connor; Antonin Scalia · Anthony Kennedy

Case opinions
- Majority: White, joined by Rehnquist, O'Connor, Scalia, Kennedy
- Dissent: Brennan, joined by Marshall, Blackmun, Stevens
- Dissent: Stevens

Laws applied
- U.S. Const. amend. XI, 42 U.S.C. § 1983

Will v. Michigan Dept. of State Police, 491 U.S. 58 (1989), was a case decided by the United States Supreme Court, in which the Court held that States and their officials acting in their official capacity are not persons when sued for monetary damages under the Civil Rights Act of 1871.

== Background information ==
Ray Will sued the Michigan State Police Department and the Director of the State Police in the Michigan Court of Claims alleging various violations of the Constitutions of the United States and Michigan as a claim under the Civil Rights Act of 1871, which had been codified into the United States Code at 42 U.S.C. § 1983. He claimed that he had been denied a promotion to a data systems analyst position in the police department because his brother had been a student activist and the subject of a "Red Squad" file maintained by the police. The Court of Claims, relying on a judgment in Will's favor by the Michigan Civil Service Commission, found that the police department and the director were "persons" within the meaning of 42 U.S.C. § 1983 and that the denial of the promotion was a violation of the Constitution of the United States.

Section 1983 provides:

Every person who, under color of any statute, ordinance, regulation, custom, or usage, of any State or Territory or the District of Columbia subjects, or causes to be subjected, any citizen of the United States or other person within the jurisdiction thereof to the deprivation of any rights, privileges, or immunities secured by the Constitution and laws shall be liable to the party injured in an action at law, suit in equity, or other proper proceeding for redress. For the purposes of this section, any Act of Congress applicable exclusively to the District of Columbia shall be considered to be a statute of the District of Columbia.

On appeal, the Michigan Court of Appeals vacated the judgment against the Department of State Police, holding that a State is not a person under § 1983, but remanded the case for determination of the possible immunity of the Director of State Police from liability for damages. The Michigan Supreme Court granted discretionary review and affirmed the Court of Appeals in part and reversed in part. The Michigan Supreme Court agreed that the State itself is not a person under § 1983, but also held that a state official acting in an official capacity was not such a person. The U.S. Supreme Court granted certiorari to hear the case.

== Opinion of the Court ==
In a 5–4 decision delivered by Justice White, the Court held that neither States nor state officials acting in their official capacities are "persons" within the meaning of 42 U.S.C. § 1983 when being sued for monetary damages. The Court found that § 1983 would not provide a federal forum for litigants who were seeking a remedy against a State for alleged deprivations of civil liberties because the Eleventh Amendment barred such suits unless the State has waived its sovereign immunity or unless Congress has exercised its power under § 5 of the Fourteenth Amendment to override that immunity. The majority found that even though state officials literally are persons, suits brought against them in their official capacity were not really suits against the officials, but were rather suits against the officials' offices, no different from a suit against the State itself. This ruling came despite the fact that the Court had previously ruled that a state official acting in an official capacity, when sued for injunctive relief, would be a person under §1983 because "official-capacity actions for prospective relief are not treated as actions against the State."

=== Justice Brennan's dissent ===
Justice Brennan wrote a dissent that was joined by Justice Marshall, Justice Blackmun and Justice Stevens. Brennan found that the Eleventh Amendment was inapplicable because Will had brought the case in State court and that in interpreting the word "person", the Court should take into account the "Dictionary Act", passed two months before § 1983, which said "[t]hat in all acts hereafter passed... the word 'person' may extend and be applied to bodies politic and corporate... unless the context shows that such words were intended to be used in a more limited sense..." In a previous case, Monell v. New York City Dept. of Social Services (1978), the Court had held that it was mandatory that the definition of the word "person" be construed to include "bodies politic and corporate" unless the statute under consideration "by its terms called for a deviation from this practice.

=== Justice Stevens' dissent ===
In a separate dissent, Justice Stevens wrote: "The Court having constructed an edifice for the purposes of the Eleventh Amendment on the theory that the State is always the real party in interest in a § 1983 official-capacity action against a state officer, I would think the majority would be impelled to conclude that the State is a "person" under § 1983." After agreeing with Justice Brennan's dissent, he wrote further,

the Court's construction draws an illogical distinction between wrongs committed by county or municipal officials on the one hand, and those committed by state officials, on the other. Finally, there is no necessity to import into this question of statutory construction doctrine created to protect the fiction that one sovereign cannot be sued in the courts of another sovereign. Aside from all of these reasons, the Court's holding that a State is not a person under § 1983 departs from a long line of judicial authority based on exactly that premise.

== See also ==
- Monroe v. Pape, 365 U.S. 167 (1961)
- Edelman v. Jordan, 415 U.S. 651 (1974)
- Monell v. New York City Dept. of Social Services, 436 U.S. 658 (1978)
- List of United States Supreme Court cases, volume 491
- List of United States Supreme Court cases
- Lists of United States Supreme Court cases by volume
- List of United States Supreme Court cases by the Rehnquist Court
