= Alec Ross (author) =

American author

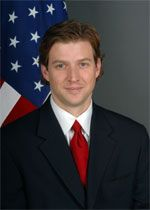

Personal details
- Born: November 30, 1971 (age 54) Charleston, West Virginia, U.S.
- Party: Democratic
- Spouse: Felicity
- Children: 3
- Education: Northwestern University (BA)
- Website: Official website

Alec Ross (born November 30, 1971) is an American author, technology policy analyst, and educator.

Ross was Senior Advisor for Innovation to Secretary of State Hillary Clinton for the duration of her term as Secretary of State. After leaving the Department of State in 2013 he joined the School of International and Public Affairs, Columbia University as a Senior Fellow. Ross subsequently became a visiting fellow at Johns Hopkins University. Ross is currently a distinguished adjunct professor at the University of Bologna Business School and a board partner at Amplo.

Ross is the author of two books, The Industries of the Future and The Raging 2020s: Companies, Countries, People – and the Fight for Our Future.

== Background ==
Ross was born and raised in Charleston, West Virginia. His father was a lawyer and his mother was a paralegal. At age 12 he moved to Italy for a year to live with his grandfather, Ray DePaulo, who was the commercial minister at the U.S. embassy in Rome. Ross attended college at Northwestern University.

After graduating in 1994 from Northwestern University with a B.A. in history, Ross moved to Baltimore to work at Booker T. Washington Middle School as a Teach for America AmeriCorps Member. Ross taught for two years and then accepted a position as special assistant to the president of the Enterprise Foundation.

In 2000, he co-founded One Economy, a nonprofit which aimed to provide technology and information to economically-limited groups; it ceased operations in 2012.

== Government service ==
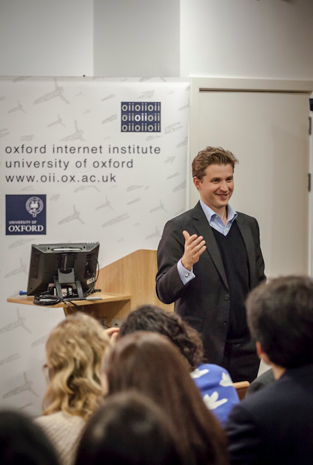
Ross teaching at Oxford University

During the 2008 presidential campaign, Ross played a role in developing then-Sen. Barack Obama's technology and innovation plan serving as the Convener for the Technology & Media Policy Committee.

In April 2009, Ross joined the State Department as Senior Advisor on Innovation. Ross was regarded as a "tech guru" at the State Department, recognized by then-Secretary of State Hillary Clinton as her "right hand" on efforts to promote "internet freedom". Ross focused on ways to improve government use of Web video and social networking sites for diplomacy, as well as ways to engage the modern public. While working as Senior Advisor on Innovation, Ross worked on initiatives such as wiring schools, adding wireless capacity to public works, text-message reminders to HIV patients, and assisting community transitions to mobile banking. Ross received a Distinguished Honor Award for his work at the State Department.

In addition to concerns over countries increasing surveillance capabilities, Ross highlighted cases where businesses prioritized profit motives over the potential harms of technologies. In 2011, he publicly "criticised the developers of internet surveillance equipment who were willing to sell their services to repressive regimes and allow governments to censor their citizens.”

In 2023, Ross was appointed to serve on the Maryland Economic Council by Governor Wes Moore.

== Politics ==
In April 2017, Ross launched a campaign for the Democratic nomination for Governor of Maryland in 2018. In February 2018 he announced as his running mate Julie Verratti, a craft brewery co-owner, former Senior Advisor at the Small Business Administration, and LGBT political activist. In June 2018, Ross finished seventh in the nine candidate Democratic primary with 2.4% of the votes.

== Personal life ==
Ross lives in Baltimore, Maryland and in Italy with his wife and their three children.

== Publications ==
=== Books ===
- 2021: Alec Ross. The Raging 2020s: Companies, Countries, People – and the Fight for Our Future. Henry Holt and Co.
- 2016: Alec Ross. The Industries of the Future. Simon & Schuster.

=== Articles ===
- 2021: "From Cold War to ‘Code War:’ Why government needs tech talent now." Fast Company.
- 2021: "The Pentagon's Army of Nerds." The Atlantic.
- 2016: "Want job security? Try online security." WIRED.
- 2016: Our Children and the Next Economy by Alec Ross.
- 2016: "The Language Barrier is About to Fall." The Wall Street Journal.
- 2013: Alec Ross. Light Up the West Bank: Want to reinvigorate the Middle East peace process? Start with 3G. Foreign Policy.
- 2012: Alec Ross. How connective tech boosts political change. CNN.
- 2011: Alec Ross and Ben Scott. 21st Century Statecraft. NATO Review.
- 2010: Alec Ross. Internet Freedom: Historic Roots and the Road Forward. The SAIS Review of International Affairs Volume 30, Number 2, Summer-Fall.
- 2007: Simon Rosenberg and Alec Ross. A Laptop in Every Backpack with Simon Rosenberg. NDN Globalization Initiative.
