= Los Angeles County v. Humphries =

- Supreme Court of the United States

Argued October 5, 2010 Decided November 30, 2010
- Full case name: Los Angeles County, California v. Craig Arthur Humphries, et al.
- Docket no.: 09–350
- Citations: 562 U.S. 29 (more) 131 S. Ct. 447; 178 L. Ed. 2d 460
- Argument: Oral argument

Case history
- Prior: Summary judgment granted to defendants, C.D. Cal.; reversed, 554 F.3d 1170 (9th Cir. 2009)

Holding
- The requirement that a municipality can only be liable under 42 U.S.C. § 1983 for an injury caused by that municipality's own "policy or custom" applies regardless of whether the plaintiff seeks prospective relief or monetary damages. Ninth Circuit reversed and remanded.

Court membership
- Chief Justice John Roberts Associate Justices Antonin Scalia · Anthony Kennedy; Clarence Thomas · Ruth Bader Ginsburg; Stephen Breyer · Samuel Alito; Sonia Sotomayor · Elena Kagan

Case opinion
- Majority: Breyer, joined by Roberts, Scalia, Kennedy, Thomas, Ginsburg, Alito, Sotomayor
- Kagan took no part in the consideration or decision of the case.

Laws applied
- 42 U.S.C. § 1983

Los Angeles County v. Humphries, 562 U.S. 29 (2010), is a decision by the Supreme Court of the United States that clarified one of the requirements for imposing liability on a municipality for violations of a federal right, in lawsuits brought under Section 1983 of the Civil Rights Act of 1871 (codified at 42 U.S.C. § 1983).

The Court had previously ruled in Monell v. Department of Social Services of the City of New York, 436 U.S. 658 (1978), that municipalities could only be liable under Section 1983 if the injury was a result of that municipality's "policy or custom." In Los Angeles County v. Humphries, the Court ruled that this "policy or custom" requirement applied regardless of whether the relief the plaintiff sought was monetary or prospective.

== Background of the case ==
=== Section 1983 of the 1871 Civil Rights Act ===
Section 1983 provides in part:

Every person who, under color of any [state] statute, ordinance, regulation, custom, or usage . . . subjects, or causes to be subjected, any ... other person ... to the deprivation of any rights ... secured by the Constitution and laws [of the United States], shall be liable to the party injured in an action at law, suit in equity, or other proper proceeding for redress.

In Monroe v. Pape, the Supreme Court had held that municipal entities were not "person[s]" under § 1983, based on its reading of the history of the Civil Rights Act of 1871. However, the Court overruled Monroe in Monell v. Department of Social Services of the City of New York, holding that municipalities were "persons" under § 1983, but that a municipality could be held liable under § 1983 only for its own violations of federal law. The violation must be caused by the "execution of [the municipality's] policy or custom", not simply when others have caused the violation such as if the municipality "employ[ed] a tortfeasor."

=== Lower court proceedings ===
The California Child Abuse and Neglect Reporting Act required law enforcement and other state agencies to investigate allegations of child abuse, report all instances of reported child abuse the agency found “not unfounded” to the California Department of Justice, even if they were "inconclusive or unsubstantiated", and required the department to include the reports in a Child Abuse Central Index. However, the Act did not provide procedures for reviewing whether a previously filed report was unfounded or for allowing individual people to challenge their inclusion in the index.

Two parents who were accused of child abuse but exonerated sought to have their names removed from the Index but were unable to convince the Los Angeles Sheriff's Department to remove them. They consequently filed a §1983 case against the Attorney General of California, the Los Angeles County Sheriff, two detectives in the sheriff's department, and the County of Los Angeles, seeking damages, an injunction, and a declaration that the defendants had deprived them of their constitutional rights by failing to create a procedural mechanism through which one could contest inclusion in the Index.

The Ninth Circuit held in favor of the plaintiffs. Los Angeles County appealed, arguing that it was not liable because, with respect to the county, the plaintiffs were not prevailing parties because the county was a municipal entity. It argued that under Monell's holding, a municipal entity is liable under § 1983 only if a municipal "policy or custom" caused a plaintiff to be deprived of a federal right and it was state policy, not county policy, that brought about any deprivation here.

== The Court's decision ==
In an 8-0 decision delivered by Justice Stephen Breyer, the Court concluded that Monell's holding applied to § 1983 claims against municipalities for prospective relief as well as to claims for damages.

== See also ==
- List of United States Supreme Court cases, volume 562
