= Carl Braden =

American activist (1914–1975)

- Born: June 24, 1914; New Albany, Indiana, U.S.
- Died: February 18, 1975 (aged 60); Louisville, Kentucky, U.S.
- Resting place: Eminence Cemetery, Eminence, Kentucky
- Known for: Braden v. United States
- Political party: Progressive Party of 1948
- Movement: Civil Rights Movement; Peace Movement
- Spouse: Anne Braden
- Children: 3

Carl Braden (June 24, 1914 – February 18, 1975) was a trade unionist, journalist, and activist who was known for his work in the civil rights movement.

== Biography ==
Braden was born in New Albany, Indiana.

He worked as a journalist for the Louisville Herald-Post, The Cincinnati Enquirer (1937–1945), The Louisville Times, and The Courier-Journal (1950–1954). He also wrote for other news services including The Harlan Daily Enterprise, the Knoxville Journal, the New York Daily News, the Chicago Tribune, the St. Louis Globe-Democrat, Newsweek, and the Federated Press.

== Early activism ==
In 1948, Carl Braden along with his wife Anne involved themselves in Henry Wallace's run on the Progressive Party for the presidency. Soon after Wallace's defeat, they left mainstream journalism to apply their talent as writers to the interracial left wing of the labor movement through the United Farm Equipment and Metal Workers of America union, representing Louisville's International Harvester employees.

== The Wade incident of 1954 ==
In 1954, directly confronting the practice of rigid racial segregation of residential neighborhoods, the Bradens assisted an African-American couple, Andrew and Charlotte Wade, who wanted to buy a suburban home but had been unable to do so due to housing discrimination. The Bradens purchased a house on behalf of the Wades in Shively, an all-white neighborhood in the Louisville metropolitan area, and deeded it over to the Wade family. It was reported by Braden that someone had thrown rocks through the windows of the house, burning a cross in front of it, and firing gunshots into the home – and then bombed the house (setting off explosives under the bedroom of the Wades' young daughter while the home was occupied), driving the Wades out and destroying the home. As a result of their actions, Carl Braden was charged with sedition. Although housing discrimination was illegal, the U.S. Supreme Court ruling specifically on a case in Louisville, Buchanan v. Warley, in 1917, charges were brought against Braden for hatching a communist plot to stir up a race war. A friend of the Wades was also charged with bombing the house to make it appear to have been done by others. No charges were filed regarding the other incidents. Braden denied the accusations that his purchase of the house and its subsequent bombing were all part of a "communist plot", and denied that he had ever been a member of the Communist Party. He was convicted on December 13, 1954, and was sentenced to 15 years in prison. Immediately upon his conviction, he was fired from the Courier-Journal, and he served seven months of his sentence before he was released on a $40,000 bond pending appeal – the highest bond ever set in Kentucky up to that time. His conviction was then overturned.

Carl's wife, Anne, carefully chronicled the ordeal and used it as the basis for her book The Wall Between, published in 1958, which was a runner-up for the National Book Award and featured a back-cover blurb from Eleanor Roosevelt.

== 1961 U.S. Supreme Court case ==
When compelled to appear before the House Un-American Activities Committee, Braden refused to answer questions posed to him, saying the questions were not relevant to the mandate of the committee and violated his First Amendment rights. The case was heard before the Supreme Court of the United States as Braden v. United States, 365 U.S. 431 (1961). The court ruled against Braden, saying his conviction was constitutional.

Braden was sentenced to a year in prison, and a drive for clemency in his case was led by Martin Luther King Jr. He was released after serving nine months of the sentence.

== Later activism ==
In 1967, the Bradens were again charged with sedition for protesting the practice of strip-mining in Pike County, Kentucky. They used this case to test the Kentucky sedition law, which was ruled unconstitutional in federal court.

The Bradens were blacklisted from local employment in Kentucky. They took jobs as field organizers for the Southern Conference Educational Fund (SCEF), developing their own media attention through SCEF's monthly newspaper, The Southern Patriot, and through numerous pamphlets and press releases publicizing major civil-rights campaigns. The Bradens were acclaimed by young student activists of the 1960s and among the Civil Rights Movement's most dedicated white allies.

The Southern Christian Leadership Conference hosted a reception honoring Frank Wilkinson and Carl Braden on April 30, 1961, the day before they went to jail for defying the House Un-American Activities Committee. Martin Luther King Jr. and James Dombrowski were present at this reception honoring Wilkinson and Braden.

== Personal life ==
In 1948, while working as a reporter in Kentucky, he met and married fellow journalist Anne Gambrell McCarty. The Bradens had three children. James, born September 15, 1951, who as of 2020, had lived and practiced law for over 35 years in San Francisco, California, and was a 1972 Rhodes Scholar at New College of University of Oxford and 1980 graduate of Harvard Law School, where he preceded Barack Obama as editor of the Harvard Law Review. Anita, born in 1953, died of a pulmonary disorder at the age of 11. Elizabeth, born in 1960, has worked as a teacher in many countries around the world, serving as of 2006 in that capacity in rural Ethiopia.

The Bradens dedicated their lives to impelling whites into the cause of justice for all people, and especially fought racism. After Carl's death, Anne Braden remained active in networks of anti-racist work. While raising their children, Carl and his wife Anne Braden remained deeply involved in the civil rights cause and the subsequent social movements it prompted from the 1960s to the 1970s, because of this they were frequent targets for attacks from southern white supremacists.

== Death ==
Carl Braden died suddenly of a heart attack on February 18, 1975, in Louisville, Kentucky. He is buried in Eminence Cemetery in Henry County, Eminence, Kentucky.

== See also ==
- History of Louisville, Kentucky
- List of people from the Louisville metropolitan area
