= Eddington =

Eddington or Edington may refer to:

== People ==
- Eddington Varmah, Liberian politician
- Arthur Eddington, English astronomer
- Eddington (surname), people with the surname

== Places ==
=== Australia ===
- Eddington, Victoria

=== United Kingdom ===
- Eddington, Berkshire
- Eddington, Cambridge
- Eddington, Kent
- Edington, Somerset
- Edington, Wiltshire
  - Edington Priory

=== United States ===
- Eddington, Maine
- Eddington, Pennsylvania
  - Eddington (SEPTA station)

== Other uses ==
- Battle of Edington, decisive victory by Alfred the Great
- Eddington (film), 2025 neo-Western thriller film by Ari Aster
- Eddington (horse), American thoroughbred racehorse

=== Named after Sir Arthur Eddington ===
- Eddington (crater), on the Moon
- Eddington (spacecraft), a cancelled ESA mission to search for extrasolar planets
- Eddington luminosity or Eddington limit, relating to the maximum mass of a star
- Eddington Medal, awarded by the Royal Astronomical Society
- Eddington number, the number of protons in the observable universe
- Eddington–Dirac number, alternative name for the Dirac large numbers hypothesis
- Eddington–Finkelstein coordinates, in the theory of general relativity
