= Ben Scott (policy advisor) =

American policy advisor (born 1977)

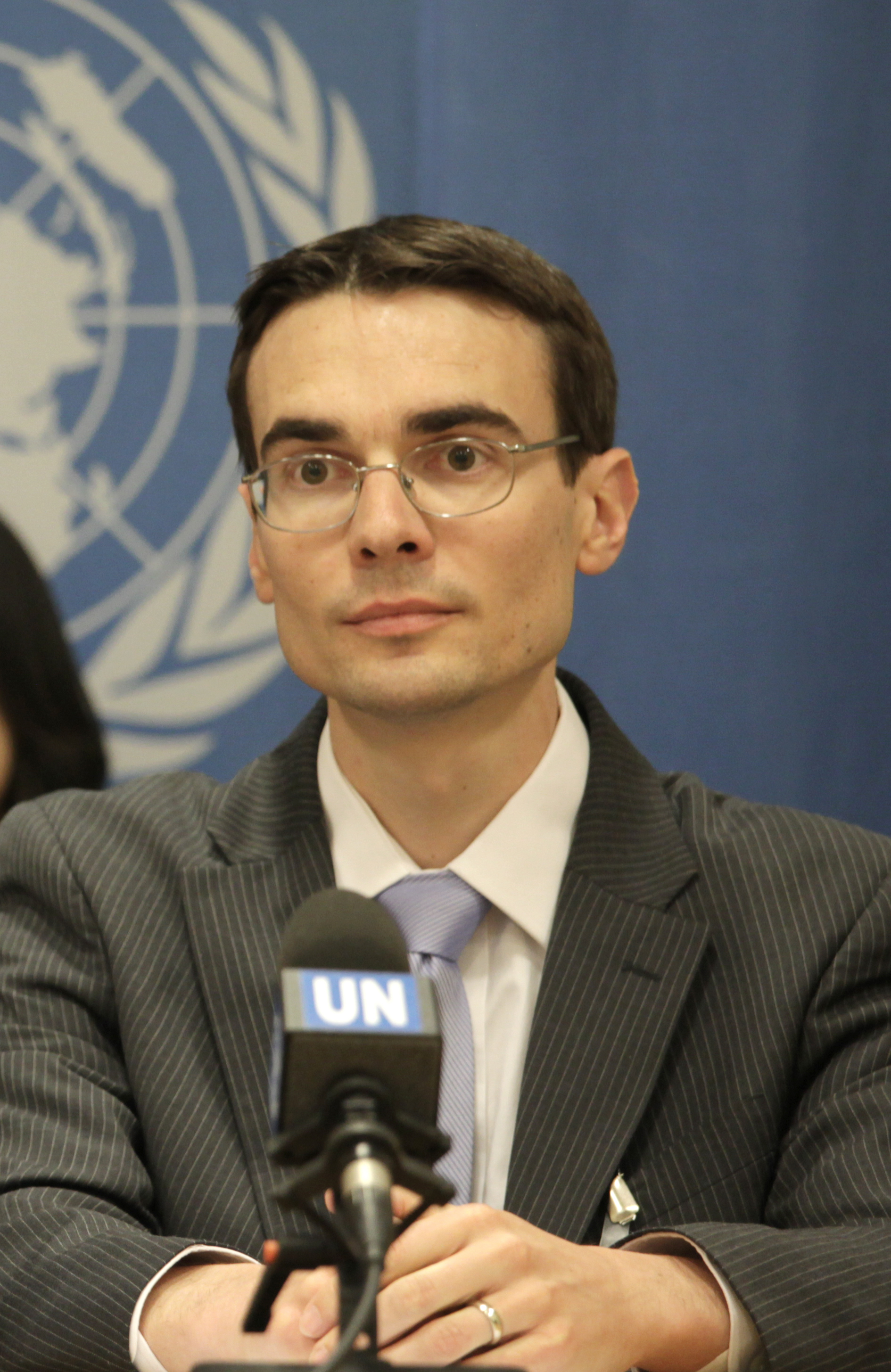
- Ben Scott at a conference in Berlin, Dec. 2018
- Born: May 14, 1977; Canyon, Texas, Texas, U.S.
- Education: Northwestern University; University of Illinois at Urbana-Champaign
- Occupation(s): Director of Policy and Advocacy
- Employer: Luminate

Ben Scott (born 14 May, 1977) is an American policy researcher and advocate.

He is director of policy and advocacy at Luminate, a part of the global philanthropic organization, the Omidyar Group. He is also on the management board of the Stiftung Neue Verantwortung (SNV) in Berlin, an independent technology policy think tank. He has been a part of the leadership at the SNV since 2014, and before that was a fellow there.

Previously, Scott was Senior Advisor at the New America Foundation in Washington, D.C., where he did work on the ad tech industry. During the 2016 presidential campaign, he was the coordinator of the Tech & Innovation Policy Advisory Group for Hillary Clinton. Previously, he was a Policy Advisor for Innovation at the US Department of State where he worked at the intersection of technology and foreign policy.

== Life ==
Scott grew up in Canyon, Texas. Scott is a 1995 graduate of the University of Illinois Laboratory High School. Scott is a graduate of Northwestern University. In 2010 he received his Doctorate from the Institute of Communications Research at the University of Illinois at Urbana-Champaign.

== Career ==
Scott has worked as a legislative telecommunications policy fellow for Rep. Bernie Sanders (I-Vt.) and as the Policy Director for Free Press, a national media reform organization. While at Free Press, Scott was described as a "driving force for 'net neutrality.'"

In May, 2010 Scott left Free Press to become Policy Advisor for Innovation at the U.S. State Department.

Since 2018 he has served as director of policy and advocacy at Luminate, part of the global philanthropic organization, the Omidyar Group.

== Bibliography ==
=== Books ===
- 2015 Ansgar Baums / Martin Schoessler / Ben Scott, editors. Kompendium Industrie 4.0. Berlin (in German)
- 2013 Ansgar Baums and Ben Scott, editors. Kompendium Digitale Standortpolitik. Berlin. (in German)
- 2005 Robert W. McChesney, Russell Newman and Ben Scott, editors. The Future of Media. New York: Seven Stories Press..
- 2004 Robert W. McChesney & Ben Scott, editors. Our Unfree Press: 100 Years of Radical Media Criticism. New York: The New Press.

=== Articles ===
- 2018: Dipayan Ghosh and Ben Scott. Digital Deceit II: A Policy Agenda to Fight Disinformation on the Internet. New America Foundation publication.
- 2018: Dipayan Ghosh and Ben Scott. Digital Deceit: The Technologies Behind Precision Propaganda on the Internet. New America Foundation publication.
- 2018: Ben Scott / Stefan Heumann / Phillipe Lorenz. Artificial Intelligence and Foreign Policy. Stiftung Neue Verantwortung publication.
- 2016: Ben Scott. Collaborative Policy Development: From Think Tank to Civic Enterprise. New America Foundation publication.
- 2011: Alec Ross and Ben Scott. 21st Century Statecraft. NATO Review.
- 2006: Sascha Meinrath and Ben Scott. Community Internet: Why Should Arts and Culture Funders Care. Grantmakers in the Arts Reader.
- 2003: Ben Scott and Sascha Meinrath. Media Reform Explodes onto American Political Scene. Public i. Vol. 3(10).
