= Eddington (surname) =

Eddington or Edington is a surname. Notable people with the surname include:

- Arthur Stanley Eddington (1882–1944), English astrophysicist
- E. Keith Eddington (1923–2007), American graphic designer
- Gordon Edington (born 1945), English businessman
- Patrick G. Eddington, CIA imagery analyst
- Paul Eddington (1927–1995), English actor
- Rod Eddington (born 1950), Australian businessman
- Sophie Edington (born 1984), Australian swimmer
- Stump Edington (1891–1969), American baseball player
- William Edington (died 1366), English bishop and administrator

== Fictional characters ==
- Michael Eddington, a character in Star Trek: Deep Space Nine
