= Anne Braden =

American civil rights activist, journalist, and educator (1924–2006)

Anne McCarty Braden
- Born: Anne Gambrell McCarty; July 28, 1924; Louisville, Kentucky, U.S.
- Died: March 6, 2006 (aged 81); Louisville, Kentucky, U.S.
- Education: Randolph-Macon Woman's College
- Occupations: Civil rights activist, journalist, educator
- Political party: Progressive Party of 1948
- Movement: Civil Rights Movement; Peace Movement
- Spouse: Carl Braden
- Awards: American Civil Liberties Union's Roger Baldwin Medal of Liberty

External videos
- "Anne Braden: Southern Patriot", California Newsreel
- A Riveting Biography of a Subversive Southerner: Anne Braden – Civil Rights (2003)

Anne McCarty Braden (July 28, 1924 – March 6, 2006) was an American civil rights activist, journalist, and educator dedicated to the cause of racial equality. She and her husband Carl bought a suburban house for an African American couple during Jim Crow. White neighbors burned crosses and bombed the house. During McCarthyism, Anne was charged with sedition. She wrote and organized for the southern civil rights movement before violations became national news. Anne was among the nation's most outspoken white anti-racist activists, organizing across racial divides in environmental, women's, and anti-nuclear movements.

== Background ==
Born in Louisville, Kentucky, on July 28, 1924, to Gambrell N. McCarty and Anita D. (Crabbe) McCarty and raised in rigidly segregated Anniston, Alabama, Braden grew up in a white, middle-class family that accepted southern racial mores wholeheartedly. A devout Episcopalian, Braden was bothered by racial segregation, but never questioned it until her college years at Randolph-Macon Woman's College in Lynchburg, Virginia. As she grew older she experienced what has been framed as a "racial conversion narrative", "a conversion of almost religious intensity" "turning myself inside out and upside down". The experience that so affected her, in 1946, was witnessing a march of black veterans to the Birmingham courthouse, led by Louis Burnham of the Southern Negro Youth Congress, demanding the right to vote; with Braden covering the story as a reporter for the Birmingham News.

After working on newspapers in Anniston and Birmingham, Alabama, Anne Braden returned to Kentucky as a young adult to write for The Louisville Times. She became a supporter of the Civil Rights Movement at a time when it was unpopular among southern whites.

Either you find a way to oppose the evil, or the evil becomes part of you and you are a part of it, and it winds itself around your soul like the arms of an octopus... If I did not oppose it, I was... responsible for its sins.

— Anne Braden

While working at The Louisville Times, Anne met fellow newspaperman Carl Braden, a left-wing trade unionist. The couple married in 1948. Both were deeply involved in the civil rights cause and the subsequent social movements it prompted from the 1960s to the 1970s.

== Career ==
=== Early activism ===
In 1948, Anne and Carl Braden immersed themselves in Henry Wallace's run on the Progressive Party for the presidency. Soon after Wallace's defeat, they left mainstream journalism to apply their writing talents to the interracial left wing of the labor movement through the FE (Farm and Equipment Workers) Union, representing Louisville's International Harvester employees.

Even as the postwar labor movement splintered and grew less militant, civil rights causes heated up. In 1950, Anne Braden spearheaded a hospital desegregation drive in Kentucky. She endured her first arrest in 1951 when she led a delegation of southern white women organized by the Civil Rights Congress to Mississippi to protest the execution of Willie McGee, an African American man controversially convicted of the rape of a white woman, Willette Hawkins.

=== Wade case ===
In 1954, Andrew and Charlotte Wade, an African American couple who knew the Bradens through association, approached them with a proposal that would drastically alter all lives involved. Like many other Americans after World War II, the Wades wanted to buy a house in a suburban neighborhood. Because of Jim Crow housing practices, the Wades had been unsuccessful for months in their quest to purchase a home on their own. The Bradens, not wavering in their support for African American civil rights, agreed to purchase the home for the Wades.

On May 15, 1954, Wade and his wife spent their first night in their new home in the Louisville suburb of Shively, Kentucky. Upon discovering that black people had moved in, white neighbors burned a cross in front of the house, shot out windows, and condemned the Bradens for buying it on the Wades' behalf. The Wades moved in two days before the U.S. Supreme Court's landmark condemnation of public schools' racial segregation policy in Brown v. Board of Education, Topeka, Kansas. Six weeks later, amid constant community tensions, the Wades' new house was dynamited one evening while they were out.

While Vernon Bown (an associate of the Wades and the Bradens) was indicted for the bombing, the actual bombers were never sought nor brought to trial. McCarthyism affected the ordeal. Instead of addressing the segregationists' violence, the investigators alleged that the Bradens and others helping the Wades were affiliated with the Communist Party, and made that the main subject of concern. White supremacists who were pro-segregation at the time charged that these alleged Communists had engineered the bombing to provide a cause célèbre and fund-raising opportunity, but this was never proven.

Nonetheless, in October 1954, Anne and Carl Braden and five other whites were charged with sedition. After a sensationalized trial, Carl Braden—the perceived ringleader—was convicted of sedition and sentenced to 15 years' imprisonment. As Anne and the other defendants awaited a similar fate, Carl served eight months, but got out on $40,000 bond after a U.S. Supreme Court decision (Pennsylvania v. Nelson in 1956) invalidated state sedition laws (Steven Nelson had been arrested under the Pennsylvania Sedition Law but the federal Smith Act superseded it). All charges were dropped against Braden, but the Wades moved to the traditionally black west Louisville.

=== Southern Conference Educational Fund ===
Blacklisted from local employment, the Bradens took jobs as field organizers for the Southern Conference Educational Fund (SCEF), a small, New Orleans–based civil rights organization whose mission was to solicit white southern support for the beleaguered southern civil rights movement. In the years before southern civil rights violations made national news, the Bradens developed their own media, both through SCEF's monthly newspaper, The Southern Patriot, and through numerous pamphlets and press releases publicizing major civil rights campaigns.

Her 1958 book The Wall Between helped place the Bradens among the civil rights movement's most dedicated white allies.

Anne Braden and her husband Carl were two of the most hated people of the 1950s and 1960s by the powers-that-were in the American south. As whites of impeccable southern credentials, they gave lie to the myth that all southern whites opposed the civil rights movement—and that drove the racists wild.—David Nolan

Carl Braden died suddenly of a heart attack on February 18, 1975. After Carl's death, Anne Braden remained among the nation's most outspoken white anti-racist activists. She instigated the formation of a new regional multiracial organization, the Southern Organizing Committee for Economic and Social Justice (SOC), which initiated battles against environmental racism. She became an instrumental voice in the Rainbow/PUSH Coalition of the 1980s and in the two Jesse Jackson presidential campaigns, as well as organizing across racial divides in the new environmental, women's, and anti-nuclear movements that sprang up in that decade.

In 1977, Braden became an associate of the Women's Institute for Freedom of the Press (WIFP). WIFP is an American nonprofit publishing organization. The organization works to increase communication between women and connect the public with forms of women-based media.

In 2005, she joined Louisville antiwar demonstrations in a wheelchair. She cofounded the Kentucky Alliance Against Racist and Political Repression and continued involvement in local activism addressing modern concerns of police brutality, environmental racism, and LGBT rights.

== Personal life and death ==
In 1948, she married fellow newspaperman Carl Braden, a left-wing trade unionist.

The Bradens had three children: James, a Rhodes Scholar and a 1980 graduate of Harvard Law School where he was editor of the Harvard Law Review; Anita, born in 1953, who died of a pulmonary disorder at age 11, and Elizabeth, born in 1960, who has worked as a teacher in many countries around the world, serving as of 2006 in that capacity in rural Ethiopia.

Anne Braden died on March 6, 2006, at Jewish Hospital in Louisville and was buried at Eminence Cemetery in Eminence, Kentucky. Only three days earlier, she had completed a proposal for a local activist summer camp. She was remembered by many in the civil rights movement, including Ira Grupper, Dorie Ladner, David Nolan, Efia Nwangaza, and Gwendolyn Patton.

== Awards ==
Braden received the American Civil Liberties Union's first Roger Baldwin Medal of Liberty in 1990 for her contributions to civil liberties. As she aged, her activism focused more on Louisville, where she remained a leader in anti-racist drives and taught social justice history classes at University of Louisville and Northern Kentucky University.

== Legacy ==
After her death, the Anne Braden Institute for Social Justice Research was established at the University of Louisville in November 2006 and was officially opened on April 4, 2007. The institute focuses on social justice globally, but concentrates on the southern United States and the Louisville area.

The alternative hip hop group Flobots paid tribute with the song "Anne Braden" on their 2007 album Fight With Tools. The track includes several audio samples of Anne Braden, describing her life and thoughts on race in her own words.

== Works ==
In 1958 Anne wrote The Wall Between, a memoir of their sedition case. One of the few books of its time to unpack the psychology of white southern racism from within, it was praised by human rights leaders such as Martin Luther King Jr. and Eleanor Roosevelt, and became a runner-up for the National Book Award.

From the 1980s into the 2000s, Braden wrote for Southern Exposure, Southern Changes, and the National Guardian and Fellowship.

- Braden, Anne (1958). The Wall Between. New York: Monthly Review Press.
- Braden, Anne (1964). House Un-American Activities Committee: Bulwark of Segregation. Los Angeles, California: National Committee to Abolish the House Un-American Activities Committee.
- Braden, Anne (1981). "Preface". In Reed, David (ed.). Education for building a people's movement. Boston, MA: South End Press.
- Braden, Anne (June 30, 1965). "The Southern Freedom Movement in Perspective". Monthly Review. 17 (3): 1. doi:10.14452/MR-017-03-1965-07_1.
- Anne Braden : Southern Patriot (1924-2006) Directed by Anne Lewis and Mimi Pickering; Peter Pearce - camera; Dirk Powell - score; Appalshop Film & Video; California Newsreel (Firm). San Francisco, Calif. : California Newsreel, [2012].

== Archives ==
- Anne Braden papers, 1920s–2006, University of Louisville Libraries
- Braden (Anne McCarty) papers, 1920s–2006 1970s–2006 at the University of Kentucky Special Collections Research Center
- Carl and Anne Braden papers at the University of Kentucky Special Collections Research Center
- Anne Braden Oral History Project, Louie B. Nunn Center for Oral History, University of Kentucky Libraries, Lexington, Kentucky
- Anne Braden papers, The Civil Rights History Project: Survey of Collections and Repositories, Library of Congress
- Southern Conference Educational Fund Records, L1991-13, Southern Labor Archives. Special Collections and Archives, Georgia State University, Atlanta, Georgia
- SNCC Digital Gateway: Anne Braden, Documentary website created by the SNCC Legacy Project and Duke University, telling the story of the Student Nonviolent Coordinating Committee & grassroots organizing from the inside-out

== See also ==
- History of Louisville, Kentucky
- List of people from the Louisville metropolitan area
