= Braden v. United States =

Carl Braden v. United States
- Supreme Court of the United States

Argued November 17, 1960 Decided February 27, 1961
- Full case name: Carl Braden v. United States
- Citations: 365 U.S. 431 (more) 81 S. Ct. 584; 5 L. Ed. 2d 653

Case history
- Prior: 272 F.2d 653 (5th Cir. 1959); cert. granted, 362 U.S. 960 (1960).

Holding
- The Court held that the conviction was based on his refusal to answer questions posed to him by the House Un-American Activities Committee and did not violate his First Amendment rights, and was therefore constitutional.

Court membership
- Chief Justice Earl Warren Associate Justices Hugo Black · Felix Frankfurter; William O. Douglas · Tom C. Clark; John M. Harlan II · William J. Brennan Jr. Charles E. Whittaker · Potter Stewart

Case opinions
- Majority: Stewart, joined by Frankfurter, Clark, Harlan, Whittaker
- Dissent: Black, joined by Warren, Douglas
- Dissent: Douglas, joined by Warren, Black, Brennan

Laws applied
- U.S. Const. amend. I; 2 U.S.C. § 192

Braden v. United States, 365 U.S. 431 (1961), was a case in which the Supreme Court of the United States held that the conviction of the petitioner, Carl Braden, based on his refusal to answer questions posed to him by the House Un-American Activities Committee, did not violate his First Amendment rights and was constitutional.

== Background ==
The House Un-American Activities Committee (also called HUAC) was a committee within the United States House of Representatives dedicated to identifying agents of Fascism or Communism, ideologies deemed "un-American". With the end of World War II and the rise of the Cold War, HUAC, now a standing committee, became more narrowly focused on Communist activities. While HUAC was a political asset to some of its members, its activities were highly controversial, to the point where former President Harry S. Truman called it the "most un-American thing in the country today" in 1959. By 1975 it would be disbanded.

Despite the controversy, the HUAC was still very active in 1961, when it was investigating allegations of "Communist infiltration into basic industries in the South and Communist Party propaganda activities in the South". Among the witnesses called in this investigation was Carl Braden. However, when Braden was questioned by the committee, he refused to answer, based on his assertion that the questions were not relevant to the committee, and that the questions also violated his First Amendment rights. He was then convicted under 2 U.S.C. § 192, which makes it a misdemeanor offence to refuse to answer "pertinent" questions posed by the committee.

== Opinion of the Court ==
Braden's conviction was sustained and held that the conviction was based on his refusal to answer questions posed to him by the HUAC and did not violate his First Amendment rights and was therefore constitutional.

== See also ==
- Wilkinson v. United States, 365 U.S. 399 (1961)
