= Burton v. Wilmington Parking Authority =

Coordinates: 39.7450°N 75.5496°W

- Supreme Court of the United States

Argued February 21, 1961 Decided April 17, 1961
- Full case name: William H. Burton, Appellant, v. Wilmington Parking Authority, et al.
- Citations: 365 U.S. 715 (more) 81 S. Ct. 856; 6 L. Ed. 2d 45; 1961 U.S. LEXIS 1297

Case history
- Prior: Delaware Supreme Court

Holding
- In view of all the circumstances of this case, including the facts that the restaurant was physically and financially an integral part of a public building, built and maintained with public funds, devoted to a public parking service, and owned and operated by an agency of the State for public purposes, the State was a joint participant in the operation of the restaurant, and its refusal to serve appellant violated the Equal Protection Clause of the Fourteenth Amendment.

Court membership
- Chief Justice Earl Warren Associate Justices Hugo Black · Felix Frankfurter; William O. Douglas · Tom C. Clark; John M. Harlan II · William J. Brennan Jr. Charles E. Whittaker · Potter Stewart

Case opinions
- Majority: Clark, joined by Warren, Black, Douglas, Brennan
- Concurrence: Stewart
- Dissent: Frankfurter
- Dissent: Harlan, joined by Whittaker

Laws applied
- Fourteenth Amendment, the Delaware Code

Burton v. Wilmington Parking Authority, 365 U.S. 715 (1961), was a United States Supreme Court case that decided that the Equal Protection Clause applies to private business that operates in a relationship to a government that is close to the point that it becomes a "state actor."

== Background ==
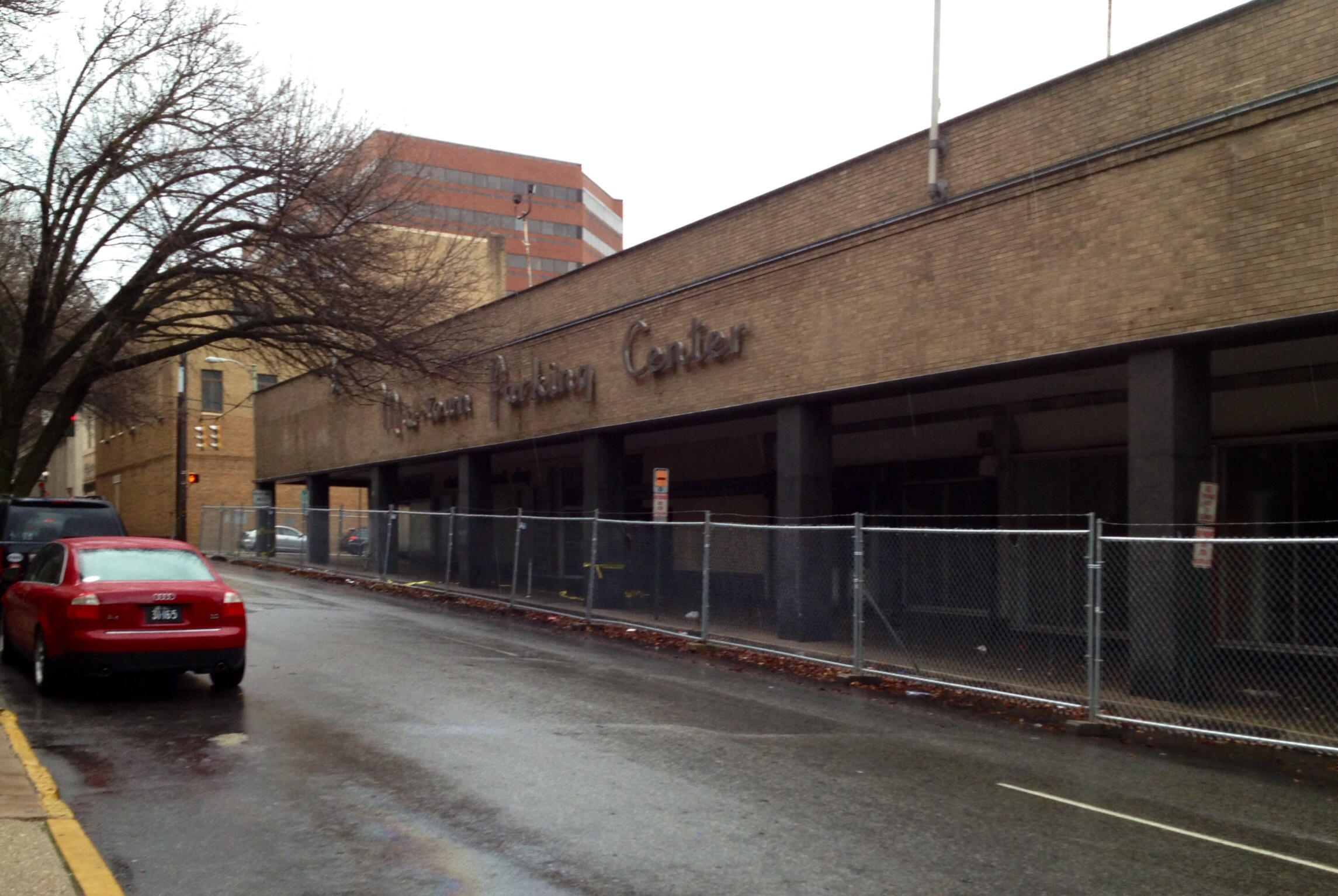
Former location of restaurant, on far end, just prior to garage demolition

The Wilmington Parking Authority (WPA) is a government agency established by the State of Delaware in 1951 to encourage parking access. Although a state agency, the WPA worked closely with the City of Wilmington, which would issue the bonds for initial construction. The first project of the new agency was to build the Midtown Parking Center, a garage on the downtown block in Wilmington between 8th, Orange, 9th, and Shipley Streets. The city's economic analysis showed that the bonds could be repaid only if the parking income was augmented with rental income from a strip of storefronts built along 9th Street. The Eagle Coffee Shoppe, Inc., was one of the tenants and signed a 20-year lease in 1957.

Shortly after it opened, seven black local Chrysler workers were arrested for trespass when they staged a sit-in at the counter and refused to leave until they were served in an unsuccessful attempt to desegregate the restaurant. Louis L. Redding, a local civil rights attorney who helped litigate Brown v. Board of Education, became involved in the dispute. Rather than appeal those arrests, he had City Councilman William H. Burton park at the garage and then go to the Eagle Coffee Shoppe, where he was refused service explicitly because he was an African American.

== Prior litigation ==
A suit was filed in 1958 on Burton's behalf against the parking authority and the coffeehouse by claiming that the discrimination was sanctioned by the state by virtue of the landlord and the close relationship between the business and state agency. The lawsuit sought to force the Eagle Coffee Shoppe to integrate its dining room or to terminate its lease.

The Delaware Court of Chancery ruled that the government lease to a discriminating company was a violation of Burton's civil rights. However, the Delaware Supreme Court overruled that decision found that Eagle Coffee Shoppe's refusal to serve black clientele was legal because of a state law, 24 Del.C. § 1501, which allowed restaurants to refuse service if a person was disturbing other customers.

No keeper of an inn, tavern, hotel, or restaurant, or other place of public entertainment or refreshment of travelers, guests, or customers shall be obliged, by law, to furnish entertainment or refreshment to persons whose reception or entertainment by him would be offensive to the major part of his customers, and would injure his business.

Redding then appealed to the federal courts on behalf of Burton.

== Decision ==
The majority opinion, written by Justice Tom Clark, looked closely at the specifics of the financing of the parking garage and the building plan's dependence on retail rental income to determine that the Eagle Coffee Shoppe was integral to the government purpose of building and financing a parking garage. Also, a close symbiosis was noted between retail businesses having nearby parking and a garage being close to shopping opportunities to the point that they were a "joint participant." Based on the close interplay between the government and the company, the court found that the exclusion of black customers was a violation even though no government agency was directly discriminating: "the exclusion of appellant under the circumstances shown to be present here was discriminatory state action in violation of the Equal Protection Clause of the Fourteenth Amendment."

Justice Potter Stewart concurred with the verdict but felt that since no evidence had been submitted that Burton had bothered other customers, the Delaware law allowing restaurants to exclude customers was a pretense to allow racial discrimination and so was itself unconstitutional. In dissent, Justice John Harlan II, joined by Charles Whittaker, found the state court ruling so ambiguous that they preferred to return the case to the lower court for clarification. Justice Felix Frankfurter wrote a separate dissent that also called for returning the case to the state court.

== Legal consequences ==
The case broadened the reach of the Equal Protection Clause to include not only direct government action but also actions by private companies acting in close relationship to a government agency. The impact of the ruling was later limited in Moose Lodge No. 107 v. Irvis to situations in which the government support of the business was substantial before private discrimination could be considered a "state action."

== See also ==
- List of United States Supreme Court cases, volume 365
