= Sascha Meinrath =

British entrepreneur and technologist

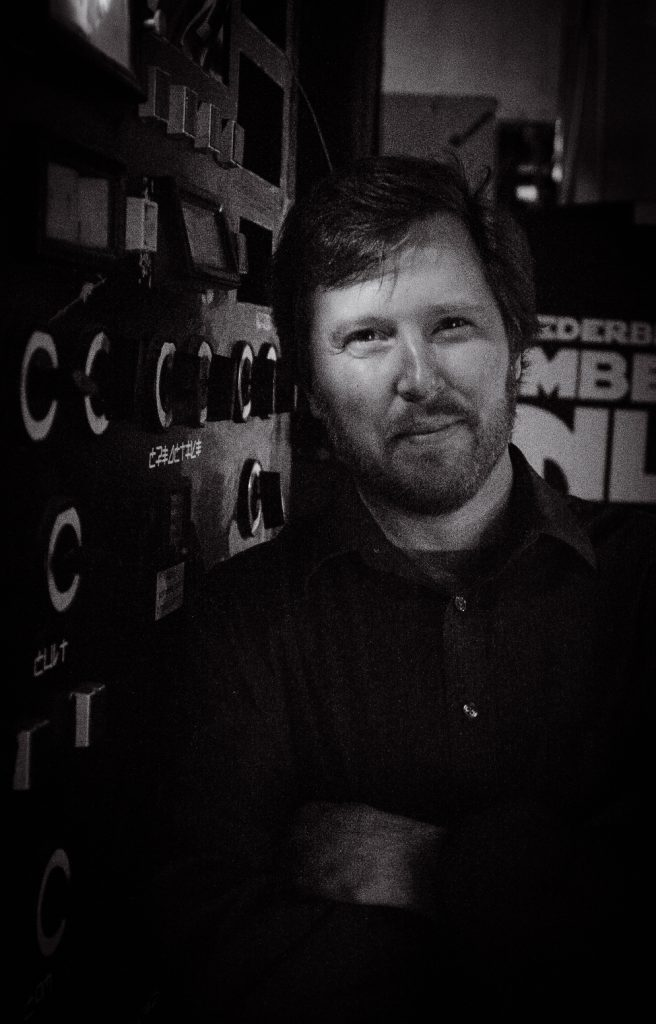
- Born: New Haven, Connecticut
- Education: Yale University; University of Illinois at Urbana-Champaign
- Occupations: Director, X-Lab & Palmer Chair in Telecommunications, Penn State University
- Employer: Penn State University

Sascha Meinrath is an American policy activist and educator. He is currently the Palmer Chair in Telecommunications at Penn State University.

Meinrath founded the Open Technology Institute in 2008 and directed the Institute while also serving as Vice President of the New America Foundation.

Meinrath has founded a number of other organizations, among them X-Lab (a technology think tank), the CUWiN Foundation, and the Open Source Wireless Coalition. He is also known for his work in opposition to the Stop Online Piracy Act and the PROTECT IP Act (SOPA and PIPA).

== Background ==
Sascha Meinrath was born in New Haven, Connecticut. He received his Bachelor of Arts in Psychology from Yale University in 1997, and a Masters of Arts in Social-Ecological Psychology from the University of Illinois at Urbana-Champaign. He is the son of a Brazilian immigrant to the U.S., and holds Brazilian, German, and U.S. citizenship.

== Career ==
In 2004 Meinrath worked as a policy analyst for Free Press, a national media reform organization. In 2007 he moved to Washington, D.C., to become the Research Director of the Wireless Futures Program at the New America Foundation. He launched the Open Technology Institute at New America Foundation in 2008, and became a Vice-President at New America and a co-founder of the Future of War Initiative. He is a professor at Pennsylvania State University.

Meinrath launched the Open Technology Institute at the New America Foundation in 2008.

As of 2020, Meinrath serves on the board of Defending Rights & Dissent, the American Indian Policy Institute, Metamesh Wireless Communities, Brave New Software Foundation, and the Acorn Active Media Foundation.

=== Commotion Wireless ===
Commotion was an open source “device-as-infrastructure” communication platform that promised to integrate users’ existing cell phones, Wi-Fi enabled computers, and other wireless-capable devices to create community- and metro-scale, peer-to-peer communications networks. Commotion was deployed with Occupy DC as well in the aftermath of Hurricane Sandy.

After an initial flurry of attention, the project did not prove sustainable. The code development profiles for the project have not been updated since 2016, and the project's website has been offline since approximately September 2024.

=== Opposition to SOPA and PIPA ===
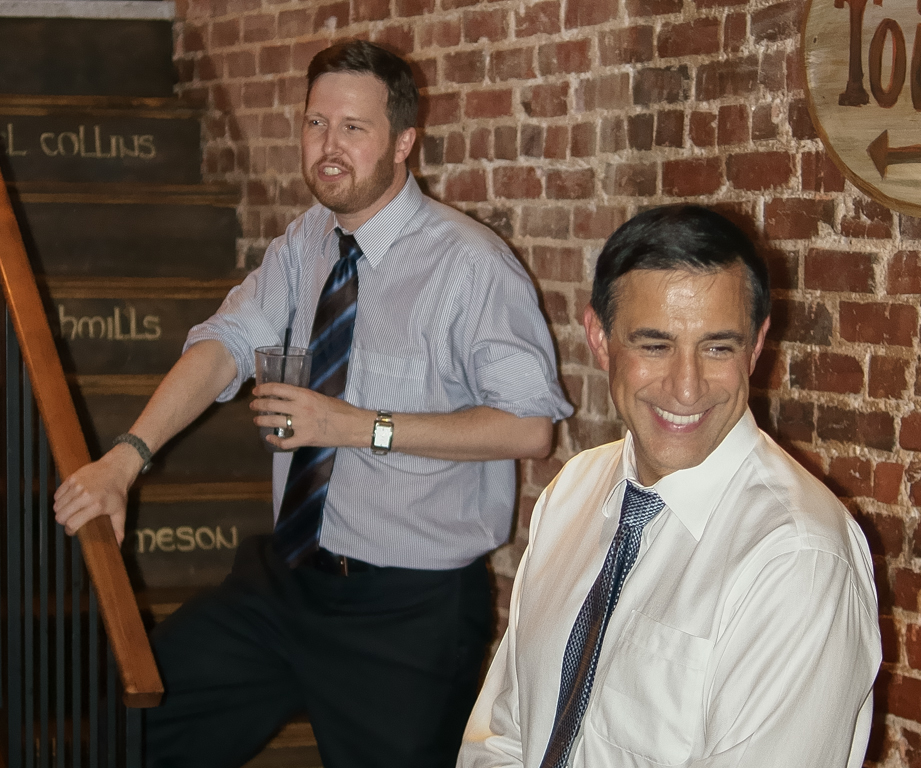
Meinrath and Darrell Issa at Internet Defense League DC Launch

Meinrath opposed the Stop Online Piracy Act (SOPA) and the Protect IP Act (PIPA).

=== International Summit for Community Wireless Networks ===
Meinrath hosts the regular International Summit for Community Wireless Networks (IS4CWN), a convening of leaders in community networks, mesh networking, and next-generation wireless technologies. The first summit was held in Urbana-Champaign, Illinois in 2004 launching the community wireless movement. Past locations have also included St. Charles, Missouri, Washington, DC, and Vienna, Austria. The eighth and most recent IS4CWN was held in October, 2013 in Berlin, Germany.

== Publications ==
- 2013: Sascha D. Meinrath, James Losy and Benjamin Lennett. Internet Freedom, Nuanced Digital Dividess, and the Internet Craftsman. Afterward. The Digital Divide: The internet and social inequality in international perspective. Eds. Massimo Ragnedda and Glenn W. Muscher. London and New York: Routeledge.
- 2011: Sascha D. Meinrath, James Losey, and Victor Pickard. Digital Feudalism: Enclosures and Erasures from Digital Rights Management to the Digital Divide. The CommLaw Conspectus: Journal of Communications Law and Policy. Volume 19, Issue 2 (2011).
- 2010. Sascha D. Meinrath and Victor Pickard. The Rise of the Intranet Era: Politics and Media in an Age of Communications (R)evolution. Chapter for Kevin Howley (Ed.), Globalization and Communicative Democracy: Community Media in the 21st Century, London: Sage Publications.
- 2007. Sascha D. Meinrath and Victor Pickard. The New Network Neutrality: Criteria for Internet Freedom. Accepted for Publication: International Journal of Communications Law and Policy.
- 2007. S. Bradner, k.c. claffy, and Sascha D. Meinrath. The (un)Economic Internet. IEEE Internet Computing. Vol. 11(3). Pages 53–58.
- 2007 Sascha D. Meinrath and k.c. claffy. COMMONS Strategy Workshop Final Report: Cooperative Measurement and Modeling of Open Networked Systems.
- 2006: Sascha Meinrath and Ben Scott. Community Internet: Why Should Arts and Culture Funders Care. Grantmakers in the Arts Reader.
- 2003: Ben Scott and Sascha Meinrath. Media Reform Explodes onto American Political Scene. Public i. Vol. 3(10).
