= Pembaur v. City of Cincinnati =

Pembaur v. Cincinnati
- Supreme Court of the United States

Argued December 2, 1985 Decided March 25, 1986
- Full case name: Pembaur v. City of Cincinnati
- Citations: 475 U.S. 469 (more) 106 S. Ct. 1292; 89 L. Ed. 2d 452

Holding
- Following the "official policy" standard set forth in Monell establishing municipal liability under 42 U.S.C. §1983, municipal liability may be imposed for a single decision by municipal policymakers under appropriate circumstances; if the decision to adopt a particular course of action is directed by those who establish governmental policy, the municipality is equally responsible whether that action is to be taken only once or repeatedly.

Court membership
- Chief Justice Warren E. Burger Associate Justices William J. Brennan Jr. · Byron White; Thurgood Marshall · Harry Blackmun; Lewis F. Powell Jr. · William Rehnquist; John P. Stevens · Sandra Day O'Connor

Case opinions
- Majority: Brennan (parts I, II-A, II-C), joined by White, Marshall, Blackmun, Stevens; O'Connor (except II-C)
- Plurality: Brennan (II-B), joined by White, Marshall, Blackmun
- Concurrence: White
- Concurrence: Stevens (in part and in judgment)
- Concurrence: O'Connor (in part and in judgment)
- Dissent: Powell, joined by Burger, Rehnquist

Laws applied
- 42 U.S.C. § 1983

Pembaur v. City of Cincinnati, 475 U.S. 469 (1986), is a United States Supreme Court case that clarified a previous case, Monell v. Department of Social Services (1978), and established that municipalities can be held liable even for a single decision that is improperly made.

== Background ==
A physician and owner of a medical clinic in Cincinnati, Ohio was indicted for fraud regarding welfare payments from state agencies. As part of the trial, subpoenas were issued for two clinic employees. The employees failed to appear in court, and warrants were issued for their arrest. Two county deputies went to the clinic to serve the warrants, but the doctor and another employee barred the entrance. Cincinnati officers arrived and attempted to persuade the doctor to open the door.

Eventually the deputies were told by the county prosecutor to "go in and get" the employees in question. Subsequently, the door was chopped down and the deputies entered but were unable to locate the employees. The doctor was then charged and convicted with obstructing police in their authorized duties.

The doctor filed for damages. The district court dismissed based on Monell—that the officers were not acting pursuant to the official policy described in Monell—and the court of appeals affirmed.

== Decision ==
The Supreme Court reversed and remanded. Here is the syllabus summary: "1. The "official policy" requirement of Monell was intended to distinguish acts of the municipality from acts of the municipality's employees, and thereby make clear that municipal liability is limited to actions for which the municipality is actually responsible. Monell held that recovery from a municipality is limited to acts that are, properly speaking, "of the municipality," i.e., acts that the municipality has officially sanctioned or ordered. With this understanding, it is plain that municipal liability may be imposed for a single decision by municipal policymakers under appropriate circumstances. If the decision to adopt a particular course of action is directed by those who establish governmental policy, the municipality is equally responsible whether that action is to be taken only once or to be taken repeatedly. Pp. 475 U. S. 477-481.

"2. It was error to dismiss petitioner's claim against the county. Ohio law authorizes the County Sheriff to obtain instructions from the County Prosecutor. The Sheriff followed the practice of delegating certain decisions to the Prosecutor where appropriate. In this case, the Deputy Sheriffs received instructions from the Sheriff's Office to follow the orders of the County Prosecutor, who made a considered decision based on his understanding of the law and commanded the Deputy Sheriffs to enter petitioner's clinic. That decision directly caused a violation of petitioner's Fourth Amendment rights. In ordering the Deputy Sheriffs to enter petitioner's clinic to serve the capiases on the employees, the County Prosecutor was acting as the final decisionmaker for the county, and the county may therefore be held liable under § 1983. Pp. 475 U. S. 484-485."

== Dissent ==
Justice Powell, writing for the dissent, stated that the Court's holding "is wrong for at least two reasons. First, the Prosecutor's response and the Deputies' subsequent actions did not violate any constitutional right that existed at the time of the forcible entry. Second, no official county policy could have been created solely by an off-hand telephone response from a busy County Prosecutor."

== See also ==
- Monell v. Department of Social Services of the City of New York (1978)
- List of United States Supreme Court cases, volume 475
