= Wilkinson v. United States =

- Supreme Court of the United States

Argued November 17, 1960 Decided February 27, 1961
- Full case name: Frank Wilkinson v. United States
- Citations: 365 U.S. 399 (more) 81 S. Ct. 567; 5 L. Ed. 2d 633

Court membership
- Chief Justice Earl Warren Associate Justices Hugo Black · Felix Frankfurter; William O. Douglas · Tom C. Clark; John M. Harlan II · William J. Brennan Jr. Charles E. Whittaker · Potter Stewart

Case opinions
- Majority: Stewart, joined by Frankfurter, Clark, Harlan, Whittaker
- Dissent: Black, joined by Warren, Douglas
- Dissent: Douglas, joined by Warren, Black
- Dissent: Brennan, joined by Douglas

Laws applied
- 2 U.S.C. § 192

Wilkinson v. United States, 365 U.S. 399 (1961), was a court case during the McCarthy Era in which the petitioner, Frank Wilkinson, an administrator with the Housing Authority of the City of Los Angeles, challenged his conviction under 2 U.S.C. § 192, which makes it a misdemeanor to refuse to answer any question pertinent to the question under inquiry for any person summoned as a witness by Congress. The petitioner's conviction was sustained in a 5–4 ruling, upholding a prior ruling in Barenblatt v. United States.

The petitioner was indeed summoned to testify before a Subcommittee of the House of Representatives' Un-American Activities Committee, which was investigating alleged Communist infiltration into basic industries and Communist Party propaganda activities. The petitioner refused to answer a question as to whether he was a member of the Communist Party, contending that the Subcommittee lacked legal authority to interrogate him and that its questioning violated his First Amendment rights. He was convicted of a misdemeanor violation of 2 U.S.C. § 192. The Court also, on February 27, 1961, denied Braden v. United States, a companion case appealing a similar 2 U.S.C. § 192 conviction.

The underlying activities of the FBI and government agencies later resulted in a case, Wilkinson v. FBI, in which it was revealed that the FBI believed the witness that provided the assertion of Wilkinson's association with the Communist Party was "unreliable and emotionally unstable."
