= Monell v. Department of Social Services of the City of New York =

- Supreme Court of the United States

Argued November 2, 1977 Decided June 6, 1978
- Full case name: Jane Monell et al., Petitioners, v. Department of Social Services of the City of New York et al.
- Citations: 436 U.S. 658 (more) 98 S. Ct. 2018; 56 L. Ed. 2d 611

Case history
- Prior: 394 F. Supp. 853 (S.D.N.Y. 1976), affirmed, 532 F.2d 259 (2d Cir. 1976); cert. granted, 429 U.S. 1071 (1977).

Holding
- Municipalities can be held liable for violations of Constitutional rights through 42 U.S.C. § 1983 actions.

Court membership
- Chief Justice Warren E. Burger Associate Justices William J. Brennan Jr. · Potter Stewart; Byron White · Thurgood Marshall; Harry Blackmun · Lewis F. Powell Jr. William Rehnquist · John P. Stevens

Case opinions
- Majority: Brennan, joined by Stewart, White, Marshall, Blackmun, and Powell.
- Concurrence: Powell
- Concurrence: Stevens
- Dissent: Rehnquist, joined by Burger

Laws applied
- U.S. Const. amend. XIV, Civil Rights Act of 1871 § 1
- This case overturned a previous ruling or rulings
- Monroe v. Pape, 365 U.S. 167 (1961) (in part)

Monell v. Department of Social Services, 436 U.S. 658 (1978), is an opinion given by the United States Supreme Court in which the Court overruled Monroe v. Pape by holding that a local government is a "person" subject to suit under Section 1983 of Title 42 of the United States Code: Civil action for deprivation of rights. Additionally, the Court held that §1983 claims against municipal entities must be based on implementation of a policy or custom.

== Background ==
The case began in July 1971 as a challenge to the New York City Board of Education's forced maternity leave policies. Monell was a part of a class of women employees of the Dept. of Social Services and Board of Education of the city of New York who were compelled to take maternity leave before such leaves were required for medical reasons. The women sued the Dept. and its Commissioner, the Board and its Chancellor, and the city of New York and its Mayor. The District Court found that petitioners' constitutional rights had been violated, but ruled that petitioners' claims for injunctive relief were mooted by a supervening change in the official maternity leave policy, and that under Monroe v. Pape, petitioners were barred recovering back pay from the city. The Court of Appeals for the Second Circuit affirmed. The Supreme Court of the United States granted certiorari to consider whether local governmental officials and/or local independent school boards are "persons" within the meaning of § 1983 when equitable relief in the nature of back pay is sought against them in their official capacities.

== Analysis ==
First, the Court undertook a fresh review of the legislative history of the Civil Rights Act of 1871, now codified as 42 U.S.C. §1983 that Monroe v. Pape relied upon in holding that municipal entities were not "persons" subject to §1983. The Court examined the vote on Section 1 of § 1983, (2) the Sherman Amendment and its vote, (3) the text and vote on the first conference report, and (4) the text and vote on the second conference report. The Court found that Congress did intend for municipal entities to be included among those "persons" to whom § 1983 applies, and that Congress at this time would not have thought the statute unconstitutional as applied to local governments. The Court wrote that the Monroe Court misinterpreted the meaning of §1983, and that were §1983 unconstitutional as applied to municipal entities, it would also be unconstitutional as applied to municipal officers. The Court noted that 1871 Congress clearly intended §1983 to apply to such officers and agreed that they could be subject to liability under §1983, and that the Act was also clearly intended to provide a remedy against all forms of official violation of constitutional rights.

Second, in overruling Monroe v. Pape, the Court considered that Monroe departed from prior practice insofar as to completely immunize municipal entities from liability under §1983. Reasoning that there was no principled distinction between school boards and other municipal entities, the Court found that its many cases, which held school boards liable, were inconsistent with Monroe, and were a further indication that Monroe should be overruled. The Court wrote that immunizing school boards against liability under §1983 would be contrary to instances where Congress refused to immunize school boards from federal jurisdiction under §1983, and that municipalities could not have arranged their affairs so as to be able to violate constitutional rights indefinitely, and therefore could not have a reliance interest in absolute immunity.

Third, the Court, in analyzing the legislative history, found that Congress did not intend for a municipality to by held liable under §1983 solely because it employed a tortfeasor, and that therefore a local government could not be held liable under respondeat superior.

The court reasoned that since there was no clear statement in the legislative history justifying the excluding municipalities as "persons" under §1983, such entities could be sued directly under §1983 for policies or customs that violated the U.S. Constitution.

== Holding ==
The United States Supreme Court held that a local government is a "person" that can be sued under §1983: civil action for deprivation of rights. The Court, however, required that a §1983 claim against a municipal entity be based on the implementation or execution of a "a policy statement, ordinance, regulation, or decision officially adopted and promulgated by that party's officers". Additionally, the Court held that municipal entities "may be sued for constitutional deprivations visited pursuant to governmental 'custom' even though such a custom has not received formal approval through the body's official decisionmaking channels". Local governments may not, however, be sued under 1983 for an injury solely by its employees or agents–in other words, a municipality cannot be held liable under §1983 on a respondeat superior theory. Justice Brennan drafted the majority opinion.

== Concurrence ==
Justice Powell was prompted to write by "the gravity of overruling part of so important a decision". Powell noted that the considerations of stare decisis operated in both directions in this case, and that this case was different than the usual case where the Court is asked to overrule a precedent, reasoning that on the one hand, there are cases ruling that municipal entities are not "persons" under the statute, but on the other hand cases holding school boards liable. Powell also wrote that there were still substantial line-drawing issues regarding what constitutes a policy or custom.

== Dissent ==
Justice Rehnquist dissented, arguing that adequate justification for overruling Monroe's interpretation of §1983's legislative history did not exist. Noting that Congress did not amend §1983 after Monroe, Rehnquist wrote that the Court should not overrule the earlier decision unless it was beyond a reasonable doubt that the Monroe Court made a mistake, and that at most the evidence of said mistake in earlier interpretation of the legislative history was unclear.

== Arguments made by the parties ==
In her brief for certiorari, Monell argued that (1) a school board is a "person" within the meaning of §1983; (2) an official withholding wages in violation of the constitution can be compelled to provide back pay under §1983; (3) a district court can award monetary relief in a §1983 action for injury sustained between filing the complaint and the granting of final injunctive relief. In the reply brief, Petitioners argued that (1) the existence of immunity based on the good faith of the policy at issue was not before the Court; and (2) that relief was authorized against the Board of Education.

Amici for the Petitioners included the National Education Association and the Lawyers' Committee for Civil Rights.

In its brief against certiorari, the City argued that both stare decisis and legislative history supported upholding Monell. Further, the City argued that the School Board should be treated as another other municipal entity for the purposes of §1983 liability, and therefore damages against any municipal entity should not be permitted. In its reply brief against certiorari, the City argued that retroactive application of Title VII to allow damages would "operate unjustly" and that their maternity leave policies were "adopted with the most laudatory motives" to "protect women employees and their unborn children", no matter "how unreasonable or arbitrary they might seem by today's rapidly evolving standards". Regarding the issue of §1983 liability, the City noted that it approved of the analysis in the Court of Appeals decision, and that "[a]ny other result than that reached here on these issues would render virtually meaningless this Court's decision in Monroe v. Pape."

== Significance ==
This resolution created a precedent that for the first time established local government monetary accountability for unconstitutional acts and created the right to obtain damages from municipalities in such cases. This accountability is a legal doctrine known as Monell liability that has been further developed by subsequent case law.

== Subsequent case law ==
The Court's holding means that liability for an individual defendant sued under §1983, who can be liable for any constitutional violation (absent immunities), even if the conduct is unauthorized or a one-off incident, is distinct from liability for municipal entities, who can be sued under §1983 only pursuant to a policy or custom. This can mean either an affirmative policy or custom or a policy by omission. In subsequent cases, the Court defined what constituted a policy or custom for purposes of Monell liability.

In Pembaur v. City of Cincinnati, the Court held that a single decision made by municipal policy maker can establish policy sufficient for Monell liability. In determining who is a municipal policy maker in City of St. Louis v. Praprotnik (1988), the Court held that officials with final policy-making authority and responsibilities under state law for making policy in that area of city's business, are municipal policy-makers.

Regarding policies of omission, the Court held in City of Canton v. Harris that a municipality can be liable for a failure to train its employees when this failure constitutes a deliberate indifference to the person whose rights were violated. The same standard of deliberate indifference applies to failure to screen employees. In Board of Commissioners of Bryan County v. Brown, the Court held that a municipality can be liable for failure to screen if it is deliberately indifferent to the fact that the people the municipality was hiring were the kind of people with who would predictably commit this type of constitutional violation.

== Aftermath ==
Following the Supreme Court decision holding that municipalities were liable under §1983, the city settled for $375,500, divided among all women employees placed on forced maternity leave from July 1968 to the time of the case being filed. The city increased the money available for compensations to $11 million after an unexpectedly large response from women to notices announcing the settlement. The claims were paid in late 1981.

=== Other U.S. Supreme Court cases analyzing Monell ===
- Connick v. Thompson, 563 U.S. 51 (2011)
- L.A. County v. Humphries, 562 U.S. 29 (2010)
- McMillian v. Monroe County, 520 U.S. 781 (1997)
- Jett v. Dallas Indep. Sch. Dist., 491 U.S. 701 (1989)
- Will v. Michigan Dep't of State Police, 491 U.S. 58 (1989)
- Springfield v. Kibbe, 480 U.S. 257 (1987)
- Oklahoma City v. Tuttle, 471 U.S. 808 (1985)
- Brandon v. Holt, 469 U.S. 464 (1985)
- Newport v. Fact Concerts, Inc., 453 U.S. 247 (1981)
- Owen v. Independence, 445 U.S. 622 (1980)
- Quern v. Jordan, 440 U.S. 332 (1979)
- Hutto v. Finney, 437 U.S. 678 (1978)

== Scholarship discussing Monell ==
=== Treatises ===
- Rodney A. Smolla, Deprivation of Rights Under Color of Law: § 1983, Bivens Actions, and Related Issues
- Erwin Chemerinsky, Federal Jurisduction (7th edition 2016)
- Stuart M. Speiser, Charles F. Krause, Alfred W. Gans, Monique C. M. Leahy Contributing Editor, American Law of Torts, Strict Liability in Tort and Related Remedies; Intentional Torts

=== Law Review articles ===
- David Achtenberg, Taking History Seriously: Municipal Liability Under 42 U.S.C. § 1983 and the Debate Over Respondeat Superior, 73 Fordham L. Rev. 2183 (2005)
- Susan Bandes, Introduction: The Emperor's New Clothes, 48 DePaul L. Rev. 619 (1999)
- Susan Bandes, Monell, Parratt, Daniels, and Davidson: Distinguishing a Custom or Policy from a Random, Unauthorized Act, 72 Iowa L. Rev. 101 (1986)
- Jack Beermann, Municipal Responsibility for Constitutional Torts, 48 DePaul L. Rev. 627 (1999)
- Karen Blum, Municipal Liability, 48 DePaul L. Rev. 687 (1999)
- George Brown, Municipal Liability under § 1983 and the Ambiguities of Burger Court Federalism, 27 B.C.L.Rev. 883 (1986)
- Mark Brown, The Failure of Fault Under § 1983: Municipal Liability for State Law Enforcement, 84 Cornell L. Rev. 1503 (1999)
- Mark Brown, Correlating Municipal Liability and Official Immunity Under § 1983, 1989 U.Ill.L.Rev. 625 (1989)
- Mark Brown, Accountability in Government and § 1983, 25 U.Mich.J.L. Ref. 53 (1991)
- Oscar Chase & Arlo Monell, Monell: The Story Behind the Landmark, 31 Urb. Law. 491 (1999)
- Douglas Colbert, Bifurcation of Civil Rights Defendants: Undermining Monellin Police Brutality Cases, 44 Hastings L.J. 499 (1993)
- Steven Cushman, Municipal Liability under § 1983: Toward a New Definition of Municipal Policymaker, 34 B.C.L. Rev. 693 (1993)
- Richard Frankel, Regulating Privatized Government Through § 1983, U.Chi.L. Rev. (2009)
- Michael Gerhardt, Institutional Analysis of Municipal Liability Under § 1983, 48 DePaul L. Rev. 669 (1999)
- Michael Gerhardt, The Monell Legacy: Balancing Federalism Concerns and Municipal Accountability under § 1983, 62 S.Cal.L. Rev. 539 (1989)
- Myriam Gilles, Breaking the Code of Silence. Rediscovering "Custom" in § 1983 Municipal Liability, 80 B.U.L. Rev. 17 (2000)
- David Hamilton, The Importance and Overuse of Policy and Custom Claims: A View from One Trench, 48 DePaul L. Rev. 723 (1999)
- Eric Harrington, Judicial Misuse of History and § 1983: Toward a Purpose-Based Approach, 85 Tex. L. Rev. 999 (2007)
- Robert Kaczorowski, Reflection on Monell's Analysis of the Legislative History of § 1983, 31 Urb. Law. 407 (1999)
- Kit Kinports, The Buck Does Not Stop Here: Supervisory Liability in § 1983 Cases, 1997 U. Ill. L. Rev. 147 (1997)
- Barbara Kritchevsky, Civil Rights Liability of Private Entities, 26 Cardozo L. Rev. 81 (2004)
- Barbara Kritchevsky, Making Sense of State of Mind: Determining Responsibility in § 1983 Municipal Liability Litigation, 60 G.W. L. Rev. 417 (1992)
- Barbara Kritchevsky, Reexamining Monell: Basing § 1983 Municipal Liability Doctrine on the Statutory Language, 31 Urb. Law. 437 (1999)
- Ronald Levin, The § 1983 Municipal Immunity Doctrine, 65 Geo. L. J. 1483 (1977)
- Harold Lewis & Theodore Blumhoff, Reshaping § 1983's Asymetry, 140 Pa. L. Rev. 755 (1982)
- Robert Manley, Effective But Messy, Monell Should Endure, 31 Urb. Law. 481 (1999)
- Susanah Mead, 42 U.S.C. § 1983 Municipal Liability: The Monell Sketch Becomes a Distorted Picture, 65 N.C.L. Rev. 518 (1987)
- Solomon Oliver, Municipal Liability for Police Misconduct under 42 U.S.C. § 1983 after City of Oklahoma City v. Tuttle, 64 Wash.U.L.Q. 151 (1986)
- Laura Oren, If Monell Were Reconsidered: Sexual Abuse and the Scope-of-Employment Doctrine in the Common Law, 31 Urb. Law. 527 (1999)
- Eric Schnapper, Civil Rights Litigation After Monell, 79 Colum. L. Rev 213 (1979)
- Barbara Rook, The Final Authority Analysis: A Unified Approach to Municipal Liability under § 1983, 1986 Wis.L.Rev. 633 (1986)
- G. Flint Taylor, A Litigatior's View of Discovery and Proof in Police Misconduct Policy and Practice Cases, 48 DePaul L. Rev. 747 (1999)
- Ronald Turner, Employer Liability for Supervisory Hostile Environment Sexual Harassment: Comparing Title VII's and § 1983's Regulatory Regimes, 31 Urb Law. 503 (1999)
- Christina B. Whitman, Government Responsibility for Constitutional Torts, 85 Mich.L. Rev. 225 (1986)
