= Barenblatt v. United States =

Lloyd Barenblatt v. United States
- Supreme Court of the United States

Argued November 18, 1958 Decided June 8, 1959
- Full case name: Lloyd Barenblatt v. United States
- Citations: 360 U.S. 109 (more) 79 S. Ct. 1081; 3 L. Ed. 2d 1115

Holding
- Barenblatt's charge for contempt of Congress is upheld: the committee provided a proper link between the investigation and a legitimate legislative activity

Court membership
- Chief Justice Earl Warren Associate Justices Hugo Black · Felix Frankfurter; William O. Douglas · Tom C. Clark; John M. Harlan II · William J. Brennan Jr. Charles E. Whittaker · Potter Stewart

Case opinions
- Majority: Harlan, joined by Frankfurter, Clark, Whittaker, & Stewart
- Dissent: Black, joined by Warren & Douglas
- Dissent: Brennan

Barenblatt v. United States, 360 U.S. 109 (1959), was a case in which the Supreme Court of the United States ruled that the actions of the House Un-American Activities Committee did not violate the First Amendment and, thus, the Court upheld Lloyd Barenblatt's conviction for contempt of Congress. The Court held that the congressional committee had authority to compel a college professor to answer questions about his Communist Party membership.

== Background ==
On February 25, 1953, the House Committee on Un-American Activities began a series of investigations to determine "the character, extent and objects of Communist Party activities … carried on by [teachers] who are subject to the directives and discipline of the Communist Party." Francis Crowley was brought before the committee and testified that while he was a graduate student at the University of Michigan in 1950, he and Lloyd Barenblatt – with whom he had shared an apartment – had participated in a student club with ties to the Communist Party. Lloyd Barenblatt was subpoenaed in June 1954. Since his time as a teaching fellow at the University of Michigan, Barenblatt had been a social psychology instructor at Vassar. When he was subpoenaed to testify before the House Committee on Un-American Activities, the college refused to renew his contract.

Although Barenblatt admitted that he had been at Michigan at the time and knew Crowley he refused to answer the following five questions:

1. Are you now a member of the Communist Party?
2. Have you ever been a member of the Communist Party?
3. Did you know Francis Crowley to be a member of the Communist Party?
4. Were you ever involved with a student organization affiliated with the Communist Party while at the University of Michigan?
5. Were you a member while a student of the University of Michigan Council of Arts, Sciences, and Professions?

Barenblatt objected to these questions on the basis that they concerned his personal and private political and religious beliefs, as well as his associative activities. He did not invoke the 5th Amendment's protection against self-incrimination. He argued that the committee was not authorized to compel testimony, he was given insufficient information about his testimony's relevance to the committee's legislative tasks, and his objections were protected by the First Amendment.

The House of Representatives held him in contempt of Congress to refusing to answer these questions, and a U.S. attorney obtained conviction against him. On appeal to the Supreme Court, Barenblatt was represented by the American Civil Liberties Union.

== Decision of the Court ==
The Court, in a 5–4 decision, held that HUAC did not violate Barenblatt's First Amendment rights. Justice Harlan's opinion stated that "Where First Amendment rights are asserted to bar governmental interrogation, resolution of the issue involves a balancing of the competing private and public interests." Harlan then struck a balance in favor of the government: "That Congress has wide power to legislate in the field of Communist activity in this Country, and to conduct appropriate investigations in aid thereof, is hardly debatable. This power rests on the right of self-preservation, the ultimate value of any society." This governmental interest was found to outweigh Professor Barenblatt's First Amendment interest in studying, discussing, and associating with those interested in the theories of Communism. Professor Barenblatt claimed he never sought to overthrow the government through his discussions of Communism. Nevertheless, the Court deferred to Congress's power to investigate for legislative purposes.

=== Dissenting opinions ===
Two dissenting opinions were presented. Justice Hugo Black's dissent was concurred with by Chief Justice Earl Warren and Justice William O. Douglas. Black dissented on these grounds: First, that the term "Un-American" in the committee's mission was so vague as to make the committee's mandate void under the due process clause of the Fifth Amendment. Second, the Court's "balancing test" as to the applicability of First Amendment rights was not the way to determine the scope of freedom of speech, and if it were, the Court should have balanced the interest of society in "being able to join organizations, advocate causes and make political 'mistakes'" against the government's limited interest in making laws in the area of free speech..." Third, "the chief aim, purpose, and practice of the HUAC... is to try witnesses and punish them because they are or have been Communists or because they refuse or admit or deny Communist affiliations."

Justice William J. Brennan, also dissenting, wrote, "...no purpose for the investigation of Barenblatt is revealed by the record except exposure purely for the sake of exposure. This is not the purpose to which Barenblatt's rights under the First Amendment can validly be subordinated. An investigation in which the processes of law-making and law-evaluating are submerged entirely in exposure of individual behavior-in adjudication, of a sort, through the exposure process-is outside the constitutional pale of congressional inquiry."

Justice Black rejected the Court's balancing test: "I do not agree that laws directly abridging First Amendment freedoms can be justified by a balancing process... [The balancing test] completely leaves out the real interest in Barenblatt's silence, the interest of the people as a whole in being able to join organizations, advocate causes and make political 'mistakes' without later being subjected to governmental penalties for having dared to think for themselves."

== See also ==
- Wilkinson v. United States
- House Un-American Activities Committee
- Watkins v. United States
