= Times Film Corp. v. City of Chicago =

Times Film Corp. v. City of Chicago, or Times v. City of Chicago is the name of two cases decided by the U.S. Supreme Court in 1957 and 1961. Both involved the issue of limits on freedom of expression in connection with motion pictures. In both cases the court affirmed the right of local governments to engage in some form of censorship.

Within a few years after the second decision, however, the court had dramatically reversed itself, coming down in favor of broad First Amendment freedoms for filmmakers.

== 1957 case ==
Times Film Corp. v. City of Chicago
- Supreme Court of the United States

Decided November 12, 1957
- Full case name: Times Film Corporation v. City of Chicago, Richard J. Daley and Timothy J. O'Connor
- Citations: 355 U.S. 35 (more) 78 S. Ct. 115; 2 L. Ed. 2d 72

Case history
- Prior: 139 F. Supp. 837 (N.D. Ill. 1956); 244 F.2d 432 (7th Cir. 1957).

Holding
- Petition for writ of certiorari granted and judgment of the United States Court of Appeals for the Seventh Circuit reversed.

Court membership
- Chief Justice Earl Warren Associate Justices Hugo Black · Felix Frankfurter; William O. Douglas · Harold H. Burton; Tom C. Clark · John M. Harlan II; William J. Brennan Jr. · Charles E. Whittaker

Case opinion
- Per curiam

The first case, 355 U.S. 35 (1957), was decided on November 12, 1957.

A Chicago ordinance required that before being permitted to screen any film in the city, exhibitors submit the film to the police commissioner's office and pay a license fee. The license to show the film could be denied if the film did not meet certain standards; this denial could be appealed to the mayor, whose decision would be final.

The petitioner wished to exhibit Le blé en herbe (The Game of Love), a French film directed by Claude Autant-Lara and based on a novel by Colette. The film depicted a sexual relationship between an adult woman and a teenage boy.

On May 6, 1955, the petitioner applied for an exhibition permit. On June 2, 1955, the police commissioner denied the permit because the film was indecent. On June 6, the petitioner appealed the decision to the mayor, Richard J. Daley. On June 20, the appeal was denied.

The petitioner then sued the city in the U.S. District Court for the Northern District of Illinois, choosing a federal court because of diversity of citizenship and because the petitioner was alleging infringement by municipal authorities of the petitioner's rights under the First Amendment and Fourteenth Amendment to the United States Constitution. A report by a master in chancery found that the film's sexual content did not violate any law, citing ACLU v. Chicago; that state interests did not justify an ordinance authorizing prior restraint on freedom of expression; and that the Chicago ordinance was vague and thus unconstitutional. The master did allow for a prohibition against persons under eighteen years of age viewing the film.

After the defendants objected to the Master's Report, the District Court issued its ruling on March 21, 1956, sustained their objections, calling the film prurient and stating that the First Amendment still allows local authorities to censor films deemed obscene, noting that the right to free speech under the First Amendment is "not absolute and unlimited.” The court cited Near v. Minnesota; Chaplinsky v. New Hampshire; and Joseph Burstyn, Inc. v. Wilson. The court also asserted that the terms "immoral" or "obscene" were not too vague to merit the ordinance unconstitutional.

The U.S. Court of Appeals for the Seventh Circuit affirmed the District Court's decision, maintaining that the film's main purpose and effect was “to arouse sexual desires” much more than any other artistic purpose. The U.S. Supreme Court, in a decision announced on November 12, 1957, agreed. The Court issued a one-sentence per curiam opinion, granting the petition for a writ of certiorari and summarily reversing the judgment of the Seventh Circuit. The decision simply cited an earlier 1957 case, Alberts v. California, in which a 6–3 majority, in a decision written by Justice Brennan, had held that obscenity was “not within the area of constitutionally protected speech or press” and that the First Amendment was not intended to protect materials that were “utterly without redeeming social importance.”

== 1961 case ==
Times Film Corp. v. City of Chicago
- Supreme Court of the United States

Argued October 19–20, 1960 Decided January 23, 1961
- Full case name: Times Film Corporation v. City of Chicago, et al.
- Citations: 365 U.S. 43 (more) 81 S. Ct. 391; 5 L. Ed. 2d 403

Case history
- Prior: 180 F. Supp. 843 (N.D. Ill. 1959), aff'd, 272 F.2d 90 (7th Cir. 1960)

Holding
- The First Amendment does not afford absolute privilege against prior restraint of speech, and "although motion pictures are included within the free speech and free press guaranties of the First and Fourteenth Amendments, there is no absolute freedom to exhibit publicly, at least once, every kind of motion picture."

Court membership
- Chief Justice Earl Warren Associate Justices Hugo Black · Felix Frankfurter; William O. Douglas · Tom C. Clark; John M. Harlan II · William J. Brennan Jr. Charles E. Whittaker · Potter Stewart

Case opinions
- Majority: Clark, joined by Stewart, Whittaker, Harlan, and Frankfurter
- Dissent: Warren, joined by Black, Douglas, and Brennan

=== Background and procedural history ===
In Times Film Corp. v. City of Chicago, 365 U.S. 43, Times Film Corp. once again wanted to show a film in Chicago but was denied a permit. This time the film was entitled Don Juan. The petitioner paid the license fee but refused to submit the film for examination. When the permit was refused, the corporation sued the city in federal court, arguing that the ordinance violated the First and Fourteenth Amendments.

The U.S. District Court of Northern Illinois dismissed the suit, stating that it presented no justiciable controversy; the Court of Appeals for the Seventh Circuit agreed, concluding that since neither the film nor evidence of its content had been presented, the case merely presented an abstract question of law.

The United States Supreme Court, however, agreed to adjudicate the case, in which the Times Film Corp. was represented by the ACLU. The Court heard the case on October 19, 1960, and issued its ruling on January 23, 1961. It found against Times Film Corp. on the grounds that it was not challenging the validity of the censor's standards but was challenging the censor's very right to censor.

=== Opinion of the Court ===
The Court ruled, 5–4, that “there is not a word in the record as to the nature and content of 'Don Juan'” and that “[t]he challenge here is to the censor's basic authority.” Citing Gitlow v. New York, the court stated, “It has never been held that liberty of speech is absolute. Nor has it been suggested that all previous restraints on speech are invalid.” The court rejected the petitioner's argument against prior restraint, maintaining that it was not the Court's job “to limit the State in its selection of the remedy it deems most effective to cope” with the problem of obscenity in films.

The majority opinion was written by Justice Clark, with Justices Frankfurter, Harlan, Whittaker, and Stewart joining in the majority opinion.

=== Dissenting opinions ===
Both Justices Warren and Douglas wrote dissenting opinions; they were joined by Justices Black and Brennan.

==== Warren's dissent ====
Chief Justice Warren's long and probing dissent, in which Justices Black, Douglas, and Brennan joined, argued that the court's decision “presents a real danger of eventual censorship for every form of communication, be it newspapers, journals, books, magazines, television, radio or public speeches. The Court purports to leave these questions for another day, but I am aware of no constitutional principle which permits us to hold that the communication of ideas through one medium may be censored while other media are immune.”

Citing such precedents as Near v. Minnesota and Grosjean v. American Press Co., as well as Cantwell v. Connecticut, in which the court found previous restraint unconstitutional, Chief Justice Warren emphasized that the question presented in the case was not whether an exhibitor has a “complete and absolute freedom to exhibit at least once, any and every kind of motion picture.” Rather, the question was whether government at any level can “require all motion picture exhibitors to submit all films...for licensing and censorship prior to public exhibition within the jurisdiction.”

Protesting that the court's decision “gives formal sanction to censorship in its purest and most far-reaching form,” Chief Justice Warren compared the Chicago censorship procedure to the “English licensing laws of the seventeenth century which were commonly used to suppress dissent.” Recounting several dozen recent examples of egregious censorship in the U.S., including a Chicago ban on Charlie Chaplin's The Great Dictator, which the city deemed offensive to German-Americans, he referred to “the evils of the censor's basic authority, of the mischief of the system against which so many great men have waged stubborn and often precarious warfare for centuries.”

==== Douglas dissent ====
Justice Douglas, in a briefer dissent with which Justices Warren and Black concurred, wrote that “censorship of movies is unconstitutional because it is a prior restraint and violative of the First Amendment.” Citing statements about censorship from Plato's Republic and Hobbes's Leviathan, he noted: “Regimes of censorship are common in the world today. Every dictator has one; every Communist regime finds it indispensable.” While censors had once been concerned with political satire, they were now preoccupied “with atheism and with sexual morality,” with a variety of groups seeking to “translate into secular law their notions of morality.”

Yet in the U.S., Justice Douglas pronounced, “the state is not the secular arm of any religious school of thought, nor is the church an instrument of the state.” The First Amendment forbids the government from supporting any censor: “It is not for government to pick and choose according to the standards of any religious, political, or philosophical group. It is not permissible, as I read the Constitution, for government to release one movie and refuse to release another because of an official's concept of the prevailing need or the public good.”

Justice Douglas further warned of “the ease with which the censor can erode liberty of expression.” The point of the First Amendment is “to enlarge, not to limit, freedom in literature and in the arts as well as in politics, economics, law, and other fields....No more potent force in defeat of that freedom could be designed than censorship. It is a weapon that no minority or majority group, acting through government, should be allowed to wield over any of us.”

=== Legacy ===
Within a very short time after rendering these two decisions, the U.S. Supreme Court would shift toward a far broader interpretation of the First Amendment. Justice Brennan, who wrote the majority opinion in the 1957 case, would reverse his position on the issue in Miller v. California.

One observer has noted that Chief Justice Warren foresaw the mistake the court was making in the 1961 case. The Court would hear several related cases over the next five years, and by 1965 reversed its decision on censorship, ruling states and municipalities can not necessarily censor films under the First and Fourteenth Amendments.
