= Defending Rights & Dissent =

American non-profit organization

- Formation: 1960
- Merger of: Bill of Rights Defense Committee, Defending Dissent Foundation
- Legal status: 501(c)(3)
- Headquarters: Washington, DC
- Website: www.rightsanddissent.org
- Formerly called: National Committee to Abolish the House Un-American Activities Committee; National Committee Against Repressive Legislation

Defending Rights & Dissent (DRAD) is a national not-for-profit advocacy organization in the United States, dedicated to defending civil liberties, exposing government repression, and protecting the right of political dissent. DRAD was formed as the merger of the Defending Dissent Foundation (DDF) and the Bill of Rights Defense Committee (BORDC). DRAD is currently active in defending the right to protest, opposing political surveillance, and campaigning against the prosecution of national security whistleblowers.

== History ==
=== NCA-HUAC ===
In 1960, the National Committee to Abolish the House Un-American Activities Committee (NCA-HUAC) formed as a group opposing the House Un-American Activities Committee (HUAC). Frank Wilkinson founded NCA-HUAC after he came under HUAC suspicion. In his capacity working for the Los Angeles City Housing Authority on a public housing project, Wilkinson was asked by opposing lawyer Felix McGinnis to disclose which organizations he had previously been associated with. This was a thinly veiled attempt to determine whether Wilkinson belonged to the Communist Party of the United States of America (CPUSA) or one of CPUSA’s many front groups. When subpoenaed by the House Un-American Activities Committee, Wilkinson again refused to answer questions regarding his organizational involvement "as a matter of conscience and personal responsibility." Wilkinson was cited for contempt of Congress and consequently sent to jail, where he served a year-long sentence.

NCA-HUAC, under Wilkinson’s leadership, began its advocacy against McCarthyism in 1960. The organization was an outgrowth of the Southern California Civil Liberties Union (a unit of the American Civil Liberties Union) and the Citizens Committee to Preserve American Freedoms. Unlike other civil liberties organizations, NCA-HUAC retained a single-minded focus on opposing HUAC. As an organizing tactic, NCA-HUAC created networks of local affiliates located across the United States. NCA-HUAC theorized that national groups alone could not turn the tide against HUAC; targeted local lobbying in individual congressional districts would be necessary.

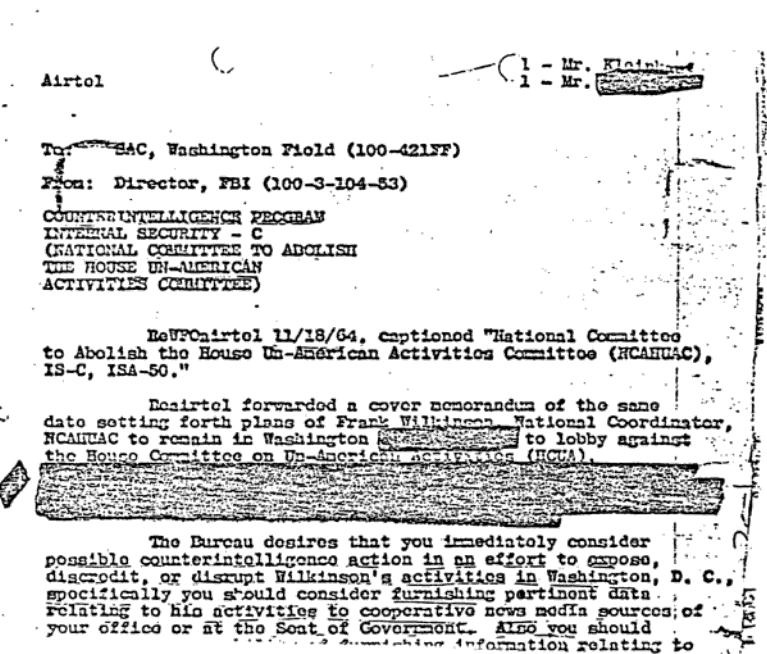
FBI directive to "expose, discredit, or disrupt" Frank Wilkinson's activities on behalf of NCA-HUAC

From the outset, NCA-HUAC was a target of FBI covert action and surveillance. In 1957, HUAC produced a report alleging that activist groups opposed to HUAC had been infiltrated by communists. Assistant FBI Director Fred J. Baumgardner believed that HUAC was a "buffer target” bulwarking the FBI against communist subversion. The FBI believed that communists were engaged in a secret war to destroy HUAC called "Operation Abolition.” Based on this belief, the FBI took steps to surveil and discredit critics of HUAC, including NCA-HUAC. FBI Director J. Edgar Hoover personally ordered an expedited investigation of NCA-HUAC as part of COINTELPRO. An FBI memo included directives to "expose, discredit, or disrupt” NCA-HUAC.

The FBI conducted covert actions (then called "counterintelligence operations”) against NCA-HUAC. The ostensible purpose of investigation and covert action was to decide whether NCA-HUAC should be required to register as a communist front organization under the Internal Security Act of 1950. However, the Department of Justice repeatedly declined the FBI’s request to require NCA-HUAC to register as a communist front organization. Eventually, J. Walter Yeagley at the Department of Justice instructed the FBI to stop submitting reports requesting that NCA-HUAC be required to register.

The FBI routinely forwarded derogatory information about NCA-HUAC to HUAC and their allies. On at least twenty different occasions, the FBI forwarded HUAC material about NCA-HUAC, including information gathered from FBI informants. HUAC then forwarded its supporters dossiers on people connecting to NCA-HUAC, including material intended to be used to prepare for debates against NCA-HUAC members. The FBI obtained pre-publication copies of a pamphlet slated to be released by a member of NCA-HUAC entitled "HUAC: Bulwark of Segregation.” The FBI produced a chapter-by-chapter summary of the unpublished pamphlet to be distributed to field offices.

Not all of the FBI’s information campaign against NCA-HUAC was conducted in-house. A "sizeable number” of records from the FBI Crime Records Division were leaked to media contacts, including reporters at the Los Angeles Examiner and the American Legion publication Firing Line. HUAC submitted press releases based on FBI files to the newswire United Press International.

When Wilkinson embarked on an NCA-HUAC speaking tour, he faced further FBI surveillance and covert action. The FBI ordered field agents to spy on Wilkinson’s speaking engagements, which they secretly photographed and videotaped. At Drake University in 1962, the FBI planted an audience member, who asked Wilkinson whether he was a communist. In another instance, the FBI stationed a "friendly newspaperman” at the entrance to the church where Wilkinson was speaking to ask for audience members’ names and addresses. This was an attempt to dissuade the public from attending the event. The FBI further attempted to interfere with the NCA-HUAC speaking tour by mailing newspaper clippings portraying NCA-HUAC in a negative light to venues planning to host Wilkinson. In several cases, this tactic led to the cancellation of planned speaking engagements. Ahead of Wilkinson’s media appearances, news stations received FBI-drafted questions about Wilkinson’s alleged communist ties. These questions were sometimes posed to Wilksonson on air. The FBI also recruited counterdemonstrators, including members of the American Nazi Party.

In addition to interfering with Wilkinson’s speaking tour, the FBI also interfered with fundraising, creating problems for NCA-HUAC as a donor-dependent nonprofit organization. The FBI called on the Virginia Alcoholic Beverage Control Commission to raid a Democratic Party fundraiser because one of the candidates present was a sponsor of NCAHUAC. In January 1966, the office of the Chicago Committee to Defend the Bill of Rights was broken into. This black bag operation was authorized by FBI Assistant Director William C. Sullivan and undertaken for the purpose of photographing the lists of donors to the organization.

NCA-HUAC also lobbied Congress. Here too, the FBI surveilled the organization and undertook covert actions disparaging the organization. Critics of HUAC in Congress were surveilled, and informants reported back to the FBI which congresspeople attended NCA-HUAC sponsored events. This amounted to an FBI effort to interfere with constitutionally-protected political advocacy.

Information about the extent of FBI interference in the operations of NCA-HUAC came to light when the organization filed Freedom of Information Act (FOIA) requests following an armed break-in in 1969. When the news broke of burglaries associated with the Watergate scandal, members of NCA-HUAC grew suspicious that the break-in at their office was connected to the FBI. On the basis of advice from Watergate prosecutor Archibald Cox, NCA-HUAC asked the FBI about the break-in. The FBI response led Wilkinson to begin filing FOIA requests inquiring about FBI surveillance and covert action against his organization. The FOIA inquiry started a legal battle to retrieve over 132,000 pages of FBI material collected about Wilkinson and NCA-HUAC. The Church Committee investigation later found additional evidence of FBI misconduct in its actions against NCA-HUAC.

=== NCARL ===
NCA-HUAC changed its name to National Committee Against Repressive Legislation (NCARL) in the late 1960s, in order to expand the purview of the organization to include opposition to the criminalization of dissent in criminal code reform, civil liberties abuses in counterterrorism, and mass surveillance. In 1985, a sister non-profit organization, the First Amendment Foundation was created to accept tax deductible donations. The First Amendment Foundation published books and reports by NCARL.

When HUAC was abolished in 1975, Representative Robert F. Drinan commented that:

No account of the demise of the House Un-American Activities Committee would be complete without a notation of the extraordinary work done by the National Committee Against Repressive Legislation.

After HUAC was disbanded, NCARL continued to advocate for the eradication of anti-subversive legislation across the federal government, including through the McCarran-Walter Act, the Seditious Conspiracy statute, and the Smith Act.

Representatives in NCARL testified in front of Congress multiple times in the 1970s and 1980s on issues relating to First Amendment freedoms and whistleblower prosecutions. In 1977, NCARL Washington Coordinator Esther Herst delivered testimony raising concerns that the Foreign Intelligence Surveillance Act (FISA) would endanger the privacy of American citizens.

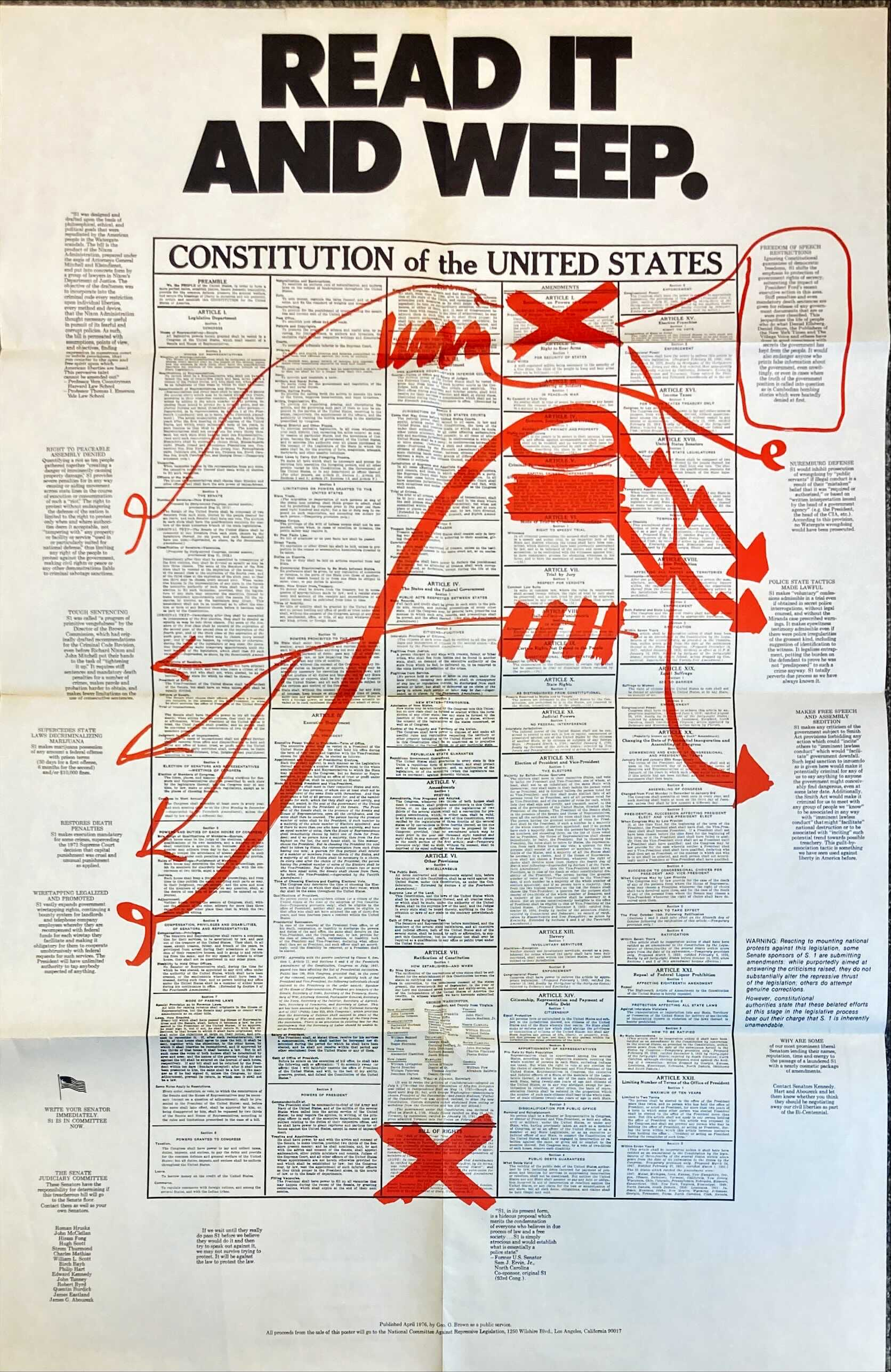
1976 NCARL poster objecting to unconstitutional provisions of SB1, a proposed bill rewriting sections of the federal criminal code

A few years later, Herst testified against provisions of the Criminal Code Reform Act of 1979 that criminalized pre-crime behaviors and endangered dissent that could be construed under the bill as interfering with the processes of government. Herst also testified at other hearings in the same year about dangers to whistleblowers posed by further revisions to the federal criminal code. She raised the concern that certain provisions in the reform bill would allow the New York Times and Washington Post to be prosecuted for publishing the Pentagon Papers.

Paul Hoffman, the vice chairperson of NCARL and the lead attorney in NCARL's lawsuit against the FBI, testified in hearings relating to the Freedom of Information Act (FOIA) that the FBI had improperly administered NCARL's FOIA requests in order to "obscure the true nature and extent of the FBI's counterintelligence actions against NCARL.” NCARL alleged that the FBI acted improperly by defaming and discrediting the organization rather than entering into public debate on the merits of the issues at stake.

In the 1980s and early 1990s, NCARL had program priorities of ending FBI investigations that threatened First Amendment rights and prohibiting CIA covert action. NCARL advocated for statutory control over the FBI to prevent the agency from undertaking investigations that infringed upon First Amendment-protected activity. The NCARL petition, circulated among law school faculty, contributed to the introduction of the FBI First Amendment Act in 1988. Although the bill was not enacted, provisions from the bill were later included as the Edwards Amendment in the 1994 Violent Crime and Law Enforcement Act. It also published a report on CIA covert operations and participated in the CIA Off Campus campaign.

Throughout the 1990s, NCARL and its sister organization, the First Amendment Foundation, worked under the auspices of the National Coalition to Protect Political Freedom (NCPPF) to oppose what they saw as the suspension of due process and revival of McCarthy-era law to profile Muslims and Arab Americans. NCARL also opposed the expansion of FBI authorities under the Antiterrorism and Effective Death Penalty Act of 1996. After 9/11, NCARL continued to oppose the profiling of Muslims, overbroad designations of terrorist organizations, use of secret evidence in trial proceedings, use of torture, and the suspension of the right of habeas corpus for Guantanamo Bay detainees.

=== DDF ===
In 2007, NCARL was folded into its sister organization First Amendment Foundation, which then changed its name again, to the Defending Dissent Foundation. DDF identifies itself as a member of several coalitions of U.S. advocacy groups: Alliance for Justice, Charity and Security Network, Cybersecurity Working Group, D.C. Bill of Rights Committee, Free Expression Network, Liberty Coalition, OpentheGovernment.org, Rights Working Group, and United for Peace and Justice.

=== BORDC ===
The Bill of Rights Defense Committee (BORDC) began in Northampton, MA in the immediate aftermath of the passage of the PATRIOT Act. Attendees at a Women's Congress for Peace gathering concerned with PATRIOT Act attacks on the First Amendment and Fourth Amendment decided to form an advocacy organization opposing the PATRIOT Act on the local level. BORDC conducted local education, hosted debates about federal policy, and advocated for a city council resolution condemning the PATRIOT Act and instructing law enforcement to avoid infringing upon civil liberties. As a result of this activism, the City of Northampton unanimously passed a city council resolution establishing a "civil liberties safe zone.” Following this success, BORDC became a national organization. On the national stage, BORDC coordinated networks of local groups and provided resources for local activism against the PATRIOT Act. By August 2005, 396 local governments had enacted resolutions. By 2007, eight states (Alaska, California, Colorado, Hawaii, Idaho, Maine, Montana, Vermont) and the District of Columbia had passed state-wide resolutions.

According to DRAD, when BORDC became a national organization, it expanded its purview to include advocacy against the expansion of NSA, FBI, CIA, DEA, DHS, and DOJ surveillance authorities. In 2008, BORDC ran the People's Campaign for the Constitution. As part of the campaign, BORDC ran a paid advertisement in the New York Times entitled "A Declaration for Our Times,” which was signed by over six hundred people from across the country. Written in the same format as the Declaration of Independence, the document was designed to draw attention to the Bush administration's secret wiretapping of American citizens, detention of prisoners at Guantanamo Bay, and other policies which, in the view of BORDC, "establish tyranny through false promises of greater security.”

Through the 2010s, BORDC continued its strategy of pushing local governments to pass resolutions limiting cooperation between local law enforcement and federal intelligence agencies. In 2011, BORDC successfully pushed Northampton City Council to unanimously pass a resolution withdrawing local enforcement from cooperation with the Secure Communities program, a controversial information sharing initiative used by federal officers conducting immigration enforcement.

=== DRAD ===
In 2015, the Defending Dissent Foundation merged with the Bill of Rights Defense Committee to form Defending Rights & Dissent (DRAD). DRAD describes their work as encompassing grassroots organizing, watchdog monitoring, coalition work, and legislative advocacy. According to their website, they defend constitutional rights and confront expansions of the national security state.

In recent years, DRAD released a report cataloging FBI surveillance of Black activists, Muslims, protestors at the Republican National Convention, peace activists, Occupy Wall Street protestors, and Abolish ICE protestors. As summarized in The Intercept, the report concluded that the FBI exhibited political bias in its intelligence operations. DRAD criticized the use of sting operations and agents provocateur and recommended changing the standards for opening FBI assessments, a preliminary form of investigation.

DRAD advocates for protections for national security whistleblowers. In particular, DRAD opposes the use of the 1917 Espionage Act to prosecute whistleblowers. The organization has supported bills amending the Espionage Act to better protect journalists and require the government to prove that whistleblowers acted with an intent to harm national security. In 2021, DRAD issued a statement of support for drone whistleblower Daniel Hale. The statement was signed by over fifty journalists and nonprofit organizations.

In 2022, DRAD's foundation partners included the Craigslist Charitable Fund, CS Fund/Warsh-Mott Legacy, Stewart R. Mott Foundation, Victor & Lorraine Honig Fund (Common Counsel Foundation), and Tikva Grassroots Empowerment Fund.

== Leadership ==
=== NCA-HUAC ===
Members of the National Committee to Abolish the House Un-American Activities Committee included:

- Honorary Chairmen: James Imbrie, Alexander Meiklejohn, Clarence Pickett
- Chairman Emeritus: Aubrey Willis Williams
- Chairman: Harvey O'Connor
- Vice Chairman: Dorothy Marshall, Sylvia Crane, Charles Jackson, Harry Bernard, Reverence Edward L. Peat
- Southern Regional Committee: Carl Braden, John Lewis, Reverend C. T. Vivian, Reverence Wyatt T. Walker
- Secretary: Professor Walter S. Vince
- Treasurer: Robert W. Kenny
- Executive Director: Frank Wilkinson

=== DRAD ===
In 2022, DRAD's Board of Directors included:

- President: Sascha Meinrath
- President Emeritus: Woody Kaplan
- Clerk: Suraj K. Sazawal
- Treasurer: Donald Goldhamer
- Vice-Presidents: Emily Berman, Mike Rufo, Fadi Saba
- Members: Shannon Al-Wakeel, Timuel Black, Shahid Buttar, Patrick Eddington, Arun Gupta, Victor S. Navasky, Azadeh Shahshahani

In 2022, DRAD's staff included:

- Sue Udry, Executive Director
- Chip Gibbons, Policy Director
- Cody Bloomfield, Communications Director
- Michael Marmol, Administrative Associate

== Works ==
DRAD created two limited series podcasts: the Still Spying Podcast (2020–2021) and the Primary Sources podcast (2021–2022). According to the Still Spying Podcast website, the series examines "the failure to reform the FBI, the FBI's own war on Black dissent, the FBI's dual role as both law enforcement and intelligence, and how the issue of political surveillance fits into larger discussions about policing." The Primary Sources website describes the purpose of the podcast as "explor[ing] the challenges faced by whistleblowers, journalists, and other truthtellers who expose abuses committed in the name of 'national security'." On Primary Sources, DRAD Policy Director Chip Gibbons interviewed Daniel Ellsberg, James Goodale, Thomas Drake, John Kiriakou, Michael German, Coleen Rowley, Jeffrey Sterling, Lisa Ling, Terry Albury, and Jesselyn Radack, along with several other guests.

In 2019, DRAD released the report Still Spying on Dissent: The Enduring Problem of FBI First Amendment Abuse. The report cataloged FBI targeting of political dissent in its assessments, investigations, and surveillance activities. Previously, DRAD released a joint report with the Center for Constitutional Rights entitled Ag-Gag Across America: Corporate-Backed Attacks on Activists and Whistleblowers, about the criminalization of investigation into the agricultural industry.

DRAD also publishes Dissent NewsWire and a monthly newsletter.
