= Frank Wilkinson =

American civil liberties activist (1914–2006)

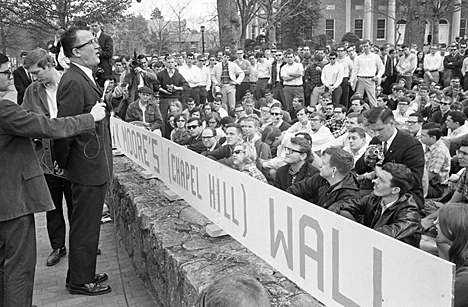
Frank Wilkinson addressing crowd on March 2, 1966, from property within the town of Chapel Hill over the stone wall (property line) of the University of North Carolina at Chapel Hill after the university's refusal to allow Herbert Aptheker and himself to speak to students that invited them to campus.

Frank Wilkinson (August 16, 1914 – January 2, 2006) was an American civil liberties activist who served as executive director of the National Committee Against Repressive Legislation and the First Amendment Foundation (both predecessors to the Defending Dissent Foundation).

== Biography ==
Born in Charlevoix, Michigan, Frank was one of four children. In 1917, Frank's father, Dr. Alan Wilkinson, enlisted in the Army Medical Corps and was stationed in Arizona. Dr. Wilkinson was a devout Methodist. Wilkinson recalled, "every morning of my life we had Bible reading and prayers at the breakfast table. It wasn't just saying grace. We got down on our knees and put our heads on the chairs."

In 1925 the family moved to Hollywood, California and on to Beverly Hills two years later. Although they were not rich, the family was comfortable, and Wilkinson told his biographer "I was not touched by the Depression." He attended Beverly Hills High School.

Wilkinson graduated from the University of California, Los Angeles in 1936.

After graduation, he traveled in the U.S., North Africa and the Middle East. His desire to see Hull House (a settlement house founded by Jane Addams, a pacifist who won the Nobel Peace Prize in 1931) took him to Chicago. While there, he visited Maxwell Street, which he said was "one of the real turning points of my life because I had never seen poverty before." He got another glimpse of poverty when he visited the Bowery in New York City and stayed at a flop house.

He encountered more poverty and degradation in his travels through North Africa and the Middle East. His experiences there caused him to re-evaluate his faith. He wrote to his friend U.C. Berkeley president Robert Gordon Sproul: "Dear Bob, There is no God..." But his commitment to humanity and to building a better world remained, though with a new perspective. He later informed his family of his new-found atheism and zeal for social reform.

The FBI, interested in his transformation, opened a file on him. Notes to the first entry indicated that he had been seen in the company of "known Communists." The FBI continued to monitor Wilkinson's activities for the next four decades.

=== Public housing advocacy ===
By chance, Wilkinson met Msgr. Thomas O'Dwyer, the Archdiocesan Director of Catholic Charities, who introduced him to slums a few scant miles from his home in Beverly Hills, and recruited him to the Citizens Housing Council, and advocacy group for slum clearance and public housing. From this, it was a logical progression to the staff of the Los Angeles Housing Authority.

At the Housing Authority, Wilkinson campaigned for the integration of the first Watts Housing project; he was appointed manager and given the job of implementing the integration he had demanded. As the housing program expanded into a massive $110,000,000 plan for the area, he became the Special Assistant to the executive director. Among his new responsibilities was the task of explaining slum clearance and public housing to the general public. This put him in contact with a multitude of groups, ranging from veterans' organizations and Catholic, Jewish and Protestant hierarchies to the many diverse community and political groups, including the Communist Party.

=== Chavez Ravine ===
Wilkinson was caught up in the McCarthy Era when he defended a major public housing project, Elysian Park Heights, for the Chávez Ravine section of Los Angeles. Many residents of this area had already been displaced due to the impending construction of a new public housing project to be designed by Richard Neutra.

In August, 1952, Wilkinson was assigned by the Housing Authority of the City of Los Angeles to testify as an expert witness in the condemnation proceedings against a group of property owners in the Chavez Ravine, which was a predominantly Hispanic community and impoverished. Wilkinson and the housing authority wanted to turn the area into integrated public housing. He testified at length on the slum-like conditions in the ravine. Felix McGinnis, a lawyer for the landlords, began his cross examination. He had an FBI dossier on Wilkinson and other Housing Authority employees that had been given to him by LA Police Chief William Parker. He asked: "Mr. Wilkinson, will you now tell us of all the organizations, political or otherwise, with which you have associated?" Wilkinson divulged a long list of the groups he had joined: religious, civic, his fraternity. When he stopped, he was asked if that was all. He refused to go on, as a "matter of personal conscience. And if necessary, I would hold that to answer such a question might in some way incriminate me."

The court ruled him disqualified as an expert; his testimony was stricken from the record. The Los Angeles City Council passed a resolution deploring his refusal to answer and calling upon the House Un-American Activities Committee to come to L.A. to investigate the Housing Authority.

The California Senate's "little HUAC" (California Senate Factfinding Subcommittee on Un-American Activities) subpoenaed both Frank and his wife, Jean, a high school social studies teacher, for a closed session. By now it was clear the only purpose was the probe of the political associations of persons related to the Housing Authority. As a matter of personal conscience and social responsibility, both of them refused to answer. They were fired immediately. As the investigation of the Housing Authority continued, the program collapsed, and Chavez Ravine became Dodger Stadium.

=== Campaign against the House Un-American Activities Committee ===
Wilkinson was called before the House Un-American Activities Committee (HUAC) twice, once in 1956 in Los Angeles, and again in 1958 in Atlanta. Both times he chose to plead the First Amendment (rather than the Fifth). In Atlanta he was joined in pleading the First by Carl Braden, a civil rights activist. They both were cited for contempt of Congress, in a vote of 435-0 for Wilkinson and 434-1 for Braden. Their case went to the Supreme Court (see Wilkinson v. United States). In a 5–4 decision, the court upheld Wilkinson's conviction (they refused to hear Braden's case, so the effect was to uphold his conviction as well).

While the case was wending its way through the courts, Wilkinson toured the country speaking out against HUAC and organizing in cities where HUAC held hearings. In 1960, he helped form the National Committee to Abolish HUAC, which evolved into the National Committee Against Repressive Legislation, the organization he led until his death.

On May 1, 1961, Frank Wilkinson and Carl Braden entered federal prison, with each man serving a nine-month sentence.

=== FBI file ===
After his release, Wilkinson continued his campaign to abolish the House Un-American Activities Committee, traveling the country, speaking at campuses and meetings to build opposition to it. During this time he continued to be closely monitored by the FBI.

In 1986, with the help of attorneys from the American Civil Liberties Union, Wilkinson sued for his FBI file. Eventually the FBI was forced to release 132,000 pages of files which included Wilkinson's reports on his speaking engagements and travel, as well as information about an apparent plot to assassinate him.

== Awards ==
Because of his resistance to political repression, Wilkinson received the Roger Baldwin Medal of Liberty; and the American Civil Liberties Union Eason Monroe Courageous Advocate Award, the Earl Warren Civil Liberties Award, and the 1997 National Lawyers’ Guild Legal Worker of the Year.

Wilkinson's story was featured in a special edition of Life (magazine) in 1991, celebrating the bicentennial of the Bill of Rights. (unavailable online)

== In films and music ==
Wilkinson is featured in several films:

- Operation Abolition, a HUAC-produced propaganda film. Wilkinson is interviewed starting at minute 38.
- The Un-Americans, a BBC documentary
- The Price of Freedom, narrated by Ed Asner
- Frank, Jeffry, Benji & Me, a 2006 documentary by his grandson Joshua Wilkinson

and in Ry Cooder's song "Don't Call Me Red".

== General and cited references ==
- Frank Wilkinson, "Revisiting the 'Mccarthy Era': Looking at Wilkinson v. United States in Light of Wilkinson v. Federal Bureau of Investigation", Loyola Law School, Los Angeles, Law Review, v. 32, n.2.Loyola of Los Angeles Law Review | Law Reviews | Loyola Marymount University and Loyola Law School
- PBS: Chavez Ravine. Independent Lens | PBS
- "Frank Wilkinson's Legacy", The Nation
