= Patrick G. Eddington =

American author and policy analyst

Patrick Eddington is an American author, policy analyst in national security and civil liberties at the Cato Institute, who served previously as a CIA military imagery analyst (National Photographic Interpretation Center) from 1988 to 1996.

== Career ==
=== CIA ===
During his tenure at the CIA, his analytical assignments included monitoring the breakup of the former Soviet Union; providing military assessments to policy makers on Iraqi and Iranian conventional forces and coordinating the CIA's military targeting support to NATO during Operation Deliberate Force in Bosnia in 1995.

Eddington resigned in 1996 after working on the book Gassed in the Gulf: The Inside Story of the Pentagon-CIA Cover-up of Gulf War Syndrome, in which he presented the claim of substantial evidence that American soldiers were exposed to chemical agents during the Persian Gulf War in 1991.

=== Lobbyist ===
Eddington has worked as a lobbyist, in Washington.

=== Congressional aide ===
In an op-ed published in The New York Times, in November 2015, Eddington wrote that he worked for Rush Holt, a Congressional Representative for ten years, starting in 2004.

=== Cato Institute ===
Eddington's CIA memoir, Long Strange Journey, was published in 2011. In a 2011 interview with the Washington Post, Eddington accused the CIA of still withholding 1.5 million documents relevant to the Desert Storm malady known as gulf war syndrome.

Eddington is a policy analyst at the Cato Institute.

As of 2020, Eddington serves on the board of Defending Rights & Dissent.

== Writings ==
Eddington's opinion pieces have appeared in numerous of publications, including the Washington Post, Los Angeles Times, Washington Times, Fort Worth Star-Telegram, and the Army Times. Eddington is a frequent commentator on national security issues for the Fox News Channel, MSNBC, SKY News, CNN, and other domestic and international television networks.

- Gassed in the Gulf: The Inside Story of the Pentagon-CIA Cover-Up of Gulf War Syndrome. Insignia Publishing Company. 2000. ISBN 9780595092017.
- Long Strange Journey: An Intelligence Memoir. Wasteland Press. 2011. ISBN 9781600475412.
