= United Farm Equipment and Metal Workers of America =

Labor union

The United Farm Equipment and Metal Workers of America (FE) was a labor union representing workers in two related industries in the United States and Canada.

The union originated as the Farm Equipment Workers' Organizing Committee, which was split off from the Steel Workers' Organizing Committee in 1938. In 1942, it adopted its final name, and was chartered by the Congress of Industrial Organizations (CIO). The CIO claimed that the FE was led by communists, and in 1949, they ordered it to merge into the International Union, United Automobile, Aerospace, and Agricultural Implement Workers of America. However, the union instead merged into the United Electrical, Radio and Machine Workers of America. The merger was completed a few days before the CIO's convention, following which the left-wing unions including the UE resigned or were expelled from the CIO.
