= The Industries of the Future =

2016 book by Alec Ross

- First edition
- Author: Alec Ross
- Published: 2016
- Publisher: Simon & Schuster
- ISBN: 978-1-4767-5365-2

The Industries of the Future is a 2016 nonfiction book by Alec Ross, an American technology policy expert who served as Senior Advisor for Innovation to Secretary of State Hillary Clinton. The book examines technological and economic changes that Ross argues will shape the global economy, focusing on areas including robotics, genomics, cybersecurity, digital currency, coding, and big data. The editors for the book were Jonathan Karp and Jonathan Cox of Simon & Schuster.

== Overview ==
The book explores several industries including robotics, genetics, coding and big data. Ross explores how advances in robotics and life sciences will change the way we live—robots, artificial intelligence and machine learning will have impact on our lives. According to Ross, dramatic advances in life sciences will increase our life expectancy—but not all will benefit from such changes. Ross spends time exploring "Code" and how the codefication of money and also weapons (computer security) will both benefit and potentially disrupt our international economies. Ross also looks at how data will be "the raw material of the information age".

Ross discusses the shift of robotics from being manual and repetitive to cognitive and non-repetitive. He believes that breakthroughs in mathematical modeling and cloud robotics (machine learning and Artificial Intelligence) make robotics acceptable. In the book Ross describes how other cultures have different reactions to robotics and he uses Japan's use of robotics in elder-care as an example. He also expects that less developed countries may be able to leapfrog technologies in robotics much like they did with cell and mobile technologies.

Ross also examines how technological development affects countries at different stages of economic development. He considers examples from several countries and discusses how emerging technologies may create opportunities for countries seeking to participate more fully in the global economy. The book also considers the effects of technological change on employment, education, economic inequality, and the future workplace.

== Reviews and reception ==
Tara D. Sonenshine in the New York Journal of Books called the book a good place to start "if you want to know how to survive and thrive in the fast-paced world of today and how to anticipate the opportunities of tomorrow's information age." Sonenshine also called out the book for focusing on women and multiculturalism. An article titled "Is predicting the future futile or necessary?" by Stephen Cave in the Financial Times is more critical, saying that Ross focuses on industries with already considerable coverage and investment but Cave points out that "rarely can the future be predicted by extending current trajectories."

Suzanne Locke, writing for The National, discussed the book's examination of emerging technologies including robotics, cybersecurity, big data, and changing forms of money and markets. She also highlighted Ross's discussion of how workers may need to adapt to technological changes in the global economy.

Publishers Weekly reviewed the book as a survey of emerging developments in technology and industry. The review highlighted Ross's discussion of robotics, life sciences, cyberwarfare, women's empowerment, income inequality, and changes in the workplace. It also noted the book's discussion of technological and economic developments in countries including Indonesia, Brazil, Chile, Peru, and Mexico.

== Publication ==
- The Industries of the Future, Alec Ross, Simon & Schuster, February 2, 2016, ISBN 978-1-4767-5365-2, Hardcover
