= Monroe v. Pape =

- Supreme Court of the United States

Argued 8 November, 1960 Decided 20 February, 1961
- Full case name: Monroe, et al. v. Pape, et al.
- Citations: 365 U.S. 167 (more) 81 S. Ct. 473; 5 L. Ed. 2d 492; 1961 U.S. LEXIS 1687

Holding
- While municipalities can not be liable under the Civil Rights Act of 1871, individuals acting “under color of law” can be sued for damages for denying the constitutional rights of individuals. 42 U.S.C. § 1983 was also meant to give a remedy to parties deprived of constitutional rights, privileges, and immunities by an official's abuse of his position, as the federal remedy was supplementary to any state remedy, and the latter need not have been first sought and refused before the federal one was invoked.

Court membership
- Chief Justice Earl Warren Associate Justices Hugo Black · Felix Frankfurter; William O. Douglas · Tom C. Clark; John M. Harlan II · William J. Brennan Jr. Charles E. Whittaker · Potter Stewart

Case opinions
- Majority: Douglas, joined by Warren, Black, Clark, Harlan, Brennan, Whittaker, Stewart
- Concurrence: Harlan, joined by Stewart
- Dissent: Frankfurter

Laws applied
- Fourteenth Amendment, Section 1 of the "Ku Klux Act" of 20 April 1871 (codified at 42 U.S.C. § 1983)
- Overruled by
- Monell v. Department of Social Services of the City of New York, 436 U.S. 658 (1978) (in part)

Monroe v. Pape, 365 U.S. 167 (1961), was a United States Supreme Court case that considered the application of federal civil rights law to constitutional violations by city employees. The case was significant because it held that 42 U.S.C. § 1983, a statutory provision from 1871, could be used to sue state officers who violated a plaintiff's constitutional rights. § 1983 had previously been a relatively obscure and little-used statute, but since Monroe it has become a central part of United States civil rights law.

== Background ==
Thirteen police officers of the City of Chicago, Illinois broke into the residence of the Monroe family. The officers roused the parents from their bed and made them stand naked in the living room while other officers ransacked every room of the house, emptying drawers and ripping mattress covers. Mr. Monroe was then taken to the police station and interrogated concerning a two-day-old murder case. He was not allowed to make any telephone calls or to contact a lawyer during his interrogation. He was not charged and was finally released. The police had not acted under authority of a search warrant or an arrest warrant when making the raid.

Plaintiffs Monroe (six African American children and their parents) sued the police officers and the City of Chicago for violating their civil rights under §1983.

The City of Chicago moved to dismiss the complaint on the ground that it could not be held liable under the Civil Rights Acts for acts committed in performance of its governmental functions. The District Court dismissed the complaint. The Court of Appeals for the Seventh Circuit affirmed. The Supreme Court granted certiorari to decide two particular constitutional questions: (1) whether Congress, in enacting §1979/§1983 meant to give a remedy to parties deprived constitutional rights, privileges and immunities by an official's abuse of his position; and (2) whether Congress sought to bring municipal corporations within the ambit of §1979/§1983.

== Opinion of the Court ==
The Supreme Court dismissed the complaint against the city itself, finding that Congress had not intended the word "person" in section 1983 to apply to municipalities. This aspect of Monroe was later partially overruled in Monell v. Department of Social Services of the City of New York, 436 U.S. 658 (1978) which held that local governments were "persons" under the act and could face liability under certain circumstances.

However, the Court reversed the lower court's dismissal of the complaint as against the officials. The Court concluded that Congress "meant to give a remedy to parties deprived of constitutional rights, privileges, and immunities by an official's abuse of his position" under section 1983. Furthermore, the federal remedy was available despite Illinois constitutional provisions that provided protections similar to those provided by the Fourteenth Amendment and section 1983. Monroe remains good law for the proposition that the "state action" language of section 1983 is satisfied by the actions of any state actor at any level of state government.

== Legal consequences ==
When Monroe v. Pape was decided, the annotations to 42 U.S.C.A. § 1981-1988 were contained in about 4 pages. Now those annotations consume approximately 2 volumes of the U.S.C.A.

This decision not only provided for compensation to injured citizens, but greatly deterred arbitrary actions by state officers. The scope of Monroe v. Pape covers much more than police brutality or racial bias; it has been invoked in cases ranging from improper land use decisions to inappropriate school allocations to wrongful denials of liquor licenses.

== See also ==
- Will v. Michigan Dept. of State Police
- List of United States Supreme Court cases, volume 365
