= List of United States Supreme Court cases, volume 365 =

This is a list of all the United States Supreme Court cases from volume 365 of the United States Reports:

Case name	Citation	Date decided
FPC v. Transcontinental Gas Pipe Line Corp.	365 U.S. 1	1961
Times Film Corp. v. City of Chicago	365 U.S. 43	1961
Campbell v. United States (1961)	365 U.S. 85	1961
McNeal v. Culver	365 U.S. 109	1961
NLRB v. Mattison Mach. Works	365 U.S. 123	1961
United States v. Parke, Davis & Co.	365 U.S. 125	1961
E.R.R. Presidents Conference v. Noerr Motor Freight, Inc.	365 U.S. 127	1961
United States v. Fruehauf	365 U.S. 146	1961
Maynard v. Durham & S.R.R. Co.	365 U.S. 160	1961
Monroe v. Pape	365 U.S. 167	1961
Schnell v. Peter Eckrich & Sons, Inc.	365 U.S. 260	1961
Costello v. United States	365 U.S. 265	1961
United States v. Lucchese	365 U.S. 290	1961
Bullock v. South Carolina	365 U.S. 292	1961
Nolan v. Transocean Air Lines	365 U.S. 293	1961
NLRB v. Celanese Corp.	365 U.S. 297	1961
Gates v. California	365 U.S. 297	1961
Turpentine & Rosin Factors, Inc. v. United States	365 U.S. 298	1961
Nat'l Psychological Ass'n v. Univ. of N.Y.	365 U.S. 298	1961
Snyder v. Newton	365 U.S. 299	1961
Cordak v. Reuben H. Donnelley Corp.	365 U.S. 299	1961
Synanon Foundation, Inc. v. California	365 U.S. 300	1961
Brooks v. South Carolina	365 U.S. 300	1961
Green v. United States	365 U.S. 301	1961
Clancy v. United States	365 U.S. 312	1961
Tampa Elec. Co. v. Nashville Coal Co.	365 U.S. 320	1961
Aro Mfg. Co. v. Convertible Top Replacement Co.	365 U.S. 336	1961
Wilson v. Schnettler	365 U.S. 381	1961
Wilkinson v. United States	365 U.S. 399	1961
Braden v. United States	365 U.S. 431	1961
Pugach v. Dollinger	365 U.S. 458	1961
Thompson v. Whittier	365 U.S. 465	1961
S.S. Kresge Co. v. Bowers	365 U.S. 466	1961
Mich. Nat'l Bank v. Michigan	365 U.S. 467	1961
Silverman v. United States	365 U.S. 505	1961
Egan v. Aurora	365 U.S. 514	1961
Thornton v. Ohio	365 U.S. 516	1961
Laurens Fed. Sav. & Loan Ass'n v. South Carolina Tax Comm'n	365 U.S. 517	1961
Reynolds v. Cochran	365 U.S. 525	1961
Rogers v. Richmond	365 U.S. 534	1961
Milanovich v. United States	365 U.S. 551	1961
Yale Transp.Corp. v. United States	365 U.S. 566	1961
Burd v. Wilkins	365 U.S. 566	1961
Jerrold Elec. Corp. v. United States	365 U.S. 567	1961
Louisiana ex rel. Allen v. Walker	365 U.S. 567	1961
Kan. City v. United States	365 U.S. 568	1961
Miller v. California	365 U.S. 568	1961
Orleans Parish Sch. Bd. v. Bush	365 U.S. 569	1961
Ferguson v. Georgia	365 U.S. 570	1961
Newsom v. Smyth	365 U.S. 604	1961
Allison v. Indiana	365 U.S. 608	1961
Florida ex rel. Israel v. Canova	365 U.S. 608	1961
van Hook v. United States	365 U.S. 609	1961
Hitchcock v. Arizona	365 U.S. 609	1961
Chapman v. United States	365 U.S. 610	1961
United States v. Va. Elec. & Power Co.	365 U.S. 624	1961
Saldana v. United States	365 U.S. 646	1961
Ridgefield Park v. Bd. of Taxation	365 U.S. 648	1961
Utah Citizens Rate Ass'n v. United States	365 U.S. 649	1961
Boyden v. California	365 U.S. 650	1961
Carpenters v. NLRB	365 U.S. 651	1961
Teamsters v. NLRB	365 U.S. 667	1961
NLRB v. News Syndicate Co.	365 U.S. 695	1961
Typographical Union v. NLRB	365 U.S. 705	1961
Smith v. Bennett	365 U.S. 708	1961
Burton v. Wilmington Parking Auth.	365 U.S. 715	1961
Kossick v. United Fruit Co.	365 U.S. 731	1961
Moses Lake Homes, Inc. v. Grant Cnty.	365 U.S. 744	1961
Bulova Watch Co. v. United States	365 U.S. 753	1961
Coppola v. United States	365 U.S. 762	1961
Bolton v. Schuylkill Haven	365 U.S. 767	1961
Walgreen Co. v. Comm'r	365 U.S. 767	1961
Verret v. Oil Transp. Co.	365 U.S. 768	1961
Great Cove Realty Co. v. Brenner	365 U.S. 769	1961
Arco Auto Carriers, Inc. v. Arkansas ex rel. Bennett	365 U.S. 770	1961
