= Incorporation of the Bill of Rights =

Application of the U.S. Bill of Rights to states and their local governments

In United States constitutional law, incorporation is the doctrine by which portions of the Bill of Rights have been made applicable to the states. When the Bill of Rights was ratified, the courts held that its protections extended only to the actions of the federal government and that the Bill of Rights did not place limitations on the authority of the states and their local governments. However, the post–Civil War era, beginning in 1865 with the Thirteenth Amendment, which declared the abolition of slavery, gave rise to the incorporation of other amendments, applying more rights to the states and people over time. Gradually, various portions of the Bill of Rights have been held to be applicable to the states and their local governments by incorporation via the Due Process Clause of the Fourteenth Amendment of 1868.

Prior to the ratification of the Fourteenth Amendment and the development of the incorporation doctrine, the Supreme Court in 1833 held in Barron v. Baltimore that the Bill of Rights applied only to the federal, but not any state, governments. Even years after the ratification of the Fourteenth Amendment, the Supreme Court in United States v. Cruikshank (1876) still held that the First and Second Amendment did not apply to state governments. However, beginning in the 1920s, a series of Supreme Court decisions interpreted the Fourteenth Amendment to "incorporate" most portions of the Bill of Rights, making these portions, for the first time, enforceable against the state governments.

== History ==
=== Background ===
No person shall ... be deprived of life, liberty, or property, without due process of law ...

— Due Process Clause of the Fifth Amendment (1791)

The United States Bill of Rights is the first ten amendments to the United States Constitution. Proposed following the oftentimes bitter 1787–88 battle over ratification of the United States Constitution, and crafted to address the objections raised by Anti-Federalists, the Bill of Rights amendments add to the Constitution specific guarantees of personal freedoms and rights, clear limitations on the government's power in judicial and other proceedings, and explicit declarations that all powers not specifically delegated to Congress by the Constitution are reserved for the states or the people. The concepts enumerated in these amendments are built upon those found in several earlier documents, including the Virginia Declaration of Rights and the English Bill of Rights 1689, along with earlier documents such as Magna Carta (1215). Although James Madison's proposed amendments included a provision to extend the protection of some of the Bill of Rights to the states, the amendments that were finally submitted for ratification applied only to the federal government.

[N]or shall any State deprive any person of life, liberty, or property, without due process of law ...

— Due Process Clause of the Fourteenth Amendment (1868)

In the 1833 case of Barron v. Baltimore, the Supreme Court of the United States held that the Bill of Rights did not apply to state governments; such protections were instead provided by the constitutions of each state. After the Civil War, Congress and the states ratified the Fourteenth Amendment, which included the Due Process Clause and the Privileges or Immunities Clause. While the Fifth Amendment had included a due process clause, the due process clause of the Fourteenth Amendment crucially differed from the Fifth Amendment in that it explicitly applied to the states. The Privileges or Immunities Clause also explicitly applied to the states, unlike the Privileges and Immunities Clause of Article IV of the Constitution. In the Slaughter-House Cases (1873), the Supreme Court ruled that the Privileges or Immunities Clause was not designed to protect individuals from the actions of state governments. In Twining v. New Jersey (1908), the Supreme Court acknowledged that the Due Process Clause might incorporate some of the Bill of Rights, but continued to reject any incorporation under the Privileges or Immunities Clause.

=== Incorporation ===
The doctrine of incorporation has been traced back to either Chicago, Burlington & Quincy Railroad Co. v. City of Chicago (1897) or, more commonly, to Gitlow v. New York (1925). In Chicago Railroad, the Supreme Court appeared to require some form of just compensation for property appropriated by state or local authorities, which was also provided by a state statute. "Although the Court did not speak explicitly of the Fourteenth Amendment incorporating the takings clause, that was the practical effect of the decision." In Gitlow, the Court expressly incorporated the First Amendment against the states, and expressly held that States were bound to protect freedom of speech. The role of the Fourteenth Amendment in protecting the rights in the Bill of Rights was raised in some earlier cases, in which litigants argued that some of those rights were "fundamental and essential rights," but those challengers did not expressly argue that the Fourteenth Amendment incorporated them against the states.

Since the early twentieth century, the Court has steadily incorporated most of the significant provisions of the Bill of Rights. Provisions that the Supreme Court has not specifically incorporated include the Fifth Amendment right to an indictment by a grand jury, and the Seventh Amendment right to a jury trial in civil lawsuits.

Incorporation applies both procedurally and substantively to the guarantees of the states. Thus, procedurally, only a jury can convict a defendant of a serious crime, since the Sixth Amendment jury-trial right has been incorporated against the states; substantively, for example, states must recognize the First Amendment prohibition against a state-established religion, regardless of whether state laws and constitutions offer such a prohibition. The Supreme Court declined to apply new procedural constitutional rights retroactively against the states in criminal cases in Teague v. Lane, 489 U.S. 288 (1989).

Rep. John Bingham, the principal framer of the Fourteenth Amendment, advocated that the Fourteenth applied the first eight Amendments of the Bill of Rights to the States. The U.S. Supreme Court subsequently declined to interpret it that way, despite the dissenting argument in the 1947 case of Adamson v. California by Supreme Court justice Hugo Black that the framers' intent should control the Court's interpretation of the Fourteenth Amendment (he included a lengthy appendix that quoted extensively from Bingham's congressional testimony). Although the Adamson Court declined to adopt Black's interpretation, the Court during the following twenty-five years employed a doctrine of selective incorporation that succeeded in extending against the states almost all of the protections in the Bill of Rights, as well as other, unenumerated rights. The Bill of Rights thus imposes legal limits on the powers of governments and acts as an anti-majoritarian/minoritarian safeguard by providing deeply entrenched legal protection for various civil liberties and fundamental rights. The Supreme Court for example concluded in the West Virginia State Board of Education v. Barnette (1943) case that the founders intended the Bill of Rights to put some rights out of reach from majorities, ensuring that some liberties would endure beyond political majorities. As the Court noted, the idea of the Bill of Rights "was to withdraw certain subjects from the vicissitudes of political controversy, to place them beyond the reach of majorities and officials and to establish them as legal principles to be applied by the courts." This is why "fundamental rights may not be submitted to a vote; they depend on the outcome of no elections." The 14th Amendment has vastly expanded civil rights protections and is cited in more litigation than any other amendment to the U.S. Constitution.

=== Selective versus total incorporation ===
In the 1940s and 1960s the Supreme Court gradually issued a series of decisions incorporating several of the specific rights from the Bill of Rights, so as to be binding upon the States. A dissenting school of thought championed by Justices Hugo Black and William O. Douglas supported that incorporation of specific rights, but urged incorporation of all specific rights instead of just some of them. Black was for so-called mechanical incorporation, or total incorporation, of Amendments 1 through 8 of the Bill of Rights. Black felt that the Fourteenth Amendment required the States to respect all of the enumerated rights set forth in the first eight amendments, but he did not wish to see the doctrine expanded to include other, unenumerated "fundamental rights" that might be based on the Ninth Amendment. The Tenth Amendment was excluded from total incorporation as well, due to it already being patently concerned with the power of the states. Black felt that his formulation eliminated any arbitrariness or caprice in deciding what the Fourteenth Amendment ought to protect, by sticking to words already found in the Constitution. Although Black was willing to invalidate federal statutes on federalism grounds, he was not inclined to read any of the first eight amendments as states' rights provisions as opposed to individual rights provisions. Justice Black felt that the Fourteenth Amendment was designed to apply the first eight amendments from the Bill of Rights to the states, as he expressed in his dissenting opinion in Adamson v. California. This view was again expressed by Black in his concurrence in Duncan v. Louisiana citing the Fourteenth Amendment's Privileges or Immunities Clause: "'No state shall make or enforce any law which shall abridge the privileges or immunities of citizens of the United States' seem to me an eminently reasonable way of expressing the idea that henceforth the Bill of Rights shall apply to the States."

=== Due process interpretation ===
Justice Felix Frankfurter, however, felt that the incorporation process ought to be incremental, and that the federal courts should only apply those sections of the Bill of Rights whose abridgment would "shock the conscience," as he put it in Rochin v. California (1952). Such a selective incorporation approach followed that of Justice Moody, who wrote in Twining v. New Jersey (1908) that "It is possible that some of the personal rights safeguarded by the first eight Amendments against National action may also be safeguarded against state action, because a denial of them would be a denial of due process of law. If this is so, it is not because those rights are enumerated in the first eight Amendments, but because they are of such a nature that they are included in the conception of due process of law." The due process approach thus considers a right to be incorporated not because it was listed in the Bill of Rights, but only because it is required by the definition of due process, which may change over time. For example, Moody's decision in Twining stated that the 5th Amendment right against self-incrimination was not inherent in a conception of due process and so did not apply to states, but was overruled in Malloy v. Hogan (1964). Similarly, Justice Cardozo stated in Palko v. Connecticut (1937) that the right against double jeopardy was not inherent to due process and so does not apply to the states, but that was overruled in Benton v. Maryland (1969). Frankfurter's incrementalist approach did carry the day, but the end result is very nearly what Justice Black advocated, with the exceptions noted below.

=== Incorporation under privileges or immunities ===
No State shall make or enforce any law which shall abridge the privileges or immunities of citizens of the United States. ...

— Privileges or Immunities Clause of the Fourteenth Amendment

Some have suggested that the Privileges or Immunities Clause would be a more appropriate textual basis than the due process clause for incorporation of the Bill of Rights. It is often said that the Slaughter-House Cases "gutted the privileges or immunities clause" and thus prevented its use for applying the Bill of Rights against the states. In his dissent to Adamson v. California, however, Justice Hugo Black pointed out that the Slaughter-House Cases did not directly involve any right enumerated in the Constitution:

[T]he state law under consideration in the Slaughter-House cases was only challenged as one which authorized a monopoly, and the brief for the challenger properly conceded that there was "no direct constitutional provision against a monopoly." The argument did not invoke any specific provision of the Bill of Rights, but urged that the state monopoly statute violated "the natural right of a person" to do business and engage in his trade or vocation.

Thus, in Black's view, the Slaughterhouse Cases should not impede incorporation of the Bill of Rights against the states, via the Privileges or Immunities Clause. Some scholars go even further, and argue that the Slaughterhouse Cases affirmatively supported incorporation of the Bill of Rights against the states. In dicta, Justice Miller's opinion in Slaughterhouse went so far as to acknowledge that the "right to peaceably assemble and petition for redress of grievances ... are rights of the citizen guaranteed by the Federal Constitution," although in context Miller may have only been referring to assemblies for petitioning the federal government.

In the 2010 landmark case McDonald v. Chicago, the Supreme Court declared the Second Amendment is incorporated through the Due Process Clause. However, Justice Thomas, the fifth justice in the majority, criticized substantive due process and declared instead that he reached the same incorporation only through the Privileges or Immunities Clause. This is considered by some as a "revival" of the Privileges or Immunities Clause, however as it is a concurring opinion and not the majority opinion in the case, it is not binding precedent in lower courts; it is merely an indication that SCOTUS may be inclined, given the proper question, to reconsider and ultimately reverse the Slaughterhouse Cases.

In the 2019 case Timbs v. Indiana, the Supreme Court, citing McDonald, ruled that the Eighth Amendment's Excessive Fines Clause is incorporated through the Due Process Clause. Justice Thomas did not join this opinion; in a separate opinion concurring in the judgment, he once again declared that he would reach the same incorporation through the Privileges or Immunities Clause. Justice Gorsuch took an in-between position. He joined the opinion of the Court, but wrote a short concurrence acknowledging that the Privileges or Immunities Clause might be the better vehicle for incorporation—but ultimately deciding that nothing in the case itself turned on the question of which clause is the source of the incorporation.

==== Possible consequences of the Privileges or Immunities approach ====
In the Timbs decision, one of Justice Thomas's stated reasons for preferring incorporation through the Privileges or Immunities Clause was what he perceived as the Court's failure to consistently or correctly define which rights are "fundamental" under the Due Process Clause. In Thomas's view, incorporation through Privileges or Immunities would allow the Court to exclude rights from incorporation that had erroneously been deemed fundamental in previous decisions.

Another difference between incorporation through Due Process versus Privileges or Immunities is that the text of the Privileges or Immunities Clause refers only to the privileges or immunities of "citizens," while the Due Process Clause protects the due process rights of "any person." It is possible that a switch to Privileges or Immunities incorporation would limit protections of the rights of non-citizens against state governments.

== Specific amendments ==
Many of the provisions of the First Amendment were applied to the States in the 1930s and 1940s, but most of the procedural protections provided to criminal defendants were not enforced against the States until the Warren Court of the 1960s, famous for its concern for the rights of those accused of crimes, brought state standards in line with federal requirements. The following list enumerates, by amendment and individual clause, the Supreme Court cases that have incorporated the rights contained in the Bill of Rights. (The Ninth Amendment is not listed; its wording indicates that it "is not a source of rights as such; it is simply a rule about how to read the Constitution." The Tenth Amendment is also not listed; by its wording, it is a reservation of powers to the states and to the people.)

=== Amendment I ===
Guarantee against establishment of religion

- This provision has been incorporated against the states. See Everson v. Board of Education, 330 U.S. 1 (1947).

Guarantee of free exercise of religion

- This provision has been incorporated against the states. See Cantwell v. Connecticut, 310 U.S. 296 (1940).

Guarantee of freedom of speech

- This provision has been incorporated against the states. See Gitlow v. New York, 268 U.S. 652 (1925) and Stromberg v. California, 283 U.S. 359 (1931).

Guarantee of freedom of the press

- This provision has been incorporated against the states. See Gitlow v. New York, 268 U.S. 652 (1925) Near v. Minnesota, 283 U.S. 697 (1931).

Guarantee of freedom of assembly

- This provision has been incorporated against the states. See De Jonge v. Oregon, 299 U.S. 353 (1937).

Guarantee of the right to petition for redress of grievances

- This provision has been incorporated against the states. See Edwards v. South Carolina, 372 U.S. 229 (1963).

Guarantee of freedom of expressive association

- This right, though not in the words of the first amendment, was first mentioned in the case NAACP v. Alabama, 357 U.S. 449 (1958) and was at that time applied to the states. See also Roberts v. United States Jaycees, 468 U.S. 609 (1984), where the U.S. Supreme Court held that "implicit in the right to engage in activities protected by the First Amendment" is "a corresponding right to associate with others in pursuit of a wide variety of political, social, economic, educational, religious, and cultural ends."

=== Amendment II ===
Right to keep and bear arms

- This right has been incorporated against the states. The Second Amendment was described as a fundamental and individual right that will necessarily be subject to strict scrutiny by the courts, see McDonald v. City of Chicago (2010). Self defense is described as "the central component" of the Second Amendment in McDonald and upheld District of Columbia v. Heller 554 U.S (2008) concluding the Fourteenth Amendment incorporates the Second Amendment right, recognized in Heller, to keep and bear arms for the purpose of self-defense.

=== Amendment III ===
Freedom from quartering of soldiers

- This provision has been incorporated against the states within the jurisdiction of the United States Court of Appeals for the Second Circuit, but has not been incorporated against the states elsewhere. The Supreme Court has not yet heard an appeal about applying this protection in all states.

In 1982, the Second Circuit applied the Third Amendment to the states in Engblom v. Carey. This is a binding authority over the federal courts in Connecticut, New York, and Vermont, but is only a persuasive authority over the other courts in the United States.

The Tenth Circuit has suggested that the right is incorporated because the Bill of Rights explicitly codifies the "fee ownership system developed in English law" through the Third, Fourth, and Fifth Amendments, and the Fourteenth Amendment likewise forbids the states from depriving citizens of their property without due process of law. See United States v. Nichols, 841 F.2d 1485, 1510 n.1 (10th Cir. 1988).

=== Amendment IV ===
Unreasonable search and seizure

- This right has been incorporated against the states by the Supreme Court's decision in Mapp v. Ohio, 367 U.S. 643 (1961), although there is dicta in Wolf v. Colorado, 338 U.S. 25 (1949), saying the "core" of the Fourth Amendment applied to the States.
- The remedy of exclusion of unlawfully seized evidence, the exclusionary rule, has been incorporated against the states. See Mapp v. Ohio. In Mapp, the Court overruled Wolf v. Colorado in which the Court had ruled that the exclusionary rule did not apply to the states.

Warrant requirements

- The various warrant requirements have been incorporated against the states. See Aguilar v. Texas, 378 U.S. 108 (1964).
- The standards for judging whether a search or seizure undertaken without a warrant was "unreasonable" also have been incorporated against the states. See Ker v. California, 374 U.S. 23 (1963).

=== Amendment V ===
Right to indictment by a grand jury

- This right has been held not to be incorporated against the states. See Hurtado v. California, 110 U.S. 516 (1884).

Protection against double jeopardy

- This right has been incorporated against the states. See Benton v. Maryland, 395 U.S. 784 (1969). However, this is generally limited by the doctrine of dual sovereignty, according to which a conviction, or acquittal, in federal court does not prevent a conviction in state court for the same crime, and a conviction in a court of one state does not prevent a conviction for the same action in a court of another state. See Bartkus v. Illinois, 359 U.S. 121 (1959), Heath v. Alabama, 474 U.S. 82 (1985), Gamble v. United States (2019).

Constitutional privilege against self-incrimination

- This right has been incorporated against the states.
  1. Self Incrimination in Court See Griffin v. California, 380 U.S. 609 (1965), Malloy v. Hogan, 378 U.S. 1 (1964).
  2. Miranda See Miranda v. Arizona, 384 U.S. 436 (1966).

Right to Due Process of Law

- This right has not formally been incorporated, with the Court reasoning that the Fourteenth Amendment already protects due process of law against state violation. It first defended the Fourteenth Amendment as protecting due process of law at the state level in Scott v. McNeal, 154 U.S. 34, at 45 (1894).

Protection against taking of private property without just compensation

- This right has been incorporated against the states. See Chicago, Burlington & Quincy Railroad Co. v. City of Chicago, 166 U.S. 226 (1897).

=== Amendment VI ===
Right to a speedy trial

- This right has been incorporated against the states. See Klopfer v. North Carolina, 386 U.S. 213 (1967).

Right to a public trial

- This right has been incorporated against the states. See In re Oliver, 333 U.S. 257 (1948).

Right to trial by impartial jury

- This right has been incorporated against the states. See Duncan v. Louisiana, 391 U.S. 145 (1968), which guarantees the right to a jury trial in non-petty cases. See also Parker v. Gladden, 385 U.S. 363 (1966), where the Supreme Court ruled "that the statements of the bailiff to the jurors are controlled by the command of the Sixth Amendment, made applicable to the States through the Due Process Clause of the Fourteenth Amendment. It guarantees that 'the accused shall enjoy the right to a trial, by an impartial jury ....'" However, the size of the jury vary between federal and state courts. Even so, the Supreme Court has ruled that a jury in a criminal case may have as few as six members. Williams v. Florida, 399 U.S. 78 (1970). Furthermore, there is no right to a jury trial in juvenile delinquency proceedings held in state court. See McKeiver v. Pennsylvania, 403 U.S. 528 (1971). The Supreme Court ruled in Ramos v. Louisiana (2020) that a unanimous jury vote requirement for criminal convictions is further incorporated against the states, overturning the prior Apodaca v. Oregon (1972) which had allowed states to make this determination on its own.

Right to a jury selected from residents of the state and district where the crime occurred

- This right has not been incorporated against the states. See Zicarelli v. Dietz, 633 F.2d 312 (3rd Cir. 1980). In Zicarelli v. Gray, 543 F.2d 466 (3d Cir. 1976), a lower federal court "assumed" that state governments could not violate the vicinage right. The Supreme Court has not yet heard a case concerning application of this federal right to the state level.

Right to notice of accusations

- This right has been incorporated against the states. See In re Oliver, 333 U.S. 257 (1948). See also Rabe v. Washington, 405 U.S. 313 (1972).

Right to confront adverse witnesses

- This right has been incorporated against the states. See Pointer v. Texas, 380 U.S. 400 (1965).

Right to compulsory process (subpoenas) to obtain witness testimony

- This right has been incorporated against the states. See Washington v. Texas, 388 U.S. 14 (1967).

Right to assistance of counsel

- This right has been incorporated against the states. See Powell v. Alabama 287 U.S. 45 (1932), for capital cases, see Gideon v. Wainwright, 372 U.S. 335 (1963) for all felony cases, and see Argersinger v. Hamlin, 407 U.S. 25 (1972) for imprisonable misdemeanors. In subsequent decisions, the Court extended the right to counsel to any case in which a jail sentence is imposed.
- However, the right to petition a federal court for relief against ineffective assistance of state-level council has not been incorporated against the states if the evidentiary basis for such a procedure was not introduced into the state trial record. See Shinn v. Martinez Ramirez, 596 U.S. ___ (2022).

=== Amendment VII ===
Right to jury trial in civil cases

- This right has not been incorporated against the states. See Dohany v. Rogers, 281 U.S. 362 (1930), Walker v. Sauvinet, 92 U.S. 90 (1876). In Walker, Justice Morrison Waite ruled that the Fourteenth Amendment did not compel states to provide jury trials for civil matters because states "are left to regulate trials in their own courts in their own way. A trial by jury in suits at common law pending in the State courts is not, therefore, a privilege or immunity of national citizenship."

Re-Examination Clause

- This right has not been incorporated against the states. See The Justices v. Murray, 76 U.S. (9 Wall.) 274 (1870), and Minneapolis & St. Louis R. Co. v. Bombolis, 241 U.S. 211 (1916). The right prevents federal courts from retrying a civil jury case without following common law procedures, but not state courts. As the Court ruled in Justices, "the seventh amendment could not be invoked in a State court to prohibit it from re-examining, on a writ of error, facts that had been tried by a jury in the court below."

=== Amendment VIII ===
Protection against excessive bail

- This right may have been incorporated against the states. In Schilb v. Kuebel, 404 U.S. 357 (1971), the Court stated in dicta: "Bail, of course, is basic to our system of law, and the Eighth Amendment's proscription of excessive bail has been assumed to have application to the States through the Fourteenth Amendment." In Murphy v. Hunt, 455 U.S. 478 (1982), the Court did not reach the issue because the case was dismissed as moot. Bail was included in the list of incorporated rights in McDonald footnote 12, citing Schilb.

Protection against excessive fines

- This right has been incorporated against the states. See Timbs v. Indiana (2019), in which Justice Ruth Bader Ginsburg wrote for the majority "For good reason, the protection against excessive fines has been a constant shield throughout Anglo-American history: Exorbitant tolls undermine other constitutional liberties."

Protection against cruel and unusual punishments

- This right has been incorporated against the states. See Robinson v. California, 370 U.S. 660 (1962). This holding has led the Court to suggest, in dicta, that the excessive bail and excessive fines protections have also been incorporated. See Baze v. Rees, 128 S. Ct. 1520, 1529 (2008).

== Reverse incorporation ==
A similar legal doctrine to incorporation is that of reverse incorporation. Whereas incorporation applies the Bill of Rights to the states through the Equal Protection Clause and the Due Process Clause of the Fourteenth Amendment, equality before the law is required under the laws of the federal government by the Due Process Clause of the Fifth Amendment. For example, in Bolling v. Sharpe, 347 U.S. 497 (1954), which was a companion case to Brown v. Board of Education, the schools of the District of Columbia were desegregated even though the district is a federal enclave. Likewise, in Adarand Constructors, Inc. v. Peña 515 U.S. 200 (1995), an affirmative action program by the federal government was subjected to strict scrutiny based on equal protection.
