= Griffin v. California =

- Supreme Court of the United States

Argued March 9, 1965 Decided April 28, 1965
- Full case name: Griffin v. California
- Citations: 380 U.S. 609 (more) 85 S. Ct. 1229; 14 L. Ed. 2d 106

Case history
- Prior: Defendant convicted, California court; affirmed, California Supreme Court.
- Subsequent: Subsequent trial ended in a mistrial; third trial found defendant guilty of murder.

Holding
- Prosecutor's reference in closing argument to defendant's exercising his right to refuse to testify, and instruction allowing jury to consider it, violate that right.

Court membership
- Chief Justice Earl Warren Associate Justices Hugo Black · William O. Douglas; Tom C. Clark · John M. Harlan II; William J. Brennan Jr. · Potter Stewart; Byron White · Arthur Goldberg

Case opinions
- Majority: Douglas, joined by Black, Clark, Brennan, Goldberg
- Concurrence: Harlan
- Dissent: Stewart, joined by White
- Warren took no part in the consideration or decision of the case.

Laws applied
- U.S. Const. amend. V, by way of XIV

Griffin v. California, 380 U.S. 609 (1965), was a United States Supreme Court case in which the Court ruled, by a 6–2 vote, that it is a violation of a defendant's Fifth Amendment rights for the prosecutor to comment to the jury on the defendant's declining to testify, or for the judge to instruct the jury that such silence is evidence of guilt.

The ruling specified that this new extension to defendants' Fifth Amendment rights was binding on all States through the Due Process Clause of the Fourteenth Amendment. This "no-comment rule" had already been binding on the federal government's courts because of an 1878 law.

== Background of the case ==
Edward Dean Griffin was convicted of the murder of Essie Mae Hodson before a jury in a California court. Griffin had been invited into an apartment shared by Hodson and her boyfriend, Eddie Seay. After going to bed, Seay was awakened by noise; he saw Griffin and Hodson struggling, and Hodson said Griffin had tried to force her to have sex. After Seay locked Griffin outside the apartment, Griffin broke back into the apartment and struck Seay, who ran to a bar for help. Upon returning, Griffin and Hodson were gone. In the morning, a witness saw Griffin, buttoning up his pants, coming out of a very large trash box in an alley about 300 feet from Hodson's apartment. The witness found Hodson in the trash box, bleeding and apparently in shock. She died at a hospital the next day from her injuries. Griffin, who already had multiple felony convictions, did not testify at the trial.

As the U.S. Supreme Court said in its ruling, the prosecutor in the final argument to the jury "made much of the failure of [Griffin] to testify":

Essie Mae is dead. She can't tell you her side of the story. The defendant won't.

The judge, in his instructions to the jury, stated that a defendant has a constitutional right not to testify, and that this did not create a presumption of guilt, nor reduce the need for the prosecution to prove its case; but also stated to the jury:

As to any evidence or facts against him which the defendant can reasonably be expected to deny or explain because of facts within his knowledge, if he does not testify or if, though he does testify, he fails to deny or explain such evidence, the jury may take that failure into consideration as tending to indicate the truth of such evidence.

This jury instruction was valid under the California Constitution, whose "comment practice" clause in Article I stated at the time, "[I]n any criminal case, whether the defendant testifies or not, his failure to explain or to deny by his testimony any evidence or facts in the case against him may be commented upon by the court and by counsel, and may be considered by the court or the jury."

Griffin was convicted and sentenced to the death penalty. The California Supreme Court affirmed the conviction, and subsequently the U.S. Supreme Court granted certiorari to determine "whether comment on the failure to testify violated the Self-Incrimination Clause of the Fifth Amendment which we made applicable to the States by the Fourteenth in Malloy v. Hogan."

== History and legal background ==
Until the late 19th century, defendants in criminal trials in the United States were not allowed to testify. Starting in 1864, the States started to allow this practice, until by the end of the 20th century, Georgia was the only State that still prohibited testimony from the defendant.

A new concern was that although under the Fifth Amendment no defendant could be forced to testify, now that testifying was permitted, "the failure of a defendant to testify would be seen as a confession of guilt and that jurors would draw this inference regardless of any instructions they might receive." To help reduce the impact or the likelihood of this inference, the federal government passed a law in 1878 called the "no-comment rule", prohibiting prosecutors from commenting on the failure to testify, and prohibiting any presumption against the defendant based on his failure to testify. (This law is currently 18 U.S.C. § 3481.)

This federal law applied only to the federal courts, and because of the principle of federalism, the States made their own decisions on this matter. For example, the California Constitution explicitly permitted counsel and the judge to comment on the failure to testify.

In two rulings before Griffin, Twining v. New Jersey (1908) and Adamson v. California (1947), the Supreme Court upheld state laws allowing such adverse comments, ruling that even if adverse comments did violate defendants' Fifth Amendment rights, the Fifth Amendment did not bind the States. In Malloy v. Hogan (1964), the Court reversed this stance, ruling that the Due Process Clause of the Fourteenth Amendment extended Fifth Amendment protections against self-incrimination to State trials.

== The ruling ==
Justice Douglas wrote for the Court that a prosecutor's or judge's comment to the jury about a defendant's refusal to testify "is a remnant of the 'inquisitorial system of criminal justice', which the Fifth Amendment outlaws. It is a penalty imposed by courts for exercising a constitutional privilege. It cuts down on the privilege by making its assertion costly."

The Court then noted that an objection to this logic might be that a jury might find it "natural and irresistible" to infer the guilt of a defendant who refused to testify while possessing facts about the evidence against him, and so a judge's commenting upon the refusal did not "magnify that inference into a penalty for asserting a constitutional privilege"; but went on to state that a judge's comment on the refusal "solemnizes the silence of the accused into evidence against him."

In a footnote, the Court noted that this ruling was "no innovation", because a majority of the Court had already written in Adamson v. California (1947) that California's "comment practice" violated the Fifth Amendment. At the time, however, the Court had not yet ruled that the Fourteenth Amendment made the Fifth Amendment applicable to the States.

=== Justice Harlan's concurrence ===
Justice Harlan concurred "with great reluctance", agreeing with the Court that "within the federal judicial system the Fifth Amendment bars adverse comment by federal prosecutors and judges on a defendant's failure to take the stand in a criminal trial", but writing that this "no-comment" rule was a "non-fundamental" part of the Fifth Amendment, and that he would only apply it to the States because of the previous term's Malloy v. Hogan decision. (Justice Harlan had dissented from the Malloy decision, writing that the "compelled uniformity" of applying the Fifth Amendment to the States "carries extremely mischievous, if not dangerous, consequences for our federal system".) Justice Harlan wrote that state and federal courts need not run by the same rules and that cases such as Griffin showed that the practical tendency had been for the federal judiciary to override the state judiciary, which was contrary to the basic idea of federalism; and that he hoped "that the Court will eventually return to constitutional paths which, until recently, it has followed throughout its history."

=== The dissent ===
Justice Stewart, joined by Justice White, dissented, writing that the Fifth Amendment states that no person "shall be compelled in any criminal case to be a witness against himself", and that California's "comment rule" did not "compel" the defendant nor anyone else to testify. Also, "the California procedure is not only designed to protect the defendant against unwarranted inferences which might be drawn by an uninformed jury; it is also an attempt by the State to recognize and articulate what it believes to be the natural probative force of certain facts."

Justice Stewart wrote that the formulation of such rules "is properly a matter of local concern", and noted that the American Bar Association and the American Law Institute had endorsed the "comment" practice.

== Significance and criticism ==
In Mitchell v. United States (1999), the Court extended Griffin's no-comment rule to the sentencing phase of State trials. Justice Scalia wrote in his dissent that Griffin "did not even pretend to be rooted in a historical understanding of the Fifth Amendment. Rather, in a breathtaking act of sorcery it simply transformed legislative policy into constitutional command", and that "To my mind, Griffin was a wrong turn – which is not cause enough to overrule it, but is cause enough to resist its extension." This dissent was joined by three other Justices, including Justice Thomas, who added in a separate dissent that Griffin "lacks foundation in the Constitution's text, history, or logic", and should be overruled outright.

A 1980 article in the Michigan Law Review stated that Griffin occurred "at the peak of [the Supreme Court's] enthusiasm to expand the constitutional protections of criminal defendants", and that it has "impaired the effective operation of the criminal justice system", automatically reversing cases where the defendant's silence is mentioned but being a "complete failure to address the much more common situation in which no comment is made by judge or prosecutor but the jury nonetheless concludes that the defendant is guilty because he has nothing to offer in his own defense."

Great American Court Cases wrote that the Griffin ruling "preserved the presumption of innocence to which a defendant is constitutionally entitled."

The United Kingdom had a no-comment rule similar to that established in Griffin, but the rule was reversed in Northern Ireland in 1988 as a response to IRA terrorism, and later the reversal was extended to England and Wales. Using this reversal as an argument, a 2007 article in the William & Mary Bill of Rights Journal argued that "Griffin's no-comment rule has never faced a challenge as daunting as that posed by modern domestic terrorism", and that it is currently "vulnerable" to reversal.

== Subsequent events in the case ==
After the U.S. Supreme Court's reversal of Griffin's conviction, he was tried again for murder, and a mistrial was declared when the jury was deadlocked 2 to 10 in favor of a second-degree murder conviction. In his third trial, the jury found Griffin guilty of first-degree murder and sentenced him to death. Upon automatic appeal (because of the jury's recommendation of the death penalty), the court overturned the conviction once again because the trial court had allowed the jury to hear evidence of a previous rape charge without mentioning that Griffin was acquitted of the charge. At his fourth trial Griffin was convicted once again and sentenced to life imprisonment.
