= Gitlow v. New York =

- Supreme Court of the United States

Argued April 12, 1923 Reargued November 23, 1923 Decided June 8, 1925
- Full case name: Benjamin Gitlow v. People of the State of New York
- Citations: 268 U.S. 652 (more) 45 S. Ct. 625; 69 L. Ed. 1138; 1925 U.S. LEXIS 598

Case history
- Prior: Defendant convicted, Supreme Court of New York County, 2-5-20; affirmed, 195 A.D. 773 (N.Y. Sup. Ct. App. Div. 1921); affirmed, 136 N.E. 317 (N.Y. 1923)
- Subsequent: None

Holding
- The Fourteenth Amendment prohibits states from infringing free speech, but the defendant was properly convicted under New York's Criminal Anarchy Law because he disseminated newspapers that advocated the violent overthrow of the government.

Court membership
- Chief Justice William H. Taft Associate Justices Oliver W. Holmes Jr. · Willis Van Devanter; James C. McReynolds · Louis Brandeis; George Sutherland · Pierce Butler; Edward T. Sanford · Harlan F. Stone

Case opinions
- Majority: Sanford, joined by Taft, Van Devanter, McReynolds, Sutherland, Butler, Stone
- Dissent: Holmes, joined by Brandeis

Laws applied
- U.S. Const. amends. I, XIV; N.Y. Penal Law §§ 160, 161

Gitlow v. New York, 268 U.S. 652 (1925), was a landmark decision of the United States Supreme Court holding that the Fourteenth Amendment to the United States Constitution had extended the First Amendment's provisions protecting freedom of speech and freedom of the press to apply to the governments of U.S. states. Along with Chicago, Burlington & Quincy Railroad Co. v. City of Chicago (1897), it was one of the first major cases involving the incorporation of the Bill of Rights. It was also one of a series of Supreme Court cases that defined the scope of the First Amendment's protection of free speech and established the standard to which a state or the federal government would be held when it criminalized speech or writing.

The case arose from the conviction under New York state law of Socialist politician and journalist Benjamin Gitlow for the publication of a "left-wing manifesto" in 1919. In a majority opinion joined by six other justices, Associate Justice Edward Terry Sanford upheld the conviction under the bad tendency test, writing that government may suppress or punish speech that directly advocates the unlawful overthrow of the government. Associate Justice Oliver Wendell Holmes Jr. dissented, arguing that state and federal governments should only be permitted to limit free speech under the "clear and present danger" test that he had previously laid out in Schenck v. United States (1919).

In his majority opinion, Sanford laid out the grounds for incorporation of freedom of speech and freedom of the press, holding that they were among the rights protected by the Due Process Clause of the Fourteenth Amendment. Later Supreme Court cases such as De Jonge v. Oregon (1937) would incorporate other provisions of the Bill of Rights on the same basis as Gitlow.

== Background ==
New York's Criminal Anarchy Law was passed in 1902 following the assassination of President William McKinley by an anarchist in Buffalo, New York, in September 1901. Under the Criminal Anarchy Law, people seen as activists supporting the destruction of American government through revolutionary means could be arrested in an attempt to prevent American Bolsheviks from gaining a national following.

Following the Red Scare of 1919–20, a variety of leftists, either anarchists, sympathizers with the Bolshevik Revolution, labor activists, or members of a communist or socialist party, were convicted for violating the Espionage Act of 1917 and Sedition Act of 1918 on the basis of their writings or statements. Benjamin Gitlow, a member of the Socialist Party of America, who had served in the New York State Assembly, was charged with criminal anarchy under New York's Criminal Anarchy Law of 1902 for publishing in July 1919 a document called "Left wing manifesto" in The Revolutionary Age, a newspaper for which he served as business manager. Gitlow's trial counsel was renowned defense attorney Clarence Darrow. His trial lasted from January 22 to February 5, 1920.

His defense contended that the Manifesto represented historical analysis rather than advocacy. Moreover, he claimed that he should not be arrested for his writing since the manifesto's distribution was not the inciting incident for any actions against the government. The prosecution refuted Gitlow's claim, stating, "Prosecutions have been for the use of words or printed arguments urging actions which if carried out by the reader or hearer would have resulted in the commission of a crime." The prosecution claimed that the Manifesto's intent was to convince American readers to commit crimes, and that in itself should be punishable by law. It took the jury three hours to convict Gitlow on February 11, 1920, and sentenced to 5 to 10 years in prison. He served more than two years at Sing Sing prison before his motion to appeal was granted and he was released on bail. State courts of appeal upheld his conviction.

Gitlow was the first major First Amendment case that the American Civil Liberties Union argued before the Supreme Court.

The Court had to consider whether it could review a challenge to a state law on the basis that it violated the federal constitution. If it determined that such a challenge lay within the scope of its authority, then it had to review the application of the law to the case at hand, the specific violation of the statute.

== Supreme Court ruling ==
=== Free speech ===
The Supreme Court upheld Gitlow's conviction 7–2, with Louis Brandeis and Oliver W. Holmes dissenting on the grounds that even "indefinite" advocacy of overthrowing government should be protected speech.

The Court upheld Gitlow's conviction on the basis that the government may suppress or punish speech that directly advocates the unlawful overthrow of the government and it upheld the constitutionality of the state statute at issue, which made it a crime to advocate the duty, need, or appropriateness of overthrowing government by force or violence.

Justice Edward Terry Sanford's majority opinion attempted to define more clearly the "clear and present danger" test developed a few years earlier in Schenck v. United States. He embraced "the bad tendency test" found in Shaffer v. United States, which held that a "State may punish utterances endangering the foundations of government and threatening its overthrow by unlawful means" because such speech clearly "present[s] a sufficient danger to the public peace and to the security of the State."

According to Sanford, a "single revolutionary spark may kindle a fire that, smoldering for a time, may burst into a sweeping and destructive conflagration." He said the Manifesto contained "the language of direct incitement" and was not "the expression of philosophical abstraction." Relying on the argument that incendiary speech may be suppressed “preemptively” Justice Sanford asserted that governments cannot be required to wait until revolutionary publications “lead to actual disturbances of the public peace or imminent and immediate danger of its own destruction” but can “suppress the threatened danger in its incipiency” or “extinguish the spark without waiting until it has enkindled the flame or blazed into the conflagration.”

In his dissent, Holmes, the author of Schenck's clear and present danger test, wrote that he believed it was still the appropriate test to employ in judging the limits of freedom of expression. Joined by Brandeis, he argued that Gitlow presented no present danger because only a small minority of people shared the views presented in the manifesto and because it directed an uprising at some "indefinite time in the future." Moreover, he responded to Sanford's kindling metaphor by refuting the claim that the Manifesto is an example of "incitement."

Holmes states, "It is said that this manifesto was more than a theory, that it was an incitement. Every idea is an incitement. It offers itself for belief and if believed it is acted on unless some other belief outweighs it or some failure of energy stifles the movement at its birth. The only difference between an expression of opinion and an incitement in the narrower sense is the speaker's enthusiasm for the result. Eloquence may set fire to reason, but, whatever may be thought of the redundant discourse before us, it had no chance of starting a present conflagration. If, in the long run, the beliefs expressed in proletarian dictatorship are destined to be accepted by the dominant forces of the community, the only meaning of free speech is that they should be given their chance and have their way."

=== Incorporation ===
The Supreme Court previously held, in Barron v. Baltimore, that the Constitution's Bill of Rights applied only to the federal government, that states were free to enforce statutes that restricted the rights enumerated in the Bill of Rights, and that the federal courts could not interfere with the enforcement of such statutes. Gitlow v. New York partly reversed that precedent and began a trend toward its near complete reversal. The Supreme Court now holds that almost every provision of the Bill of Rights applies to both the federal government and the states, with the exception of the Third and Seventh Amendments, and the Fifth Amendment's grand jury provision.

The Supreme Court relied on the "due process clause" of the Fourteenth Amendment, which prohibits a state from depriving "any person of life, liberty, or property, without due process of law." The Court stated that "For present purposes we may and do assume that" the rights of freedom of speech and freedom of the press were "among the fundamental personal rights and 'liberties' protected by the due process clause of the Fourteenth Amendment from impairment by the states".

== Aftermath ==
On November 9, 1925, Gitlow surrendered to New York Authorities for transportation back to Sing Sing Prison to finish his sentence. On December 11, 1925, New York Gov. Al Smith pardoned him, saying that while Gitlow had been "properly and legally convicted", he needed to consider "whether or not he has been sufficiently punished for a political crime." He concluded that "no additional punishment would act as a deterrent to those who would preach an erroneous doctrine of Government." Gitlow was later briefly elected General Secretary of the American Communist Party in 1929.

The Court used the doctrine first enunciated in Gitlow in other cases, such as De Jonge v. Oregon, Wolf v. Colorado, and Gideon v. Wainwright, to extend the reach of the Bill of Rights. Constitutional scholars refer to this as the "incorporation doctrine," meaning that the Supreme Court has identified rights specified in the Bill of Rights and incorporated them into the liberties covered by the due process clause of the Fourteenth Amendment. In 2010, the Supreme Court ruled in McDonald v. Chicago that the 2nd Amendment Right to "keep and bear arms," for lawful purposes such as self-defense is both a fundamental and individual right of all law-abiding Citizens over 21 years of age and of sound mind as self-defense is the "central component" of the 2nd Amendment, and these Rights are "fully applicable" in all of the 50 States.
