= United States v. Valenzuela-Bernal =

- Supreme Court of the United States

Argued April 20, 1982 Decided July 2, 1982
- Full case name: United States v. Valenzuela-Bernal
- Citations: 458 U.S. 858 (more) 102 S. Ct. 3440; 73 L. Ed. 2d 1193; 1982 U.S. LEXIS 159; 50 U.S.L.W. 5108

Case history
- Prior: 647 F.2d 72 (9th Cir. 1981); cert. granted, 454 U.S. 963 (1981).

Holding
- Respondent cannot establish a violation of the Sixth Amendment, which guarantees a criminal defendant the right to compulsory process for obtaining witnesses "in his favor," merely by showing that deportation of the aliens deprived him of their testimony, nor can he establish a Fifth Amendment violation for lack of due process, as an absence of fairness is not made out by the Government's deportation of the witnesses here unless there is some explanation of how their testimony would have been favorable and material.

Court membership
- Chief Justice Warren E. Burger Associate Justices William J. Brennan Jr. · Byron White; Thurgood Marshall · Harry Blackmun; Lewis F. Powell Jr. · William Rehnquist; John P. Stevens · Sandra Day O'Connor

Case opinions
- Majority: Rehnquist, joined by Burger, White, Powell, Stevens
- Concurrence: Blackmun
- Concurrence: O'Connor
- Dissent: Brennan, joined by Marshall

Laws applied
- U.S. Const. amend. V, VI

United States v. Valenzuela-Bernal, 458 U.S. 858 (1982), is a United States Supreme Court case that determined the constitutionality of deporting aliens who might give testimony in criminal alien smuggling prosecutions. Because deporting alien witnesses might take away a testimony that would be both “material and favorable” to the defendant, it gives rise to a potential motion from the defense to dismiss the indictment under the Compulsory Process Clause of the Sixth Amendment and the Due Process Clause of the Fifth Amendment.

The Supreme Court held that because the defendant failed to make a “plausible suggestion that the deported aliens possessed any material evidence that was not merely cumulative of other evidence,” the District Court properly denied the respondent's motion to dismiss the indictment.

== Background ==
=== History of the Compulsory Process Clause ===
When the Bill of Rights was created, the Compulsory Process Clause of the Sixth Amendment was included to ensure that defendants in criminal cases have access to a fair trial. In order to receive a fair trial, the defendant has the right to present witnesses or evidence that would be beneficial to his case.

The first time the scope of the Compulsory Processes Clause was addressed was in 1807 by Chief Justice John Marshall in the case of United States v. Burr (C.C.D. Va. 1807). Aaron Burr, accused of treason, attempted to use a letter written to President Thomas Jefferson. The letter written by General James Wilkinson, was to be used to prevent a prosecution witness from being able to testify. Marshall warned that the right given by the compulsory process clause must be protected by the courts.

It was not addressed again until the Supreme Court's decision in Washington v. Texas. In Washington, four key elements of a defendant's guarantee of compulsory process were established. The defendant has a right to insist on witnesses who are capable to give testimony that is relevant, material, and favorable to the defense. This decision required the courts to acknowledge the right of the accused to present a defense.

The Clause was next examined by the Ninth Circuit in United States v. Mendez-Rodriguez (9th Cir. 1971). There, the defendant was indicted for transporting seven illegal aliens in violation of Section 1324(a)(2) of the Immigration and Nationality Act. The Federal government detained three of the Mexicans and deported the remaining four, a decision made by the United States Attorney's office, prior to the defendant's indictment. Mendez-Rodriguez testified that he was innocent because he did not know that the passengers in his car were illegal aliens. The District Court convicted Mendez-Rodriguez. However, in 1971, the Ninth Circuit, applying principles of Washington v. Texas, reversed and held that the government's decision to deport the four illegal aliens before obtaining a testimony not only violated the defendant's due process guarantee, but his compulsory process rights as well. This decision provided the prevailing attitude for cases involving illegal alien witnesses in relation to the compulsory process clause until the Supreme Court's decision in United States v. Valenzuela-Bernal. The “essential elements” stated in US v. Mendez-Rodriguez were also summarized by the Court of Appeals’ opinion in United States v. Valenzuela-Bernal.

=== Immigration law ===
In cases involving transporting illegal aliens, the alien is considered a witness to the alleged crime. While the defendant may want the alien to be questioned by the defense counsel and called to testify at trial before being deported, Immigration services wants to return the foreigner to their country immediately without being questioned. In these cases, the defendant can move to have the indictment dismissed because the government's action has deprived him of his Sixth Amendment right “to have compulsory process for obtaining witnesses in his favor.” The executive, then, “must faithfully execute the immigration policy adopted by Congress, but it must also ensure that the criminal defendant receives the fundamental fairness inherent in due process.”

=== Trial proceedings ===
Valenzuela-Bernal, a citizen of Mexico, was arrested for transporting an illegal alien, Romero-Morales, in violation of section 1324(a)(2) of the Immigration and Nationality Act. This section “prohibits the knowing transportation of an alien illegally in the United States who last entered the country within three years prior to the date of the transportation.” Valenzuela-Bernal agreed to drive himself and five other passengers to Los Angeles. However, they were apprehended when they reached the checkpoint in Temecula. The three illegal-aliens were taken into custody and questioned by border patrol agents and not the United States Attorney. The government believed that none of the aliens offered any evidence that would have been “material and favorable” to the defendant. Valenzuela-Bernal attempted to dismiss the indictment on the grounds that the deportation of the illegal alien witnesses violated his Fifth Amendment right to Due Process and his Sixth Amendment right to call witnesses in formation of his defense. However, his motion was rejected.

=== Appeals ===
When the Ninth Circuit reviewed the indictment, it was dismissed based on the two elements used in US v. Mendez-Rodriguez: “government action denied the defendant access to a witness, and there was a loss of benefit to the defendant from the missing witness’s testimony.” The Justice Department retaliated by taking the case to the Supreme Court. They first argued that making “a reasonable good faith determination that the witnesses possess no material exculpatory evidence” allows them to deport alien witnesses without violating the rights mentioned in the fifth and sixth amendments. Their alternate position was that the defendant has to show how the deported witness could have provided material evidence in his favor in order to dismiss the indictment on grounds that his compulsory process rights were violated.

The court was faced with the challenge of finding a balance between a defendant's right to compulsory process and the government's interests in the immediate deportation of illegal alien witnesses.

== Opinion of the Court ==
Justice Rehnquist delivered the opinion of the Court. He stated,

The responsibility of the Executive Branch faithfully to execute the immigration policy adopted by Congress justifies the prompt deportation of illegal-alien witnesses upon the Executive's good-faith determination that they possess no evidence favorable to the defendant in a criminal prosecution. The mere fact that the Government deports such witnesses is not sufficient to establish a violation of the Compulsory Process Clause of the Sixth Amendment or the Due Process Clause of the Fifth Amendment. A violation of these provisions requires some showing that the evidence lost would be both material and favorable to the defense.

The Court decided to reverse the decision made by the Court of Appeals and to dismiss the indictment. The majority, seven, voted for the United States, while only two voted against it. “The Justice Department successfully argued before the court that the clause must be interpreted narrowly if a “proper and reasonable” balance is to be struck between the duties of the federal government, the interests of the criminal defendant, and the concerns of the alien witness.” The court concluded that in order to establish a violation of the compulsory process clause, the defendant must show that “The testimony of the deported witness would have been material and favorable to his defense in ways not merely cumulative to testimony of available witnesses.” Unless the defendant is able to do this, the indictment should not be dismissed.

In this case the respondent made no effort to explain what material, favorable evidence the deported passengers would have provided for his defense. Under the principles set forth today, he therefore failed to establish a violation of the Fifth or Sixth Amendment, and the District Court did not err in denying his motion to dismiss the indictment. Accordingly, the judgment of the Court of Appeals is Reversed.

In weighing the balance between government interests and the compulsory process rights of the defendant, the Court found that the government, rather than the defendant, was capable of determining whether or not the alien witness could provide evidence material to the defense before ordering the witness's deportation. In order to argue a violation of rights in the fifth and sixth amendments, the defendant is now faced with the “burden” of proving that the witness's testimony would have been material and favorable without access to the witness. Ultimately, the judgment of the court favored the United States.

=== Blackmun's concurrence ===
Justice Blackmun concurred, stating, “At least a ‘plausible theory’ of how the testimony of the deported witnesses would be helpful to the defense must be offered. None was advanced here; therefore, the motion to dismiss the indictment was properly denied by the District Court.”

=== O'Connor's concurrence ===
Justice O’Connor also concurred, stating, “In the case before us, the respondent made no plausible suggestion that the deported aliens possessed any material evidence that was not merely cumulative of other evidence. Under the standard I have proposed, the District Court properly denied the respondent's motion to dismiss the indictment. Accordingly, I concur in the judgment of the Court.”

=== Dissenting opinion ===
Justice Brennan, joined by Justice Marshall, wrote a dissenting opinion. He believed that the decision of the Court contradicted itself.

The government has a duty to make sure that justice is done so all other responsibilities “must yield before the rights to which an accused is constitutionally entitled.”

== Subsequent developments ==
Although the Supreme Court was trying to attain a balance between the defendant's right to compulsory process and the government's interests in United States v. Valenzuela-Bernal, currently “federal districts are not following procedural practices that will attain this balance.”
