= Washington v. Texas =

- Supreme Court of the United States

Argued March 15–16, 1967 Decided June 12, 1967
- Full case name: Jackie Washington v. Texas
- Citations: 388 U.S. 14 (more) 87 S. Ct. 1920; 18 L. Ed. 2d 1019; 1967 U.S. LEXIS 1083

Case history
- Prior: Fuller v. State, 397 S.W.2d 434 (Tex. Crim. App. 1966); Washington v. State, 400 S.W.2d 756 (Tex. Crim. App. 1966); cert. granted, 385 U.S. 812 (1966).
- Subsequent: Washington v. State, 417 S.W.2d 278 (Tex. Crim. App. 1967)

Holding
- The Compulsory Process Clause is incorporated against the states. Under that Clause, the Texas law unconstitutionally bars defendants from obtaining witnesses in their favor because it blocks a "relevant and material" witness from testifying for the defense.

Court membership
- Chief Justice Earl Warren Associate Justices Hugo Black · William O. Douglas; Tom C. Clark · John M. Harlan II; William J. Brennan Jr. · Potter Stewart; Byron White · Abe Fortas

Case opinions
- Majority: Warren, joined by Black, Douglas, Clark, Brennan, Stewart, White, Fortas
- Concurrence: Harlan

Laws applied
- Compulsory Process Clause

Washington v. Texas, 388 U.S. 14 (1967), is a United States Supreme Court case in which the Court decided that the Compulsory Process Clause of the Sixth Amendment to the Constitution (guaranteeing the right of a criminal defendant to force the attendance of witnesses for their side) is applicable in state courts as well as federal courts. Jackie Washington had attempted to call his co-defendant as a witness, but was blocked by Texas courts because state law prevented co-defendants from testifying for each other, under the theory that they would be likely to lie for each other on the stand.

The Supreme Court reasoned that the Due Process Clause of the Fourteenth Amendment made the right to be able to compel defense witnesses to testify necessary for a defendant's "due process" rights to fair proceedings, which applies to the states. Only Justice John Marshall Harlan II parted from the Court's "due process" focus, though he agreed with the outcome, as he regularly did in cases involving whether to apply federal rights to state courts.

The impact of Washington was narrowed by a later case, Taylor v. Illinois (1988), in which the Court said that "countervailing public interests", like the need to move through cases quickly, could be balanced against a defendant's right to present witnesses. In Taylor, the Supreme Court upheld a judge's order blocking defense witnesses from testifying due to the defense attorney's deliberate failure to disclose evidence to prosecutors earlier in the trial. The defense attorney's actions resulted in a lengthy delay in the proceedings which the trial judge felt was unjustified. Legal scholars have seen this new grant of discretion to trial judges as a change to relying on "efficient justice", a more limited vision of trial rights than the "right to present a defense" created in Washington.

== Background ==
=== History of Compulsory Process Clause jurisprudence ===
==== Ratification of the Sixth Amendment ====
The Compulsory Process Clause was ratified as part of the Sixth Amendment to the United States Constitution in the Bill of Rights in 1791. It accords a criminal defendant "the right ... to have compulsory process for obtaining witnesses in his favor." The Clause was included among other rights (e.g. right to a notice of charges) as a foundation for how federal criminal justice would operate. Originally, the Sixth Amendment was only applicable to the federal government.

Despite ratification of the Clause, compulsory process was not originally interpreted to permit co-defendants to testify for each other. States relied on a fear that two defendants would both "swear the other [out]" of the charge to prevent either defendant from being convicted. In Benson v. United States (1892), the Supreme Court explained the underlying common law theory for this prohibition; namely, that only witnesses who were "unaffected as a party by the result, and free from any of the temptations of interest" could testify. Federal courts accepted these common law rules and expressly applied them in United States v. Reid (1852). In Reid, the Court held that the common law pertaining to criminal procedure in force at the time of the Constitution's ratification would be applied in federal courts; this effectively kept the bar on co-defendant testimony. While Reid was overruled on different grounds in 1918, it stated the general practice for co-defendants as witnesses that existed before the Fourteenth Amendment.

==== Application to the States ====
After the passage of the Fourteenth Amendment in 1868, the Supreme Court dealt with a series of cases regarding the scope of that amendment's Due Process Clause. This Clause says that "Nor shall any State deprive any person of life, liberty, or property without due process of law". The Court initially rejected an argument that the Due Process Clause applied to the state governments in Hurtado v. California (1884), a case concerning the right to a grand jury hearing. Justice Matthews, writing for the majority of the Court, reasoned that "the Amendment prescribing due process of law is too vague and indefinite to operate as a practical restraint." While this decision rejected an expanded reach of the Due Process Clause, the Court stated that the Clause did protect against state encroachment on "fundamental principles of liberty and justice which lie at the base of all our civil and political institutions".

Hurtado left open the question of what "fundamental principles of liberty and justice" would be protected. In 1897, the Court held in Chicago, Burlington & Quincy Railroad v. Chicago (1897) that the Fifth Amendment's Just Compensation Clause relating to eminent domain takings was "an essential element of due process of law ordained by the Fourteenth Amendment" to the point that a Chicago taking of railroad property was "within the meaning of that amendment". In finding that application of the Due Process Clause, the Court said that just compensation constituted "a vital principle of republican institutions [without which] almost all other rights would become worthless".

In the same year as the railroad takings case, the Court evaluated what procedural trial rights implicated the "fundamental principles of liberty" expressed in Hurtado. In Hovey v. Elliot, the Supreme Court specifically applied the Due Process Clause to some fair trial guarantees, holding that due process "secures an 'inherent right of defense'". Despite that broad statement, the Court emphasized that due to procedural issues with the case itself "our opinion is therefore exclusively confined to the case before us."

A decade after Hovey, the Supreme Court announced its first rule for how the Due Process Clause of the Fourteenth Amendment would be applied. In Twining v. New Jersey (1908), the Court held that "it is possible that some of the personal rights safeguarded by the first eight amendments against National action may also be safeguarded against state action, because a denial of them would be a denial of due process of law". This understanding of the meaning of "due process" opened up the possibility that the Bill of Rights could be applied to the states. Specifically, the Court said in Twining that the test was whether the right was embedded in "the very idea of free government". This test endorsed a "selective incorporation" approach, meaning one that would evaluate whether to apply a right to the states on a case-by-case basis.

The selective incorporation principle was expanded on further in Palko v. Connecticut (1937), where the Court examined whether the right against double jeopardy should be incorporated against the states. In Palko, the Court stated that specific guarantees in the Bill of Rights could be applied to the states if the right was "found to be implicit in the concept of ordered liberty". Though eight justices agreed that the double jeopardy right was not "implicit in the concept of ordered liberty", the Palko test has remained the standard for incorporating rights against state and local governments.

==== Expansion of procedural trial rights ====
After Palko, the Court examined Bill of Rights protections one by one. Despite this incremental approach, the Court would eventually apply most rights to the states.

In the realm of criminal procedure, this doctrine eventually came to protect the defendant's ability to "present exculpatory evidence and testimony of witnesses". For example, the Court in Brady v. Maryland (1963) used the Due Process Clause to require the state prosecution authorities to disclose evidence that is favorable to a defendant prior to trial.

The Court's due process jurisprudence was expanded with the 1948 decision in In re Oliver, which revised the breadth of the "fundamental fairness" right. The Court wrote:

A person's right to reasonable notice of a charge against him, and an opportunity to be heard in his defense—a right to his day in court—are basic in our system of jurisprudence; and these rights include, as a minimum, a right to examine the witnesses against him, to offer testimony, and to be represented by counsel.

=== Washington's trial ===
Jackie Washington was charged with first-degree murder in Dallas. At the trial, Washington testified on his own behalf, and he put a great deal of the blame on an accomplice named Charles Fuller. He testified that Fuller had been carrying the murder weapon—a shotgun—at the scene. When he sought to have Fuller testify to back up his story, the trial judge blocked him on the basis of a Texas statute which provided that "persons charged or convicted as co-participants in the same crime could not testify for one another". The law, however, did not block a co-participant from testifying for the state.

Washington was convicted and sentenced to 50 years in prison. His conviction was subsequently upheld by the Texas Court of Criminal Appeals, Texas's highest criminal court, in 1966. The Court of Criminal Appeals, which reasoned that the Compulsory Process Clause did not affect how the state treated the "competency" of a witness, rejected Washington's plea that Fuller should have been allowed to testify. Washington then petitioned the U.S. Supreme Court to hear his case, and the Supreme Court granted review.

== Opinion of the Court ==
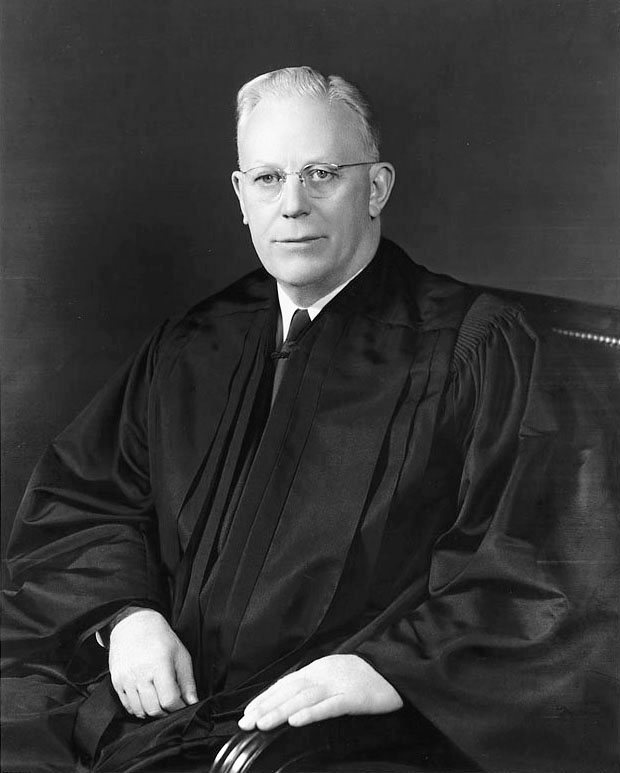
Chief Justice Earl Warren wrote the majority opinion in Washington.

Chief Justice Earl Warren wrote the opinion of the Court, which spoke for eight justices in reversing the Texas Court of Criminal Appeals. Warren began by stating that the Court had never been "previously called upon to decide whether the right of the accused to have compulsory process for obtaining witnesses in his favor ... is so fundamental [that] it is incorporated in the Due Process Clause". Because of the incorporation to states of other procedural guarantees, the "right to offer the testimony of witnesses" could be given no less weight. Warren wrote that it was critical to the ability to "present a defense ... [a] defendant's version of the facts". This broad right was necessary to detail thoroughly, he wrote, because ignoring how the right would actually be applied would risk making the right to compel witnesses futile.

After determining that the Sixth Amendment's "right to compulsory process is applicable in this state proceeding" (i.e. that the Compulsory Process Clause applied to the states), the question became whether the specific instance of Washington's trial was an unconstitutional deprivation of that right. Despite the common law restriction against co-defendants testifying for each other, Warren noted that federal courts had refused to be "bound by 'the dead hand of the common-law'" since 1918. Along with the precedent of prior federal court decisions, the fact that there were a great deal of exceptions to this rule demonstrated the "absurdity of the rule" itself. Specifically, under the Texas statute—which allowed a defendant acquitted at a separate trial to testify for the other defendant at the other's trial—the "law leaves [the co-defendant] free to testify when he has a great incentive to perjury, [but] bars his testimony in situations where he has a lesser motive to lie".

Warren concluded that the nature of the Texas law at issue denied Washington the right for a fair trial using witnesses who could testify to "relevant and material" facts in the case. Here, while not entirely relying on the finding, the Court saw the law as "arbitrary" because its discrimination between the prosecution and defense served "no rational relationship" to any goal of preventing perjury. Further, the idea that a "competent" witness was barred from testifying, in and of itself, was held to be an unconstitutional predetermination on the part of the state legislature. The Court's decision upheld the importance of juries in evaluating the truth and credibility of witnesses' statements.

Despite adopting a broad principle, the Court did not list any specific rules for how trial judges were to balance evidentiary standards and the right of the defendant to secure witnesses in his or her favor.

=== Harlan's concurrence ===
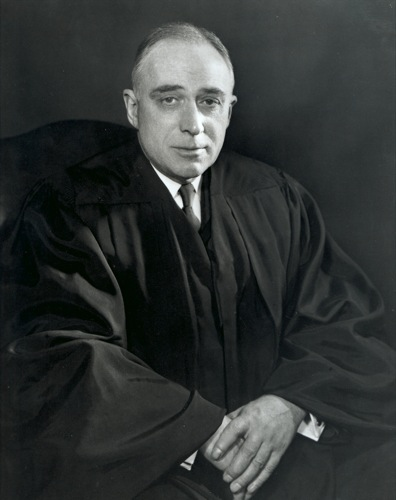
Associate Justice John Marshall Harlan II wrote a separate concurring opinion in Washington.

Justice Harlan, who agreed with the decision to reverse the Texas court's judgment but not with the majority's reasoning, wrote a short separate concurring opinion. He repeated his position that the Due Process Clause did not incorporate the Bill of Rights to the states; rather, the Due Process Clause was a "rational continuum, which, broadly speaking, includes a freedom from all substantial arbitrary impositions and purposeless restraints". He isolated the Texas law's distinction between the co-defendant testifying for the state while being barred from testifying for the defendant as having "no justification". Thus, he rejected holding the trial unconstitutional on Compulsory Process Clause grounds; he argued instead that the State's "arbitrary bar" against a criminal defendant's calling a co-defendant as a witness for his side, while allowing the co-defendant to testify for the prosecution, violated the Due Process Clause.

== Subsequent developments ==
In two cases after Washington, the Court pulled back from its broad principle that a defendant in a criminal proceeding has a "right to a defense". In United States v. Valenzuela-Bernal (1982), the Court held that an argument by the government that it had an interest in deporting illegal aliens (some witnesses in the case) outweighed the defendant's right to "eye witness testimony". Additionally, in Taylor v. Illinois (1988), the Court held that "countervailing public interests" could also outweigh the defendant's compulsory process rights.

In Taylor, a series of deliberate discovery violations by the defense counsel at trial led the trial judge to block attempts at postponing proceedings to allow a further undisclosed defense witness the chance to testify; the judge had held that there must be some sanction against the defense for their failure to disclose witnesses earlier in the case. A divided Court upheld the trial judge's preclusion of the witness, adding a new framework for balancing a defendant's right to a robust defense with a series of other factors. Namely, the new framework required looking at the state's interest in "efficient" justice, the state's interest in excluding evidence lacking integrity, the state's interest in a strong judicial authority with followed rules, and the prosecution interest in avoiding prejudice due to a defendant's discovery violation.

== Analysis and commentary ==
Analysis of Washington has focused on the decision in the broader context of procedural trial rights. A 2007 article in the Georgetown Law Review by Martin Hewett was critical of the decision. Hewett's main criticism was based on the Court's lack of a standard on which to evaluate whether certain evidence was "material" to a defendant's case. Hewett noted that in a post-Washington decision in 1973, the Court applied a "case-specific" decision rather than a "general constitutional standard". This line of decisions, Hewett argued, led to a standard which allows a trial judge the authority to determine the "actual reliability of the evidence" in cases where a witness is not present. The "newly-seized power" was limited to the cases at hand in a manner which suggested the ambiguous calculus the Court was using was flawed. This vagueness in the standard came from cases where the "situations [involved] the reliability of the excluded evidence [that] could factfinder". Hewett concluded by arguing that all of these cases had diminished the protections of the jury and of the defendant's right to have his own defense.

An article in the American Criminal Law Review, published in 2011 by Stacey Kime, disagreed with some of Hewett's arguments. Kime argued that "it is well settled that criminal defendants have a constitutional right to present exculpatory evidence", disagreeing with the idea that the basis for a robust defense had been gutted. Instead, she blamed the "incoherent" standard today on a lack of understanding of where the "source of this constitutional right" to have a strong defense lies. Unlike Hewett, who targeted post-Washington decisions, Kime believed that there were flaws in the Washington opinion itself. Specifically, she argued that "the Court's reasoning was not only unnecessary, but the Washington doctrine itself is inconsistent with the Sixth Amendment's history and text".

In her review of the history behind the Sixth Amendment, Kime argued that James Madison could have drafted a more comprehensive right to "call for evidence" (as existed in the Virginia Declaration of Rights) but failed to do so. With this context in mind, she said, the Compulsory Process Clause likely enshrined the right to subpoena witnesses and have a fair trial, rather than a broader "right to have a defense". Kime's analysis concluded by stating that the decision in Washington had put "unnecessary tension between two analytically distinct constitutional rights".
