= List of United States Supreme Court cases, volume 268 =

Supreme Court of the United States
- Interactive map of Supreme Court of the United States
- 38°53′26″N 77°00′16″W
- Established: March 4, 1789; 236 years ago
- Location: Washington, D.C.
- Coordinates: 38°53′26″N 77°00′16″W
- Composition method: Presidential nomination with Senate confirmation
- Authorised by: Constitution of the United States, Art. III, § 1
- Judge term length: life tenure, subject to impeachment and removal
- Number of positions: 9 (by statute)
- Website: supremecourt.gov

This is a list of cases reported in volume 268 of United States Reports, decided by the Supreme Court of the United States in 1925.

== Justices of the Supreme Court at the time of volume 268 U.S. ==
The Supreme Court is established by Article III, Section 1 of the Constitution of the United States, which says: "The judicial Power of the United States, shall be vested in one supreme Court . . .". The size of the Court is not specified; the Constitution leaves it to Congress to set the number of justices. Under the Judiciary Act of 1789 Congress originally fixed the number of justices at six (one chief justice and five associate justices). Since 1789 Congress has varied the size of the Court from six to seven, nine, ten, and back to nine justices (always including one chief justice).

When the cases in volume 268 were decided the Court comprised the following nine members:

Portrait	Justice	Office	Home State	Succeeded	Date confirmed by the Senate (Vote)	Tenure on Supreme Court
	William Howard Taft	Chief Justice	Connecticut	Edward Douglass White	June 30, 1921 (Acclamation)	July 11, 1921 – February 3, 1930 (Retired)
	Oliver Wendell Holmes Jr.	Associate Justice	Massachusetts	Horace Gray	December 4, 1902 (Acclamation)	December 8, 1902 – January 12, 1932 (Retired)
	Willis Van Devanter	Associate Justice	Wyoming	Edward Douglass White (as Associate Justice)	December 15, 1910 (Acclamation)	January 3, 1911 – June 2, 1937 (Retired)
	James Clark McReynolds	Associate Justice	Tennessee	Horace Harmon Lurton	August 29, 1914 (44–6)	October 12, 1914 – January 31, 1941 (Retired)
	Louis Brandeis	Associate Justice	Massachusetts	Joseph Rucker Lamar	June 1, 1916 (47–22)	June 5, 1916 – February 13, 1939 (Retired)
	George Sutherland	Associate Justice	Utah	John Hessin Clarke	September 5, 1922 (Acclamation)	October 2, 1922 – January 17, 1938 (Retired)
	Pierce Butler	Associate Justice	Minnesota	William R. Day	December 21, 1922 (61–8)	January 2, 1923 – November 16, 1939 (Died)
	Edward Terry Sanford	Associate Justice	Tennessee	Mahlon Pitney	January 29, 1923 (Acclamation)	February 19, 1923 – March 8, 1930 (Died)
	Harlan F. Stone	Associate Justice	New York	Joseph McKenna	February 5, 1925 (71–6)	March 2, 1925 – July 2, 1941 (Continued as chief justice)

== Notable Cases in 268 U.S. ==
=== Linder v. United States ===
Linder v. United States, 268 U.S. 5 (1925), involved the applicability of the Harrison Act. The Harrison Act was originally a taxing measure on drugs such as morphine and cocaine, but later effectively became a prohibition on such drugs. The Act, however, had a provision exempting doctors who prescribed the drugs. Dr. Charles Linder prescribed the drugs to addicts in Oklahoma, which the federal government said was not a legitimate medical practice. He was prosecuted and convicted. Linder appealed, and the Supreme Court overturned his conviction, holding that the federal government in this case had overstepped its power to regulate medicine.

=== Pierce v. Society of Sisters ===
In Pierce v. Society of Sisters, 268 U.S. 510 (1925), the Supreme Court overturned an Oregon statute requiring children to attend only public schools. The decision significantly expanded coverage of the Due Process Clause of the Fourteenth Amendment to the United States Constitution to recognize personal civil liberties. The decision has been cited as a precedent in numerous later cases. The right of parents to control their children's education without state interference became a "cause célèbre" following the case, and religious groups still defend this right from state encroachment.

=== Gitlow v. New York ===
Gitlow v. New York, 268 U.S. 652 (1925), is a landmark decision, in which the Supreme Court held that the Fourteenth Amendment to the United States Constitution had extended the First Amendment's provisions protecting freedom of speech and freedom of the press to apply to the governments of U.S. states. Along with Chicago, Burlington & Quincy Railroad Co. v. City of Chicago (1897), it was one of the first major cases involving the incorporation of the Bill of Rights. It was also one of a series of Supreme Court cases that defined the scope of the First Amendment's protection of free speech, and established the standard to which a state or the federal government would be held when it criminalized speech or writing.

== Citation style ==
Under the Judiciary Act of 1789 the federal court structure at the time comprised District Courts, which had general trial jurisdiction; Circuit Courts, which had mixed trial and appellate (from the US District Courts) jurisdiction; and the United States Supreme Court, which had appellate jurisdiction over the federal District and Circuit courts—and for certain issues over state courts. The Supreme Court also had limited original jurisdiction (i.e., in which cases could be filed directly with the Supreme Court without first having been heard by a lower federal or state court). There were one or more federal District Courts and/or Circuit Courts in each state, territory, or other geographical region.

The Judiciary Act of 1891 created the United States Courts of Appeals and reassigned the jurisdiction of most routine appeals from the district and circuit courts to these appellate courts. The Act created nine new courts that were originally known as the "United States Circuit Courts of Appeals." The new courts had jurisdiction over most appeals of lower court decisions. The Supreme Court could review either legal issues that a court of appeals certified or decisions of court of appeals by writ of certiorari. On January 1, 1912, the effective date of the Judicial Code of 1911, the old Circuit Courts were abolished, with their remaining trial court jurisdiction transferred to the U.S. District Courts.

Bluebook citation style is used for case names, citations, and jurisdictions.

- "# Cir." = United States Court of Appeals
  - e.g., "3d Cir." = United States Court of Appeals for the Third Circuit
- "D." = United States District Court for the District of . . .
  - e.g.,"D. Mass." = United States District Court for the District of Massachusetts
- "E." = Eastern; "M." = Middle; "N." = Northern; "S." = Southern; "W." = Western
  - e.g.,"M.D. Ala." = United States District Court for the Middle District of Alabama
- "Ct. Cl." = United States Court of Claims
- The abbreviation of a state's name alone indicates the highest appellate court in that state's judiciary at the time.
  - e.g.,"Pa." = Supreme Court of Pennsylvania
  - e.g.,"Me." = Supreme Judicial Court of Maine

== List of cases in volume 268 U.S. ==
Case Name	Page and year	Opinion of the Court	Concurring opinion(s)	Dissenting opinion(s)	Lower Court	Disposition
Oliver v. United States	1 (1925)	McReynolds	none	none	9th Cir.	affirmed
Linder v. United States	5 (1925)	McReynolds	none	none	9th Cir.	reversed
Alaska Steamship Company v. McHugh	23 (1925)	McReynolds	none	none	9th Cir.	certification
New York Central Railroad Company v. Chisholm	29 (1925)	McReynolds	none	none	1st Cir.	certification
Doullut and Williams Company, Inc. v. United States	33 (1925)	McReynolds	none	none	E.D. La.	reversed
Baltimore and Ohio Railroad Company v. City of Parkersburg	35 (1925)	Brandeis	none	none	4th Cir.	reversed
Northern Pacific Railroad Company v. Washington Department of Public Works	39 (1925)	Brandeis	none	none	Wash.	reversed
Mid-Northern Oil Company v. Walker	45 (1925)	Sutherland	none	none	Mont.	affirmed
Nampa and Meridian Irrigation District v. Bond	50 (1925)	Sutherland	none	none	9th Cir.	affirmed
Duffy v. Central Railroad Company of New Jersey	55 (1925)	Sutherland	none	none	3d Cir.	reversed
Industrial Association of San Francisco v. United States	64 (1925)	Sutherland	none	none	N.D. Cal.	reversed
Barrett v. Van Pelt	85 (1925)	Butler	none	none	N.Y. Sup. Ct.	reversed
Central Union Trust Company v. Anderson County	93 (1925)	Butler	none	none]	S.D. Tex.	reversed
United States v. Flannery	98 (1925)	Sanford	none	none	Ct. Cl.	reversed
McCaughn v. Ludington	106 (1925)	Sanford	none	none	3d Cir.	reversed
New Mexico v. Colorado	108 (1925)	per curiam	none	none	original	boundary set
May v. Henderson	111 (1925)	Stone	none	none	9th Cir.	reversed
United States v. Dunn	121 (1925)	Stone	none	none	8th Cir.	multiple
Stebbins v. Riley	137 (1925)	Stone	none	none	Cal.	affirmed
Standard Oil Company of New Jersey v. Southern Pacific Company	146 (1925)	Butler	none	none	2d Cir.	affirmed
Irwin v. Gavit	161 (1925)	Holmes	none	Sutherland	2d Cir.	reversed
St. Louis, Brownsville and Mexico Railway Company v. United States	169 (1925)	Brandeis	none	none	Ct. Cl.	multiple
Yee Hem v. United States	178 (1925)	Sutherland	none	none	N.D. Ohio	affirmed
Reading Steel Casting Company v. United States	186 (1925)	Butler	none	none	E.D. Pa.	reversed
Shafer v. Farmers Grain Company	189 (1925)	VanDevanter	none	none	D.N.D.	affirmed
Alpha Portland Cement Company v. Massachusetts	203 (1925)	McReynolds	none	none	Mass.	reversed
United States v. Johnston	220 (1925)	Holmes	none	none	2d Cir.	reversed
Colorado v. Toll	228 (1925)	Holmes	none	none	D. Colo.	reversed
Southern Utilities Company v. City of Palatka	232 (1925)	Holmes	none	none	Fla.	affirmed
United States Fidelity and Guaranty Company v. Wooldridge	234 (1925)	Holmes	none	none	5th Cir.	affirmed
Lewellyn v. Frick	238 (1925)	Holmes	none	none	W.D. Pa.	affirmed
Oklahoma v. Texas	252 (1925)	VanDevanter	none	none	original	multiple
Cockrill v. California	258 (1925)	Butler	none	none	Cal. Ct. App.	affirmed
Southern Pacific Company v. United States	263 (1925)	Sanford	none	none	Ct. Cl.	reversed
Western Pacific Railroad Company v. United States	271 (1925)	Sanford	none	none	Ct. Cl.	reversed
North Laramie Land Company v. Hoffman	276 (1925)	Stone	none	none	Wyo.	affirmed
North Carolina Railroad Company v. Story	288 (1925)	Taft	none	none	N.C.	reversed
Coronado Coal Company v. United Mine Workers of America	295 (1925)	Taft	none	none	8th Cir.	multiple
Fernandez v. Phillips	311 (1925)	Holmes	none	none	D.N.H.	affirmed
Davis v. Pringle	315 (1925)	Holmes	none	none	multiple	multiple
Weller v. New York	319 (1925)	McReynolds	none	none	N.Y. Ct. Spec. Sess.	affirmed
Real Silk Hosiery Mills v. City of Portland	325 (1925)	McReynolds	none	none	9th Cir.	reversed
Cheung Sum Shee v. Nagle	336 (1925)	McReynolds	none	none	9th Cir.	certification
Chang Chan v. Nagle	346 (1925)	McReynolds	none	none	9th Cir.	certification
Benedict v. Ratner	353 (1925)	Brandeis	none	none	2d Cir.	reversed
Missouri Pacific Railroad Company v. Reynolds-Davis Grocery Company	366 (1925)	Brandeis	none	none	Ark.	affirmed
Sherwin v. United States	369 (1925)	Brandeis	none	none	5th Cir.	affirmed
Ray Consolidated Copper Company v. United States	373 (1925)	Brandeis	none	none	Ct. Cl.	affirmed
United States v. Dickey	378 (1925)	Sutherland	none	none	W.D. Mo.	affirmed
United States v. Baltimore Post	388 (1925)	Sutherland	none	none	D. Md.	affirmed
United States ex rel. Rutz v. Levy	390 (1925)	Sutherland	none	none	N.D. Ohio	affirmed
United States v. Royer	394 (1925)	Sutherland	none	none	Ct. Cl.	affirmed
Realty Holding Company v. Donaldson	398 (1925)	Sutherland	none	none	E.D. Mich.	affirmed
Toyota v. United States	402 (1925)	Butler	none	none	1st Cir.	certification
Banton v. Belt Line Railway Corporation	413 (1925)	Butler	none	none	S.D.N.Y.	affirmed
Meek v. Centre County Banking Company	426 (1925)	Sanford	none	none	3d Cir.	reversed
Dumbra v. United States	435 (1925)	Stone	none	none	S.D.N.Y.	affirmed
Knewel v. Egan	442 (1925)	Stone	none	none	D.S.D.	reversed
Sowell v. Federal Reserve Bank of Dallas	449 (1925)	Stone	none	none	5th Cir.	affirmed
Edward Hines Yellow Pine Trustees v. Martin	458 (1925)	Stone	none	none	5th Cir.	affirmed
Selzman v. United States	466 (1925)	Taft	none	none	N.D. Ohio	affirmed
Cami v. Central Victoria, Ltd.	469 (1925)	Holmes	none	none	1st Cir.	affirmed
Frick v. Pennsylvania	473 (1925)	VanDevanter	none	none	Pa.	reversed
Miles v. Graham	501 (1925)	McReynolds	none	none	D. Md.	affirmed
Pierce v. Society of Sisters	510 (1925)	McReynolds	none	none	D. Or.	affirmed
Marr v. United States	536 (1925)	Brandeis	none	VanDevanter	Ct. Cl.	affirmed
United States v. Gulf Refining Company	542 (1925)	Butler	none	none	8th Cir.	affirmed
Second Russian Insurance Company v. Miller	552 (1925)	Stone	none	none	2d Cir.	affirmed
Maple Flooring Manufacturers' Association v. United States	563 (1925)	Stone	none	Taft; McReynolds	W.D. Mich.	reversed
Cement Manufacturers' Protective Association v. United States	588 (1925)	Stone	none	none	S.D.N.Y.	reversed
United States v. Fish	607 (1925)	Taft	none	none	Ct. Cust. App.	affirmed
United States v. Noce	613 (1925)	Taft	none	none	Ct. Cl.	reversed
Robertson v. Railroad Labor Board	619 (1925)	Brandeis	none	none	N.D. Ill.	reversed
Edwards v. Cuba Railroad Company	628 (1925)	Butler	none	none	S.D.N.Y.	affirmed
William Danzer and Company, Inc. v. Gulf and Ship Island Railroad Company	633 (1925)	Butler	none	none	S.D. Miss.	affirmed
Davis v. L.L. Cohen and Company, Inc.	638 (1925)	Sanford	none	none	Bristol Cnty. Super. Ct.	reversed
Lee v. Osceola and Little River Road Improvement District	643 (1925)	Sanford	none	none	Ark.	reversed
New York ex rel. Rosevale Realty Company v. Kleinert	646 (1925)	Sanford	none	none	N.Y. Sup. Ct.	dismissed
Gitlow v. New York	652 (1925)	Sanford	none	Holmes	N.Y. Sup. Ct.	affirmed
