= Pointer v. Texas =

- Supreme Court of the United States

Argued 15 March, 1965 Decided 5 April, 1965
- Full case name: Pointer v. Texas
- Citations: 380 U.S. 400 (more) 85 S. Ct. 1065; 13 L. Ed. 2d 923

Case history
- Prior: Pointer v. State, 375 S.W.2d 293 (Tex. Crim. App. 1963)

Holding
- Right to confront and cross-examine witnesses is fundamental under the Sixth Amendment and applies to state courts under the Fourteenth Amendment.

Court membership
- Chief Justice Earl Warren Associate Justices Hugo Black · William O. Douglas; Tom C. Clark · John M. Harlan II; William J. Brennan Jr. · Potter Stewart; Byron White · Arthur Goldberg

Case opinions
- Majority: Black, joined by Warren, Douglas, Clark, Brennan, White, Goldberg
- Concurrence: Harlan (in result)
- Concurrence: Stewart (in result)
- Concurrence: Goldberg

Laws applied
- U.S. Const. amends. VI, XIV

Pointer v. Texas, 380 U.S. 400 (1965), was a decision by the United States Supreme Court involving the application of the right of to confront accusers in state court proceedings. The Sixth Amendment in the Bill of Rights states that, in criminal prosecutions, the defendant has a right "...to be confronted with the witnesses against him; to have compulsory process for obtaining witnesses in his favor..." In this case, a person arrested in Texas for robbery was deprived of the ability to cross-examine a witness when the lower court allowed the introduction of a transcript of that witness's earlier testimony at a preliminary proceeding instead of compelling attendance by the witness at trial.

== Prior history ==
On the night of June 16, 1962 the manager of a 7-Eleven in Harris County, Texas was robbed of $375 (currently equivalent to $3991). The robber fled from the store but the store manager claimed to see him talking to another man at a nearby street intersection. Responding officers found an abandoned automobile with a flat tire and a still-warm engine at the intersection. A police dog tracked a scent from the car's front seat to the 7-11 store and then across the street, into a wooded area, and then to the front yard of a nearby house. There they found Bob Granville Pointer hiding in the shadow of a tree and arrested him. A search of Pointer recovered $81 in his wallet and $65 in his shoe.

At a preliminary hearing (called in Texas an "examining trial") was held. Examining trials have a prosecutor, defense and take place before a magistrate or district judge. Examining trials require the prosecutor to show the presiding officer that probable cause exists and determines if the accused will be granted bail and on what conditions. If the prosecutor demonstrates evidence supporting probable cause to believe the accused committed the charged act, then the accused is indicted.

In Pointer's examining trial the chief witness was the store manager, Kenneth W. Phillips. Phillips identified Pointer and testified that he had been robbed by Pointer at gunpoint and feared for his life. According to Article 1408 of the Texas Penal code in operation at the time, robbery with violence or "putting in fear of life or bodily injury" was punishable for terms of confinement of five years to life, no matter the amount. Pointer and co-defendant Lloyd Earl Dillard were not represented by any attorney in the hearing. Dillard asked Phillips a few questions but Pointer did not. The examining trial ended with indictments of both Pointer and Dillard.

After the examining trial, Phillips moved to California and did not return to Texas for Pointer's criminal trial in District Court. The prosecutor introduced the transcript of Phillips' testimony from the examining trial instead. Pointer's attorney objected to the inability to cross-examine Phillips but was overruled. The jury convicted Pointer and he was sentenced to life imprisonment.

On appeal to the Texas Court of Criminal Appeals, Pointer's attorney repeated the argument that Phillips' non-appearance deprived Pointer of his right to confront and cross-examine witnesses against him, as guaranteed by the Sixth Amendment. The Texas court held that Pointer could have cross-examined Phillips at the examining trial and chose not to. Considering the responsibility of a layperson like Pointer to carry out such a cross-examination without assistance, it further ruled that examining trials did not require counsel because they preceded indictment.

== Decision ==
Pointer's case was part of a series that defined how the Sixth Amendment applied to defendants in state courts. The Supreme Court took this case to decide if failure to appoint an attorney to represent Pointer at the preliminary hearing unconstitutionally denied him the assistance of counsel as it had then-recently decided in Gideon v. Wainwright, 372 U.S. 335 (1963). The Court was also concerned with the deprivation of the right to cross-examine witnesses, as it had referred to in In re Oliver, 333 U.S. 257 (1948). Earlier in the same term, the Court had defined the minimum rights under the Sixth Amendment as:

"In the constitutional sense, trial by jury in a criminal case necessarily implies at the very least that the `evidence developed' against a defendant shall come from the witness stand in a public courtroom where there is full judicial protection of the defendant's right of confrontation, of cross-examination, and of counsel."

— Justice Potter Stewart, Turner v. Louisiana, 379 U.S. 466 (1965)

Justice Hugo Black held that:

- The right of an accused under the Sixth Amendment to confront and cross-examine witnesses against them is a fundamental right

- This right is essential to a fair trial
- The Fourteenth Amendment makes this right obligatory on the States

- The introduction of the transcript was a clear denial of the right of confrontation and the statement was made without an adequate opportunity for cross-examination.

== Effects of the decision ==
Pointer's conviction was reversed and returned to Texas for further proceedings.

When Texas revised its Criminal Code, it changed the law on examining trials. It was now explicit that the hearing could proceed only after "...allowing the accused, however, sufficient time to procure counsel." Further, it also said "...the magistrate may appoint counsel to represent an accused in such examining trial only..."

This case was part of the process of applying rights guaranteed by the Sixth Amendment to the states. It was later cited by one of the most famous United States Supreme Court cases, Miranda v. Arizona, 384 U.S. 436 (1966).

== See also ==
- List of United States Supreme Court cases, volume 380
- List of United States Supreme Court cases
