= Linder v. United States =

- Supreme Court of the United States

Argued March 9, 1925 Decided April 13, 1925
- Full case name: Charles O. Linder v. United States
- Citations: 268 U.S. 5 (more) 45 S. Ct. 446; 69 L. Ed. 819; 1925 U.S. LEXIS 545

Case history
- Prior: From District Court, Eastern District of Washington

Court membership
- Chief Justice William H. Taft Associate Justices Oliver W. Holmes Jr. · Willis Van Devanter; James C. McReynolds · Louis Brandeis; George Sutherland · Pierce Butler; Edward T. Sanford · Harlan F. Stone

Case opinion
- Majority: McReynolds, joined by unanimous

Laws applied
- Harrison Narcotics Tax Act
- Superseded by
- Controlled Substances Act (in part)

Linder v. United States, 268 U.S. 5 (1925), is a Supreme Court case involving the applicability of the Harrison Act. The Harrison Act was originally a taxing measure on drugs such as morphine and cocaine, but it later effectively became a prohibition on such drugs. However, the Act had a provision exempting doctors prescribing the drugs. Dr. Charles O. Linder of Spokane, Washington prescribed the drugs to addicts, which the federal government said was not a legitimate medical practice. He was prosecuted and convicted. Linder appealed, and the Supreme Court unanimously overturned his conviction, holding that the federal government overstepped its power to regulate medicine. The opinion of the court was written by Justice James Clark McReynolds and states, "Obviously, direct control of medical practice in the states is beyond the power of the federal government."

== Current implication ==
With the passage of myriad later laws, including the Controlled Substances Act, which gives no exemption whatsoever to Schedule I drugs, and the end of Lochner era, the holding of Linder has now been mostly vitiated. However, the rationale of the case was later used to stop the Department of Justice from interfering with Oregon's assisted suicide laws in the case Gonzales v. Oregon, and the concurring opinion in Ruan v. United States noted that Linder has never been overturned, and would apply the rule to that case.

== See also ==
- List of United States Supreme Court cases, volume 268
