= Compulsory Process Clause =

Clause within the United States Constitution

The Compulsory Process Clause within the Sixth Amendment to the United States Constitution lets criminal case defendants attain witnesses in their favor by way of a court-ordered subpoena. The Clause is generally interpreted as letting defendants present their own case at trial, though several specific limitations have been placed by the Supreme Court of the United States since this rule began.

== Text ==
In all criminal prosecutions, the accused shall enjoy the right...to have compulsory process for obtaining witnesses in his favor.

== History ==
The Compulsory Process Clause was part of the Sixth Amendment, which was ratified in 1791. Between ratification and the Fourteenth Amendment, there were very limited instances in which a court dealt with compulsory process. One important example is the trial of Vice President Aaron Burr, where Burr tried to subpoena documents from the President in order to sustain his defense. Though the case was heard in Federal Circuit Court the presiding judge was Chief Justice John Marshall who ordered the papers be issued, invoking the Sixth Amendment.

After the passage of the Fourteenth Amendment in 1868, the Supreme Court dealt with a series of cases regarding the guarantees offered by the Due Process Clause. The first case to evaluate the procedural trial rights of defendants in terms of the Due Process Clause was the 1897 decision in Hovey v. Elliot. In Hovey, the Supreme Court specifically applied the Due Process Clause to fair trial guarantees, holding that due process "secures an 'inherent right of defense'". This doctrine eventually came to protect the defendant's ability to "present exculpatory evidence and testimony of witnesses". For example, the Court in Brady v. Maryland used the Due Process Clause to require the prosecution in criminal proceedings to disclose evidence that is favorable to the defendant prior to a trial.

The Court's due process jurisprudence was expanded with the 1948 decision in In re Oliver which revised the breadth of the fundamental fairness doctrine. The Court wrote:

A person's right to reasonable notice of a charge against him, and an opportunity to be heard in his defense—a right to his day in court—are basic in our system of jurisprudence; and these rights include, as a minimum, a right to examine the witnesses against him, to offer testimony, and to be represented by counsel.

In Washington v. Texas (1967), the Supreme Court held that the Clause barred a state law that made persons charged or convicted as co-participants in a common crime incompetent to testify on behalf of one another. This was a holding based on the Due Process Clause, a departure from the Oliver cases. Chief Justice Earl Warren, who wrote the majority opinion, stated that compulsory process was critical to the very ability to "present a defense...[a] defendant's version of the facts". This broad right was necessary to note as its absence would make the right to compel witnesses futile.

However, in Taylor v. Illinois (1988), the Court rejected a challenge to witness preclusion rules, holding that the Clause did not provide for an "absolute" right for defendants. The Court held that "The Compulsory Process Clause provides [the defendant] with an effective weapon, but it is a weapon that cannot be used irresponsibly". There are "countervailing public interests" which weigh against an absolute position of applying the Clause; this signaled a major turn since Washington two decades earlier.

== Remedies ==
In modern practice, a violation of the Compulsory Process Clause leads to the reversal of a conviction unless the original error is "harmless". This occurs because the exclusion of defense evidence can "significantly undermine fundamental elements of the [defendant's] defense". The remedy is not automatic reversal only because not every Sixth Amendment error is automatically a Due Process error.

== Other sources of a right to compulsory process ==
The Due Process Clauses of the Fifth and Fourteenth Amendments also require compulsory process as an element of due process. State statutes and constitutions are another source of the right to confront witnesses.
