= De Jonge v. Oregon =

- Supreme Court of the United States

Argued December 9, 1936 Decided January 4, 1937
- Full case name: Dirk De Jonge v. State of Oregon
- Citations: 299 U.S. 353 (more) 57 S. Ct. 255, 81 L. Ed. 278, 1937 U.S. LEXIS 1135

Case history
- Prior: State v. De Jonge, 152 Or. 315, 51 P.2d 674 (1936); probable jurisdiction noted, 57 S. Ct. 45 (1936).

Holding
- The Oregon statute was unconstitutional as applied in this case. Even though the Communist Party generally advocated violent revolution, the First Amendment bars a prosecution for attending a peaceful public meeting called by that Party. Oregon Supreme Court reversed.

Court membership
- Chief Justice Charles E. Hughes Associate Justices Willis Van Devanter · James C. McReynolds; Louis Brandeis · George Sutherland; Pierce Butler · Harlan F. Stone; Owen Roberts · Benjamin N. Cardozo

Case opinion
- Majority: Hughes, joined by Van Devanter, McReynolds, Brandeis, Sutherland, Butler, Roberts, Cardozo
- Stone took no part in the consideration or decision of the case.
- This case overturned a previous ruling or rulings
- United States v. Cruikshank, 1876 (in part)

De Jonge v. Oregon, 299 U.S. 353 (1937), was a case in which the Supreme Court of the United States held that the Fourteenth Amendment's due process clause applies the First Amendment right of freedom of assembly to the individual U.S. states. The Court found that Dirk De Jonge had the right to speak at a peaceful public meeting held by the Communist Party, even though the party generally advocated an industrial or political change in revolution. However, in the 1950s with the fear of communism on the rise, the Court ruled in Dennis v. United States (1951) that Eugene Dennis, who was the leader of the Communist Party, violated the Smith Act by advocating the forcible overthrow of the United States government.

== Background ==
Oregon's "criminal syndicalism" statute made it a crime to, among other things "assist in conducting any assemblage of persons ... which teaches or advocates ... the doctrine which advocates crime, physical violence, sabotage, or any unlawful acts or methods as a means of accomplishing or effecting industrial or political change or revolution." The statute was similar to state laws the Court had upheld in cases like Gitlow v. New York (1925) and Whitney v. California (1927).

Dirk De Jonge addressed an audience regarding jail conditions in the county and a maritime strike in progress in Portland at a meeting called by the Portland branch of the Communist Party on July 27, 1934. De Jonge was a member of the Party, but the meeting was open to the public and had been publicly advertised as such. A raid on the meeting was carried out by Portland police. De Jonge was arrested and charged with violating the State's criminal syndicalism statute. Once convicted, De Jonge moved for a judgment notwithstanding the verdict and for an acquittal, arguing that there was insufficient evidence to warrant his conviction, since there was no evidence that either De Jonge nor anyone else at the meeting advocated violent acts or revolution. The Oregon Supreme Court upheld his conviction, ruling that the indictment did not charge De Jonge with criminal syndicalism, but rather that he "presided at, conducted and assisted in conducting an assemblage of persons, organization, society and group called by the Communist Party, which was unlawfully teaching and advocating in Multnomah county the doctrine of criminal syndicalism and sabotage." In other words, De Jonge was convicted for associating with the Communist Party, which at other times, although not at that meeting, had advocated criminal syndicalism. De Jonge took his case to the Supreme Court, arguing that his conviction violated his rights under the Fourteenth Amendment.

== Representation ==
- Osmond K. Fraenkel of New York City for the appellant
- Maurice E. Tarshis, Deputy District Attorney of Portland for the State of Oregon.

== Supreme Court decision ==
Chief Justice Charles Evans Hughes delivered the opinion of the Court, which unanimously reversed De Jonge's conviction. Hughes began by emphasizing the precise questions involved in light of the state court's decision. The Court had to accept the indictment as the state court had defined it, and decide the case on the basis that the law had been properly applied: the Oregon Supreme Court had final authority to interpret Oregon law, and by sustaining the conviction, had held that the indictment was sufficient under the Criminal Syndicalism statute. Given that, the Court could only review the indictment as setting out the substantive offense. It couldn't examine the evidence at trial to determine if De Jonge had done anything more culpable than conduct a public Communist Party meeting, because he wasn't charged with anything else, and "Conviction upon a charge not made would be sheer denial of due process". Thus it was irrelevant that De Jonge was, in fact, a member of the Communist Party, and that he encouraged others to join and help the Party at the meeting, since those acts were not necessary to his conviction and anyone else conducting the meeting, whether or not a Party member, could have been prosecuted under the statute. As Hughes explained, "[De Jonge's] sole offense as charged, and for which he was convicted and sentenced to imprisonment for seven years, was that he had assisted in the conduct of a public meeting, albeit otherwise lawful, which was held under the auspices of the Communist Party.... Thus if the Communist Party had called a public meeting in Portland to discuss the tariff, or the foreign policy of the Government, or taxation, or relief, or candidacies for the offices of President, members of Congress, Governor, or state legislators, every speaker who assisted in the conduct of the meeting would be equally guilty" of violating the criminal syndicalism act.

With the scope of the case clarified, Hughes next distinguished decisions like Gitlow and Whitney, which had upheld Criminal Syndicalism laws on their face. He pointed out that in those cases, the defendant was convicted of actually advocating the violent overthrow of the Government, or joining a conspiracy to that end and with that intent. Hughes explained that despite a number of decisions permitting abridgment of free speech, "none of our prior decisions go to the length of sustaining such a curtailment of the right of free speech and assembly as the Oregon statute demands in its present application."

Hughes proceeded to explain why freedom of assembly is such an important right. In poignant and powerful passages, he explained:

[Freedom of assembly] cannot be denied without violating those fundamental principles of liberty and justice which lie at the base of all civil and political institutions. ... The greater the importance of safeguarding the community from incitements to the overthrow of our institutions by force and violence, the more imperative is the need to preserve inviolate the constitutional rights of free speech, free press, and free assembly in order to maintain the opportunity for free political discussion, to the end that government may be responsive to the will of the people and that changes, if desired, may be obtained by peaceful means. Therein lies the security of the Republic, the very foundation of constitutional government.

For these reasons, the Court held, "consistently with the Federal Constitution, peaceable assembly for lawful discussion cannot be made a crime." When a person was charged with unlawfully assisting a group, even a criminal conspiracy like the Communist Party (as the Court assumed), a court had to inquire whether his specific purpose, and his specific actions, aided that unlawful purpose: "If the persons assembling have committed crimes elsewhere, if they have formed or are engaged in a conspiracy against the public peace and order, they may be prosecuted for their conspiracy or other violation of valid laws." As Hughes emphasized in finishing his opinion, the Court accepted the finding that the Communist Party was constantly engaged in criminal syndicalism and attempting to overthrow the government, in Multnomah County and elsewhere. But De Jonge nevertheless had a constitutional right "to discuss the public issues of the day and thus in a lawful manner, without incitement to violence or crime, to seek redress of alleged grievances. That was of the essence of his guaranteed personal liberty." De Jonge's conviction was consequently reversed as a violation of the Due Process Clause.

Over three decades later, the Supreme Court declared a criminal syndicalism law unconstitutional on its face in Brandenburg v. Ohio (1969), overruling Whitney and casting serious doubt on Gitlow. Brandenburg reaffirmed the holding of De Jonge that peaceful political assembly is a right protected by the Fourteenth Amendment.

== See also ==
- List of United States Supreme Court cases, volume 299
- Whitney v. California, 271 U.S. 583 (1927)
- Dennis v. United States, 341 U.S. 494 (1951)
