= Taylor v. Illinois =

- Supreme Court of the United States

Argued October 7, 1987 Decided January 25, 1988
- Full case name: Ray Taylor v. State of Illinois
- Citations: 484 U.S. 400 (more) 108 S. Ct. 646; 98 L. Ed. 2d 798; 1988 U.S. LEXIS 573

Case history
- Prior: Conviction affirmed, People v. Taylor, 141 Ill.App.3d 839, 491 N.E.2d 3 (1986); leave to appeal denied, unreported (Ill., 1987); cert. granted, 479 U.S. 1063 (1987).

Holding
- The refusal to allow an undisclosed witness to testify after a trial has started does not violate a defendant's right to obtain favorable testimony under the Compulsory Process Clause. Illinois Appellate Court affirmed.

Court membership
- Chief Justice William Rehnquist Associate Justices William J. Brennan Jr. · Byron White; Thurgood Marshall · Harry Blackmun; John P. Stevens · Sandra Day O'Connor; Antonin Scalia

Case opinions
- Majority: Stevens, joined by Rehnquist, White, O'Connor, Scalia
- Dissent: Brennan, joined by Marshall, Blackmun
- Dissent: Blackmun

Laws applied
- Compulsory Process Clause

Taylor v. Illinois, 484 U.S. 400 (1988), is a United States Supreme Court decision in which the Court held that defense witnesses can be prevented from testifying under certain circumstances, even if that hurts the defense's case. Taylor was the first case to hold that there is no absolute bar to blocking the testimony of a surprise witness, even if that is an essential witness for the defendant, a limitation of the broad right to present a defense recognized in Washington v. Texas (1967).

Taylor was the first Compulsory Process Clause case since Washington v. Texas to provide a specific limitation on the right of defendants to force their witnesses to testify. In that case, the Court construed a defendant's right very broadly in his ability to present a defense. Here, however, the Court restricted that ability to comply with court rules, especially if those rules were of equal consequence upon both the prosecution and the defense. This decision was reached over the dissent of three Justices, all of whom felt a defendant's case should not be limited based on an error solely by the defendant's attorney to list appropriate witnesses.

== Background ==
=== History of discovery rules ===
Discovery procedures for defendants began with adoption of state laws in the 1920s. In the following decades, courts began instituting new procedures. In 1962, for example, the California Supreme Court ordered reciprocal discovery rules, without an initial law requiring it. However, a series of problems surfaced with this judicially imposed system. Not only did both sides refuse to share intended testimony, but no 'alibi notice rule' was fashioned, leading to an unworkable position for both sides. In 1974, the California Supreme Court ordered the legislature to create the discovery system, ending the state's experiment with judicial discovery rule-making.

In 1970, the United States Supreme Court first set down principles in terms of the constitutionality of discovery rules. In Williams v. Florida, the Court held that Florida's 'notice-of-alibi' rule did not violate the Fifth Amendment. While the rule in Williams was reciprocal, it was not for another three years before the Court mandated that discovery rules had to be reciprocal as a general principle. The decision articulated the "two-way street" approach, that "trials be run as a 'search for truth'" without either side maintaining "'poker game' secrecy for its own witnesses".

Along with these decisions that were specific to the discovery process, the Supreme Court broadened the general constitutional rights for defendants in the 1967 ruling of Washington v. Texas. In Washington, the Court incorporated the Compulsory Process Clause against the states, holding that "the Constitution is violated by arbitrary rules that prevent whole categories of defense witnesses from testifying". Despite this, the Court did not rule specifically on whether the preclusion sanction was appropriate, instead applying the constitutional standard for an absolutist state law. Over the next few decades, the Supreme Court rejected attempts to review the sole constitutionality of a preclusion sanction.

=== Taylor's trial ===
On August 6, 1981, Ray Taylor was arrested for the murder of Jack Bridges in a fight in Chicago. In advance of the trial, the prosecutor submitted a request for all the defense witnesses in the case. The defense attorney for Taylor provided a list of four individuals, which did not include witnesses Alfred Wormley and Pam Berkhalter. When the defendant tried to introduce these witnesses on the second day of the trial, the trial judge sanctioned the defense for failing to put the witness names on the original list provided to the prosecution. Therefore, it ruled the two unlisted witnesses would not be allowed to testify. The trial judge was specifically frustrated that the witness, Wormley, was known to the defense prior to trial, but was hidden away from the prosecution.

A jury convicted Taylor of the murder charge and the Illinois Appellate Court affirmed. It held that when "discovery rules are violated, the trial judge may exclude the evidence which the violating party wishes to introduce". The Appellate Court's ruling further gave the trial judge discretion in the appropriate remedy in such a case – whether to exclude entirely the 'surprise' witnesses.

Taylor sought a writ of certiorari to the United States Supreme Court to review his case, which was accepted.

== Opinion of the Court ==
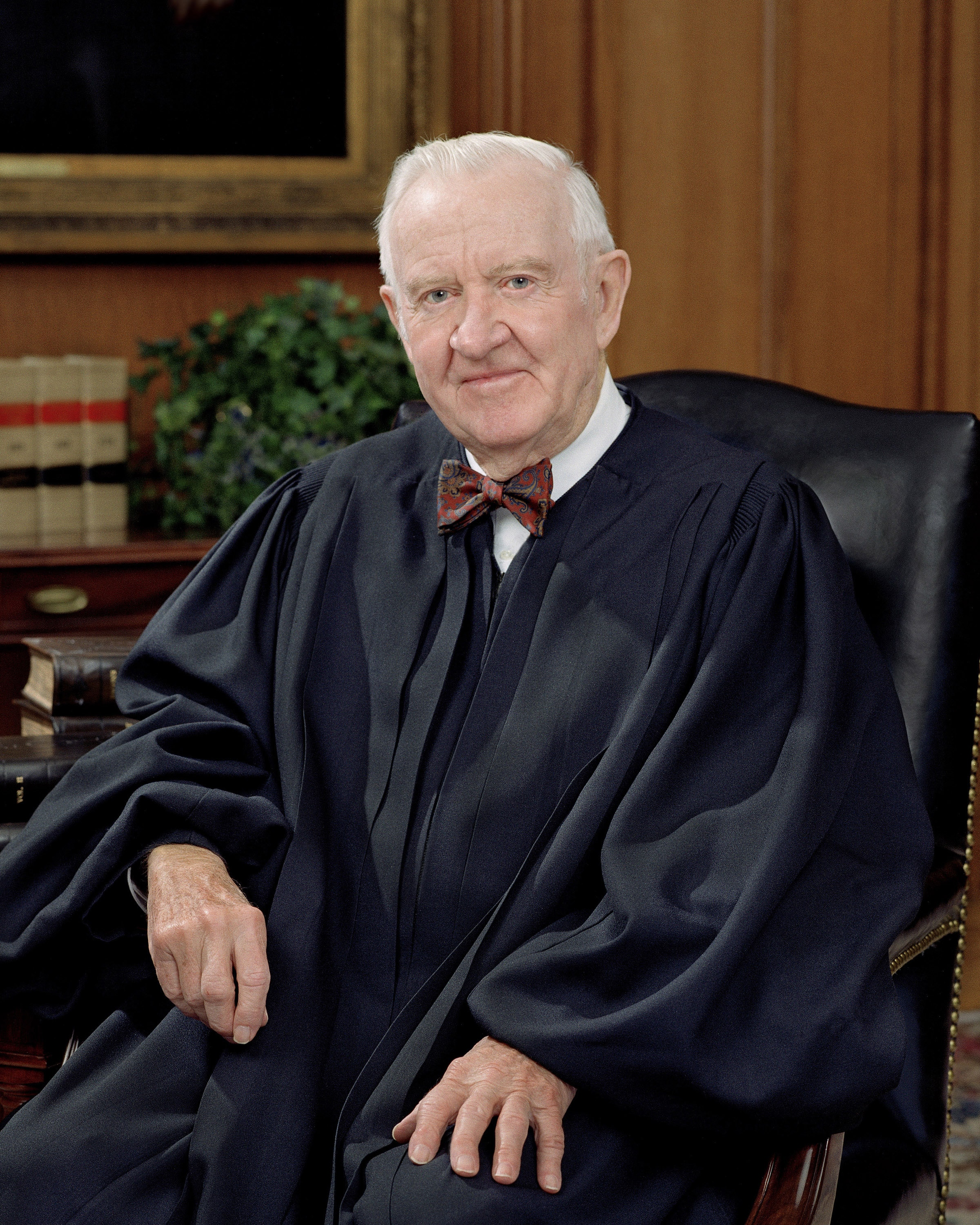
Justice John Paul Stevens wrote the majority opinion in Taylor v. Illinois.

Justice John Paul Stevens wrote the opinion, which affirmed the decision of the Illinois Appellate Court, and upheld Taylor's conviction. He began by addressing the position of the state of Illinois, who argued that there is never a Compulsory Process Clause concern when preclusion of a witness is used as a discovery sanction. The Court had held the converse view, Stevens wrote that "few rights are more fundamental than that of an accused to present witnesses in his own defense". This strong footing of Sixth Amendment values forced the Court to reject the State's absolutist argument.

At the same time though, the Court rejected the defendant's broad claim that there could never be preclusion of a defense witness. Stevens wrote that "[t]he Compulsory Process Clause provides [the defendant] with an effective weapon, but it is a weapon that cannot be used irresponsibly". The whole adversarial process would be destroyed, Stevens argued, if either side could simply refuse to follow the basic rules of the Court. There are "countervailing public interests" which weigh against the absolute defense position.

The broader idea embedded in the opinion was the idea that willful misconduct of an attorney lowers the truthfulness of proffered testimony. In the instant case, the Court held that a trial judge could hold the "presumption" that a new witnesses' testimony is perjured due to "a pattern of discovery violations". The pattern in Taylor's case was a series of two amendments to the witness list done in bad faith. "It would demean the high purpose of the [Clause] to construe it as encompassing an absolute right to an automatic continuance or mistrial", Stevens wrote.

As the misconduct of the judge towards the defense counsel did not implicate the Sixth Amendment's Compulsory Process Clause, there was no need to disrupt the lower courts' decisions. Further, even though the defendant was harmed by the defense counsel error, Stevens wrote that such an argument could not excuse the counsel's fault.

Despite the rejection of Taylor's constitutional position, the Court did create the framework for a balancing test for lower courts to use in handling future discovery preclusion questions. A trial court must balance the defendant's interest in a robust defense with the (i) state's interest in 'efficient' justice, (ii) state's interest in excluding evidence lacking integrity, (iii) state's interest in a strong judicial authority with followed rules, and (iv) the prosecution interest in avoiding prejudice due to a defendant's discovery violation.

=== Brennan's dissent ===
Justice Brennan's dissenting opinion was joined by Justices Marshall and Blackmun. Brennan argued that the "Court's balancing test creates a conflict of interest in every case involving a discovery violation" such that a better approach would be to hold that the "Compulsory Process Clause per se bars discovery sanctions that exclude criminal defense evidence".

Brennan quoted at length from Washington v. Texas, a 1967 case which announced broad rights for defendants to present a defense. "The exclusion of criminal defense evidence undermines the central truthseeking aim of our criminal justice system", Brennan opined, "because it deliberately distorts the record at the risk of misleading the jury into convicting an innocent person". He went on to argue that simple preclusion of a defense witness was too extreme a penalty for a discovery violation, to the point that it "subverts criminal justice by basing convictions on a partial presentation of the facts".

=== Blackmun's dissent ===
Justice Blackmun wrote a separate one-paragraph long dissenting opinion. He stressed that "the State's legitimate interests might well occasion a result different from what should obtain in the factual context of the present case".

== See also ==
- Due Process Clause
- Sixth Amendment to the United States Constitution
