= Twining v. New Jersey =

- Supreme Court of the United States

Argued March 19–20, 1908 Decided November 9, 1908
- Full case name: Albert C. Twining and David C. Cornell, plaintiffs in error v. State of New Jersey
- Citations: 211 U.S. 78 (more) 29 S. Ct. 14, 53 L. Ed. 97, 1908 U.S. LEXIS 1528

Holding
- Fifth Amendment rights against self-incrimination apply only to federal, not state, court cases.

Court membership
- Chief Justice Melville Fuller Associate Justices John M. Harlan · David J. Brewer; Edward D. White · Rufus W. Peckham; Joseph McKenna · Oliver W. Holmes Jr. William R. Day · William H. Moody

Case opinions
- Majority: Moody, joined by Fuller, Brewer, White, Peckham, McKenna, Holmes, Day
- Dissent: Harlan
- Overruled by
- Malloy v. Hogan, 378 U.S. 1 (1964)

Twining v. New Jersey, 211 U.S. 78 (1908), was a case of the U.S. Supreme Court. In this case, the Court established the Incorporation Doctrine by concluding that while certain rights enumerated in the Bill of Rights might apply to the states under the Fourteenth Amendment's Due Process Clause, the Fifth Amendment's right against self-incrimination is not incorporated.

The Twining decision was overturned by the decision in Malloy v. Hogan in 1964, in which the Court incorporated the right against self-incrimination.

== Background ==
The case involved two men charged with fraud in New Jersey who claimed Fifth Amendment protection and refused to testify during their trial. The jury was told of the men's refusal to testify, and they were convicted. They appealed, arguing that the instructions to the jury violated their Fifth Amendment right against self-incrimination.

== Majority decision ==
The Supreme Court used the case to decide whether the Fifth Amendment right against self-incrimination was valid during trials in state courts, not just in federal courts. Before the adoption of the Fourteenth Amendment, the Bill of Rights, including the Fifth Amendment, did not apply to state courts. The Court did not reach the question of whether the defendants' Fifth Amendment rights were actually violated in the original trial.

The majority opinion was delivered by Justice William Henry Moody. Justice John Marshall Harlan was the lone dissenter. Moody considered both the Privileges or Immunities Clause and the Due Process Clause of the Fourteenth Amendment: "The general question, therefore, is whether such a law violates the Fourteenth Amendment either by abridging the privileges or immunities of citizens of the United States or by depriving persons of their life, liberty or property without due process of law."

=== Privileges or immunities ===
The court cited the decision in the Slaughter-House Cases that the language in the Fourteenth Amendment ("No state shall make or enforce any law which shall abridge the privileges or immunities of citizens of the United States...") did not curtail state power. The Supreme Court decided 8–1 that the Fifth Amendment against self-incrimination applied only to federal court cases.

=== Selective incorporation ===
The case provides an early explanation of the doctrine of selective incorporation: only a portion of the Bill of Rights is applied to the states by incorporation, under the Fourteenth Amendment's Due Process Clause:

"It is possible that some of the personal rights safeguarded by the first eight Amendments against National action may also be safeguarded against state action, because a denial of them would be a denial of due process of law. If this is so, it is not because those rights are enumerated in the first eight Amendments, but because they are of such a nature that they are included in the conception of due process of law."

— Twining v. New Jersey: 211 U.S. 78, 99 (1908)

The court concluded that exemption from self-incrimination was not necessary for a conception of due process.

== Dissent ==
Justice Harlan was the lone dissenter, writing firstly that the Court should have decided whether the defendants' rights were actually violated before reaching the "question of vast moment, one of such transcendent importance" of whether the Fifth Amendment applied to state courts and if the Fifth Amendment applied to state courts by the Due Process Clause.

== Aftermath ==
=== Upheld in 1947 ===
The Twining decision was revisited and upheld in Adamson v. California (1947) in which the merits of Twining were of central consideration. Concurring with the majority, Justice Frankfurter wrote:

"The Twining case shows the judicial process at its best – comprehensive briefs and powerful arguments on both sides, followed by long deliberation, resulting in an opinion by Mr. Justice Moody which at once gained and has ever since retained recognition as one of the outstanding opinions in the history of the Court. After enjoying unquestioned prestige for forty years, the Twining case should not now be diluted, even unwittingly, either in its judicial philosophy or in its particulars."

— Adamson v. California: 332 U.S. 46, 59–60 (1947)

However, Justice Hugo Black disagreed and attacked Twining for giving too much power to state courts. In his famous dissent to Adamson, he wrote:

"I would not reaffirm the Twining decision. I think that decision and the "natural law" theory of the Constitution upon which it relies degrade the constitutional safeguards of the Bill of Rights, and simultaneously appropriate for this Court a broad power which we are not authorized by the Constitution to exercise."

— Adamson v. California: 332 U.S. 46, 70 (1947)

=== Overturned in 1964 ===
Twining was revisited once again and finally overturned in Malloy v. Hogan (1964). In that case, the Court incorporated the Fifth Amendment right against self-incrimination and applied it to state courts.

== See also ==
- List of United States Supreme Court cases, volume 211
