= Adamson v. California =

- Supreme Court of the United States

Argued January 15–16, 1947 Decided June 23, 1947
- Full case name: Adamson v. People of the State of California
- Citations: 332 U.S. 46 (more) 67 S. Ct. 1672; 91 L. Ed. 1903; 1947 U.S. LEXIS 2876; 171 A.L.R. 1223

Case history
- Prior: On appeal from the Supreme Court of California. 27 Cal.2d 478, 165 P.2d 3
- Subsequent: As amended. Rehearing denied, 332 U.S. 784, 68 S. Ct. 27, 92 L. Ed. 367, 1947 U.S. LEXIS 1986 (1947)

Holding
- The Fourteenth Amendment's due process clause did not extend to a defendant's Fifth Amendment right not to bear witness against themselves in state courts.

Court membership
- Chief Justice Fred M. Vinson Associate Justices Hugo Black · Stanley F. Reed; Felix Frankfurter · William O. Douglas; Frank Murphy · Robert H. Jackson; Wiley B. Rutledge · Harold H. Burton

Case opinions
- Majority: Reed, joined by Vinson, Frankfurter, Jackson, Burton
- Concurrence: Frankfurter
- Dissent: Black, joined by Douglas
- Dissent: Murphy, joined by Rutledge

Laws applied
- U.S. Const. amends. V, XIV
- Overruled by
- Malloy v. Hogan (1964)

Adamson v. California, 332 U.S. 46 (1947), was a United States Supreme Court case regarding the incorporation of the Fifth Amendment of the Bill of Rights. Its decision is part of a long line of cases that eventually led to the Selective Incorporation Doctrine.

== Background ==
In Adamson v. California, Admiral Dewey Adamson (his given name, not a military rank) was charged with first-degree murder but chose not to testify on his own behalf because he knew the prosecutor would impeach him with questions about his prior criminal record. The prosecutor then argued that refusal to testify could be seen as an admission of guilt under a California statute that allowed the jury to infer guilt in such cases.

On appeal, however, Adamson's attorney Morris Lavine argued that Adamson's freedom against self-incrimination guaranteed by the Fifth Amendment had been violated. He argued that because the prosecutor had drawn attention to Adamson's refusal to testify, his freedom against self-incrimination had been violated.

== Decision ==
In the majority opinion written by Justice Stanley Forman Reed, the Supreme Court found that while Adamson's rights may have been violated had the case been tried in federal court, the rights guaranteed under the Fifth Amendment did not extend to state courts based on the Due Process Clause of the Fourteenth Amendment.

Justice Reed stated succinctly that "it is settled law that the clause of the Fifth Amendment, protecting a person against being compelled to be a witness against himself, is not made effective by the Fourteenth Amendment as a protection against state action on the ground that freedom from testimonial compulsion is a right of national citizenship...."

Justice Reed based his decision in part on the Court's 1937 decision in Palko v. Connecticut, in which the Court found that the Fifth Amendment's protection against double jeopardy did not apply to the states through the Fourteenth Amendment and the Court's 1908 decision in Twining v. New Jersey.

== Frankfurter's concurrence ==
Justice Felix Frankfurter wrote a concurrence arguing that incorporation of the Bill of Rights by the due process clause of the Fourteenth Amendment would "tear up by the roots much of the fabric of law in the several States, and would deprive the States of opportunity for reforms in legal process designed for extending the area of freedom." He finished with the claim that "it seems pretty late in the day to suggest that a phrase so laden with historic meaning should be given an improvised content consisting of some but not all of the provisions of the first eight Amendments, selected on an undefined basis, with improvisation of content for the provisions so selected." This argument, however, was later rebuffed by a line of cases that incorporated many of the provisions of the first eight amendments of the Bill of Rights.

== Black's dissent ==
Justice Hugo Black strongly opposed the decision and wrote a lengthy dissenting opinion joined by Justice William O. Douglas, in which he argued for the incorporation of the first eight amendments of the Bill of Rights. Specifically, Black argued that while the Court should not incorporate rights not specifically enumerated in the Bill of Rights, it should "extend to all the people of the nation the protection of [the specific enumerated rights of] the Bill of Rights."

Black's dissent, beyond advocating for incorporation, also criticized the Court's use of natural law in the arena of incorporation. Black argued that the Court's use of natural law to discard the argument that the right to be free from self-incrimination should be incorporated was misguided: "I further contend that the 'natural law' formula which the Court uses to reach its conclusion in this case should be abandoned as an incongruous excrescence on our Constitution. I believe that formula to be itself a violation of our Constitution, in that it subtly conveys to courts, at the expense of legislatures, ultimate power over public policies...."

Because of his disagreement with application of the concept of natural law, Black also called for the overruling of Twining v. New Jersey (1908), in which the Court had turned to natural law to support its decision. Indeed, Black thought that the Court's guiding light for incorporation, asking whether the interest at stake was "implicit in the concept of ordered liberty," "degraded the constitutional safeguards of the Bill of Rights, and simultaneously appropriate for this Court a broad power which [it is] not authorized by the Constitution to exercise."

== Murphy's dissent ==
Justice Frank Murphy, joined by Justice Wiley Blount Rutledge, agreed with Black but would have also left open the option that the Court incorporate rights not specifically enumerated in the Bill of Rights. He argued that "occasions may arise where a proceeding falls so far short of conforming to fundamental standards of procedure as to warrant constitutional condemnation in terms of a lack of due process despite the absence of a specific provision in the Bill of Rights."

== See also ==
- List of United States Supreme Court cases, volume 332
