= In re Oliver =

- Supreme Court of the United States

Argued December 16, 1947 Decided March 8, 1948
- Full case name: In re Oliver
- Citations: 333 U.S. 257 (more) 68 S. Ct. 499; 92 L. Ed. 2d 682

Holding
- Incarceration for contempt of court requires notice and to provide accused opportunity for defense.

Court membership
- Chief Justice Fred M. Vinson Associate Justices Hugo Black · Stanley F. Reed; Felix Frankfurter · William O. Douglas; Frank Murphy · Robert H. Jackson; Wiley B. Rutledge · Harold H. Burton

Case opinions
- Majority: Black, joined by Vinson, Reed, Douglas, Murphy, Rutledge, Burton
- Concurrence: Rutledge
- Dissent: Frankfurter
- Dissent: Jackson, joined by Frankfurter

Laws applied
- U.S. Const. amends. VI, XIV

In re Oliver, 333 U.S. 257 (1948), was a decision by the United States Supreme Court involving the application of the right of due process in state court proceedings. The Sixth Amendment in the Bill of Rights states that criminal prosecutions require the defendant "... to be informed of the nature and cause of the accusation...and to have the Assistance of Counsel for his defence." In this case, a witness in a Michigan grand jury hearing was convicted and sentenced to jail without either notice or attorney assistance.

== Prior history ==
On September 11, 1946 William Oliver was summoned by subpoena to a grand jury in Oakland County, Michigan. Circuit Court Judge George B. Hartrick had been appointed as a one-man secret grand jury to investigate organized crime participation in local gambling and public corruption. A local pinball operator, Oliver was examined under oath as a witness and was not accused of any crime or represented by an attorney. At the conclusion of his testimony, Hartrick and two other circuit judges (who were not members of the grand jury but present as advisors) agreed that Oliver had given "false and evasive answers" to Hartrick's questions. Without pausing the proceeding or permitting Oliver counsel, Hartrick convicted Oliver of contempt of court and sentenced him to 60 days in the county jail.

After three days, Oliver was able to secure an attorney who filed for writs of Habeas corpus and certiorari to the Michigan Supreme Court challenging the conviction. Because Michigan state law authorizing the one-man grand jury proceedings allowed judge/grand jury to punish contempt at their sole discretion, The Michigan Supreme Court dismissed Oliver's due process claims as being "without merit" and upheld the conviction and sentence.

== Decision ==
The United States Supreme Court took the case in part to decide if, contrary to the lower Court's opinion, the Sixth Amendment protections applied to state court hearings. The Court's majority opinion began by evaluating the Michigan one-man grand jury process, calling it "unique" and "peculiar." The Court had long accepted that grand juries, operating as investigative tools, needed and were allowed to operate in secrecy. The Michigan grand jury law, however, impermissibly mixed this traditional investigative function with circuit court conviction and punishment. It held that:

- The secrecy of the (irregular and abbreviated) trial for criminal contempt violated the due process clause

- The need for secrecy of grand jury investigative proceedings did not justify secrecy in accusing Oliver of an offense for which he faced jail time
- An accused is entitled to a public trial no matter the offense charged

- The failure to afford Oliver a reasonable opportunity to defend himself against the contempt charge was a denial of due process of law

- At a minimum due process required reasonable notice, the right to examine the witnesses, the right to testify, and the right to counsel
- The judgment of Hartrick that Oliver committed contempt of court in the court's actual presence was insufficient justification to deny Oliver these rights

The Michigan Supreme Court and Oakland County Circuit Court rulings were overturned. Justice Black likened the Michigan grand jury's discretionary contempt convictions to English Star Chamber secret convictions and French pre-Revolutionary lettres de cachet allowing imprisonment without the opportunity for defense.

== Effects of the decision ==
Michigan later eliminated one-person grand juries. Michigan law currently requires citizen's grand juries presided over by a circuit judge. This case was later cited by Pointer v. Texas, 380 U.S. 400 (1965), Chambers v. Mississippi, 410 U.S. 284 (1973), Wolff v. McDonnell, 418 U.S. 539 (1974), Feretta v. California, 422 U.S. 806 (1975), and Daniels v. Williams, 474 U.S. 327 (1986).

== See also ==
- List of United States Supreme Court cases, volume 333
- List of United States Supreme Court cases
