= Malloy v. Hogan =

- Supreme Court of the United States

Argued March 5, 1964 Decided June 15, 1964
- Full case name: Malloy v. Hogan, Sheriff
- Citations: 378 U.S. 1 (more) 84 S. Ct. 1489; 12 L. Ed. 2d 653

Case history
- Prior: 150 Conn. 220, 187 A.2d 744 (1963)

Holding
- The Fourteenth Amendment prohibits state infringement of the privilege against self-incrimination just as the Fifth Amendment prevents the federal government from denying the privilege. In applying the privilege against self-incrimination, the same standards determine whether an accused's silence is justified regardless of whether it is a federal or state proceeding at which he is called to testify.

Court membership
- Chief Justice Earl Warren Associate Justices Hugo Black · William O. Douglas; Tom C. Clark · John M. Harlan II; William J. Brennan Jr. · Potter Stewart; Byron White · Arthur Goldberg

Case opinions
- Majority: Brennan, joined by Warren, Black, Douglas, Goldberg
- Concurrence: Douglas
- Dissent: Harlan, joined by Clark
- Dissent: White, joined by Stewart

Laws applied
- U.S. Const. amends. V, XIV
- This case overturned a previous ruling or rulings
- Twining v. New Jersey, Adamson v. California
- Abrogated by
- Arizona v. Fulminante

Malloy v. Hogan, 378 U.S. 1 (1964), was a case in which the Supreme Court of the United States deemed defendants' Fifth Amendment privilege not to be compelled to be witnesses against themselves was applicable within state courts as well as federal courts, overruling the decision in Twining v. New Jersey (1908). The majority decision holds that the Fourteenth Amendment allows the federal government to enforce the first eight amendments on state governments.

The test for voluntariness used in the Malloy decision was later abrogated by Arizona v. Fulminante (1991).

== Background ==
On September 11, 1959, William Malloy was caught in a state and local police raid in Hartford County Community. Malloy pleaded guilty to pool selling, which falls under a misdemeanor for gambling in Connecticut. Pool selling, synonymous with bookmaking, refers to the selling of chances in a betting pool. He was given a one year sentence in the county jail. After 90 days this was audited and he was put on a two year probation.

In January 1961, the former Chief Justice of the State of Connecticut, Ernest A. Inglis acted as the Grand Juror in asking Malloy a series of questions. These acts were presumed to be done by the Mafia and these questions would help authorities prevent future gambling from taking place. Malloy refused to answer the questions in light of the Fifth Amendment and Fourteenth Amendment.

Malloy was found guilty of contempt after refusing to answer the questions. Malloy was fined and incarcerated in county jail until he frees himself of contempt by answering the questions or until the court releases him.

=== Appeals ===
Malloy filed for a petition for a writ of habeas corpus naming Hartford County Sheriff, Patrick J. Hogan. He believed his imprisonment was unlawful. Trial Court and the Connecticut Supreme Court of Errors denied the writ. Malloy appealed to the United States Court, which agreed to take on the case.

== Question ==
Is a state witness's Fifth Amendment guarantee against self-incrimination protected by the Fourteenth Amendment?

== Oral Argument ==
The questions asked of Malloy as revealed in the U.S. Supreme Court hearing were:

1. For whom Malloy worked on September 11, 1959?
2. Who selected and paid his counsel in connection with his arrest on September 11, 1959?
3. Who selected and paid his bondsman?
4. What is the name of the tenant of the apartment in which he was arrested?
5. Whether or not Malloy knew someone named John Bergoti?

Malloy’s attorney argued and gave the example of the states abiding by the Fourth Amendment’s prohibition against unreasonable searches and seizures applicable through all states through the Fourteenth Amendment, that Malloy’s case is violating the states abiding by the Fifth Amendment per the Fourteenth Amendment. Malloy’s attorney further argued more specifically that the provisions of the Fifth Amendment protecting a person in a criminal case from testifying against himself should be extended by the Fourteenth Amendment to cover state criminal proceedings.

Malloy’s attorney argued that if Malloy had a one year statute of limitations in which he would be charged for the crimes he had committed. Malloy was also presumed to have been involved in a series of felonies which hold a five year statute of limitations. In the case where Malloy had conspiracy to commit felonies, he had a fifteen year statute of limitations.

Hogan’s attorney argued that the questioner is an experienced former state Supreme Court Justice. Malloy’s past criminal record was brought up with motor vehicle intoxication on two occasions, however he had no racketeering or gambling criminal history. Hogan’s attorney continued to say the purpose was to find the core of the crimes, not to further incriminate Malloy. He continued to explain that the Due Process clause under the Fourteenth Amendment was followed in the questions asked of Malloy.

== Decision ==
Justice William J. Brennan, Jr., wrote the 5–4 decision, Justice Brennan wrote the majority of the court in support of Malloy. The court noted that "the American judicial system is accusatorial, not inquisitorial" and the Fourteenth Amendment protects a witness against self-incrimination. Therefore, both state and federal officials must "establish guilt by evidence that is free and independent of a suspect's or witnesses' statements".

Justices Tom C. Clark and John Marshall Harlan II were against the majority’s application of the privilege to defendants in state proceedings. Justices Potter Stewart and Byron R. White agreed with the majority that the privilege against self-incrimination applied to the states but dissented because they did not feel that the facts of this case fit the privilege.

== See also ==
- List of United States Supreme Court cases, volume 378
