= Kern County Land Co. v. Occidental Petroleum Corp. =

- Supreme Court of the United States

Argued December 5–6, 1972 Decided May 7, 1973
- Full case name: Kern County Land Co. v. Occidental Petroleum Corp.
- Docket no.: 71-1059
- Citations: 411 U.S. 582 (more) 411 U.S. 582; 93 S. Ct. 1736; 36 L. Ed. 2d 503 (1973)
- Argument: Oral Arguments

Case history
- Prior: Summary judgment for plaintiff, Abrams v. Occidental Petroleum Corp., 323 F. Supp. 570 (S.D.N.Y. 1970); reversed, 450 F.2d 157 (2d Cir. 1971); cert. granted
- Subsequent: Foremost-McKesson, Inc. v. Provident Securities Co., 423 U.S. 232 (1976)

Holding
- Neither the exchange of shares pursuant to a defensive merger nor the grant of an option to purchase those shares constitutes a "sale" within the meaning of Section 16(b) of the Securities Exchange Act of 1934 where the insider lacked access to inside information and had no realistic opportunity to exploit nonpublic data for short-swing profit.

Court membership
- Chief Justice Warren E. Burger Associate Justices William O. Douglas · William J. Brennan Jr. Potter Stewart · Byron White; Thurgood Marshall · Harry Blackmun; Lewis F. Powell Jr. · William Rehnquist

Case opinions
- Majority: White, joined by Burger, Marshall, Blackmun, Powell, Rehnquist
- Dissent: Douglas, joined by Brennan, Stewart

Laws applied
- Securities Exchange Act of 1934, § 16(b)

Kern County Land Co. v. Occidental Petroleum Corp., 411 U.S. 582 (1973), was a United States Supreme Court case in which the court held that neither the exchange of shares pursuant to a defensive merger nor the grant of an option to purchase those shares constitutes a "sale" within the meaning of Section 16(b) of the Securities Exchange Act of 1934 where the insider lacked access to inside information and had no realistic opportunity to exploit nonpublic data for short-swing profit.

== Background ==
During a tender offer campaign, Occidental Petroleum Corporation bought more than 10% of the outstanding stock of Kern County Land Company's predecessor (Old Kern). Occidental was blocked in its takeover efforts by a defensive merger between Old Kern and Tenneco, in which Old Kern stockholders were to receive new Tenneco stock on a share-for-share basis. Less than a month after its initial tender offer, respondent thereupon negotiated a binding option to sell to Tenneco at a date over six months after the tender offer expired all the new Tenneco stock to which respondent would be entitled when the merger took place. Sale of the post-merger stock yielded respondent a profit of some $19 million, which Kern sought to recover by a suit under § 16(b) of the Securities Exchange Act of 1934, prohibiting profitable short-swing speculation by statutory insiders. The federal District Court's summary judgment for Kern was reversed by the Second Circuit Court of Appeals.

The Supreme Court granted certiorari.

== Opinion of the court ==
The Supreme Court issued an opinion on May 7, 1973.

The majority cited Reliance Electric Co. v. Emerson Electric Co., 404 U.S. 418 (1972), for the principle that Section 16(b) should be applied "only when its application would serve its goals."

== Later developments ==
The Supreme Court applied related reasoning in Foremost-McKesson, Inc. v. Provident Securities Co., 423 U.S. 232 (1976), holding that a purchase that simultaneously creates 10-percent ownership cannot be matched with a same-transaction sale for Section 16(b) disgorgement.
