= Gagnon v. Scarpelli =

- Supreme Court of the United States

Argued January 9, 1973 Decided May 14, 1973
- Full case name: Warden Gagnon v. Gerald Scarpelli
- Citations: 411 U.S. 778 (more) 93 S. Ct. 1756; 36 L. Ed. 2d 656; 1973 U.S. LEXIS 70

Case history
- Prior: Scarpelli v. Gagnon, 317 F. Supp. 72 (E.D. Wis. 1970); affirmed sub. nom., Gunsolus v. Gagnon, 454 F.2d 416 (7th Cir. 1971)

Holding
- A preliminary and final revocation of probation hearings are required by Due Process; the judicial body overseeing the revocation hearings shall determine if the probationer or parolee requires counsel; denying representation of counsel must be documented in the record of the Court.

Court membership
- Chief Justice Warren E. Burger Associate Justices William O. Douglas · William J. Brennan Jr. Potter Stewart · Byron White; Thurgood Marshall · Harry Blackmun; Lewis F. Powell Jr. · William Rehnquist

Case opinions
- Majority: Powell, joined by Burger, Brennan, Stewart, White, Marshall, Blackmun, Rehnquist
- Dissent: Douglas

Laws applied
- Criminal procedure, right to counsel, due process, prisoners' rights

Gagnon v. Scarpelli, 411 U.S. 778 (1973), was the second substantive ruling by the United States Supreme Court regarding the rights of individuals in violation of a probation or parole sentence.

The case involved Gerald Scarpelli, a man serving a probation sentence in the State of Wisconsin for armed robbery. While the judge sentenced Scarpelli to 15 years' imprisonment, the judge suspended Scarpelli's sentence and ordered him to serve 7 years' probation. After the probation sentence began, Scarpelli was arrested for burglary in Illinois. Scarpelli's probation was revoked by the Wisconsin Department of Public Welfare subsequent to his confession to police that he was involved in the burglary. The confession in question was later challenged by Scarpelli as being made under duress. After the revocation proceedings, Scarpelli was incarcerated.

After 3 years of incarceration, Scarpelli challenged the revocation of his probation because he was not afforded a hearing on the matter. The State of Wisconsin argued that his probation was violated for two legitimate reasons: Scarpelli had been associating with felons in general and Scarpelli was associated with a known felon at the time of his arrest.

== Supreme Court decision ==
Based on the holding of Morrissey v. Brewer a year earlier, which extended Fourteenth Amendment due process protection to the parole revocation process, the Supreme Court held, in an 8–1 decision, that a probationer's sentence can only be revoked after a preliminary revocation hearing and a final revocation hearing. These hearings are now known as Gagnon I and Gagnon II hearings, respectively.

Justice Lewis Powell delivered the opinion of the court, which held that:

- Scarpelli should be given a hearing regarding the status of his probation,
- Scarpelli was entitled to a writ of habeas corpus, and
- The Wisconsin Department of Public Welfare should have been directed to 'consider' providing the assistance of counsel to Scarpelli in dealing with his new charge of burglary.

Regarding the first part of the ruling, the probation sentence of an individual cannot be revoked without a hearing. If a probationer commits a violation of their probation, that probation sentence can be revoked only after holding a final violation hearing. The Court explained:

When the (parole officer's) view of the probationer's or parolee's conduct differs in this fundamental way from the latter's own view, due process requires that the difference be resolved before revocation becomes final. Both the probationer or parolee and the State have interests in the accurate finding of fact and the informed use of discretion—the probationer or parolee to insure that his liberty is not unjustifiably taken away and the State to make certain that it is neither unnecessarily interrupting a successful effort at rehabilitation nor imprudently prejudicing the safety of the community.

The Court dismissed the unilateral denial of counsel to a probationer when they are arrested on new charges within the period of probation. Instead, the Court stated a determination if counsel should be provided shall be made on a case-by-case basis. Justice Powell wrote for the majority:

The differences between a criminal trial and a revocation hearing do not dispose altogether of the argument that under a case-by-case approach there may be cases in which a lawyer would be useful but in which none would be appointed because an arguable defense would be uncovered only by a lawyer. Without denying that there is some force in this argument, we think it a sufficient answer that we deal here, not with the right of an accused to counsel in a criminal prosecution, but with the more limited due process right of one who is a probationer or parolee only because he has been convicted of a crime.

== Impact of the Gagnon decision ==
All probationers in the United States who incur a violation or multiple violations are guaranteed certain hearings before any permanent, punitive action is taken. A Gagnon I hearing occurs when a probationer is taken into custody for an alleged violation; this first hearing determines if the probationer should remain in custody or be released back into the community. A Gagnon II hearing is the final revocation procedure. A determination on the status of the probation is made, and if the probationer is found in violation, a sentence (resentence) for the original criminal charge is handed down by the judge.

A violation of probation does not necessarily mean that a violation occurred beyond a reasonable doubt; instead, the standard of evidence required is that the violation occurred by the preponderance of evidence.

== See also ==
- Gideon v. Wainwright, 372 U.S. 335 (1963)
