= Davis v. United States (1973) =

United States Supreme Court case

- Supreme Court of the United States

Argued February 20, 1973 Decided April 17, 1973
- Full case name: Clifford H. Davis, Petitioner, v. United States
- Citations: 411 U.S. 233 (more) 93 S. Ct. 1577, 36 L.Ed.2d 216
- Argument: Oral argument

Case history
- Prior: Davis v. United States, 455 F.2d 919 (CA5 1972)

Holding
- 1. The waiver standard set forth in Fed.Rule Crim.Proc. 12(b)(2) governs an untimely claim of grand jury discrimination, not only during the criminal proceeding, but also later on collateral review. Shotwell Mfg. Co. v. United States, 371 U. S. 341, followed; Kaufman v. United States, 394 U. S. 217, distinguished. 2. The District Court, in the light of the record in this case, did not abuse its discretion in denying petitioner relief from the application of the waiver provision.

Court membership
- Chief Justice Warren E. Burger Associate Justices William O. Douglas · William J. Brennan Jr. Potter Stewart · Byron White; Thurgood Marshall · Harry Blackmun; Lewis F. Powell Jr. · William Rehnquist

Case opinions
- Majority: Rehnquist, joined by Burger, Stewart, White, Blackmun, Powell
- Dissent: Marshall, joined by Douglas, Brennan

Davis v. United States, 411 U.S. 233 (1973), was a 1973 United States Supreme Court case concerning criminal procedure and collateral attacks on criminal convictions. The majority opinion, authored by then-Associate Justice William Rehnquist, held that when claims of unconstitutional jury discrimination are brought on postconviction collateral review, they are subject to the timeliness requirement outlined in Rule 12(b)(2) Federal Rules of Criminal Procedure. This rule required that federal criminal defendants raise "defenses and objections based on defects in the institution of the prosecution or in the indictment" in pretrial motions, rather than in postconviction proceedings; it also stated that if such defenses were not raised in pretrial motions, this constituted a "waiver" of the right to raise them in the future. Davis is now recognized by legal scholars as part of a gradual erosion of the broad availability of federal habeas corpus relief that the Supreme Court originally created in its 1963 decision in Fay v. Noia.
