= Morrissey v. Brewer =

- Supreme Court of the United States

Argued April 11, 1972 Decided June 29, 1972
- Full case name: Morrissey, et al. v. Brewer, Warden, et al.
- Citations: 408 U.S. 471 (more) 92 S. Ct. 2593; 33 L. Ed. 2d 484; 1972 U.S. LEXIS 19

Holding
- A parolee's liberty involves significant values within the protection of the Due Process Clause of the Fourteenth Amendment, and termination of that liberty requires an informal hearing.

Court membership
- Chief Justice Warren E. Burger Associate Justices William O. Douglas · William J. Brennan Jr. Potter Stewart · Byron White; Thurgood Marshall · Harry Blackmun; Lewis F. Powell Jr. · William Rehnquist

Case opinions
- Majority: Burger, joined by Stewart, White, Blackmun, Powell, Rehnquist
- Concurrence: Brennan, joined by Marshall
- Dissent: Douglas

Morrissey v. Brewer, 408 U.S. 471 (1972), was a United States Supreme Court case in which the court held that people facing parole revocation have due process rights under the Fourteenth Amendment. The decision requires that the states provide for a hearing before a "neutral and detached" hearing body, such as a parole board, to determine the factual basis for parole violations. This hearing is colloquially known as a "Morrissey hearing."

The hearing can take place with the defendant in or out of custody. If applicable, a victim may be ordered to testify at a hearing. During the hearing, a member of the Parole Hearing Division reviews the evidence of the violation.

The parolee is usually present and can present witnesses and documentary evidence and ask the victim questions. But in extreme cases the victim can be interviewed outside the parolee's presence. If this happens, the parolee can leave a list of questions for the victim to answer. Evidence including letters, affidavits, and other material that would not be admissible in an adversary criminal trial can be allowed in a Morrissey hearing.

After the hearing, the factfinders issue a written statement as to the evidence relied upon and reasons for revoking parole. The victim can be notified about the outcome.

Brennan and Marshall noted in their concurrence, "The only question open under our precedents is whether counsel must be furnished the parolee if he is indigent."
