= List of United States Supreme Court cases, volume 411 =

This is a list of all the United States Supreme Court cases from volume 411 of the United States Reports:

Case name	Citation	Date decided
San Antonio Independent School Dist. v. Rodriguez	411 U.S. 1	1973
Camp v. Pitts	411 U.S. 138	1973
Ohio Municipal Judges Ass'n v. Davis	411 U.S. 144	1973
Mescalero Apache Tribe v. Jones	411 U.S. 145	1973
McClanahan v. Ariz. State Tax Comm'n	411 U.S. 164	1973
Butz v. Glover Livestock Comm'n Co.	411 U.S. 182	1973
Lemon v. Kurtzman	411 U.S. 192	1973
Fontaine v. United States	411 U.S. 213	1973
United States v. Indrelunas	411 U.S. 216	1973
Brown v. United States (1973)	411 U.S. 223	1973
Davis v. United States (1973)	411 U.S. 233	1973
Tollett v. Henderson	411 U.S. 258	1973
Dept. of Pub. Health v. Dept. of Pub. Health	411 U.S. 279	1973
Askew v. Am. Waterways Operators, Inc.	411 U.S. 325	1973
Hensley v. Municipal Ct.	411 U.S. 345	1973
Mourning v. Family Publications Service, Inc.	411 U.S. 356	1973
Palmore v. United States	411 U.S. 389	1973
United States v. Russell	411 U.S. 423	1973
Tonasket v. Washington	411 U.S. 451	1973
Brown v. Chote	411 U.S. 452	1973
FPC v. Memphis Light, Gas & Water Div.	411 U.S. 458	1973
Preiser v. Rodriguez	411 U.S. 475	1973
Georgia v. United States	411 U.S. 526	1973
United States v. Cartwright	411 U.S. 546	1973
Gibson v. Berryhill	411 U.S. 564	1973
Kern Cnty. Land Co. v. Occidental Petroleum Corp.	411 U.S. 582	1973
Gaca v. United States	411 U.S. 618	1973
N.J. Welfare Rights Org. v. Cahill	411 U.S. 619	1973
Burbank v. Lockheed Air Terminal, Inc.	411 U.S. 624	1973
United States v. Pa. Indus. Chem. Corp.	411 U.S. 655	1973
Frontiero v. Richardson	411 U.S. 677	1973
Moor v. Alameda Cnty.	411 U.S. 693	1973
Fed. Maritime Comm'n v. Seatrain Lines, Inc.	411 U.S. 726	1973
Gulf States Util. Co. v. FPC	411 U.S. 747	1973
Gagnon v. Scarpelli	411 U.S. 778	1973
McDonnell Douglas Corp. v. Green	411 U.S. 792	1973
