= Heart of Atlanta Motel, Inc. v. United States =

1964 US Supreme Court case

- Supreme Court of the United States

Argued October 5, 1964 Decided December 14, 1964
- Full case name: Heart of Atlanta Motel, Incorporated v. United States, et al.
- Citations: 379 U.S. 241 (more) 85 S. Ct. 348; 13 L. Ed. 2d 258; 1964 U.S. LEXIS 2187; 1 Empl. Prac. Dec. (CCH) ¶ 9712

Case history
- Prior: Judgment for defendant, 231 F. Supp. 393 (N.D. Ga. 1964); probable jurisdiction noted, 379 U.S. 803 (1964).
- Subsequent: None

Holding
- Congress did not unconstitutionally exceed its powers under the Commerce Clause by enacting Title II of the 1964 Civil Rights Act, which prohibited racial discrimination in public accommodations. Northern District of Georgia affirmed.

Court membership
- Chief Justice Earl Warren Associate Justices Hugo Black · William O. Douglas; Tom C. Clark · John M. Harlan II; William J. Brennan Jr. · Potter Stewart; Byron White · Arthur Goldberg

Case opinions
- Majority: Clark, joined by Warren, Douglas, Harlan, Brennan, Stewart, White, Goldberg
- Concurrence: Black
- Concurrence: Douglas
- Concurrence: Goldberg

Laws applied
- U.S. Const. art. I; Title II of the Civil Rights Act of 1964

Heart of Atlanta Motel, Inc. v. United States, 379 U.S. 241 (1964), is a landmark decision of the Supreme Court of the United States holding that the Commerce Clause gave the U.S. Congress power to force private businesses to abide by Title II of the Civil Rights Act of 1964, which prohibits discrimination on the basis of race, religion, or national origin in public accommodations.

== Background ==
This important case represented an immediate challenge to the Civil Rights Act of 1964, the landmark piece of civil rights legislation, which represented the first comprehensive act by Congress on civil rights and race relations since the Civil Rights Act of 1875. In the 100 years preceding 1964, African Americans in the United States had been subjected to racial segregation, a system of racial separation which, while in name providing for "separate but equal" treatment of both white and African Americans, in fact provided inferior or no accommodation, services, and treatment for African Americans.

During the mid-20th century, partly as a result of cases such as Powell v. Alabama, 287 U.S. 45 (1932); Smith v. Allwright, 321 U.S. 649 (1944); Shelley v. Kraemer, 334 U.S. 1 (1948); Sweatt v. Painter, 339 U.S. 629 (1950); McLaurin v. Oklahoma State Regents, 339 U.S. 637 (1950); NAACP v. Alabama, 357 U.S. 449 (1958); Boynton v. Virginia, 364 U.S. 454 (1960); and, most notably, Brown v. Board of Education of Topeka, 347 U.S. 483 (1954), public opinion began to turn against segregation. Despite the outcomes of these cases, segregation remained in full effect into the 1960s in parts of the southern United States, where the Heart of Atlanta Motel was located.

== Court case ==
=== Petitioner's argument ===
The Heart of Atlanta Motel was a large, 216-room motel that opened on September 5, 1956, in Atlanta, Georgia. In direct violation of the terms of the Civil Rights Act of 1964, which banned racial discrimination in public places, largely based on Congress's control of interstate commerce, the motel refused to rent rooms to African-American patrons. The owner, Moreton Rolleston, filed suit in federal court, arguing that the requirements of the Act exceeded the authority the Commerce Clause granted to Congress over interstate commerce. Rolleston specifically argued against Title II of the Civil Rights Act of 1964, which prohibits discrimination on the basis of race, religion, or national origin in places of public accommodation. Hotels and motels are included as types of public accommodation in the Act, and so are restaurants that serve food substantially to those who participate in interstate travel. In further arguing against the validity of the Act's basis on the Commerce Clause, he stated that people themselves are not commerce; rather, people engage in commerce. Therefore, a hotel or motel does not necessarily engage in interstate commerce because the profit comes from persons rather than goods. Rolleston also asserted that racial discrimination by an individual is not prohibited by the Fourteenth Amendment or the Constitution, claiming that discrimination is a private wrong that individuals are allowed to commit.

In addition, Rolleston maintained that it violated his Fifth Amendment rights to choose customers and operate his business as he wished and resulted in unjust deprivation of his property without due process of law and just compensation. Finally, he contended that Congress had placed him in a position of involuntary servitude by forcing him to rent available rooms to African Americans, thereby violating his Thirteenth Amendment rights. Rolleston noted that in 1944 the Fifth Circuit Court of Appeals for the United States held that even if acts committed in involuntary servitude are compensated, it still violates the Thirteenth Amendment.

Rolleston maintained throughout his argument that the Constitution should be interpreted as it was at the time of its creation and as the Framers originally intended it. He concluded his opening argument by stating that the Supreme Court did not need to exist if the Commerce Clause allowed for Congress to enact any regulations it pleases.

=== Respondent's argument ===
In response, Archibald Cox, the Solicitor General for the United States, countered that the restrictions requiring adequate accommodation for African Americans were unquestionably related to interstate travel and that Congress, under the Constitution's Commerce Clause, certainly had the power to address such a matter in law. Cox stated that racial discrimination in inns and restaurants “constitute[s] a source of burden or obstruction to interstate commerce.” He brought up multiple examples in which protests over racial discrimination, some in regards to public accommodations and some with broader scopes, intensely affected the economy of certain areas. One of the prime examples was Birmingham, Alabama in the spring of 1963, during which department and downtown store sales dropped dramatically in the area and the amount of business failure rivaled the rates of the Great Depression. Cox also mentioned that areas that do not practice equal opportunity are often overlooked by companies that seek commercial and industrial expansion due to the possibility of demonstrations. He used Little Rock, Arkansas to exemplify this point, as business expansion fell by over 50 million dollars in the two years it experienced high racial tensions.

Cox also highlighted how discrimination by hotels and motels hinders interstate travel by limiting the availability of accommodations for travelers. He described the impediment discrimination imposes with a hypothetical road trip:

On a motor trip between Washington D.C. and Miami, Florida, the average distance that was found between accommodations of reasonable quality open to Negroes was 141 miles. And when we think of the frequency by such we go by other hotels and motels open to everyone, the significance of a three or four-hour drive between the hope of accommodation is very significant indeed. — Archibald Cox

He further argued that the Fifth Amendment does not forbid reasonable regulation of interstate commerce and that such incidental damage did not constitute the "taking" of property without just compensation or due process of law. He emphasized that the courts have consistently sustained cases that strengthen anti-discrimination measures. Lastly, he asserted that the Thirteenth Amendment applies primarily to slavery and the removal of widespread disabilities associated with it and so it undoubtedly would not place issues of racial discrimination in public accommodations beyond the reach of federal and state law:

But surely it would turn the world quite upside down for anyone to seriously suggest that the Thirteenth Amendment was intended to prohibit either Congress or the state governments from guaranteeing Negroes equality of treatment in places of public accommodation. — Archibald Cox

=== Ruling ===
On July 22, 1964, the three judge panel for the United States District Court for the Northern District of Georgia ruled in favor of the United States. It issued a permanent injunction requiring the Heart of Atlanta Motel, Inc. to refrain from using racial discrimination when providing services or goods to guests or the general public on its premises. The case was combined with the case of the future Governor of Georgia Lester Maddox, regarding his Pickrick restaurant and his refusal to serve African Americans.

The plaintiffs appealed the decision to the U.S. Supreme Court, which unanimously upheld the District Court ruling. The opinion of the court, announced on December 14, 1964, was delivered by Justice Tom C. Clark, with concurring opinions by Justices Arthur Goldberg, Hugo Black, and William O. Douglas.

The ruling held that Congress acted well within its authority under the Commerce Clause in passing the Civil Rights Act of 1964, thereby upholding the act's Title II in question. While it might have been possible for Congress to pursue other methods for abolishing racial discrimination, the way in which Congress did so, according to the court, was perfectly valid. It found no merit in the arguments pursuant to the Thirteenth Amendment, finding it difficult to conceive that such an amendment might be applicable in restraining civil rights legislation. Having observed that 75% of the Heart of Atlanta Motel's clientele came from out-of-state and that it was strategically located near Interstates 75 and 85 as well as two major Georgia highways, the court found that the business clearly affected interstate commerce. Accordingly, it upheld the permanent injunction issued by the district court and required the Heart of Atlanta Motel to receive business from the clientele of all ethnicities.

== Case legacy ==
Heart of Atlanta Motel, Inc. v. United States has been cited in at least 690 other case decisions since its ruling, including multiple other Supreme Court cases. In the 1997 case Camps Newfound/Owatonna, Inc. v. Town of Harrison a summer camp in Maine that mainly serviced out-of-state residents fought against a state tax exemption statute that favored organizations that serviced state residents. The courts compared out-of-state campers staying at a summer camp to out-of-state residents occupying a hotel, deeming the camp a participant in interstate commerce. Another example is the 1966 case United States v. Guest, in which the courts ruled, due to the conspiratorial murder of Lt. Col. Lemuel Penn while he was traveling home, that forcefully depriving someone's right to travel is unconstitutional.

== See also ==
- Constantine v Imperial Hotels Ltd
- Katzenbach v. McClung
- List of United States Supreme Court cases, volume 379
- The Negro Motorist Green Book
