= List of landmark court decisions in the United States =

Important decisions of US courts

The following landmark court decisions changed the interpretation of existing law in the United States. Such a decision may settle the law in more than one way:

- establishing a new legal principle or concept;
- overturning precedent based on its harmful effects or flaws in its reasoning;
- distinguishing a new principle that refines an existing principle, thus departing from prior practice without violating the rule of stare decisis;
- establishing a test or a measurable standard that can be applied by courts in future decisions.

In the United States, landmark court decisions come most frequently from the Supreme Court. United States courts of appeals may also make such decisions, particularly if the Supreme Court chooses not to review the case. Although many cases from state supreme courts are significant in developing the law of that state, only a few are so revolutionary that they announce standards that many other state courts then choose to follow.

== Individual rights ==
=== Discrimination based on race and ethnicity ===
- Dred Scott v. Sandford, 60 U.S. 393 (1857) People of African descent that are slaves or were slaves and subsequently freed, along with their descendants, cannot be United States citizens. Consequently, they cannot sue in federal court. Slavery in the United States cannot be prohibited in U.S. territories before they are admitted to the Union as doing so would violate the Due Process Clause of the Fifth Amendment. After the Civil War, this decision was voided by the Thirteenth and Fourteenth Amendments to the Constitution.
- Strauder v. West Virginia, 100 U.S. 303 (1880) The exclusion of individuals from juries solely because of their race is a violation of the Equal Protection Clause. This was the first time that the Supreme Court reversed a state criminal conviction due to a violation of a constitutional provision concerning criminal procedure.
- Yick Wo v. Hopkins, 118 U.S. 356 (1886) Racially discriminatory application of a racially neutral statute violates the Equal Protection Clause of the Fourteenth Amendment.
- Plessy v. Ferguson, 163 U.S. 537 (1896) Segregated facilities for blacks and whites are constitutional under the doctrine of separate but equal. As long as the separate facilities are equal in quality, then such separation is not unconstitutional. (De facto overruled by Brown v. Board of Education (1954))
- Missouri ex rel. Gaines v. Canada, 305 U.S. 337 (1938) States with racially segregated educational systems cannot satisfy the "separate but equal" provision of Plessy merely by offering to pay for black students to be educated at an out-of-state institution; they must offer those opportunities in-state.
- Smith v. Allwright, 321 U.S. 649 (1944) Primary elections must be open to voters of all races, holding unconstitutional the white primary.
- Steele v. Louisville & Nashville Railway Co., 323 U.S. 192 (1944) Imposed duty of fair representation on labor unions, requiring that they represent all members of their bargaining unit equally, without regard to race or union membership (later understood to include other protected categories, and eventually all misfeasance or malfeasance in the act of representing a member).
- Korematsu v. United States, 323 U.S. 214 (1944) President Franklin D. Roosevelt's Executive Order 9066 is constitutional; therefore, American citizens of Japanese descent can be interned and deprived of their basic constitutional rights. This case featured the first application of strict scrutiny to racial discrimination by the government. (Overruled by Trump v. Hawaii (2018))
- Morgan v. Virginia, 328 U.S. 373 (1946) A Virginia law that enforces segregation on interstate buses is unconstitutional.
- Shelley v. Kraemer, 334 U.S. 1 (1948) Courts may not enforce racial covenants on real estate.
- Sweatt v. Painter, 339 U.S. 629 (1950) and McLaurin v. Oklahoma State Regents, 339 U.S. 637 (1950) Segregation in higher education, in law schools and graduate programs respectively, violates the Equal Protection Clause. Laid the groundwork for the desegregation of all schools in Brown v. Board of Education, four years later.
- Henderson v. United States, 339 U.S. 816 (1950) The Interstate Commerce Act of 1887 makes it unlawful for a railroad that engages in interstate commerce to subject any particular person to any undue or unreasonable prejudice or disadvantage in any respect whatsoever.
- Hernandez v. Texas, 347 U.S. 475 (1954) The equal protection of the laws guaranteed by the Fourteenth Amendment covers any racial, national, and ethnic groups of the United States against whom discrimination can be proved.
- Brown v. Board of Education, 347 U.S. 483 (1954) Segregated schools in the states are unconstitutional because they violate the Equal Protection Clause of the Fourteenth Amendment. The Court found that the separate but equal doctrine adopted in Plessy "has no place in the field of public education".
- Bolling v. Sharpe, 347 U.S. 497 (1954) Segregated schools in the District of Columbia violate the Equal Protection Clause as incorporated against the federal government by the Due Process Clause of the Fifth Amendment.
- Sarah Keys v. Carolina Coach Company, 64 MCC 769 (1955) According to the Interstate Commerce Commission, the non-discrimination language of the Interstate Commerce Act of 1887 bans racial segregation on buses traveling across state lines. The Supreme Court later adopted and expanded this decision in Boynton v. Virginia (1960).
- Browder v. Gayle, 142 F.Supp. 707 (M.D. Ala. 1956) Bus segregation is unconstitutional under the Equal Protection Clause.
- Gomillion v. Lightfoot, 364 U.S. 339 (1960) Electoral district boundaries drawn only to disenfranchise blacks violate the Fifteenth Amendment.
- Boynton v. Virginia, 364 U.S. 454 (1960) Racial segregation in all forms of public transportation is illegal under the Interstate Commerce Act of 1887.
- Garner v. Louisiana, 368 U.S. 157 (1961) Peaceful sit-in demonstrators protesting segregationist policies cannot be arrested under a state's "disturbing the peace" laws.
- Heart of Atlanta Motel, Inc. v. United States, 379 U.S. 241 (1964) The Commerce Clause gives Congress power to force private businesses to abide by Title II of the Civil Rights Act of 1964, which prohibits discrimination in public accommodations.
- Loving v. Virginia, 388 U.S. 1 (1967) Laws that prohibit interracial marriage (anti-miscegenation laws) are unconstitutional.
- Swann v. Charlotte-Mecklenburg Board of Education, 402 U.S. 1 (1971) The busing of students to promote racial integration in public schools is constitutional.
- Griggs v. Duke Power Co., 401 U.S. 424 (1971) Interpreted the federal statute prohibiting employment discrimination to also prohibit "disparate impact," meaning employer policies that generate unequal employment outcomes regardless of whether the employer provably intended for them to do so, if those policies are not necessary for the employer's business purposes.
- Lau v. Nichols, 414 U.S. 563 (1974) The lack of supplemental language instruction in public school for students with limited English proficiency violates Title VI of the Civil Rights Act of 1964.
- Gates v. Collier, 501 F.2d 1291 (5th Cir. 1974) This decision brought an end to the trusty system and flagrant inmate abuse at the Mississippi State Penitentiary in Parchman, Mississippi. It was the first body of law developed in the Fifth Circuit that abolished racial segregation in prisons and held that a variety of forms of corporal punishment against prisoners is considered cruel and unusual punishment in violation of the Eighth Amendment.
- Runyon v. McCrary, 427 U.S. 160 (1976) Private schools that discriminate on the basis of race or establish racial segregation are in violation of federal law.
- Regents of the University of California v. Bakke, 438 U.S. 265 (1978) Racial quotas in educational institutions violate the Equal Protection Clause, but a more narrowly tailored use of race in admission decisions may be permissible. (Partially overruled by Students for Fair Admissions v. Harvard (2023))
- Batson v. Kentucky, 476 U.S. 79 (1986) Prosecutors may not use peremptory challenges to dismiss jurors based on their race.
- Adarand Constructors, Inc. v. Peña, 515 U.S. 200 (1995) Race-based discrimination, including discrimination in favor of minorities (affirmative action), must pass strict scrutiny.
- Gratz v. Bollinger, 539 U.S. 244 (2003) The University of Michigan's “points system” of undergraduate affirmative action violated the Equal Protection Clause. Decided alongside Grutter v. Bollinger, which held constitutional the University of Michigan Law School's affirmative action program.
- Grutter v. Bollinger, 539 U.S. 306 (2003) A narrowly tailored use of race in student admission decisions may be permissible under the Equal Protection Clause because a diverse student body is beneficial to all students. This was hinted at in Regents v. Bakke (1978). (Overruled by Students for Fair Admissions v. Harvard (2023))
- Schuette v. Coalition to Defend Affirmative Action, 572 U.S. 291 (2014) A Michigan state constitutional amendment that bans affirmative action does not violate the Equal Protection Clause.
- Students for Fair Admissions v. Harvard, 600 U.S. 181 (2023) Race-based affirmative action programs in civilian college admissions processes at colleges and universities receiving federal funds violate the Equal Protection Clause.

=== Discrimination based on sex ===
- Muller v. Oregon, 208 U.S. 412 (1908) Oregon's restrictions on the working hours of women are constitutional under the Fourteenth Amendment because they are justified by the strong state interest in protecting women's health.
- Glasser v. United States, 315 U.S. 60 (1942) The exclusion of women from the jury pool, other than members of the League of Women Voters who have attended a jury training class, violates the fair cross-section requirement of the Impartial Jury Clause of the Sixth Amendment. Noteworthy for being the first majority opinion of the Court to use the phrase "cross-section of the community" and the first jury discrimination case to invoke the Sixth Amendment rather than Equal Protection Clause of the Fourteenth Amendment.
- Phillips v. Martin Marietta Corp., 400 U.S. 542 (1971) An employer may not, in the absence of business necessity, refuse to hire women with preschool-age children while hiring men with such children.
- Reed v. Reed, 404 U.S. 71 (1971) Administrators of estates cannot be named in a way that discriminates on the basis of sex; the first time the Equal Protection Clause had been read by the Supreme Court as applying to sex.
- Stanley v. Illinois, 405 U.S. 645 (1972) Laws that automatically make the children of unmarried fathers wards of the state after their mother dies, but not the other way around, are unconstitutional. The first case in which the Supreme Court found men faced sex discrimination.
- Frontiero v. Richardson, 411 U.S. 677 (1973) Sex-based discriminations are inherently suspect. A statute that automatically extends military benefits to the spouses of male members of the uniformed services, but requires the spouses of female members to prove they are dependent on the servicemember's income, is unconstitutional.
- Taylor v. Louisiana, 419 U.S. 522 (1975) Systematic exclusion of women from jury service on the basis of having to register for jury duty violates a criminal defendant's Sixth and Fourteenth Amendment rights.
- Craig v. Boren, 429 U.S. 190 (1976) Setting different minimum ages for females (18) and males (21) to be allowed to buy beer is unconstitutional sex-based discrimination contrary to the Equal Protection Clause of the Fourteenth Amendment.
- Mississippi University for Women v. Hogan, 458 U.S. 718 (1982) The single-sex admissions policy of the Mississippi University for Women's School of Nursing violated the Equal Protection Clause of the Fourteenth Amendment.
- Price Waterhouse v. Hopkins, 490 U.S. 228 (1989) Discrimination against an employee on the basis of sex stereotyping—that is, a person's nonconformity to social or other expectations of that person's gender—constitutes impermissible sex discrimination, in violation of Title VII of the Civil Rights Act of 1964. The employer bears the burden of proving that the adverse employment action would have been the same if sex discrimination had not occurred.
- J.E.B. v. Alabama ex rel. T.B., 511 U.S. 127 (1994) Prosecutors may not use peremptory challenges to dismiss jurors based on their sex.
- United States v. Virginia, 518 U.S. 515 (1996) Sex-based "separate but equal" military training facilities violate the Equal Protection Clause.
- Oncale v. Sundowner Offshore Services, 523 U.S. 75 (1998) The protection of Title VII of the Civil Rights Act of 1964 against workplace discrimination "because of... sex" applied to harassment in the workplace between members of the same sex.
- Burlington Northern & Santa Fe Railway Co. v. White, 548 U.S. 53 (2006) The anti-retaliation provision under Title VII of the Civil Rights Act of 1964 does not confine the actions and harms it forbids to those that are related to employment or occur at the workplace.

=== Discrimination based on sexual orientation or gender identity ===
- One, Inc. v. Olesen, 355 U.S. 371 (1958) Pro-homosexual writing is not per se obscene. This was the first Supreme Court ruling to deal with homosexuality and the first to address free speech rights with respect to homosexuality.
- Bowers v. Hardwick, 478 U.S. 186 (1986) A Georgia law that criminalizes certain acts of private sexual conduct between homosexual persons does not violate the Fourteenth Amendment. (Overruled by Lawrence v. Texas (2003))
- Romer v. Evans, 517 U.S. 620 (1996) A Colorado state constitutional amendment that prevents homosexuals and bisexuals from being able to obtain protections under the law is a violation of the Equal Protection Clause of the Fourteenth Amendment.
- Lawrence v. Texas, 539 U.S. 558 (2003) A Texas law that criminalizes consensual same-sex sexual conduct furthers no legitimate state interest and violates homosexuals' right to privacy under the Due Process Clause of the Fourteenth Amendment. This decision invalidates all of the remaining sodomy laws in the United States.
- Goodridge v. Department of Public Health, 440 Mass. 309 (2003) The denial of marriage licenses to same-sex couples violates provisions of the state constitution guaranteeing individual liberty and equality and is not rationally related to a legitimate state interest. This was the first state court decision in which same-sex couples won the right to marry.
- United States v. Windsor, 570 U.S. 744 (2013) Section 3 of the Defense of Marriage Act (1 U.S.C. § 7), which defines—for federal law purposes—the terms "marriage" and "spouse" to apply only to marriages between one man and one woman, is a deprivation of the equal liberty of the person protected by the Due Process Clause of the Fifth Amendment. The federal government must recognize same-sex marriages that have been approved by the states. The legal provision of the Defense of Marriage Act which was the issue in this case was eventually repealed by section 3 of the Respect for Marriage Act and replaced by section 5 of the Respect for Marriage Act (1 U.S.C. § 7).
- SmithKline Beecham Corporation v. Abbott Laboratories, 740 F.3d 471 (9th Cir. 2014) The Equal Protection Clause prohibits peremptory strikes to dismiss jurors based on their sexual orientation. This was the first holding by a federal appeals court that classifications based on sexual orientation must be subjected to heightened scrutiny.
- Obergefell v. Hodges, 576 U.S. 644 (2015) The Fourteenth Amendment requires a state to license a marriage between two people of the same sex with all the accompanying rights and responsibilities and to recognize a marriage between two people of the same sex when their marriage was lawfully licensed and performed out-of-state.
- Bostock v. Clayton County, 590 U.S. 644 (2020) Title VII of the Civil Rights Act of 1964 protects employees against discrimination due to their sexual orientation or gender identity.

=== Power of Congress to enforce civil rights ===
- Civil Rights Cases, 109 U.S. 3 (1883) Neither the Thirteenth nor the Fourteenth Amendment empower Congress to safeguard blacks against the actions of private individuals. (Partially overruled by Jones v. Alfred H. Mayer Co.)
- Heart of Atlanta Motel, Inc. v. United States, 379 U.S. 241 (1964) The Civil Rights Act of 1964 applies to places of public accommodation patronized by interstate travelers by reason of the Commerce Clause.
- Katzenbach v. McClung, 379 U.S. 294 (1964) The power of Congress to regulate interstate commerce extends to a restaurant that is not patronized by interstate travelers but which serves food that has moved in interstate commerce. This ruling makes the Civil Rights Act of 1964 apply to virtually all businesses.
- South Carolina v. Katzenbach, 383 U.S. 301 (1966) The Voting Rights Act of 1965 is a valid exercise of Congress's power under Section 2 of the Fifteenth Amendment.
- Katzenbach v. Morgan, 384 U.S. 641 (1966) Congress may enact laws stemming from Section 5 of the Fourteenth Amendment that increase the rights of citizens beyond what the judiciary has recognized.
- Jones v. Alfred H. Mayer Co., 392 U.S. 409 (1968) Section 1978 of the Revised Statutes, part of the Civil Rights Act of 1866, is constitutional under the Thirteenth Amendment and prohibits all racial discrimination in the sale or rental of property.
- City of Boerne v. Flores, 521 U.S. 507 (1997) Section 5 of the Fourteenth Amendment does not permit Congress to substantially increase the scope of the rights determined by the judiciary. Congress may only enact remedial or preventative measures that are consistent with the Fourteenth Amendment interpretations of the Supreme Court.
- Shelby County v. Holder, 570 U.S. 529 (2013) Section 4 of the Voting Rights Act of 1965 (15 U.S.C. § 10303) is unconstitutional; its coverage formula can no longer be used as a basis for subjecting jurisdictions to preclearance. Section 4(b) of the Voting Rights Act of 1965, which contains the coverage formula that determines which state and local jurisdictions are subjected to federal preclearance from the Department of Justice before implementing any changes to their voting laws or practices based on their histories of racial discrimination in voting, is unconstitutional because it no longer reflects current societal conditions.

=== Immunity from civil rights violations ===
- Monroe v. Pape, 365 U.S. 167 (1961) While municipalities can not be liable under the Civil Rights Act of 1871, individuals acting "under color of law" can be sued for damages for denying the constitutional rights of individuals. (Partially overruled in Monell v. Department of Social Services of the City of New York, 436 U.S. 658 (1978))
- Pierson v. Ray, 386 U.S. 547 (1967) Police officers are protected from being sued for civil rights violations under Section 1983 by the doctrine of qualified immunity.
- Stump v. Sparkman, 435 U.S. 349 (1978) A judge will not be deprived of judicial immunity because the action he took was in error, was done maliciously, or was in excess of his authority. He will be subject to liability only when he has acted in the clear absence of all jurisdiction.
- Monell v. Department of Social Services of the City of New York, 436 U.S. 658 (1978) Municipalities can be held liable for violations of Constitutional rights through 42 U.S.C. § 1983 actions. §1983 claims against municipal entities must be based on implementation of a policy or custom.
- Harris v. Harvey, 605 F.2d 330 (7th Cir. 1979) The Seventh Circuit established that a judge engaging in acts of public defamation inspired by racial prejudice is not protected by judicial immunity and therefore a civil lawsuit against a judge can be brought under the Enforcement Act of 1871 (42 U.S.C. § 1983).
- Will v. Michigan Department of State Police, 491 U.S. 58 (1989) Neither States nor state officials acting in their official capacities are "persons" within the meaning of 42 U.S.C. § 1983 when being sued for monetary damages.

=== Birth control and abortion ===
- Griswold v. Connecticut, 381 U.S. 479 (1965) A Connecticut law that criminalizes the use of contraception by married couples is unconstitutional because all Americans have a constitutionally protected right to privacy.
- Eisenstadt v. Baird, 405 U.S. 438 (1972) A Massachusetts law that criminalizes the use of contraception by unmarried couples violates the right to privacy established in Griswold as well as the Equal Protection Clause of the Fourteenth Amendment.
- Roe v. Wade, 410 U.S. 113 (1973) Laws that restrict a woman's ability to have an abortion prior to viability are unconstitutional. Most restrictions during the first trimester are prohibited, and only health-related restrictions are permitted during the second trimester. (Partially overruled by Planned Parenthood v. Casey (1992) and fully overruled by Dobbs v. Jackson Women's Health Organization (2022))
- Carey v. Population Services International, 431 U.S. 678 (1977) Laws that restrict the sale, distribution, and advertisement of contraception to both adults and minors are unconstitutional.
- Planned Parenthood v. Casey, 505 U.S. 833 (1992) A woman is still able to have an abortion before viability, but several restrictions are now permitted during the first trimester. The strict trimester framework of Roe is discarded and replaced with the more flexible "undue burden test". (Overruled by Dobbs v. Jackson Women's Health Organization (2022))
- Stenberg v. Carhart, 530 U.S. 914 (2000) Laws that ban partial-birth abortion are unconstitutional if they do not make an exception for the woman's health or if they cannot be reasonably construed to apply only to the partial-birth abortion procedure and not to other abortion methods.
- Gonzales v. Carhart, 550 U.S. 124 (2007) The Partial-Birth Abortion Ban Act of 2003 is constitutional because it is less ambiguous than the law that was struck down in Stenberg. It is not vague or overbroad, and it does not impose an undue burden on a woman's right to choose to have an abortion.
- Whole Woman's Health v. Hellerstedt, 579 U.S. 582 (2016) Clarified the undue burden standard, which was developed in the 1983 case City of Akron v. Akron Center for Reproductive Health and applied in the 1992 case Planned Parenthood v. Casey. (Overruled by Dobbs v. Jackson Women's Health Organization (2022))
- Dobbs v. Jackson Women's Health Organization, 597 U.S. 215 (2022) The constitution does not confer a right to abortion, overruling both Roe v. Wade and Planned Parenthood v. Casey.

=== End of life ===
- Cruzan v. Director, Missouri Department of Health, 497 U.S. 261 (1990) When a family has requested the termination of life-sustaining treatments for their vegetative relative, the state may constitutionally oppose this request if there is a lack of evidence of a clear earlier wish by said relative.
- Washington v. Glucksberg, 521 U.S. 702 (1997) Washington's prohibition on assisted suicide is constitutional.
- Vacco v. Quill, 521 U.S. 793 (1997) New York's prohibition on assisted suicide does not violate the Equal Protection Clause.
- Gonzales v. Oregon, 546 U.S. 243 (2006) The Controlled Substances Act does not prevent physicians from being able to prescribe the drugs needed to perform assisted suicides under state law.

=== Citizenship ===
- Elk v. Wilkins, 112 U.S. 94 (1884) The Citizenship Clause of the Fourteenth Amendment does not give citizenship at birth to Native Americans born on Indian reservations.
- United States v. Wong Kim Ark, 169 U.S. 649 (1898) With only a few narrow exceptions, every person born in the United States acquires United States citizenship at birth via the Citizenship Clause of the Fourteenth Amendment.
- Afroyim v. Rusk, 387 U.S. 253 (1967) The right of citizenship is protected by the Citizenship Clause of the Fourteenth Amendment. Congress has no power under the Constitution to revoke the American citizenship of any person unless the person relinquishes it voluntarily.
- Trump v. Barbara 609 U.S. 1 (2026) Children born in the United States to parents unlawfully or temporarily present are “subject to the jurisdiction” of the United States and are citizens at birth under the Citizenship Clause of the Fourteenth Amendment.

=== Freedom of movement ===
- Crandall v. Nevada, 73 U.S. 35 (1868) Freedom of movement between states is a fundamental right; a state cannot inhibit people from leaving it by imposing a tax on doing so.
- United States v. Wheeler, 254 U.S. 281 (1920) The Constitution grants to the states the power to prosecute individuals for wrongful interference with the right to travel.
- Edwards v. California, 314 U.S. 160 (1941) A state cannot prohibit indigent people from moving into it.
- Kent v. Dulles, 357 U.S. 116 (1958) The right to travel is a part of the "liberty" of which the citizen cannot be deprived without due process of law under the Fifth Amendment.
- Aptheker v. Secretary of State, 378 U.S. 500 (1964) Section 6 of the Subversive Activities Control Act of 1950, which makes it a crime for any member of a communist organization to attempt to use or obtain a passport, is an unconstitutional abridgment of the right to travel.
- United States v. Guest, 383 U.S. 745 (1966) There is a constitutional right to travel from state to state, and the protections of the Fourteenth Amendment extend to citizens who suffer deprivations of their rights at the hands of a private conspiracy where there is state participation in the conspiracy, no matter how minimal.
- Shapiro v. Thompson, 394 U.S. 618 (1969) The fundamental right to travel and the Equal Protection Clause forbid a state from reserving welfare benefits only for persons that have resided in the state for at least one year.
- Saenz v. Roe, 526 U.S. 489 (1999) A California law that limits new residents' benefits for the first year they live in the state is an unconstitutional violation of their right to travel.

=== Restrictions on involuntary commitment ===
- Jackson v. Indiana, 406 U.S. 715 (1972) A state violates due process by involuntarily committing a criminal defendant for an indefinite period of time solely on the basis of their permanent incompetency to stand trial on the charges filed against them.
- O'Connor v. Donaldson, 422 U.S. 563 (1975) A state cannot constitutionally confine a non-dangerous individual who is capable of surviving safely in freedom by themselves or with the help of willing and responsible family members or friends.
- Addington v. Texas, 441 U.S. 418 (1979) Clear and convincing evidence is required by the Fourteenth Amendment in a civil proceeding brought under state law to commit an individual involuntarily for an indefinite period to a state mental hospital.
- Youngberg v. Romeo, 457 U.S. 307 (1982) Involuntarily committed residents have protected liberty interests under the Due Process Clause to reasonably safe conditions of confinement, freedom from unreasonable bodily restraints, and such minimally adequate training as reasonably may be required by these interests.

=== Public health and safety ===
- Compagnie Francaise de Navigation a Vapeur v. Louisiana Board of Health, 186 U.S. 380 (1902) A state's police power to enforce quarantine laws extends to restricting the movements of uninfected individuals.
- Jacobson v. Massachusetts, 197 U.S. 11 (1905) Individual liberty is not absolute, and a state's police power must be held to embrace at least such reasonable regulations established directly by legislative enactment to protect public health and safety, which extends to compulsory vaccination laws.
- Zucht v. King, 260 U.S. 174 (1922) School districts can constitutionally exclude unvaccinated students.
- Buck v. Bell, 274 U.S. 200 (1927) State statutes permitting compulsory sterilization of the unfit, including the intellectually disabled, "for the protection and health of the state" did not violate the Due Process Clause of the Fourteenth Amendment. (Partially overruled by Skinner v. Oklahoma (1942) and fully by the Americans with Disabilities Act of 1990)
- Prince v. Massachusetts, 321 U.S. 158 (1944) States have broad authority to regulate the actions and treatment of children. Parental authority is not absolute and can be permissibly restricted if doing so is in the interests of a child's welfare. While children share many of the rights of adults, they face different potential harms from similar activities. Compulsory vaccination is an example of a fundamental police power.
- Workman v. Mingo County Board of Education, 419 Fed. Appx. 348 (4th Cir. 2011) States are not constitutionally required to provide a religious exemption to mandatory vaccination for school attendance.

=== Other areas ===
- Corfield v. Coryell, 6 Fed. Cas. 546 (C.C.E.D. Pa. 1823) Some of the rights protected by the Privileges and Immunities Clause include the freedom of movement through the states, the right of access to the courts, the right to purchase and hold property, an exemption from higher taxes than those paid by state residents, and the right to vote. This case was decided by Supreme Court Justice Bushrod Washington while riding circuit in the Circuit Court for the Eastern District of Pennsylvania. It is notable for Washington asserting the existence of cognizable rights within the ambit of the Privileges and Immunities Clause that are nowhere within the Constitution's text.
- Ex parte Milligan, 71 U.S. 2 (1866) Trying citizens in military courts is unconstitutional when civilian courts are still operating. Trial by military tribunal is constitutional only when there is no power left but the military, and the military may validly try criminals only as long as is absolutely necessary.
- The Insular Cases, 182 U.S. 1 (1901) Full constitutional protections are not automatically granted to all United States territories. The Constitution only partially applies to unincorporated territories.
- Kinsella v. Krueger, 351 U.S. 470 (1956) The Constitution supersedes international treaties ratified by the United States Senate. The military may not try the civilian wife of a soldier under military jurisdiction.
- Reid v. Covert, 354 U.S. 1 (1957) United States citizens abroad, even when associated with the military, cannot be deprived of the protections of the Constitution and cannot be made subject to military jurisdiction.
- Trans World Airlines, Inc. v. Hardison, 432 U.S. 63 (1977) An employer may discharge an employee who observes a seventh-day sabbath, and that such employee is not entitled to equal employment opportunity protection under Title VII of the Civil Rights Act of 1964, which makes it an unlawful employment practice for an employer to discriminate against an employee on the basis of his religion.
- Plyler v. Doe, 457 U.S. 202 (1982) The government lacks a substantial interest in excluding from K-12 public schools children who were not legally admitted into the country.

== Criminal law ==
=== Fourth Amendment rights ===
- Weeks v. United States, 232 U.S. 383 (1914) Exclusionary rule, under which evidence obtained in violation of the Constitution cannot be admitted at trial, formulated for federal prosecutions.
- Silverthorne Lumber Co. v. United States, 251 U.S. 385 (1920) All evidence developed and obtained based on evidence obtained unconstitutionally is "fruit of the poisonous tree" and cannot be used at trial.
- Olmstead v. United States, 277 U.S. 438 (1928) The Fourth Amendment's proscription on unreasonable search and seizure does not apply to telephone wiretaps. (Overruled by Katz v. United States (1967))
- Mapp v. Ohio, 367 U.S. 643 (1961) Exclusionary rule applied to state prosecutions.
- Schmerber v. California, 384 U.S. 757 (1966) The application of the Fourth Amendment's protection against warrantless searches and the Fifth Amendment privilege against self incrimination to searches that intrude into the human body means that police may not conduct warrantless blood testing on suspects absent an emergency that justifies acting without a warrant.
- Katz v. United States, 389 U.S. 347 (1967) The Fourth Amendment's ban on unreasonable searches and seizures applies to all places where an individual has a "reasonable expectation of privacy."
- Terry v. Ohio, 392 U.S. 1 (1968) Police may stop a person if they have a reasonable suspicion that the person has committed or is about to commit a crime and frisk the suspect for weapons if they have a reasonable suspicion that the suspect is armed and dangerous without violating the Fourth Amendment.
- Mancusi v. DeForte, 392 U.S. 364 (1968) The privacy rights defined in Katz extend to the workplace.
- Bivens v. Six Unknown Named Agents, 403 U.S. 388 (1971) Individuals may sue federal government officials who have violated their Fourth Amendment rights even though such a suit is not authorized by law. The existence of a remedy for the violation is implied from the importance of the right that is violated.
- United States v. United States District Court for the Eastern District of Michigan, 407 U.S. 297 (1972) Government officials must obtain a warrant before beginning electronic surveillance even if domestic security issues are involved. The "inherent vagueness of the domestic security concept" and the potential for abusing it to quell political dissent make the Fourth Amendment's protections especially important when the government spies on its own citizens.
- Illinois v. Gates, 462 U.S. 213 (1983) The totality of the circumstances, rather than a rigid test, must be used in finding probable cause under the Fourth Amendment.
- Nix v. Williams, 467 U.S. 431 (1984) Creates the inevitable discovery exception to the Fourth Amendment, under which evidence that might otherwise be suppressed as unconstitutionally obtained can be included if the state can demonstrate that it would reasonably have been found in any event.
- New Jersey v. T. L. O., 469 U.S. 325 (1985) The Fourth Amendment's ban on unreasonable searches applies to those conducted by public school officials as well as those conducted by law enforcement personnel, but public school officials can use the less strict standard of reasonable suspicion instead of probable cause.
- O'Connor v. Ortega, 480 U.S. 709 (1987) In the absence of reasonable workplace policy to the contrary, the Fourth Amendment applies to searches of public employees, their belongings or workplaces by their superiors if done with reasonable suspicion for administrative reasons.
- Vernonia School District 47J v. Acton, 515 U.S. 646 (1995) Schools may implement random drug testing upon students participating in school-sponsored athletics.
- Ohio v. Robinette, 519 U.S. 33 (1996) The Fourth Amendment does not require police officers to inform a motorist at the end of a traffic stop that they are free to go before seeking permission to search the motorist's car.
- Board of Education v. Earls, 536 U.S. 822 (2002) Coercive drug testing imposed by school districts upon students who participate in extracurricular activities does not violate the Fourth Amendment.
- Georgia v. Randolph, 547 U.S. 103 (2006) Police cannot conduct a warrantless search in a home where one occupant consents and the other objects.
- In re Directives, (2008) According to the United States Foreign Intelligence Surveillance Court of Review, an exception to the Fourth Amendment's warrant requirement exists when surveillance is conducted to obtain foreign intelligence for national security purposes and is directed against foreign powers or agents of foreign powers reasonably believed to be located outside the United States.
- United States v. Jones, 565 U.S. 400 (2012) Attaching a GPS device to a vehicle and then using the device to monitor the vehicle's movements constitutes a search under the Fourth Amendment.
- Riley v. California, 573 U.S. 373 (2014) Police must obtain a warrant in order to search digital information on a cell phone seized from an individual who has been arrested.
- Carpenter v. United States, 585 U.S. 296 (2018) Government acquisition of cell-site records is a Fourth Amendment search, and, thus, generally requires a warrant.

=== Right to counsel ===
- Powell v. Alabama, 287 U.S. 45 (1932) Under the Due Process Clause of the 14th Amendment, a state must inform illiterate defendants charged with a capital crime that they have a right to be represented by counsel and must appoint counsel for defendants who cannot afford to hire a lawyer and give counsel adequate time to prepare for trial.
- Glasser v. United States, 315 U.S. 60 (1942) A defense lawyer's conflict of interest arising from a simultaneous representation of codefendants violates the Assistance of Counsel Clause of the Sixth Amendment.
- Betts v. Brady, 316 U.S. 455 (1942) Indigent defendants may be denied counsel when prosecuted by a state. (Overruled by Gideon v. Wainwright (1963))
- Gideon v. Wainwright, 372 U.S. 335 (1963) All defendants have the right to an attorney and must be provided one by the state if they are unable to afford legal counsel.
- Escobedo v. Illinois, 378 U.S. 478 (1964) A person in police custody has the right to speak to an attorney.
- Miranda v. Arizona, 384 U.S. 436 (1966) Police must advise criminal suspects of their rights under the Constitution to remain silent, to consult with a lawyer, and to have one appointed to them if they are indigent. A police interrogation must stop if the suspect states that they wish to remain silent.
- In re Gault, 387 U.S. 1 (1967) Juvenile defendants are protected under the Due Process Clause of the Fourteenth Amendment.
- Goss v. Lopez, 419 U.S. 565 (1975) A public school subjecting a student to suspension without conducting a hearing violates the Due Process Clause of the Fourteenth Amendment.
- Michigan v. Jackson, 475 U.S. 625 (1986) If a police interrogation begins after a defendant asserts their right to counsel at an arraignment or similar proceeding, then any waiver of that right for that police-initiated interrogation is invalid. (Overruled by Montejo v. Louisiana (2009))
- Montejo v. Louisiana, 556 U.S. 778 (2009) A defendant may waive their right to counsel during a police interrogation even if the interrogation begins after the defendant's assertion of their right to counsel at an arraignment or similar proceeding.

=== Other rights regarding counsel ===
- Strickland v. Washington, 466 U.S. 668 (1984) To obtain relief due to ineffective assistance of counsel, a criminal defendant must show that counsel's performance fell below an objective standard of reasonableness and that counsel's deficient performance gives rise to a reasonable probability that, if counsel had performed adequately, the result of the proceeding would have been different.
- Padilla v. Kentucky, 559 U.S. 356 (2010) Criminal defense attorneys are duty-bound to inform clients of the risk of deportation under three circumstances. First, where the law is unambiguous, attorneys must advise their criminal clients that deportation "will" result from a conviction. Second, where the immigration consequences of a conviction are unclear or uncertain, attorneys must advise that deportation "may" result. Finally, attorneys must give their clients some advice about deportation—counsel cannot remain silent about immigration consequences.

=== Right to remain silent ===
- Berghuis v. Thompkins, 560 U.S. 370 (2010) The right to remain silent does not exist unless a suspect invokes it unambiguously.
- Salinas v. Texas, 570 U.S. 178 (2013) The Fifth Amendment's protection against self-incrimination does not protect an individual's refusal to answer questions asked by law enforcement before the individual has been arrested or given the Miranda warning. A witness cannot invoke the privilege by simply standing mute; the witness must expressly invoke it.

=== Competence ===
- Dusky v. United States, 362 U.S. 402 (1960) A defendant has the right to a competency evaluation before proceeding to trial.
- Rogers v. Okin, 478 F. Supp. 1342 (D. Mass. 1979) The competence of a committed patient is presumed until they are adjudicated incompetent.
- Ford v. Wainwright, 477 U.S. 399 (1986) A defendant has the right to a competency evaluation before being executed.
- Godinez v. Moran, 509 U.S. 389 (1993) A defendant who is competent to stand trial is automatically competent to plead guilty or waive the right to legal counsel.
- Sell v. United States, 539 U.S. 166 (2003) The Supreme Court laid down four criteria for cases involving the involuntary administration of medication to an incompetent pretrial defendant.
- Kahler v. Kansas, 589 U.S. 271 (2020) The Constitution's Due Process Clause does not necessarily compel the acquittal of any defendant who, because of mental illness, could not tell right from wrong when committing their crime.

=== Detention of terrorism suspects ===
- Rasul v. Bush, 542 U.S. 466 (2004) The federal court system has the authority to decide if foreign nationals held at Guantanamo Bay were wrongfully imprisoned.
- Hamdi v. Rumsfeld, 542 U.S. 507 (2004) The federal government has the power to detain those it designates as enemy combatants, including United States citizens, but detainees that are United States citizens must have the rights of due process and the ability to challenge their enemy combatant status before an impartial authority.
- Hamdan v. Rumsfeld, 548 U.S. 557 (2006) The military commissions set up by the Bush administration to try detainees at Guantanamo Bay detention camp are illegal because they lack the protections that are required by the Geneva Conventions and the Uniform Code of Military Justice.
- Boumediene v. Bush, 553 U.S. 723 (2008) Section 7 of the Military Commissions Act of 2006 is unconstitutional because foreign terrorism suspects held at Guantanamo Bay have the constitutional right to challenge their detention in United States courts.

=== Capital punishment ===
- Louisiana ex rel. Francis v. Resweber, 329 U.S. 459 (1947) A condemned person does not suffer double jeopardy when he is executed again after the failure of the first attempt.
- Witherspoon v. Illinois, 391 U.S. 510 (1968) Stacking the jury with only jurors who would choose the death penalty violates the Sixth Amendment because it is not an impartial jury or a cross-section of the community.
- People v. Anderson, 493 P.2d 880, 6 Cal. 3d 628 (Cal. 1972) The use of capital punishment in the state of California was deemed unconstitutional because it was considered cruel or unusual.
- Furman v. Georgia, 408 U.S. 238 (1972) The arbitrary and inconsistent imposition of the death penalty violates the Eighth and Fourteenth Amendments and constitutes cruel and unusual punishment. This decision initiates a nationwide de facto moratorium on executions that lasts until the Supreme Court's decision in Gregg v. Georgia (1976).
- Gregg v. Georgia, 428 U.S. 153 (1976) Georgia's new death penalty statute is constitutional because it adequately narrows the class of defendants eligible for the death penalty. This case and the next four cases were consolidated and decided simultaneously. By evaluating the new death penalty statutes that had been passed by the states, the Supreme Court ended the moratorium on executions that began with its decision in Furman v. Georgia (1972).
- Proffitt v. Florida, 428 U.S. 242 (1976) Florida's new death penalty statute is constitutional because it requires the comparison of aggravating factors to mitigating factors in order to impose a death sentence.
- Jurek v. Texas, 428 U.S. 262 (1976) Texas's new death penalty statute is constitutional because it uses a three-part test to determine if a death sentence should be imposed.
- Woodson v. North Carolina, 428 U.S. 280 (1976) North Carolina's new death penalty statute is unconstitutional because it calls for a mandatory death sentence to be imposed.
- Roberts v. Louisiana, 428 U.S. 325 (1976) Louisiana's new death penalty statute is unconstitutional because it calls for a mandatory death sentence for a large range of crimes.
- Coker v. Georgia, 433 U.S. 584 (1977) A death sentence may not be imposed for the crime of rape.
- Enmund v. Florida, 458 U.S. 782 (1982) A death sentence may not be imposed on offenders who are involved in a felony during which a murder is committed but who do not actually kill, attempt to kill, or intend that a killing take place.
- Ford v. Wainwright, 477 U.S. 399 (1986) A death sentence may not be imposed on defendants who are deemed to be legally insane.
- Tison v. Arizona, 481 U.S. 137 (1987) The death penalty is an appropriate punishment for a felony murderer who did not intend to cause the death, but was a major participant in the underlying felony and exhibited a reckless indifference to human life.
- McCleskey v. Kemp, 481 U.S. 279 (1987) Evidence of a "racially-disproportionate impact" in the application of the death penalty indicated by a comprehensive scientific study is not enough to invalidate an individual's death sentence without showing a "racially discriminatory purpose."
- Stanford v. Kentucky, 492 U.S. 361 (1989) The imposition of capital punishment on an individual for a crime committed at 16 or 17 years of age does not constitute cruel and unusual punishment under the Eighth Amendment. (Overruled by Roper v. Simmons (2005))
- Breard v. Greene, 523 U.S. 371 (1998) The International Court of Justice does not have jurisdiction in capital punishment cases that involve foreign nationals.
- Atkins v. Virginia, 536 U.S. 304 (2002) A death sentence may not be imposed on intellectually disabled offenders, but the states can define what it means to be intellectually disabled.
- Roper v. Simmons, 543 U.S. 551 (2005) A death sentence may not be imposed on juvenile offenders.
- Baze v. Rees, 553 U.S. 35 (2008) The three-drug cocktail used for performing executions by lethal injection in Kentucky (as well as virtually all of the states using lethal injection at the time) is constitutional under the Eighth Amendment.
- Kennedy v. Louisiana, 554 U.S. 407 (2008) The death penalty is unconstitutional in all cases that do not involve homicide or crimes against the state such as treason and "drug kingpin activity".
- Glossip v. Gross, 576 U.S. 863 (2015) The Eighth Amendment requires prisoners to show 1.) there is a known and available alternative method of execution and 2.) the challenged method of execution poses a demonstrated risk of severe pain, with the burden of proof resting on the prisoners, not the state.
- Bucklew v. Precythe, 587 U.S. 119 (2019) Baze v. Rees and Glossip v. Gross govern all Eighth Amendment challenges alleging that a method of execution inflicts unconstitutionally cruel pain. When a convict sentenced to death challenges the State's method of execution due to claims of excessive pain, the convict must show that other alternative methods of execution exist and clearly demonstrate they would cause less pain than the state-determined one.

=== Other criminal sentences ===
- Apodaca v. Oregon, 406 U.S. 404 (1972) The Sixth Amendment does not require a unanimous decision for conviction in jury trials. (Overruled by Ramos v. Louisiana (2020))
- Morrissey v. Brewer, 408 U.S. 471 (1972) The Supreme Court extended Fourteenth Amendment due process protection to the parole revocation process, hold that the due process clause of the Fourteenth Amendment requires a "neutral and detached" hearing body such as a parole board to give an evidentiary hearing prior to revoking the parole of a defendant and spelled out the minimum due process requirements for the revocation hearing.
- Gagnon v. Scarpelli, 411 U.S. 778 (1973) The Supreme Court issued a substantive ruling regarding the rights of individuals in violation of a probation or parole sentence. It held that a previously sentenced probationer is entitled to a hearing when his probation is revoked. More specifically the Supreme Court held that a preliminary and final revocation of probation hearings are required by Due Process; the judicial body overseeing the revocation hearings shall determine if the probationer or parolee requires counsel; denying representation of counsel must be documented in the record of the Court.
- Wolff v. McDonnell, 418 U.S. 539 (1974) In administrative proceedings regarding discipline, prisoners retain some of their due process rights. When a prison disciplinary hearing might result in the loss of good-time credits, due process requires that the prison notify the prisoner in advance of the hearing, afford him an opportunity to call witnesses and present documentary evidence in his defense, and furnish him with a written statement of the evidence relied on and the reason for the disciplinary action.
- Bearden v. Georgia, 461 U.S. 660 (1983) A sentencing court cannot properly revoke a defendant's probation for failure to pay a fine and make restitution, absent evidence and findings that he was somehow responsible for the failure or that alternative forms of punishment were inadequate to meet the State's interest in punishment and deterrence.
- Apprendi v. New Jersey, 530 U.S. 466 (2000) Other than the fact of a prior conviction, any fact that increases the penalty for a crime beyond the prescribed statutory maximum must be submitted to a jury and proved beyond a reasonable doubt.
- Blakely v. Washington, 542 U.S. 296 (2004) Mandatory state sentencing guidelines are the statutory maximum for purposes of applying the Apprendi rule.
- United States v. Booker, 543 U.S. 220 (2005) Blakely v. Washington applies to the Federal Sentencing Guidelines and requires all facts that increase the defendant's punishment beyond the Guidelines range applicable to the offense of conviction to be proved to a jury beyond a reasonable doubt. As a result, the provision of the federal sentencing statute that makes the Guidelines mandatory is stricken, and in imposing sentences, district courts must instead focus on a broader range; appellate courts are to review sentences for "reasonableness."
- Graham v. Florida, 560 U.S. 48 (2010) A sentence of life imprisonment without the possibility of parole may not be imposed on juvenile non-homicide offenders.
- Miller v. Alabama, 567 U.S. 460 (2012) A sentence of life imprisonment without the possibility of parole may not be a mandatory sentence for juvenile offenders.
- Ramos v. Louisiana, 590 U.S. 83 (2020) The Sixth Amendment right to jury trial is read as requiring a unanimous verdict to convict a defendant of a serious offense and is an incorporated right to the states.

=== Other areas ===
- United States v. Hudson, 11 U.S. 32 (1812) Congress must pass laws criminalizing activities. Common law crimes do not exist on the federal level.
- Hurtado v. California, 110 U.S. 516 (1884) State governments, as distinguished from the federal government, need not use grand juries in criminal prosecutions.
- Moore v. Dempsey, 261 U.S. 86 (1923) Mob violence at criminal trials, such as those that followed the Elaine massacre, is a violation of due process. First 20th-century case where the Court protected the rights of Blacks in the South, and one of its first to review a criminal conviction for constitutionality.
- Sorrells v. United States, 287 U.S. 435 (1932) Entrapment is a valid defense to a criminal charge.
- Brown v. Mississippi, 297 U.S. 278 (1936) Confessions obtained through physical force and torture are inadmissible at trial.
- Chambers v. Florida, 309 U.S. 227 (1940) Confessions compelled by police through duress are inadmissible at trial.
- United States v. Morgan, 346 U.S. 502 (1954) The writ of coram nobis is the proper application to request federal post-conviction judicial review for those who have completed the conviction's incarceration in order to challenge the validity of a federal criminal conviction.
- Thompson v. City of Louisville, 362 U.S. 199 (1960) Criminal convictions are unconstitutional when no element of the offense has been proven.
- Robinson v. California, 370 U.S. 660 (1962) Punishing a person for a medical condition is a violation of the Eighth Amendment. The protection from cruel and unusual punishment is incorporated against the states.
- Brady v. Maryland, 373 U.S. 83 (1963) The prosecution must turn over all evidence that might exonerate the defendant (exculpatory evidence) to the defense.
- Duncan v. Louisiana, 391 U.S. 145 (1968) The Sixth Amendment right to a criminal jury trial is incorporated and applied it to the states.
- Barker v. Wingo, 407 U.S. 514 (1972) The Supreme Court laid down a four-part case-by-case balancing test for determining whether the defendant's speedy trial right under the Sixth Amendment has been violated.
- Aleman v. Circuit Court of Cook County, 138 F.3d 302 (7th Cir., 1998) A defendant who is found after acquittal to have benefited from corrupt or undue influence on the trier(s) of fact can be retried for the offense after such corruption has been discovered; the state has a right to an honest trial. A retrial in these circumstances does not constitute double jeopardy since the defendant was never truly in jeopardy during the first trial; this is one of only two circumstances where the same jurisdiction may retry a defendant who has been acquitted.
- Crawford v. Washington, 541 U.S. 36 (2004) The Supreme Court held that the admission of "testimonial" hearsay in a criminal trial violates the defendant's Sixth Amendment right to confront the witnesses against him unless the declarant is unavailable to testify at trial and the defendant had a prior opportunity to cross-examine the declarant.
- City of Grants Pass v. Johnson, No. 23-175, 603 U.S. ___ (2024) Local ordinances penalizing camping on public land do not constitute cruel and unusual punishment towards homeless people.

== Civil procedure ==
=== Personal jurisdiction ===
- Pennoyer v. Neff, 95 U.S. 714 (1878) A state can only exercise personal jurisdiction over an out of state defendant if they are served with process within the bounds of the state. Quasi in rem jurisdiction can only be established over property within the state if it was 'brought under the control of the court' by the time the suit commenced. This decision was modified by later cases, but remains the underlying basis for much of federal personal jurisdiction.
- International Shoe Co. v. Washington, 326 U.S. 310 (1945) Personal jurisdiction can be established over a defendant if that defendant has "minimum contacts" with a state "such that the maintenance of the suit does not offend traditional notions of fair play and substantial justice."
- World-Wide Volkswagen Corp. v. Woodson, 444 U.S. 286 (1980) It is not enough that it is foreseeable that a defendant's product could enter a particular state; they must "purposely avail" themselves of the jurisdiction in order to establish personal jurisdiction.
- Daimler AG v. Bauman, 571 U.S. 117 (2014) A corporate defendant is subject to general jurisdiction only in its place of incorporation and principal place of business.
- Bristol-Myers Squibb Co. v. Superior Court, 582 U.S. 255 (2017) State courts lack personal jurisdiction over defendants on claims brought by plaintiffs who don't reside in the state and whose claims did not arise in the state.
- Ford Motor Co. v. Montana Eighth Judicial District, 592 U.S. 351 (2021) A corporate defendant's purposeful availment of a state can lead to personal jurisdiction even when there is no direct causal connection, when the claims nonetheless 'arise out of or relate to' a defendant's contact with a state.
- Mallory v. Norfolk Southern Railway Co., 600 U.S. 122 (2023) Long arm statutes that subject defendants to personal jurisdiction in a particular state by doing business there do not violate the Due Process Clause.

== Federalism ==
- Chisholm v. Georgia, 2 U.S. 419 (1793) The Constitution prevents the states from exercising sovereign immunity. Therefore, the states can be sued in federal court by citizens of other states. This decision was voided by the Eleventh Amendment in 1795, just two years after it was handed down.
- Hylton v. United States, 3 U.S. 171 (1796) A tax on the possession of goods is not a direct tax that must be apportioned among the states according to their populations. This case featured the first example of judicial review by the Supreme Court.
- Ware v. Hylton, 3 U.S. 199 (1796) A section of the Treaty of Paris supersedes an otherwise valid Virginia statute under the Supremacy Clause. This case featured the first example of judicial nullification of a state law.
- Fletcher v. Peck, 10 U.S. 87 (1810) A state legislature can repeal a corruptly made law, but the Contract Clause of the Constitution prohibits the voiding of valid contracts made under such a law. This was the first case in which the Supreme Court struck down a state law as unconstitutional.
- Martin v. Hunter's Lessee, 14 U.S. 304 (1816) Federal courts may review state court decisions when they rest on federal law or the federal Constitution. This decision provides for the uniform interpretation of federal law throughout the states.
- McCulloch v. Maryland, 17 U.S. 316 (1819) The Necessary and Proper Clause of the Constitution grants to Congress implied powers for implementing the Constitution's express powers, and state actions may not impede valid exercises of power by the federal government.
- Cohens v. Virginia, 19 U.S. 264 (1821) State laws in opposition to national laws are void. The U.S. Supreme Court has appellate jurisdiction for any U.S. case and final say.
- Gibbons v. Ogden, 22 U.S. 1 (1824) The power to regulate interstate navigation is granted to Congress by the Commerce Clause of the Constitution.
- Barron v. Baltimore, 32 U.S. 243 (1833) The Bill of Rights cannot be applied to the state governments. This decision has essentially been rendered moot by the Supreme Court's adoption of the incorporation doctrine, which uses the Due Process Clause of the Fourteenth Amendment to apply portions of the Bill of Rights to the states.
- Cooley v. Board of Wardens, 53 U.S. 299 (1852) When local circumstances make it necessary, the states can regulate interstate commerce as long as such regulations do not conflict with federal law. State laws related to commerce powers can be valid if Congress is silent on the matter.
- Ableman v. Booth, 62 U.S. 506 (1859) State courts cannot issue rulings that contradict the decisions of federal courts.
- Texas v. White, 74 U.S. 700 (1869) The states that formed the Confederate States of America during the Civil War never actually left the Union because a state cannot unilaterally secede from the United States.
- Hans v. Louisiana, 134 U.S. 1 (1890) The Eleventh Amendment bars suits by citizens against their own state in federal court.
- Pollock v. Farmers' Loan & Trust Co., 157 U.S. 429 (1895) Income taxes on interest, dividends, and rents are, in effect, direct taxes that must be apportioned among the states according to their populations. This decision was voided by the Sixteenth Amendment in 1913, allowing taxes on unearned income to be implemented without apportionment.
- Swift and Company v. United States, 196 U.S. 375 (1905) Congress can prohibit local business practices in order to regulate interstate commerce because those practices, when combined, form a "stream of commerce" between the states.
- Hunter v. City of Pittsburgh, 207 U.S. 161 (1907) States have sovereignty over their local governments.
- Ex parte Young, 209 U.S. 123 (1908) When state officers are charged with violating federal law, they cannot set up the state's federal constitutional sovereign immunity to defeat suits for prospective relief.
- Hammer v. Dagenhart, 247 U.S. 251 (1918) Congress has no power under the Commerce Clause to regulate labor conditions. (Overruled by United States v. Darby Lumber Co. (1941))
- Missouri v. Holland, 252 U.S. 416 (1920) Treaties made by the federal government are supreme over any concerns brought by the states about such treaties interfering with any states' rights derived from the Tenth Amendment.
- Hawke v. Smith, 253 U.S. 221 (1920) States cannot ratify or rescind their ratification of federal constitutional amendments through referendums, only by votes of their legislatures.
- United States v. Wheeler, 254 U.S. 281 (1920) The Constitution grants to the states the power to prosecute individuals for wrongful interference with the right to travel.
- United States v. Butler, 297 U.S. 1 (1936) The U.S. Congress's power to lay taxes is not limited only to the level necessary to carry out its other powers enumerated in Article I of the U.S. Constitution, but is a broad authority to tax and spend for the "general welfare" of the United States.
- Carter v. Carter Coal Co., 298 U.S. 238 (1936) The Commerce Clause does not permit Congress to regulate manufacturing. Just because a product will be used in interstate commerce does not mean it can be regulated before that point. The last of the “Lochner era” decisions striking down numerous New Deal programs.
- National Labor Relations Board v. Jones & Laughlin Steel Corporation, 301 U.S. 1 (1937) The National Labor Relations Act and, by extension, the National Labor Relations Board are constitutional because the Commerce Clause applies to labor relations. Therefore, the NLRB has the right to sanction companies that fire or discriminate against workers for belonging to a union. Also, a local commercial activity that is considered in isolation may still constitute interstate commerce if that activity has a "close and substantial relationship" to interstate commerce.
- Steward Machine Company v. Davis, 301 U.S. 548 (1937) The federal government is permitted to impose a tax even if the goal of the tax is not just the collection of revenue.
- New Negro Alliance v. Sanitary Grocery Co., 303 U.S. 552 (1938) The Norris–La Guardia Act of 1932 prohibits employers from proscribing the peaceful dissemination of information concerning the terms and conditions of employment by those involved in an active labor dispute, even when such dissemination occurs on an employer's private property.
- United States v. Carolene Products Co. 304 U.S. 144 (1938) Economic regulations are presumptively constitutional under the rational basis test. Particularly notable for Footnote 4, which formulated the foundation for strict scrutiny review.
- United States v. Darby Lumber Co., 312 U.S. 100 (1941) Control over interstate commerce belongs entirely to Congress. The Fair Labor Standards Act of 1938 is constitutional under the Commerce Clause because it prevents the states from lowering labor standards to gain commercial advantages.
- Wickard v. Filburn, 317 U.S. 111 (1942) The Commerce Clause of the Constitution allows Congress to regulate anything that has a substantial economic effect on commerce even if that effect is indirect.
- Cooper v. Aaron, 358 U.S. 1 (1958) The states are bound by the decisions of the Supreme Court and cannot choose to ignore them.
- Oregon v. Mitchell, 400 U.S. 112 (1970) Congress has the power to regulate requirements for voting in federal elections, but it is prohibited from regulating requirements for voting in state and local elections. This decision preceded the ratification of the Twenty-sixth Amendment in 1971, which lowered the minimum voting age to 18 for all elections.
- Marquette National Bank of Minneapolis v. First of Omaha Service Corp., 439 U.S. 299 (1978) States may not cap the interest rates offered to their citizens by federally chartered banks based in other states; a holding that contributed greatly to the growth of the credit card industry in the ensuing decades.
- Garcia v. San Antonio Metropolitan Transit Authority, 469 U.S. 528 (1985) Congress has the power under the Commerce Clause of the Constitution to extend the Fair Labor Standards Act, which requires that employers provide minimum wage and overtime pay to their employees, to state and local governments.
- Heath v. Alabama, 474 U.S. 82 (1985) The Double Jeopardy Clause of the Fifth Amendment does not prohibit two different states from separately prosecuting and convicting the same individual for the same illegal act.
- South Dakota v. Dole, 483 U.S. 203 (1987) Congress may attach reasonable conditions to funds disbursed to the states without violating the Tenth Amendment.
- United States v. Lopez, 514 U.S. 549 (1995) The Gun-Free School Zones Act of 1990 is unconstitutional. The Commerce Clause of the Constitution does not give Congress the power to prohibit the mere possession of a gun near a school because gun possession by itself is not an economic activity that affects interstate commerce even indirectly. Notable because it was the first time since the New Deal that the Supreme Court invalidated a law which was passed by Congress ostensibly permissible under the Commerce Clause.
- U.S. Term Limits, Inc. v. Thornton, 514 U.S. 779 (1995) The states cannot create qualifications for prospective members of Congress that are stricter than those specified in the Constitution. This decision invalidates provisions that had imposed term limits on members of Congress in 23 states.
- Printz v. United States, 521 U.S. 898 (1997) The interim provision of the Brady Handgun Violence Prevention Act that requires state and local officials to conduct background checks on firearm purchasers violates the Tenth Amendment.
- United States v. Morrison, 529 U.S. 598 (2000) The section of the Violence Against Women Act of 1994 that gives victims of gender-motivated violence the right to sue their attackers in federal court is an unconstitutional intrusion on states' rights, and it cannot be saved by the Commerce Clause or Section 5 of the Fourteenth Amendment.
- Gonzales v. Raich, 545 U.S. 1 (2005) Congress may ban the use of marijuana even in states that have approved its use for medicinal purposes.
- Bond v. United States, 564 U.S. 211 (2011) An individual litigant has standing to challenge a federal statute on grounds of federalism.
- Arizona v. United States, 567 U.S. 387 (2012) An Arizona law that authorizes local law enforcement to enforce immigration laws is preempted by federal law. Arizona law enforcement may inquire about a resident's legal status during lawful encounters, but the state may not implement its own immigration laws.
- National Federation of Independent Business v. Sebelius, 567 U.S. 519 (2012) The Patient Protection and Affordable Care Act's expansion of Medicaid is unconstitutional as-written—it is unduly coercive to force the states to choose between participating in the expansion or forgoing all Medicaid funds. In addition, the individual health insurance mandate is constitutional by virtue of the Taxing and Spending Clause (though not by the Commerce Clause or the Necessary and Proper Clause).
- Bond v. United States, 572 U.S. 844 (2014) Both individuals and states can bring a Tenth Amendment challenge to federal law.
- Murphy v. National Collegiate Athletic Association, 584 U.S. 453 (2018) The Professional and Amateur Sports Protection Act of 1992 violates the Tenth Amendment because it prohibits the states from passing laws that authorize and regulate sports betting.

== Native American law ==
- Johnson v. McIntosh, 21 U.S. 543 (1823) Private citizens cannot purchase lands from Native Americans.
- Worcester v. Georgia, 31 U.S. 515 (1832) The Supreme Court laid out the relationship between tribes and the state and federal governments. It is considered to have built the foundations of the doctrine of tribal sovereignty in the United States, because the relationship between the Indian Nations and the United States is that of nations.
- Ex parte Crow Dog, 109 U.S. 556 (1883) U.S. courts do not have criminal jurisdiction in cases where one Native American murders another on reservation lands. The Supreme Court also ruled that tribes held exclusive jurisdiction over their own internal affairs, including murder cases. The U.S. Congress responded with the Major Crimes Act, by which Congress has exercised since absolute (plenary) power over tribal jurisdiction by excluding certain crimes from that jurisdiction. This case was the beginning of the plenary power legal doctrine that has been used in Indian case law to limit tribal sovereignty.
- Elk v. Wilkins, 112 U.S. 94 (1884) A Native American cannot make themself a citizen of the United States without the consent and the co-operation of the United States Federal government.
- United States v. Kagama, 118 U.S. 375 (1886) Congress has plenary power over all Native American tribes within its borders.
- Talton v. Mayes, 163 U.S. 376 (1896) Constitutional protections including the provisions of the Bill of Rights do not apply to the actions of American Indian tribal governments.
- Lone Wolf v. Hitchcock, 187 U.S. 553 (1903) Congress may use its plenary power to unilaterally break treaty obligations between the United States and Native American tribes.
- Williams v. Lee, 358 U.S. 217 (1959) State courts do not have jurisdiction on Indian reservations without the authorization of Congress.
- Menominee Tribe v. United States, 391 U.S. 404 (1968) Native American treaty rights are not repealed without a clear and unequivocal statement to that effect from Congress.
- Oneida Indian Nation of New York v. County of Oneida, 414 U.S. 661 (1974) There is federal subject-matter jurisdiction for possessory land claims brought by Indian tribes based upon aboriginal title, the Nonintercourse Act, and Indian treaties.
- Bryan v. Itasca County, 426 U.S. 373 (1976) A state does not have the right to assess a tax on the property of a Native American (Indian) living on tribal land absent a specific Congressional grant of authority to do so.
- Oliphant v. Suquamish Indian Tribe, 435 U.S. 191 (1978) Indian tribal courts do not have inherent criminal jurisdiction to try and to punish non-Indians, and hence may not assume such jurisdiction unless specifically authorized to do so by Congress.
- United States v. Wheeler, 435 U.S. 313 (1978) The Fifth Amendment's Double Jeopardy Clause does not prevent prosecution by both an Indian tribe and the federal government of the United States.
- Santa Clara Pueblo v. Martinez, 436 U.S. 49 (1978) Title I of the Indian Civil Rights Act does not expressly or implicitly create a cause of action for declaratory and injunctive relief in the federal courts.
- Solem v. Bartlett, 465 U.S. 463 (1984) The Supreme Court established three principles to measure Congress's intent to diminish a reservation. It decided that opening up reservation lands for settlement by non-Indians does not constitute the intent to diminish reservation boundaries and therefore reservation boundaries would not be diminished unless specifically determined through legislation.
- County of Oneida v. Oneida Indian Nation of New York State, 470 U.S. 226 (1985) Indian tribes have a federal common law cause of action, not preempted by the Nonintercourse Act, for possessory claims based upon aboriginal title; such action is not barred by limitations, abatement, ratification or nonjusticiability, and due to the Eleventh Amendment, there is no ancillary jurisdiction for counties' cross-claims against a state.
- Lyng v. Northwest Indian Cemetery Protective Association, 485 U.S. 439 (1988) The American Indian Religious Freedom Act of 1978 (AIRFA) does not create a cause of action under which to sue, nor does it contain any judicially enforceable rights.
- United States v. Lara, 541 U.S. 193 (2004) As an Indian tribe and the United States are separate sovereigns, both the United States and a Native American (Indian) tribe can prosecute an Indian for the same acts that constituted crimes in both jurisdictions without invoking double jeopardy if the actions of the accused violated Federal law.
- Herrera v. Wyoming, 587 U.S. 329 (2019) Wyoming's statehood did not void the Crow Tribe's right to hunt on "unoccupied lands of the United States" under an 1868 treaty, and that the Bighorn National Forest did not automatically become "occupied" when the forest was created.
- McGirt v. Oklahoma, 591 U.S. 894 (2020) Oklahoma's land reserved for the Creek Nation since the 19th century remains "Indian country". Native Americans residing in the reservation cannot be criminally prosecuted by the state of Oklahoma.
- Sharp v. Murphy, 591 U.S. 977 (2020) Oklahoma's land reserved for the Creek Nation since the 19th century remains "Indian country". Native Americans residing in the reservation cannot be criminally prosecuted by the state of Oklahoma. Reaffirms McGirt v. Oklahoma
- United States v. Cooley, 593 U.S. 345 (2021) Native American tribal governments and police have the power to search and detain non-Native individuals suspected of violating state or federal laws on tribal lands.
- Oklahoma v. Castro-Huerta, 597 U.S. 629 (2022) The federal government and the state have concurrent jurisdiction to prosecute crimes committed by non-Indians against Indians in Indian country.

== First Amendment rights ==
=== General aspects ===
- National Socialist Party of America v. Village of Skokie, 432 U.S. 43 (1977) If a state seeks to impose an injunction in the face of a substantial claim of First Amendment rights, it must provide strict procedural safeguards, including immediate appellate review. Absent such immediate review, the appellate court must grant a stay of any lower court order restricting the exercise of speech and assembly rights.
- Ward v. Rock Against Racism, 491 U.S. 781 (1989) Content-neutral restrictions on the time, place and manner of speech that are found to serve a compelling state interest must be narrowly tailored to their goal.

=== Freedom of speech and of the press ===
- Patterson v. Colorado, 205 U.S. 454 (1907) Created the bad tendency test, which permitted restriction of freedom of speech by government if it is believed that a form of speech has a sole tendency to incite or cause illegal activity. (Overruled by Schenck v. United States (1919))
- Mutual Film Corp. v. Industrial Commission of Ohio, 236 U.S. 230 (1915) Motion pictures are not entitled to free speech protection because they are a business, not a form of art. (Overruled by Joseph Burstyn, Inc. v. Wilson (1952))
- Schenck v. United States, 249 U.S. 47 (1919) Expressions in which the circumstances are intended to result in crime that poses a clear and present danger of succeeding can be punished without violating the First Amendment. (Overruled by Brandenburg v. Ohio (1969))
- Abrams v. United States, 250 U.S. 616 (1919) Upheld arrests made under the Sedition Act of 1918 as constitutional under the clear and present danger test. (Overruled by Brandenburg v. Ohio (1969))
- Gitlow v. New York, 268 U.S. 652 (1925) The provisions of the First Amendment that protect the freedom of speech and the freedom of the press apply to the governments of the states through the Due Process Clause of the Fourteenth Amendment.
- Stromberg v. California, 283 U.S. 359 (1931) A California law that bans red flags is unconstitutional because it violates the First Amendment's protection of symbolic speech as applied to the states through the Fourteenth Amendment.
- Near v. Minnesota, 283 U.S. 697 (1931) A Minnesota law that imposes prior restraints on the publication of "malicious, scandalous, and defamatory" content violates the First Amendment as applied to the states through the Fourteenth Amendment.
- United States v. One Book Called Ulysses, 5 F.Supp. 182, S.D.N.Y. (1933) Obscene content in a literary work is protected if the purpose of the work as a whole is not to titillate or excite the reader sexually. Upheld by the Second Circuit on appeal.
- New Negro Alliance v. Sanitary Grocery Co., 303 U.S. 552 (1938) Peaceful and orderly dissemination of information by those defined as persons interested in a labor dispute concerning 'terms and conditions of employment' in an industry or a plant or a place of business is lawful.
- Chaplinsky v. New Hampshire, 315 U.S. 568 (1942) Fighting words—words that by their very utterance inflict injury or tend to incite an immediate breach of the peace—are not protected by the First Amendment.
- Joseph Burstyn, Inc. v. Wilson, 343 U.S. 495 (1952) Motion pictures, as a form of artistic expression, are protected by the First Amendment.
- Roth v. United States, 354 U.S. 476 (1957) Obscene material is not protected by the First Amendment. (Superseded by Miller v. California (1973))
- One, Inc. v. Olesen, 355 U.S. 371 (1958) Pro-homosexual writing is not per se obscene. It was the first U.S. Supreme Court ruling to address free speech rights with respect to homosexuality.
- Manual Enterprises, Inc. v. Day, 370 U.S. 348 (1962) Images of naked men are not, per se, obscene, extending Olesen in a way that spurred an increase in same-sex erotica that helped spur the rise of the LGBTQ rights movement later in the decade.
- New York Times Co. v. Sullivan, 376 U.S. 254 (1964) Public officials, to prove they were libelled, must show not only that a statement is false, but also that it was published with malicious intent (knowing the statement was false, or recklessly disregarding possible falseness).
- Dombrowski v. Pfister, 380 U.S. 479 (1965) A court may enjoin enforcement of a statute that is so overbroad in its prohibition of unprotected speech that it substantially prohibits protected speech—especially if the statute is being enforced in bad faith.
- Curtis Publishing Co. v. Butts, 388 U.S. 130 (1967) News organizations may be liable when printing allegations about public figures if the information they disseminate is recklessly gathered and unchecked.
- United States v. O'Brien, 391 U.S. 367 (1968) A criminal prohibition against draft-card burning does not violate the First Amendment because its effect on speech is only incidental, and it is justified by the significant governmental interest in maintaining an efficient and effective military draft system.
- Pickering v. Board of Education, 391 U.S. 563 (1968) Public employees do not surrender their First Amendment rights to speak on matters of public concern, even critically of their employers, when they take their jobs.
- Tinker v. Des Moines Independent Community School District, 393 U.S. 503 (1969) Public school students have free speech rights under the First Amendment. Therefore, wearing armbands as a form of protest on public school grounds qualifies as protected symbolic speech.
- Brandenburg v. Ohio, 395 U.S. 444 (1969) The mere advocacy of the use of force or of violation of the law is protected by the First Amendment. Only inciting others to take direct and immediate unlawful action is without constitutional protection.
- Cohen v. California, 403 U.S. 15 (1971) The First Amendment prohibits the states from making the public display of a single four-letter expletive a criminal offense without a more specific and compelling reason than a general tendency to disturb the peace.
- New York Times Co. v. United States, 403 U.S. 713 (1971) The federal government's desire to keep the Pentagon Papers classified is not strong enough to justify violating the First Amendment by imposing prior restraints on the material.
- Branzburg v. Hayes, 408 U.S. 665 (1972) The First Amendment's protection of press freedom does not give the reporters' privilege in court.
- Miller v. California, 413 U.S. 15 (1973) To be obscene, a work must fail the Miller test, which determines if it has any "serious literary, artistic, political, or scientific value."
- Gertz v. Robert Welch, Inc., 418 U.S. 323 (1974) The First Amendment permits the states to formulate their own standards of liability for defamation against private individuals as long as liability is not imposed without fault. If the state standard is lower than actual malice, then only actual damages may be awarded.
- Buckley v. Valeo, 424 U.S. 1 (1976) Spending money to influence elections is a form of constitutionally protected free speech; therefore, federal limits on campaign contributions are constitutional in only a limited number of circumstances.
- Virginia State Pharmacy Board v. Virginia Citizens Consumer Council, 425 U.S. 748 (1976) Commercial speech enjoys limited First Amendment protection.
- Federal Communications Commission v. Pacifica Foundation, 438 U.S. 726 (1978) Broadcasting has less First Amendment protection than other forms of communication because of its pervasive nature. The Federal Communications Commission has broad authority to determine what constitutes indecency in different contexts.
- Central Hudson Gas & Electric Corp. v. Public Service Commission, 447 U.S. 557 (1980) The United States Supreme Court laid out a four-part test for determining when restrictions on commercial speech violated the First Amendment of the United States Constitution.
- NAACP v. Claiborne Hardware Co., 458 U.S. 886 (1982) Nonviolent boycotts and related activities to bring about political, social, and economic change are political speech which are entitled to the protection of the First Amendment.
- New York v. Ferber, 458 U.S. 747 (1982) Laws that prohibit the sale, distribution, and advertisement of child pornography are constitutional even if the content does not meet the conditions necessary for it to be labeled obscene.
- Connick v. Myers, 461 U.S. 138 (1983) Public employers may take adverse action against employees for otherwise protected speech on matters of public concern, including speech critical of them, if they have a reasonable belief that the speech is disruptive to their operations.
- Posadas de Puerto Rico Associates v. Tourism Co. of Puerto Rico, 478 U.S. 328 (1986) Illustrated the elasticity of the Central Hudson standards for regulating commercial speech.
- Bethel School District v. Fraser, 478 U.S. 675 (1986) The First Amendment permits a public school to punish a student for giving a lewd and indecent speech at a school assembly even if the speech is not obscene.
- Hazelwood v. Kuhlmeier, 484 U.S. 260 (1988) Public school curricular student newspapers that have not been established as forums for student expression are subject to a lower level of First Amendment protection than independent student expression or newspapers established by policy or practice as forums for student expression.
- Hustler Magazine v. Falwell, 485 U.S. 46 (1988) Parodies of public figures, including those intended to cause emotional distress, are protected by the First Amendment.
- Texas v. Johnson, 491 U.S. 397 (1989) A Texas law that criminalizes the desecration of the American flag is unconstitutional because it violates the First Amendment's protection of symbolic speech. This decision invalidates laws prohibiting flag desecration in 48 of the 50 states. Alaska and Wyoming had no such laws.
- Barnes v. Glen Theatre, Inc., 501 U.S. 560 (1991) While nude dancing is a form of expressive conduct, public indecency laws regulating or prohibiting nude dancing are constitutional because they further substantial governmental interests in maintaining order and protecting morality.
- R.A.V. v. City of St. Paul, 505 U.S. 377 (1992) Saint Paul's Bias-Motivated Crime Ordinance is a content-based restriction of speech and is therefore unconstitutional.
- Wisconsin v. Mitchell, 508 U.S. 476 (1993) Enhanced penalties for hate crimes are constitutional.
- Reno v. American Civil Liberties Union, 521 U.S. 844 (1997) The Communications Decency Act, which regulates certain content on the Internet, is so overbroad that it is an unconstitutional restraint on the First Amendment.
- Kaelin v. Globe Communications, 162 F.3d 1036 (9th Cir. 1998) A headline on the cover of a magazine which "falsely insinuated" a criminal act may be grounds for a libel action even if the related article inside the magazine is not defamatory.
- Virginia v. Black, 538 U.S. 343 (2003) Any state statute which bans cross burning on the basis that it constitutes prima facie evidence of intent to intimidate is a violation of the First Amendment to the Constitution. However, states may still ban cross burning with intent to intimidate due to the act's uniquely hateful history.
- McConnell v. Federal Election Commission, 540 U.S. 93 (2003) Upheld the constitutionality of most of the Bipartisan Campaign Reform Act. (Overruled by Citizens United v. Federal Election Commission (2010))
- Garcetti v. Ceballos, 547 U.S. 410 (2006) When public employees speak in their capacity as citizens on matters of public concern, even to criticize their employers, their speech is protected.
- Davis v. Federal Election Commission, 554 U.S. 724 (2008) Limitations on financial contributions to political campaigns of candidates whose opponents are self-funding their own campaigns may not be raised beyond whatever their opponents can legally contribute. Section 319 of the Bipartisan Campaign Reform Act of 2002 is unconstitutional because it violates the Free Speech Clause of the First Amendment.
- Citizens United v. Federal Election Commission, 558 U.S. 310 (2010) Limits on corporate and union political expenditures during election cycles violate the Free Speech Clause of the First Amendment. Corporations and labor unions can spend unlimited sums in support of or in opposition to candidates as long as the spending is independent of the candidates.
- Snyder v. Phelps, 562 U.S. 443 (2011) The Westboro Baptist Church's picketing of funerals cannot be liable for a tort of emotional distress.
- Brown v. Entertainment Merchants Association, 564 U.S. 786 (2011) Laws restricting the sale of violent video games to children without parental supervision violate the First Amendment.
- McCutcheon v. Federal Election Commission, 572 U.S. 185 (2014) Limits on the total amounts of money that individuals can donate to political campaigns during two-year election cycles violate the First Amendment.
- Minnesota Voters Alliance v. Mansky, 585 U.S. 1 (2018) A law banning politically motivated apparel and accessories inside polling places is overbroad and violates the First Amendment.
- Janus v. AFSCME, No. 16-1466, 585 U.S. ___ (2018) No public sector employee, having refused membership in a trade union, may be compelled to pay union dues to said union because of the benefits he may receive from their collective bargaining. "Fair share" agreements, when applied to public sector workers, violate the First Amendment protections of free association and freedom of speech.
- Federal Election Commission v. Ted Cruz for Senate, 596 U.S. 289 (2022) Limits on the amount a campaign for public office can pay back in loans to the candidate more than 20 days after an election violates the First Amendment as it places a limit on the candidate's free speech. Overturns Section 304 of the Bipartisan Campaign Reform Act of 2002.
- 303 Creative LLC v. Elenis, 600 U.S. 570 (2023) Anti-discrimination laws cannot be used to compel expressive speech that goes against a person's values.

=== Freedom of religion ===
- Reynolds v. United States, 98 U.S. 145 (1879) Religious belief or duty cannot be used as a defense against a criminal indictment.
- Davis v. Beason, 133 U.S. 333 (1890) The Edmunds Anti-Polygamy Act of 1882 does not violate the Free Exercise Clause of the First Amendment even though polygamy is part of several religious beliefs.
- Cantwell v. Connecticut, 310 U.S. 296 (1940) The states cannot interfere with the free exercise of religion.
- Minersville School District v. Gobitis, 310 U.S. 586 (1940) The First Amendment does not require public schools to excuse students from saluting the American flag and reciting the Pledge of Allegiance on religious grounds. (Overruled by West Virginia State Board of Education v. Barnette (1943))
- Murdock v. Pennsylvania, 319 U.S. 105 (1943) A Pennsylvania ordinance that imposes a license tax on those selling religious merchandise violates the Free Exercise Clause.
- West Virginia State Board of Education v. Barnette, 319 U.S. 624 (1943) Public schools cannot override the religious beliefs of their students by forcing them to salute the American flag and recite the Pledge of Allegiance.
- Marsh v. Alabama, 326 U.S. 501 (1946) Governments cannot require permits to proselytize, or bar it outright, in public spaces even where those are privately owned.
- Everson v. Board of Education, 330 U.S. 1 (1947) A state law that reimburses the costs of transportation to and from parochial schools does not violate the Establishment Clause of the First Amendment. The Establishment Clause is incorporated against the states, and the Constitution requires a sharp separation between government and religion.
- McCollum v. Board of Education, 333 U.S. 203 (1948) The use of public school facilities by religious organizations to give religious instruction to school children violates the Establishment Clause.
- Kunz v. New York, 340 U.S. 290 (1951) A requirement mandating a permit to speak on religious issues in public is unconstitutional.
- Braunfeld v. Brown, 366 U.S. 599 (1961) A Pennsylvania blue law forbidding the sale of various retail products on Sunday was not an unconstitutional interference with religion as described in the First Amendment to the United States Constitution.
- Engel v. Vitale, 370 U.S. 421 (1962) Government-directed prayer in public schools, even if it is denominationally neutral and non-mandatory, violates the Establishment Clause.
- Abington School District v. Schempp, 374 U.S. 203 (1963) School-sponsored reading of the Bible and recitation of the Lord's Prayer in public schools is unconstitutional under the Establishment Clause.
- Sherbert v. Verner, 374 U.S. 398 (1963) Created the Sherbert test, requiring the government to demonstrate both a compelling interest and that the law in question was narrowly tailored when restricting free exercise of religion. This test was codified on the federal level in the Religious Freedom Restoration Act and the Religious Land Use and Institutionalized Persons Act. (Partially overruled by Employment Division v. Smith (1990))
- Flast v. Cohen, 392 U.S. 83 (1968) Taxpayers have standing to sue to prevent the disbursement of federal funds in contravention of the specific constitutional prohibition against government support of religion.
- Epperson v. Arkansas, 393 U.S. 97 (1968) States may not require curricula to align with the views of any particular religion.
- Lemon v. Kurtzman, 403 U.S. 602 (1971) For a law to be considered constitutional under the Establishment Clause, the law must have a legitimate secular purpose, must not have the primary effect of either advancing or inhibiting religion, and must not result in an excessive entanglement of government and religion (Overruled by Groff v. DeJoy, 600 U.S. 447 (2023))
- Wisconsin v. Yoder, 406 U.S. 205 (1972) Parents may remove their children from public schools for religious reasons.
- Marsh v. Chambers, 463 U.S. 783 (1983) A state legislature's practice of opening its sessions with a prayer offered by a state-supported chaplain does not violate the Establishment Clause.
- Edwards v. Aguillard, 482 U.S. 578 (1987) Teaching creationism in public schools is unconstitutional.
- Corporation of Presiding Bishop v. Amos, 483 U.S. 327 (1987) Title VII of the Civil Rights Act, exempting religious organizations from the prohibition on religious discrimination, even in secular activities, did not violate the First Amendment.
- Employment Division v. Smith, 494 U.S. 872 (1990) Neutral laws of general applicability do not violate the Free Exercise Clause.
- Lee v. Weisman, 505 U.S. 577 (1992) Including a clergy-led prayer within the events of a public school graduation ceremony violates the Establishment Clause.
- Church of the Lukumi Babalu Aye v. City of Hialeah, 508 U.S. 520 (1993) The government must show a compelling interest to pass a law that targets a religion's ritual (as opposed to a law that happens to burden the ritual but is not directed at it). Failing to show such an interest, the prohibition of animal sacrifice is a violation of the Free Exercise Clause.
- Rosenberger v. University of Virginia, 515 U.S. 819 (1995) A university cannot use student dues to fund secular groups while excluding religious groups.
- Agostini v. Felton, 521 U.S. 203 (1997) Allowing public school teachers to teach at parochial schools does not violate the Establishment Clause as long as the material that is taught is secular and neutral in nature and no "excessive entanglement" between government and religion is apparent.
- Santa Fe Independent School District v. Doe, 530 U.S. 290 (2000) Prayer in public schools that is initiated and led by students violates the Establishment Clause.
- Zelman v. Simmons-Harris, 536 U.S. 639 (2002) A government program that provides tuition vouchers for students to attend a private or religious school of their parents' choosing is constitutional because the vouchers are neutral toward religion and, therefore, do not violate the Establishment Clause. The Supreme Court developed the private choice test which states that a voucher program in order to be constitutional must meet all five criteria of the test.
- Hosanna-Tabor Evangelical Lutheran Church and School v. Equal Employment Opportunity Commission, 565 U.S. 171 (2012) Ministers cannot sue their churches by claiming termination in violation of employment non-discrimination laws. The Establishment Clause forbids the appointing of ministers by the government; therefore, it cannot interfere with the freedom of religious groups to select their own ministers under the Free Exercise Clause.
- Town of Greece v. Galloway, 572 U.S. 565 (2014) A town council's practice of opening its sessions with a sectarian prayer does not violate the Establishment Clause.
- Burwell v. Hobby Lobby Stores, Inc., 573 U.S. 682 (2014) Closely held, for-profit corporations have free exercise rights under the Religious Freedom Restoration Act of 1993. As applied to such corporations, the requirement of the Patient Protection and Affordable Care Act that employers provide their female employees with no-cost access to contraception violates the Religious Freedom Restoration Act.
- American Legion v. American Humanist Association, 588 U.S. 29 (2019) A war memorial Latin cross displayed on public land does not violate the Establishment Clause, because longstanding monuments should be afforded a presumption of constitutionality.
- Espinoza v. Montana Department of Revenue, 591 U.S. 464 (2020) A state's "no aid" constitutional provision prohibiting state aid to religious schools violates the Free Exercise clause by explicitly discriminating against institutions on the basis of religion.
- Carson v. Makin, 596 U.S. 767 (2022) Excluding "sectarian" schools from a tuition assistance program violates the Free Exercise Clause of the First Amendment.
- Kennedy v. Bremerton School District, 597 U.S. 507 (2022) The non renewal of a public high school football coach contract due to confliction of separation of church and state. The Court announced that the Lemon test from the landmark case of Lemon v. Kurtzman (1971) had been abandoned by the Court in later cases. Instead, the Court announced, original meaning and history govern analysis of the Establishment Clause.

=== Freedom of association ===
- De Jonge v. Oregon, 299 U.S. 353 (1937) The freedom of association is incorporated against the states by the Due Process Clause of the Fourteenth Amendment.
- National Association for the Advancement of Colored People v. Alabama, 357 U.S. 449 (1958) The freedom to associate with organizations dedicated to the "advancement of beliefs and ideas" is an inseparable part of the Due Process Clause of the Fourteenth Amendment.
- Hurley v. Irish-American Gay, Lesbian, and Bisexual Group of Boston, 515 U.S. 557 (1995) Private citizens organizing a public demonstration have the right to exclude groups whose message they disagree with from participating.
- Boy Scouts of America v. Dale, 530 U.S. 640 (2000) Private organizations are allowed to choose their own membership and expel members based on their sexual orientation even if such discrimination would otherwise be prohibited by anti-discrimination legislation designed to protect minorities in public accommodations.

=== Freedom of petition ===
- Edwards v. South Carolina, 372 U.S. 229 (1963) The Free Petition Clause extends to the states through the Due Process Clause of the Fourteenth Amendment.
- California Motor Transport Co. v. Trucking Unlimited, 404 U.S. 508 (1972) The Free Petition Clause encompasses petitions to all three branches of the federal government—the Congress, the executive including administrative agencies, and the judiciary.

== Second Amendment rights ==
- United States v. Cruikshank, 92 U.S. 542 (1876) The Second Amendment has no purpose other than to restrict the powers of the federal government. The right to keep and bear arms for a lawful purpose is not a right granted by the Constitution or dependent upon the Constitution for its existence. (Overruled by District of Columbia v. Heller (2008) and McDonald v. City of Chicago (2010))
- Presser v. Illinois, 116 U.S. 252 (1886) An Illinois law that prohibits common citizens from forming personal military organizations, performing drills, and parading is constitutional because such a law does not limit the personal right to keep and bear arms.
- United States v. Miller, 307 U.S. 174 (1939) The federal government and the states can limit access to all weapons that do not have "some reasonable relationship to the preservation or efficiency of a well regulated militia."
- District of Columbia v. Heller, 554 U.S. 570 (2008) The Second Amendment protects an individual right to possess a firearm unconnected with service in a militia and to use it for traditionally lawful purposes such as self-defense within the home.
- McDonald v. City of Chicago, 561 U.S. 742 (2010) The individual right to keep and bear arms for self-defense is incorporated against the states through the Fourteenth Amendment's Due Process Clause or Privileges or Immunities Clause.
- Caetano v. Massachusetts, 577 U.S. 411 (2016) The Second Amendment extends to all bearable arms, including those that were not in existence at the time of the founding.
- New York State Rifle & Pistol Association, Inc. v. Bruen, 597 U.S. 1 (2022) The Second Amendment protects an individual's right to carry a handgun for self-defense in public, outside the home; firearms regulations challenged on constitutional grounds must be evaluated against the "history and tradition" of such laws in the U.S.
- United States v. Rahimi, No. 22-915, 602 U.S. ___ (2024) Laws preventing gun possession by those with a civil domestic violence restraining order are constitutional. Refined the Bruen test, stating that in comparing modern gun control laws to historic tradition, courts should use similar analogues and general principles rather than strict matches.

== Third Amendment rights ==
- Engblom v. Carey, 677 F.2d 957 (2d Cir. 1982) Members of the National Guard qualify as "soldiers" under the Third Amendment. The Third Amendment is incorporated against the states through the Due Process Clause of the Fourteenth Amendment. And the protection of the Third Amendment applies to anyone who, within their residence, has a legal expectation of privacy and a legal right to exclude others from entry into the premises. This case is notable for being the only case based on Third Amendment claims that has been decided by a federal appeals court.

== Fourteenth Amendment rights ==
- Slaughter-House Cases, 83 U.S. 36 (1873) The Privileges or Immunities Clause of the Fourteenth Amendment applies to the benefits of federal United States citizenship but not to the benefits of state citizenship.
- Allgeyer v. Louisiana, 165 U.S. 578 (1897) The liberty that is protected by the Due Process Clause of the Fourteenth Amendment includes economic liberty.
- Meyer v. Nebraska, 262 U.S. 390 (1923) A 1919 Nebraska law prohibiting the teaching of modern foreign languages to grade-school children violated the Due Process Clause.
- Pierce v. Society of Sisters, 268 U.S. 510 (1925) Parents have the right to choose the school of their choice for their children's education under the Due Process Clause.
- Skinner v. Oklahoma, 316 U.S. 535 (1942) State eugenics laws mandating sterilization of criminals convicted of some crimes but not others are unconstitutional as it violates a person's rights given under the Equal Protection Clause and Due Process Clause of the 14th Amendment.
- International Shoe Co. v. Washington, 326 U.S. 310 (1945) Minimum contacts with the forum state can enable a court in that state to exert personal jurisdiction over a party consistent with the Due Process Clause.
- Goldberg v. Kelly, 397 U.S. 254 (1970) The termination of welfare benefits must be preceded by a full evidentiary hearing under the Due Process Clause.
- San Antonio Independent School District v. Rodriguez, 411 U.S. 1 (1973) The use of property taxes to finance public education does not violate the Equal Protection Clause.
- Richardson v. Ramirez, 418 U.S. 24 (1974) Disenfranchising convicted felons beyond their sentence and parole does not violate the Equal Protection Clause.
- Mathews v. Eldridge, 424 U.S. 319 (1976) When procedural due process applies, courts must consider the government's interests, the individual's interests, and the likelihood of making an inaccurate decision using the existing procedures as well as the probable value of additional procedural safeguards.
- Cleveland Board of Education v. Loudermill, 470 U.S. 532 (1985) Public employees are entitled to some form of hearing prior to termination for cause, overruling Arnett v. Kennedy.
- Trump v. Anderson, 601 U.S. 100 (2024) Only Congress, not the states, can determine eligibility for federal office under Section 3 of the Fourteenth Amendment.

== Separation of powers ==
- Marbury v. Madison, 5 U.S. 137 (1803) Section 13 of the Judiciary Act of 1789 is unconstitutional because it attempts to expand the original jurisdiction of the Supreme Court beyond that permitted by the Constitution. Congress cannot pass laws that contradict the Constitution. This case featured the first example of judicial nullification of a federal law and it was the point at which the Supreme Court adopted a monitoring role over government actions.
- Little v. Barreme, 6 U.S. 170 (1804) The president does not have "inherent authority" or "inherent powers" that allow him to ignore a law passed by the US Congress. Presidential orders which contradict acts of Congress are illegal, and military officers are responsible for the execution of illegal commands, despite the nature of military chain of command.
- United States v. Klein, 80 U.S. 128 (1871) The principle of separation of powers prohibits Congress from prescribing a rule of decision for the federal courts to follow in particular pending cases, because the legislative branch cannot impair the exclusive powers of another branch.
- Chae Chan Ping v. United States, 130 U.S. 581 (1889) Congress has the power to enact immigration and nationality laws, even those that abrogate prior treaties, immigration and nationality laws are an exclusively federal matter, and immigration and nationality laws are owed broad judicial deference, subject only to minimal judicial review.
- Myers v. United States, 272 U.S. 52 (1926) The president has the exclusive power to remove executive branch officials, and does not need the approval of the Senate or any other legislative body.
- J. W. Hampton, Jr. & Co. v. United States, 276 U.S. 394 (1928) Congressional delegation of legislative authority is an implied power of Congress that is constitutional so long as Congress provides an "intelligible principle" to guide the executive branch.
- Springer v. Government of the Philippine Islands, 277 U.S. 189 (1928) American Constitutions, both state and federal, divides the government into three separate departments—the legislative, executive, and judicial. This separation and the consequent exclusive character of the powers conferred upon each of the three departments is basic and vital—not merely a matter of governmental mechanism. It may be stated then, as a general rule inherent in the American constitutional system, that, unless otherwise expressly provided or incidental to the powers conferred, the legislature cannot exercise either executive or judicial power; the executive cannot exercise either legislative or judicial power; the judiciary cannot exercise either executive or legislative power.
- Humphrey's Executor v. United States, 295 U.S. 602 (1935) The president may not remove an appointee to an independent regulatory agency except for reasons that Congress has provided by law. (Overruled by Trump v. Slaughter (2026))
- Nixon v. General Services Administration, 433 U.S. 425 (1977) Congress has the power to pass a law that directs the seizure and disposition of the papers and tapes of a former president that are within the control of the executive branch.
- Immigration and Naturalization Service v. Chadha, 462 U.S. 919 (1983) Congress may not promulgate a statute granting to itself a legislative veto over actions of the executive branch because such a veto is inconsistent with the bicameralism principle and Presentment Clause of the Constitution.
- Bowsher v. Synar, 478 U.S. 714 (1986) Congress cannot reserve removal power over executive officers to itself, except for impeachment.
- Morrison v. Olson, 487 U.S. 654 (1988) The Ethics in Government Act of 1978 is constitutional because it does not increase the power of the judiciary or legislative branches at the expense of the executive branch. Its restriction on the power of the United States Attorney General to remove an inferior officer only for good cause does not violate the Appointments Clause.
- Plaut v. Spendthrift Farm, Inc., 514 U.S. 211 (1995) Congress is unable to make any law or provision therein to reopen cases which have been previously adjudicated by or within federal courts. Congress violates the separation of powers principle when it orders federal courts to reopen their final judgments.
- Clinton v. City of New York, 524 U.S. 417 (1998) The Line Item Veto Act is unconstitutional because it allows the president to amend or repeal parts of statutes without the pre-approval of Congress. According to the Presentment Clause of the Constitution, Congress must initiate all changes to existing laws.
- National Labor Relations Board v. Noel Canning, 573 U.S. 513 (2014) For purposes of the Recess Appointment Clause, the Senate is in session when it says that it is if, under its own rules, it retains the capacity to transact business. D.C. Circuit affirmed.
- Bank Markazi v. Peterson, 578 U.S. 212 (2016) A law which only applied to a specific case, identified by docket number, and eliminated all of the defenses that one party had raised does not violate the separation of powers in the United States Constitution between the legislative (Congress) and judicial branches of government.
- Trump v. Slaughter, 609 U.S. ___ (2026) The Constitution's separation of powers prohibits Congress from requiring the President to have cause before removing a subordinate.

== Administrative law ==
- United States ex rel. Accardi v. Shaughnessy, 347 U.S. 260 (1954) Administrative agencies are obliged to follow their own regulations, policies and procedures. Under the Accardi Doctrine, federal agencies which do not follow their own regulations or procedures run the risk of having their actions invalidated if challenged in court.
- Citizens to Preserve Overton Park v. Volpe, 401 U.S. 402 (1972) The case established the basic legal framework for judicial review of the actions of administrative agencies.
- Chevron U.S.A., Inc. v. Natural Resources Defense Council, Inc., 467 U.S. 837 (1984) An interpretation by a government agency of its own mandate from Congress is entitled to judicial deference if the authority is ambiguous and the agency's interpretation is permissible under the statute, regardless as to whether it is the best possible interpretation or an interpretation the Court would have made. (Overruled by Loper Bright Enterprises v. Raimondo (2024))
- Auer v. Robbins, 519 U.S. 452 (1997) Agencies have the highest level of deference in interpreting their own regulations. However, deference is warranted only if the language of the regulation is ambiguous unless it is plainly erroneous or inconsistent with the regulation. The case expands Chevron deference by giving the agency the highest deference.
- Massachusetts v. Environmental Protection Agency, 549 U.S. 497 (2007) Greenhouse gases are air pollutants, and the Environmental Protection Agency may regulate their emission under the Clean Air Act.
- Michigan v. Environmental Protection Agency, 576 U.S. 743 (2015) The Environmental Protection Agency must consider costs when it regulates power plants under the Clean Air Act.
- West Virginia v. Environmental Protection Agency, 596 U.S. 697 (2022) The Environmental Protection Agency only has limited authority to set caps on carbon emissions. Under the major questions doctrine, Congress is presumed not to delegate questions of vast economic and political significance to an agency except with clear statutory authorization.
- Loper Bright Enterprises v. Raimondo, No. 22-451, 603 U.S. ___ (2024) The Administrative Procedure Act requires courts to exercise their independent judgment in deciding whether an agency has acted within its statutory authority, and courts may not defer to an agency interpretation of the law simply because a statute is ambiguous; Chevron is overruled.

== Executive power ==
=== Domestic ===
- Youngstown Sheet & Tube Co. v. Sawyer, 343 U.S. 579 (1952) The president cannot seize private property in the absence of either specifically enumerated authority under the Constitution or statutory authority given to them by Congress. Commander-in-chief powers do not extend to labor disputes.
- United States v. Nixon, 418 U.S. 683 (1974) The doctrine of executive privilege is legitimate; however, the president cannot invoke it in criminal cases to withhold evidence.
- Halkin v. Helms, 598 F.2d 1 (D.C. Cir. 1978) The NSA is not required to disclose evidence which may threaten the diplomatic or military interests of the nation in court.
- Harlow v. Fitzgerald, 457 U.S. 800 (1982) Presidential aides were not entitled to absolute immunity, but instead deserved qualified immunity.
- Nixon v. Fitzgerald, 457 U.S. 731 (1982) The president is entitled to absolute immunity from legal liability for civil damages based on his official acts. The president is not immune from criminal charges stemming from his official or unofficial acts while he is in office.
- Clinton v. Jones, 520 U.S. 681 (1997) The president has no immunity that could require civil law litigation against them involving a dispute unrelated to the office of President to be stayed until the end of their term. Such a delay would deprive the parties to the suit of the right to a speedy trial that is guaranteed by the Sixth Amendment.
- Trump v. Mazars USA, LLP, 591 U.S. 848 (2020) The court laid out a four-factor balancing test that lower courts must weigh before determining if congressional subpoenas involving the president and his papers are valid.
- Trump v. Vance, 591 U.S. 786 (2020) Article II and the supremacy clause of the U.S. Constitution do not categorically preclude, or require a heightened standard for, the issuance of a state criminal subpoena to a sitting president.
- Trump v. United States, No. 23-939, 603 U.S. ___ (2024) The president has absolute immunity for official actions taken under his core constitutional powers, presumptive immunity for other official actions, and no immunity for unofficial actions.

=== Foreign ===
- The Paquete Habana, 175 U.S. 677 (1900) The president may not issue exemptions to customary international law at discretion. Federal courts may look to customary international law because it is an integrated part of American law.
- United States v. Curtiss-Wright Export Corp., 299 U.S. 304 (1936) The Constitution implies that the ability to conduct foreign policy is vested entirely in the president. The president has plenary power in the foreign affairs field that does not depend on congressional delegation.
- Medellín v. Texas, 552 U.S. 491 (2008) International treaties are not binding domestic law unless Congress enacts statutes implementing them or unless the treaties are self-executing. Also, decisions of the International Court of Justice are not binding domestic law, and without authority from Congress or the Constitution, the president lacks the power to enforce international treaties or decisions of the International Court of Justice.
- Zivotofsky v. Kerry, 576 U.S. 1 (2015) The president, as head of the executive branch, has exclusive power to recognize (or not recognize) foreign nations.
- Trump v. Hawaii, 585 U.S. 667 (2018) Presidential Proclamation 9645 did not violate the INA or the Establishment Clause by suspending the entry of aliens from several nations. Substantial deference must be accorded to the Executive in the conduct of foreign affairs and the exclusion of aliens.
- Learning Resources, Inc. v. Trump, 607 U.S. ___ (2026) The president does not have the power to impose tariffs using IEEPA except where Congress has specifically delegated the power to do so. This ruling favors the major questions doctrine, without specifically invoking it.

== Other areas ==
=== Voting and redistricting ===
- Baker v. Carr, 369 U.S. 186 (1962) The redistricting of state legislative districts is not a political question, so it is justiciable by the federal courts.
- Gray v. Sanders, 372 U.S. 368 (1963) Formulated the "one person, one vote" standard. State elections must adhere to the "one person, one vote" principle.
- Wesberry v. Sanders, 376 U.S. 1 (1964) The Constitution requires that the members of the House of Representatives be selected from districts composed, as nearly as is practicable, of equal population.
- Reynolds v. Sims, 377 U.S. 533 (1964) The populations of state legislative districts must be as equal as mathematically possible so as to ensure equal protection.
- Harper v. Virginia State Board of Elections, 383 U.S. 663 (1966) A state's conditioning of the right to vote on the payment of a fee or tax violates the Equal Protection Clause of the Fourteenth Amendment.
- Avery v. Midland County, 390 U.S. 474 (1969) Local government districts have to be roughly equal in population.
- Shaw v. Reno, 509 U.S. 630 (1993) Redistricting based on race must be held to a standard of strict scrutiny under the equal protection clause while bodies doing redistricting must be conscious of race to the extent that they must ensure compliance with the Voting Rights Act of 1965.
- Bush v. Gore, 531 U.S. 98 (2000) The recount of ballots in Florida during the 2000 presidential election violated the Equal Protection Clause because different standards of counting were used in the counties that were subjected to the recount. This decision effectively resolved the election in favor of the Republican nominee, George W. Bush.
- Rucho v. Common Cause, 588 U.S. 684 (2019) Partisan gerrymandering claims present political questions beyond the reach of the federal courts.
- Chiafalo v. Washington, 591 U.S. 578 (2020) States have the ability to require Presidential electors to vote for the candidate who wins the state's popular vote and to remove and/or punish electors who violate pledges to that effect.
- Brnovich v. Democratic National Committee, 594 U.S. 647 (2021) Arizona's voting restrictions regarding provisional ballot counting do not violate Section 2 of the Voting Rights Act of 1965.
- Louisiana v. Callais, 608 U.S. ___ (2026) Plaintiffs challenging state district maps under Section 2 of the Voting Rights Act of 1965 must demonstrate that a state intentionally redistricted to diminish representation for minority voters.

=== Takings Clause ===
- Pennsylvania Coal Co. v. Mahon, 260 U.S. 393 (1922) Whether a regulatory act constitutes a taking requiring compensation depends on the extent of diminution in the value of the property.
- United States v. Causby, 328 U.S. 256 (1946) The ownership of property does not extend infinitely upward, and navigable airspace is public domain.
- Berman v. Parker, 348 U.S. 26 (1954) Under the Takings Clause of the Fifth Amendment, private property can be taken for a public purpose as long as just compensation is paid from whom the property was taken.
- Penn Central Transportation Co. v. New York City, 438 U.S. 104 (1978) Whether a regulatory action that diminishes the value of a claimant's property constitutes a "taking" of that property within the meaning of the Fifth Amendment depends on several factors, including the economic impact of the regulation on the claimant, particularly the extent to which the regulation has interfered with distinct investment-backed expectations, as well as the character of the governmental action.
- Lucas v. South Carolina Coastal Council, 503 U.S. 1003 (1992) Established the "total takings" test, i.e. has the owner been deprived of all possible beneficial use of the property, in determining whether a regulation limiting use of the property constitutes a regulatory taking.
- Dolan v. City of Tigard, 512 U.S. 374 (1994) A government agency may not take property in exchange for benefits that are unrelated to the agency's interest in the property.
- Lingle v. Chevron U.S.A. Inc., 544 U.S. 528 (2005) Contrary to the holding of Agins v. City of Tiburon, which held that a government regulation of private property effects a taking if such regulation does not substantially advance legitimate state interests, the test of whether a governmental regulation substantially advances a legitimate state interest is irrelevant to determining whether the regulation effects an uncompensated taking of private property in violation of the Fifth Amendment.
- Kelo v. City of New London, 545 U.S. 469 (2005) Local governments may seize property for economic development purposes. Noted for converting the "public use" requirement of the Takings Clause to "public purpose."

=== Businesses/Corporations/Contracts ===
- Laidlaw v. Organ, 15 U.S. 178 (1817) Established the contract law principle caveat emptor in the United States.
- Dartmouth College v. Woodward, 17 U.S. 518 (1819) The Contract Clause of the Constitution applies to both public and private corporations.
- Lochner v. New York, 198 U.S. 45 (1905) The freedom of contract is implicit in the Due Process Clause of the Fourteenth Amendment.
- Hale v. Henkel, 201 U.S. 43 (1906) Corporate employees cannot assert the privilege against self-incrimination on behalf of their employer.
- Standard Oil Co. of New Jersey v. United States, 221 U.S. 1 (1911) The monopolization of the American petroleum industry by Standard Oil violated the Sherman Antitrust Act, and Standard Oil would be forced to break apart into smaller companies. This case established that antitrust law only bans "unreasonable" trade restraints.
- Federal Baseball Club of Baltimore v. National League of Professional Baseball Clubs, 259 U.S. 200 (1922) Professional baseball does not constitute interstate commerce since road games are not very profitable, and therefore it is exempt from the Sherman Act's antitrust provisions. This was one of the last antitrust exemptions granted by the Court under the less expansive reading of the Interstate Commerce Clause that saw it as chiefly concerned with the manufacture and shipping of goods across state lines, and the only one that remains in force; Congress has limited some aspects of it but has not repealed it. No other professional sport has been held exempt from antitrust law.
- West Coast Hotel Co. v. Parrish, 300 U.S. 379 (1937) Minimum wage legislation is a valid regulation of freedom of contract; seen as ending the Lochner era.
- Gregory v. Helvering, 293 U.S. 465 (1935) Taxpayers have the right to decrease the amount of their taxes or to avoid them altogether by means which the law permits. However, a business reorganization must have economic substance in order to affect tax liability.
- United States v. South-Eastern Underwriters Association, 322 U.S. 533 (1944) Businesses whose interstate aspect consists of negotiating and executing contracts with clients, such as insurers, are interstate commerce subject to antitrust law.
- Escola v. Coca-Cola Bottling Co., 24 Cal.2d 453, 150 P.2d 436 (1944) Important case in the development of the common law of product liability in the United States based on the concurring opinion of California Supreme Court justice Roger Traynor who stated "that a manufacturer incurs an absolute liability when an article that he has placed on the market, knowing that it is to be used without inspection, proves to have a defect that causes injury to human beings."
- United States v. Paramount Pictures, Inc., 334 U.S. 131 (1948) Practice of block booking and ownership of theater chains by film studios (vertical integration) constituted anti-competitive and monopolistic trade practices. As a result of the decision, the studios were forced to sell the chains they owned, an action which combined with the advent of television put them in a difficult financial position for almost a quarter-century, gave stars more bargaining power which ended the contract player system and along with it the Golden Age of Hollywood.
- Prima Paint Corp. v. Flood & Conklin Manufacturing Co., 388 U.S. 395 (1967) Where contracts have arbitration clauses, courts must treat the clause as a separate contract.
- Southland Corp. v. Keating, 465 U.S. 1 (1984) The Federal Arbitration Act (FAA) governs contracts executed under state law as well as federal law.
- NCAA v. Board of Regents of the University of Oklahoma, 468 U.S. 85 (1984) The NCAA's television plan of college football games violated the Sherman Antitrust Act, allowing the universities to negotiate television contracts.
- Mitsubishi Motors Corp. v. Soler Chrysler-Plymouth, Inc., 473 U.S. 614 (1985) Statutory claims as well as contractual ones are arbitrable under the FAA.
- Unocal Corp. v. Mesa Petroleum Co., 493 A.2d 946 (Delaware Supreme Court 1985) A board of directors may only try to prevent a take-over where it can be shown that there was a threat to corporate policy and the defensive measure adopted was proportional and reasonable given the nature of the threat.
- Revlon, Inc. v. MacAndrews & Forbes Holdings, Inc., 506 A.2d 173 (Delaware Supreme Court 1986) in certain limited circumstances indicating that the "sale" or "break-up" of the company is inevitable, the fiduciary obligation of the directors of a target corporation are narrowed significantly, the singular responsibility of the board being to maximize immediate stockholder value by securing the highest price available.
- United States v. Microsoft Corp., 253 F.3d 34 (D.C. Cir. 2001) An attempt by the U.S. government to break up Microsoft as an illegal monopoly.
- AT&T Mobility LLC v. Concepcion, 563 U.S. 333 (2011) The FAA pre-empts state laws prohibiting contracts from barring class-action arbitration.
- National Collegiate Athletic Association v. Alston, 594 U.S. 20-512 (2021) The NCAA's restrictions on providing college athletes with non-cash compensation for academic-related purposes violated the Sherman Antitrust Act.

=== Copyright/Patents ===
- Wheaton v. Peters, 33 U.S. 591 (1834) There is no common law copyright after a work's publication, and court reporters cannot hold copyrights on the cases compiled in the course of their work. Notable for being the first United States Supreme Court ruling on copyright.
- Burrow-Giles Lithographic Co. v. Sarony, 111 U.S. 53 (1884) Congress's extension of copyright to cover photography was within constitutional limits.
- Bleistein v. Donaldson Lithographing Co., 188 U.S. 239 (1903) Advertisements are copyrightable despite their fundamentally commercial nature.
- Shostakovich v. Twentieth Century-Fox Film Corp., 196 Misc. 67 (N.Y. Sup. Ct. 1948) First case to recognize moral rights of authorship in the United States.
- Diamond v. Chakrabarty, 447 U.S. 303 (1980) Genetically modified organisms can be patented. According to the court a living, man-made micro-organism is patentable subject matter as a "manufacture" or "composition of matter" within the meaning of the Patent Act of 1952.
- Sony Corp. of America v. Universal City Studios, Inc., 464 U.S. 417 (1984) Manufacturers of home video recording machines cannot be liable for contributory copyright infringement for the potential uses by their purchasers because the devices are sold for legitimate purposes and have substantial non-infringing uses. Personal use of the machines to record broadcast television programs for later viewing constitutes fair use.
- Selle v. Gibb, 741 F. 2d 896 (7th Cir. 1984) Substantial similarity is not enough in the absence of proof of access. Evidence of access must extend beyond mere speculation. De rigueur, not a Supreme Court case but only of the Court of Appeals of the Seventh Circuit, and therefore binding precedent only within its jurisdiction (Illinois, Indiana, and Wisconsin).
- Harper & Row v. Nation Enterprises, 471 U.S. 539 (1985) The first copyright case to reach the Court involving fair use after the Copyright Act of 1976 codified it into law. The Court thus provided guidance in how to apply the four-factor test for fair use.
- Feist Publications, Inc. v. Rural Telephone Service Company, Inc., 499 U.S. 340 (1991) Originality, not sweat of the brow, is required for a work to obtain copyright protection.
- Campbell v. Acuff-Rose Music, Inc., 510 U.S. 569 (1994) Parody qualifies as fair use under copyright law. With this case the Court accepted transformative use as part of a fair-use defense against infringement.
- A&M Records, Inc. v. Napster, Inc., 239 F.3d 1004 (9th Cir. 2001) Peer-to-peer (P2P) file-sharing service Napster could be held liable for contributory infringement and vicarious infringement of copyrights.
- Association for Molecular Pathology v. Myriad Genetics, Inc., 569 U.S. 576 (2013) Naturally occurring DNA sequences, even when isolated from the body, cannot be patented, but artificially created DNA is patent eligible because it is not naturally occurring.
- Alice Corp. v. CLS Bank International, 573 U.S. 208 (2014) Software that merely uses generic computing hardware to perform a pre-existing abstract idea is not patent eligible.

=== Other ===
- Swift v. Tyson, 41 U.S. 1 (1842) Federal courts hearing cases were bound to follow the statutory laws of states that they were asked to enforce, but not the state's common law. The goal was to encourage the development of a federal common law. (Overruled by Erie Railroad Co. v. Tompkins (1938))
- Luther v. Borden, 48 U.S. 1 (1849) Established the political question doctrine in controversies arising under the Guarantee Clause of Article Four of the United States Constitution.
- Selective Draft Law Cases, 245 U.S. 366 (1918) The Selective Service Act of 1917 and, more generally, conscription do not violate the Thirteenth Amendment's prohibition of involuntary servitude or the First Amendment's protection of the freedom of thought.
- Dillon v. Gloss, 256 U.S. 368 (1921) Congress may set a deadline for the ratification of a new constitutional amendment if it wishes to do so.
- Connally v. General Construction Co., 269 U.S. 385 (1926) The U.S. Supreme Court established the vagueness doctrine whereby a statute is void for vagueness and unenforceable if it is too vague for the average citizen to understand or if a term cannot be strictly defined and is not defined anywhere in such law.
- Village of Euclid v. Ambler Realty Co., 272 U.S. 365 (1926) Zoning laws are not an unreasonable extension of local police power and do not have the character of arbitrary fiat.
- Erie Railroad Co. v. Tompkins, 304 U.S. 64 (1938) Federal courts in diversity jurisdiction cases must apply the law of the states in which they sit, including the judicial doctrine of the state's highest court, where it does not conflict with federal law. There is no general federal common law.
- Coleman v. Miller, 307 U.S. 433 (1939) A proposed amendment to the Constitution is considered pending before the states indefinitely unless Congress establishes a deadline by which the states must act. Furthermore, Congress—not the courts—is responsible for deciding whether an amendment has been validly ratified.
- Burford v. Sun Oil Co., 319 U.S. 315 (1943) Created a new abstention doctrine, under which federal courts in a diversity jurisdiction can let state courts hear cases under certain circumstances.
- Reid v. Covert, 354 U.S. 1 (1957) The Constitution supersedes all treaties ratified by the Senate.
- Gravel v. United States, 408 U.S. 606 (1972) The privileges of the Constitution's Speech or Debate Clause enjoyed by members of Congress also extend to Congressional aides, but not to activity outside the legislative process.
- Canterbury v. Spence, 464 F.2d. 772 (D.C. Cir. 1972) In medical malpractices cases, informed consent is required of the patient and no expert is required for the case to be heard by a jury.
- Colorado River Water Conservation District v. United States, 424 U.S. 800 (1976) Greatly revised and extended the circumstances under which the abstention doctrine, whereby federal courts can decline jurisdiction they would otherwise assert, applies.
- Anderson v. Liberty Lobby, Inc., 477 U.S. 242 (1986) Set the standard for what parties must establish in evidence to be granted summary judgement in federal civil cases and how courts should evaluate those motions. Since such motions are extremely common, Anderson has become the most-cited Supreme Court case.
- Daubert v. Merrell Dow Pharmaceuticals, 509 U.S. 579 (1993) Scientific evidence that is admitted in federal court must be valid and relevant to the case at hand.

== See also ==
- Anticanon
- List of overruled United States Supreme Court decisions
- Test case (law)
