= Baxstrom v. Herold =

- Supreme Court of the United States

Argued December 9, 1965 Decided February 23, 1966
- Full case name: Baxstrom v. Herold, State Hospital Director
- Citations: 383 U.S. 107 (more) 86 S. Ct. 760; 15 L. Ed. 2d 620; 1966 U.S. LEXIS 2214

Holding
- Denial of jury review and judicial determination of mental illness for prisoners who are to be civilly committed after the end of a penal sentence violates equal protection of the laws.

Court membership
- Chief Justice Earl Warren Associate Justices Hugo Black · William O. Douglas; Tom C. Clark · John M. Harlan II; William J. Brennan Jr. · Potter Stewart; Byron White · Abe Fortas

Case opinions
- Majority: Warren, joined by Douglas, Clark, Harlan, Brennan, Stewart, White, Fortas
- Concurrence: Black (in judgment)

Baxstrom v. Herold, 383 U.S. 107 (1966), was a case decided by the Supreme Court of the United States pertaining to the civil commitment of prisoners at the end of their sentences. It held that statutory procedure in New York State that treated prisoners differently than non-prisoners in the civil commitment process were a violation of equal protection of the laws.

In 1959, Johnny K. Baxstrom was convicted of second degree assault and sentenced to prison in the New York State system. He was certified insane by a prison physician and transferred to Dannemora State Hospital, a hospital and prison for the criminally insane. Baxstrom was scheduled for release in 1961, but Dannemora's director filed for his civil commitment, presenting evidence that he remained insane and dangerous. The New York Surrogate's Court approved the civil commitment but the New York State Department of Mental Hygiene determined he was not suitable for care in a civil hospital. He remained at Dannemora, although under the custody of the Department of Mental Health instead of the Department of Correction. He twice filed for habeas corpus and was declined both times. He requested transfer to a civil institution and, despite a supporting statement from a state attorney, was declined. Following a series of appeals, the Supreme Court granted certiorari.

The Court held that Baxstrom was denied equal protection of the laws in two ways. New York denied him a jury review of his civil commitment, as would be allowed if he was being civilly committed not at the end of a prison sentence. He was also civilly committed in a prison without a judicial determination that he was dangerously mentally ill. It also described New York's classification of inmates as dangerously mentally ill or not as "capricious".

Around a thousand civilly committed individuals were released from Dannemora and Matteawan State Hospital due to this decision. A psychological study of those released found that less than 3% of those released had later returned to prison or a hospital for the criminally insane. This result was used to argue that psychiatrists overestimated the danger posed by their patients.
