= Katzenbach v. McClung =

- Supreme Court of the United States

Argued October 5, 1964 Decided December 14, 1964
- Full case name: Nicholas Katzenbach, Acting Attorney General, et al. v. Ollie McClung, et al.
- Citations: 379 U.S. 294 (more) 85 S. Ct. 377; 13 L. Ed. 2d 290; 1964 U.S. LEXIS 2188; 1 Empl. Prac. Dec. (CCH) ¶ 9713

Case history
- Prior: 233 F. Supp. 815 (N.D. Ala. 1964)

Holding
- Section 201(a), (b), and (c) of the Civil Rights Act of 1964 which forbids discrimination by restaurants offering to serve interstate travelers or serving food that has moved in interstate commerce is a constitutional exercise of the commerce power of Congress. United States District Court for the Northern District of Alabama reversed.

Court membership
- Chief Justice Earl Warren Associate Justices Hugo Black · William O. Douglas; Tom C. Clark · John M. Harlan II; William J. Brennan Jr. · Potter Stewart; Byron White · Arthur Goldberg

Case opinions
- Majority: Clark, joined by Warren, Harlan, Brennan, Stewart, White
- Concurrence: Black
- Concurrence: Douglas
- Concurrence: Goldberg

Laws applied
- Title II of the Civil Rights Act of 1964

Katzenbach v. McClung, 379 U.S. 294 (1964), is a landmark decision of the U.S. Supreme Court which unanimously held that Congress acted within its power under the Commerce Clause of the United States Constitution in forbidding racial discrimination in restaurants as this was a burden to interstate commerce.

== Background ==
Ollie's Barbecue, was a family-owned restaurant that operated in Birmingham, Alabama, and seated 220 customers. It was opened in 1926 by James Ollie McClung. By 1964, James's son, Ollie McClung Sr., and his grandson, Ollie McClung Jr., owned and operated the barbecue joint. It was located on a state highway and was 11 blocks from an Interstate Highway. In a typical year, approximately half of the food it purchased from a local supplier originated out-of-state. It catered to local families and white-collar workers and provided take-out service to African American customers.

Congress passed the Civil Rights Act of 1964 outlawing segregation based on race, color, religion, or national origin in all public accommodations engaged in interstate commerce, including restaurants. One section of the act, Title II, was specifically intended to grant access to public facilities such as hotels, restaurants, and public recreation areas. On the same day, the Supreme Court heard challenges to Title II from a motel owner and from Ollie McClung. Both claimed that the federal government had no right to impose any regulations on small, private businesses. Both ultimately lost. Ollie McClung had won an initial round in the United States District Court for the Northern District of Alabama when he received an injunction preventing the government from enforcing Title II against his restaurant. But then Attorney General Nicholas Katzenbach appealed this decision to the U.S. Supreme Court.

== Decision ==
McClung argued that the Civil Rights Act was unconstitutional, at least as applied to a small, private business such as his. McClung further argued that the amount of food purchased by Ollie's that actually crossed state lines was so minuscule that Ollie's effectively had no effect on interstate commerce. The customers at Ollie's were considered "regulars," and the McClungs recognized most of them by name or by face. Based on their lack of advertising and the location of the restaurant, they did not believe they served any interstate customers. In fact, Hugo Black's wife, Elizabeth S. Black, confirmed, "Nobody is a stranger in that place." Consequently, McClung argued that Congress had no power to regulate Ollie's Barbecue under the Commerce Clause.

The court ruled unanimously that the Civil Rights Act is constitutional and that it was properly applied against Ollie's Barbecue.

Justice Clark wrote the majority opinion, with concurrences by Justices Black, Douglas, and Goldberg. In section 2 of the opinion, the Court agreed with McClung that Ollie's itself had virtually no effect on interstate commerce. In section 4 of the opinion, the Court held that racial discrimination in restaurants had a significant impact on interstate commerce and so Congress has the power to regulate this conduct under the Commerce Clause. The Court's conclusion was based on extensive Congressional hearings on the issue. The Court cited testimony that African Americans spent significantly less time in areas with racially segregated restaurants and that segregation imposed an artificial restriction on the flow of merchandise by discouraging African Americans from making purchases in segregated establishments. The Court gave the greatest weight to evidence that segregation in restaurants had a "direct and highly restrictive effect upon interstate travel by Negroes."

In Section 5 of the decision, the Court affirmed previous decisions that Congress has the authority to regulate local intrastate activities if the activities significantly affect interstate commerce in the aggregate, citing United States v. Wrightwood Dairy Co., Wickard v. Filburn, Gibbons v. Ogden, and United States v. Darby Lumber Co.

The appellees objected to Congress' approach in determining what affects commerce, the court held, “Where we find that the legislators, in light of the facts and testimony before them, have a rational basis for finding a chosen regulatory scheme necessary to the protection of commerce, our investigation is at an end.”

== Subsequent developments ==
After decades in operation, Ollie's Barbecue moved to the suburb of Pelham in 1999 and closed in 2001.

== See also ==
- Heart of Atlanta Motel v. United States
- Civil Rights Movement
