= United States v. Johnson (1966) =

- Supreme Court of the United States

Argued November 10, 15, 1965 Decided February 24, 1966
- Full case name: United States v. Thomas Francis Johnson
- Citations: 383 U.S. 169 (more) 86 S. Ct. 749; 15 L. Ed. 2d 681; 1966 U.S. LEXIS 2213

Case history
- Prior: Cert. to the United States Court of Appeals for the Fourth Circuit

Court membership
- Chief Justice Earl Warren Associate Justices Hugo Black · William O. Douglas; Tom C. Clark · John M. Harlan II; William J. Brennan Jr. · Potter Stewart; Byron White · Abe Fortas

Case opinions
- Majority: Harlan, joined by Clark, Stewart, Fortas
- Concur/dissent: Warren, joined by Douglas, Brennan
- Black and White took no part in the consideration or decision of the case.

United States v. Johnson, 383 U.S. 169 (1966), is a United States Supreme Court case.

== Background ==
Former Congressman Thomas Francis Johnson was convicted in the United States District Court for the District of Maryland on seven counts of violating the federal conflict of interest statute, 18 USC 281, and on one count of conspiring to defraud the United States in violation of 18 USC 371. At the trial, there was evidence admitted, as well as argument by counsel, relating to the authorship, content, and motivation of a speech which the defendant allegedly made on the floor of the House of Representatives in pursuance of a conspiracy designed to give assistance, in return for compensation, to certain savings and loan associations which had been indicted on mail fraud charges.

The Court of Appeals for the Fourth Circuit set aside the conviction on the conspiracy count, holding that the government's allegations with respect to the defendant's having conspired to make this speech were barred by Article I Section 6 of the United States Constitution, which provides that Senators and Representatives shall not be questioned in any other place for any speech or debate in either House; and the Court of Appeals, finding that the evidence adduced under the unconstitutional aspects of the conspiracy count had infected the entire prosecution, ordered a new trial on the other counts.

== Opinion of the Court ==
On certiorari, the United States Supreme Court affirmed. In an opinion by Harlan, J., it was held that

(1) the prosecution on the conspiracy count, being dependent upon an intensive inquiry with respect to the speech on the floor of the House, violated the speech or debate clause of Article I section 6, so as to warrant the granting of a new trial on the conspiracy count, with all elements offensive to the speech or debate clause to be eliminated, and
(2) there was no occasion to review the Court of Appeals' assessment of the record with respect to its holding that the defendant was entitled to a new trial on the other counts.

=== Dissent ===
Warren, Ch. J., joined by Douglas and Brennan, JJ., concurred in holding (1), supra, but dissented from holding (2), supra.
