= Surowitz v. Hilton Hotels Corp. =

- Supreme Court of the United States

Argued January 20, 1966 Decided March 7, 1966
- Full case name: Dora Surowitz v. Hilton Hotels Corporation et al.
- Citations: 383 U.S. 363 (more) 86 S. Ct. 854; 15 L. Ed. 2d 807; 1966 U.S. LEXIS 2989

Case history
- Prior: 342 F.2d 596 (7th Cir. 1965)

Holding
- The Federal Rules of Civil Procedure do not require dismissal of cases where the record shows grave fraud charges based on reasonable beliefs growing out of careful investigation.

Court membership
- Chief Justice Earl Warren Associate Justices Hugo Black · William O. Douglas; Tom C. Clark · John M. Harlan II; William J. Brennan Jr. · Potter Stewart; Byron White · Abe Fortas

Case opinions
- Majority: Black, joined by Douglas, Clark, Harlan, Brennan, Stewart, and White
- Concurrence: Harlan
- Fortas and Warren took no part in the consideration or decision of the case.

Surowitz v. Hilton Hotels Corp., 383 U.S. 363 (1966), was a case in which the Supreme Court of the United States held that the Federal Rules of Civil Procedure did not require courts to summarily dismiss fraud cases when the complaints were based on a thorough examination. In other words, the court was not required to dismiss a lawsuit simply because it had been designed by someone else on behalf of a plaintiff who was not sophisticated enough to have done it alone.

== Background ==
Dora Surowitz, a stockholder in Hilton Hotels Corporation, filed a lawsuit on behalf of herself and other stockholders charging the corporation's officers and directors with fraud. The 60-page complaint was signed by Surowitz's counsel in compliance with Rule 11 of the Federal Rules of Civil Procedure. Pursuant to Rule 23(b), the complaint was verified by Surowitz, who stated that some of the allegations were true and that, "on information and belief," she thought the others were true. In an oral examination by opposing counsel, Surowitz, an immigrant with practically no formal education and limited knowledge of the English language, showed that she did not understand the complaint, and that, in signing the verification, she relied on her son-in-law's explanation of the facts.

Suowitz's son-in-law was Irving Brilliant, a gifted economist and investment advisor who Suowitz had gone to when she wanted to invest her savings in 1957. Then, in 1962, Suowitz had received a mailer about a stock buyback program. Not being able to read it, she showed it to Brilliant, who immediately came to believe that Hilton Hotels was committing fraud. Brilliant worked with an attorney he knew to design the lawsuit on Surowitz's behalf, but she needed to be the client because she was the one with standing to sue.

Upon learning about Brilliant's role in the case, opposing counsel then moved to dismiss the complaint on the ground that it was a sham, and that Surowitz was not a proper party plaintiff. Surowitz's attorney filed two affidavits, one by himself and the other by Surowitz's son-in-law, an investment advisor, demonstrating that extensive investigation had preceded the filing of the complaint. Despite the affidavits, the federal District Court dismissed the suit with prejudice on the ground that petitioner's affidavit was false and a sham. The Seventh Circuit Court of Appeals affirmed, although noting that "many of the material allegations of the complaint are obviously true, and cannot be refuted."
