= Murder of Lemuel Penn =

American murder victim (1915–1964)

Lemuel Augustus Penn
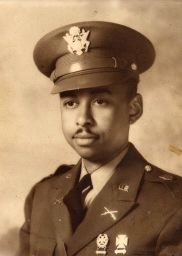
- Lt. Col. Lemuel A. Penn
- Born: September 19, 1915; Washington, D.C., U.S.
- Died: July 11, 1964 (aged 48); Madison County, Georgia, U.S.
- Burial place: Arlington National Cemetery
- Military career
- Allegiance: United States of America
- Branch: United States Army
- Service years: 1942 – 1964
- Rank: Lieutenant Colonel
- Conflicts: World War II: New Guinea Campaign; Philippines Campaign
- Awards: Bronze Star

Lemuel Augustus Penn (September 19, 1915 – July 11, 1964) was the Assistant Superintendent of Washington, D.C. public schools, a decorated veteran of World War II and a Lieutenant Colonel in the United States Army Reserve who was murdered by members of the Ku Klux Klan, nine days after the passage of the Civil Rights Act of 1964.

An African American, Lemuel Penn joined the Army Reserve from Howard University and served as an officer in World War II in New Guinea and the Philippines, earning a Bronze Star. When he was murdered at the age of 48, he had been an assistant administrator for the public schools in Washington, D.C., and the father of two daughters and one son, Linda, 13, Sharon, 11, and Lemuel Jr., 5. In the 1940s, Penn had worked for Gunnar Myrdal on the landmark study of race relations, An American Dilemma, and is cited in that book's acknowledgments.

== Murder ==
Penn was driving home, together with two other black Reserve officers, to Washington, D.C. from Fort Benning, Georgia returning from their annual summer training camp. Their Chevrolet Biscayne was spotted by three white members of the United Klans of America – James Lackey, Cecil Myers and Joseph Howard Sims – who noted its D.C. license plates. Sims then said "That must be one of President Johnson's boys", evidently motivated by racial hatred. The group followed the car with their Chevy II, with Sims saying "I'm going to kill me a nigger". The shooting occurred on a Broad River bridge on Georgia State Route 172 in Madison County, Georgia, near Colbert, twenty-two miles north of the city of Athens. Just before the highway reaches the Broad River, the Klansmen's Chevy II pulled alongside Penn's Biscayne. Cecil Myers raised a shotgun and fired; from the back seat, Howard Sims did the same. Penn was killed instantly.

Authorities quickly identified Myers, Sims, and Lackey as those responsible. Sims and Myers were tried in state superior court but found not guilty by an all-white jury in September, 1964. Federal prosecutors eventually charged both for violating Penn's civil rights under the Civil Rights Act of 1964. On June 27, 1966, criminal proceedings began against Sims, Myers, Lackey, and three other local Klansmen, Herbert Guest, Denver Phillips, and George Hampton Turner. Two weeks later, Sims and Myers were found guilty of conspiracy charges by a federal district court jury; their four co-defendants, however, were acquitted. Sims and Myers were each sentenced to 10 years in prison, then the statutory maximum for the charge. They each served about six years. Howard Sims was shot and killed by flea market owner Edward U. Skinner with a shotgun during an argument on June 1, 1981, at the age of 58. James Lackey died at age 66 in 2002. Cecil Myers died in 2018 at the age of 79.

The historical marker erected by the Georgia Historical Society, the Lemuel Penn Memorial Committee, and Colbert Grove Baptist Church at Georgia Highway 172 and Broad River Bridge on the Madison/Elbert County Border states:

On the night of July 11, 1964 three African-American World War II veterans returning home following training at Ft. Benning, Georgia were noticed in Athens by local members of the Ku Klux Klan. The officers were followed to the nearby Broad River Bridge where their pursuers fired into the vehicle, killing Lt. Col. Lemuel Penn. When a local jury failed to convict the suspects of murder, the federal government successfully prosecuted the men for violations under the new Civil Rights Act of 1964, passed just nine days before Penn's murder. The case was instrumental in the creation of a Justice Department task force whose work culminated in the Civil Rights Act of 1968.

Penn's murder was the basis of the Supreme Court case United States v. Guest, in which the Court affirmed the ability of the government to apply criminal charges to private conspirators, who with assistance from a state official, deprive a person of rights secured by the Fourteenth Amendment of the United States Constitution.

== Bibliography ==
- Alschuler, Albert W. (February 1995). "Racial Quotas and the Jury". Duke Law Journal. 44 (4). Duke University School of Law: 704–743. doi:10.2307/1372922. JSTOR 1372922.
- Thompson, Jim (July 11, 2004). "Highway 172 revisited". Athens Banner-Herald.
