= United States v. Guest =

- Supreme Court of the United States

Argued November 9, 1965 Decided March 28, 1966
- Full case name: United States, Appellant v. Herbert Guest et al., Appellees
- Citations: 383 U.S. 745 (more) 86 S. Ct. 1170; 16 L. Ed. 2d 239

Case history
- Prior: Defendants' motions to dismiss indictment sustained, United States v. Guest, 246 F. Supp. 475 (M.D. Ga. 1964); question of jurisdiction postponed to hearing on merits, 381 U.S. 932 (1965).

Holding
- 1. Private individuals who conspire with state officials to deny African Americans the equal protection of the laws may be prosecuted for conspiracy against rights, even when the indictment does not name any state officials.; 2. Private individuals who conspire against the exercise of the right to interstate travel, with or without state involvement, may likewise be so prosecuted.

Court membership
- Chief Justice Earl Warren Associate Justices Hugo Black · William O. Douglas; Tom C. Clark · John M. Harlan II; William J. Brennan Jr. · Potter Stewart; Byron White · Abe Fortas

Case opinions
- Majority: Stewart, joined by unanimous (Part I); Black, Clark, Harlan, White, Fortas (Part II); Black, Clark, White, Fortas (Part III)
- Concurrence: Clark, joined by Black, Fortas
- Concur/dissent: Harlan
- Concur/dissent: Brennan, joined by Warren, Douglas

Laws applied
- U.S. Const. amend. XIV; 18 U.S.C. § 241; Civil Rights Act of 1964

United States v. Guest, 383 U.S. 745 (1966), is a landmark decision of the US Supreme Court authored by Justice Potter Stewart, in which the court extended the protection of the 14th Amendment to citizens who suffer rights deprivations at the hands of private conspiracies, where there is minimal state participation in the conspiracy. The Court also held that there is a Constitutional right to travel from state to state.

While the majority avoided the question of whether Congress, by appropriate legislation, has the power to punish private conspiracies, Justice Clark, writing in concurrence, asserted that "there now can be no doubt that the specific language of §5 empowers the Congress to enact laws punishing all conspiracies - with or without state action - that interfere with 14th Amendment rights." Justice Hugo Black and Justice Abe Fortas joined Clark's concurrence.

== Background ==
The case arose out of the killing of Lemuel Penn, an African-American reserve officer who was returning from active duty training to Washington, D.C., where he was Assistant Superintendent of Washington, D.C. public schools. He was traveling north in a car with two other black Reserve officers when he was shot and killed on a bridge, just nine days after the Civil Rights Act of 1964 passed.

The murder happened in Madison County, Georgia, and the alleged killers were charged but acquitted there by an all-white jury. The federal indictment in question arose after the acquittal. In District Court, the six defendants successfully "moved to dismiss the indictment on the ground that it did not charge an offense under the laws of the United States," according to the case. The Supreme Court reversed.

The argument revolved around whether or not Congress intended to apply equal protection rights of the 14th Amendment to citizens deprived of said rights on public facilities, such as roads and bridges or interstate commerce facilities, by private actors with the collusion of public actors. In this case, "public actors" were considered the police who responded to the murderers' false reports that Penn and his cohorts had committed crimes.

== Opinion of the Court ==
The question was whether or not 18 U.S.C. §241 of the Criminal Code could be applied to protect the rights of equal protection and due process secured by the Fourteenth Amendment to the United States Constitution. The Court held that it could.

=== Concurrence/dissents ===
Justice William Brennan, Chief Justice Earl Warren and Justice William O. Douglas concurred in part and dissented in part.

Brennan wrote: "(I) believe that §241 reaches such a private conspiracy, not because the 14th Amendment of its own force prohibits such a conspiracy, but because §241, as an exercise of congressional power under §5 of that Amendment, prohibits all conspiracies to interfere with the exercise of a 'right (secured) by the Constitution.'"

== See also ==
- List of United States Supreme Court cases, volume 383
