= List of United States Supreme Court cases, volume 383 =

This is a list of all United States Supreme Court cases from volume 383 of the United States Reports:

Case name	Citation	Date decided
Graham v. John Deere Co.	383 U.S. 1	1966
United States v. Adams	383 U.S. 39	1966
Linn v. Plant Guard Workers	383 U.S. 53	1966
Rosenblatt v. Baer	383 U.S. 75	1966
Louisville & N.R.R. Co. v. United States	383 U.S. 102	1966
McMorris v. California	383 U.S. 102	1966
Hemphill v. Wash. State Tax Comm'n	383 U.S. 103	1966
Operating Eng'rs v. Deacon	383 U.S. 103	1966
Nolan v. Rhodes	383 U.S. 104	1966
HC&D Moving & Storage Co. v. Yamane	383 U.S. 104	1966
Vitoratos v. Maxwell	383 U.S. 105	1966
Nielsen v. Neb. State Bar Ass'n	383 U.S. 105	1966
Dyson v. Maryland	383 U.S. 106	1966
Baxstrom v. Herold	383 U.S. 107	1966
United States v. Ewell	383 U.S. 116	1966
Brown v. Louisiana	383 U.S. 131	1966
United States v. Johnson (1966)	383 U.S. 169	1966
Idaho Sheet Metal Works, Inc. v. Wirtz	383 U.S. 190	1966
Swann v. Adams	383 U.S. 210	1966
Carnation Co. v. Pac. Westbound Conf.	383 U.S. 213	1966
Accardi v. Pa. R.R. Co.	383 U.S. 225	1966
Stevens v. Marks	383 U.S. 234	1966
Hicks v. District of Columbia	383 U.S. 252	1966
Hopson v. Texaco, Inc.	383 U.S. 262	1966
Levine v. United States	383 U.S. 265	1966
Arizona v. California	383 U.S. 268	1966
Harrison v. Schaefer	383 U.S. 269	1966
Callender v. Florida	383 U.S. 270	1966
Crawford Cnty. Bar Ass'n v. Faubus	383 U.S. 271	1966
Fribourg Nav. Co. v. Comm'r	383 U.S. 272	1966
South Carolina v. Katzenbach	383 U.S. 301	1966
Surowitz v. Hilton Hotels Corp.	383 U.S. 363	1966
Pate v. Robinson	383 U.S. 375	1966
A hearing about competency to stand trial is required under the Due Process Clause.
Perry v. Com. Loan Co.	383 U.S. 392	1966
United Transps., Inc. v. United States	383 U.S. 411	1966
Ciesielski v. Ohio	383 U.S. 411	1966
Sociedad de Mario Mercado e Hijos v. Puerto Rico	383 U.S. 412	1966
Book Named "John Cleland's Memoirs of a Woman of Pleasure" v. Attorney General of Mass.	383 U.S. 413	1966
Ginzburg v. United States	383 U.S. 463	1966
Mishkin v. New York	383 U.S. 502	1966
Brenner v. Manson	383 U.S. 519	1966
Kent v. United States	383 U.S. 541	1966
Malat v. Riddell	383 U.S. 569	1966
Cross v. California	383 U.S. 573	1966
Motorlease Corp. v. United States	383 U.S. 573	1966
Bridges v. Biloxi	383 U.S. 574	1966
Kukich v. Serbian E. Orthodox Church	383 U.S. 574	1966
Cnty. Bd. of Elections v. United States	383 U.S. 575	1966
Pugach v. New York	383 U.S. 575	1966
ICC v. Atl. Coast Line R.R. Co.	383 U.S. 576	1966
Consolo v. Fed. Mar. Comm'n	383 U.S. 607	1966
United States v. O'Malley	383 U.S. 627	1966
FTC v. Borden Co.	383 U.S. 637	1966
Harper v. Virginia State Board of Elections	383 U.S. 663	1966
Comm'r v. Tellier	383 U.S. 687	1966
Automobile Workers v. Hoosier Cardinal Corp.	383 U.S. 696	1966
Mine Workers v. Gibbs	383 U.S. 715	1966
United States v. Guest	383 U.S. 745	1966
United States v. Price	383 U.S. 787	1966
Clayton Chem. & Packaging Co. v. United States	383 U.S. 821	1966
Hollywood Baseball Ass'n v. Comm'r	383 U.S. 824	1966
DeGregory v. Att'y Gen.	383 U.S. 825	1966
Miller v. Virginia	383 U.S. 831	1966
Drum v. Seawell	383 U.S. 831	1966
Estate of Leyman v. Comm'r	383 U.S. 832	1966
Balt. & Ohio R.R. Co. v. Atchison T. & S.F.R.R. Co.	383 U.S. 832	1966
Jenkins v. Maryland	383 U.S. 834	1966
