= Doctrine of repair and reconstruction =

The doctrine of repair and reconstruction in United States patent law distinguishes between permissible repair of a patented article, which is the right of an owner of property to preserve its utility and operability, and impermissible reconstruction of a patented article, which is patent infringement. The doctrine is explained in Aro Mfg. Co. v. Convertible Top Replacement Co. The Aro case states the rule in these terms:

The decisions of this Court require the conclusion that reconstruction of a patented entity, comprised of unpatented elements, is limited to such a true reconstruction of the entity as to "in fact make a new article," after the entity, viewed as a whole, has become spent. In order to call the monopoly, conferred by the patent grant, into play for a second time, it must, indeed, be a second creation of the patented entity. …Mere replacement of individual unpatented parts, one at a time, whether of the same part repeatedly or different parts successively, is no more than the lawful right of the owner to repair his property.

An extension of the doctrine is a right to modify the product to enhance its functionality, such as to make it operate faster or with a different size of product. The Supreme Court said in Wilbur-Ellis Co. v. Kuther that such a right was "kin to repair for it bore on the useful capacity of the old combination, on which the royalty had been paid."

The House of Lords declared a similar principle—the doctrine of non-derogation from grants—concerning car owners' repair and replacement of automobile parts, in British Leyland Motor Corp. v. Armstrong Patents Co.
