= Minerva Surgical, Inc. v. Hologic, Inc. =

- Supreme Court of the United States

Argued April 21, 2021 Decided June 29, 2021
- Full case name: Minerva Surgical, Inc. v. Hologic, Inc.
- Docket no.: 20-440
- Citations: 594 U.S. ___ (more)

Case history
- Prior: Decided for Hologic in the United States District Court for the District of Delaware. Appealed to the United States Circuit Court for the Federal Circuit, decision of the District Court affirmed and vacated in part.

Holding
- Assignor estoppel is a recognized principle, however it only applies when a claim of invalidity is actually inconsistent with representations of the patents validity.

Court membership
- Chief Justice John Roberts Associate Justices Clarence Thomas · Stephen Breyer; Samuel Alito · Sonia Sotomayor; Elena Kagan · Neil Gorsuch; Brett Kavanaugh · Amy Coney Barrett

Case opinions
- Majority: Kagan, joined by Roberts, Breyer, Sotomayor, Kavanaugh
- Dissent: Alito
- Dissent: Barrett, joined by Thomas, Gorsuch

Minerva Surgical, Inc. v. Hologic, Inc., 594 U.S. ___ (2021), was a United States Supreme Court case dealing with the principle of assignor estoppel and its application. The Supreme Court reaffirmed the principle of assignor estoppel, however with the exception that the doctrine is only applied when assignors assertions are actually consistent with previous representations as to the patent. The majority decision was written by Justice Elena Kagan, with Justice Samuel Alito and Justice Amy Coney Barrett filing separate dissenting opinions.

== Background ==
Csaba Truckai founded the company NovaCept, which invented the NovaSure medical system, which detects perforations in the uterus through the usage of Carbon Dioxide gas. NovaCept was acquired by Cytyc Corporation in 2004, which was then acquired by Hologic in 2007. Hologic received U.S. Patents 6,872,183 and 9,095,348 in 2005 and 2015 respectively. Truckai left NovaCept to found his own company, Minerva, Inc. and received permission to commercially distribute an Endometrial Ablation System.

Hologic, Inc. sued Minerva, Inc. for violations of U.S. Patents 6,872,183 and 9,095,348, both relating to the procedure of endometrial ablation, for the treatment of menorrhagia. Minerva argued that the patents were invalid in the first place, and challenged the patentability of both patents in the U.S. Patent Office. Hologic moved for summary judgment arguing the principle of assignor estoppel, which was granted. The jury awarded $4.7 million in damages to Hologic. Both Minerva and Hologic appealed for differing reasons. On Appeal to the Federal circuit, Minerva asked the court to "abandon the doctrine" of assignor estoppel on the basis that the doctrine is invalidated due to the Supreme Court abolishing the doctrine of licensee estoppel in Lear, Inc. v. Adkins, 395 U.S. 653 (1969), although the Federal Circuit Court rejected this argument. Minerva Surgical, Inc. filed a petition for a writ of certiorari on September 30, 2020.

== Assignor Estoppel ==
See main article: Assignor estoppel

Assignor estoppel is a legal doctrine that states that a claim of invalidity cannot be taken by a person who sells a patent (assignor). The doctrine was first recognized in the United States in Westinghouse Elec & Mfg. Co. v. Formica Insulation Co., 266 U.S. 342 (1924.)

== Judgement ==
In a 5–4 decision, the Supreme Court re-affirmed the principle of assignor estoppel, and rejected the argument of Minerva that the doctrine was repealed through the Patent Act of 1952. Writing for the majority, Justice Kagan wrote that "[assignor estoppel] applies when, but only when, the assignor's claim of invalidity contradicts explicit or implicit representations he made in assigning the patent."

Justice Barrett argued in the principal dissent that the Patent Act of 1952 precludes the principle of Assignor estoppel. Justice Alito, who also wrote a dissenting opinion, argued that neither the principal dissent nor the majority opinion are valid as neither answered the question as to whether Westinghouse Elec. & Mfg. Co. v. Formica Insulation Co., 266 U. S. 342 (1924) should be upheld or overruled.
