= Canon Kabushiki Kaisha v Green Cartridge Co (Hong Kong) Ltd =

1997 Judicial Committee of the Privy Council case

- Transcript: judgment

Court membership
- Judges sitting: Lord Browne-Wilkinson, Lord Lloyd of Berwick, Lord Hoffmann, Lord Hope of Craighead, Lord Hutton

Canon Kabushiki Kaisha v Green Cartridge Co (Hong Kong) Ltd is a 1997 decision of the Judicial Committee of the Privy Council (1) re-affirming the principle of UK copyright law that the copying of functional three-dimensional objects is an infringing reproduction of the drawings of the objects, and (2) limiting the doctrine of non-derogation from grants as to chattels to "the case in which the unfairness to the customer and the anticompetitive nature of the monopoly is as plain and obvious as it appeared to the House of Lords in the British Leyland case."

== Background ==
The plaintiff, a manufacturer of photocopiers and laser printers, incorporated the parts which might need replacing during the lifetime of a machine and a supply of toner in a disposable cartridge, which could be inserted in the machine by its owner when the toner had to be renewed. The plaintiff was therefore entitled, under LB (Plastics) Ltd. v. Swish Products Ltd., to artistic copyright in the drawings from which of the parts for the cartridge had been made, and by the same token the plaintiff had the exclusive right to reproduce the drawings in any material form, such as replacement toner cartridges.

The aftermarket in cartridges contributed significantly to the plaintiff's profits, and the initial cost of one of its machines was much lower than the aggregate cost of cartridges used during the life of the machine. In Hong Kong refillers of used cartridges had 40% of the cartridge market. The defendant manufactured new cartridges in Hong Kong for sale there and for export in competition with the plaintiff's cartridges.

In an action by the plaintiff in the High Court of Hong Kong the judge granted an injunction against the defendant, holding that by manufacturing cartridge parts by reverse engineering from the plaintiff's cartridge parts the defendant had indirectly reproduced in three-dimensional form the plaintiff's drawings from which those parts had been made, thereby infringing the plaintiff's copyright in those drawings. The High Court also held that the "spare parts exception" of the British Leyland case did not entitle the defendant to do so.

The Court of Appeal of Hong Kong, by a majority, allowed the defendant's appeal holding that the manufacture of cartridges did fall within that exception.

== Privy Council decision ==
Lord Hoffman, speaking for the Privy Council, was not receptive to the chain of reasoning in the speech of Lord Bridge in the case of British Leyland Motor Corp. v. Armstrong Patents Co. He observed:

This reasoning involves a somewhat unorthodox extension of what would normally be understood by the inherent right to repair one’s motor car. Of course one has a right to repair one’s car, as one has the right to cultivate one’s garden and indulge in all kinds of harmless activities. But such a right is not usually treated as entitling one to invade the property rights of others; for example, by taking a neighbour’s dahlias on the ground that this is the most economical way of going about it. It is hard to see why the appropriation of intellectual property rights should be any different.

Lord Hoffman then commented:

It is hard to escape the conclusion that although Lord Bridge felt driven to accept that Parliament had created intellectual property rights which covered the manufacture of three-dimensional parts by reverse engineering, he felt free to remedy what he saw as a legislative error by treating such rights as an inferior species of property which could be subordinated to the right to repair one’s motor car. Such prepotency over statute has not yet been accorded in this country even to human rights such as free speech.

Lord Hoffman then turned to the speech of Lord Templeman, of which he was also critical. He began by postulating -- "The principle of non-derogation is however based upon the presumed intention of the parties. The rights derived from the principle must have a consensual origin."

Lord Hoffman did state, however, that the principle of the British Leyland case derived from public policy considerations, but he denied (without explaining why) that the policy could "be regarded as truly founded upon any principle of the law of contract or property." He concluded, "It is of course a strong thing (not to say constitutionally questionable) for a judicially-declared head of public policy to be treated as overriding or qualifying an express statutory right." Furthermore, he did not perceive any oppressiveness or lack of equity in the position of the original manufacturer "to be able to exercise monopoly control over his aftermarket." Market forces would solve any problems:

For example, if customers are in a position to reckon the lifetime cost of one product (including purchases such as cartridges which will have to be made in the aftermarket) as against the lifetime cost of a competing product, then control of the aftermarket will not be anticompetitive. A manufacturer who charges too much for his cartridges will sell fewer of his machines. [It is] likely that purchasers with any degree of sophistication will be comparing machines on a lifetime cost basis.

Accordingly, the Privy Council ruled that the non-derogation doctrine of the British Leyland case had to be limited to its factual context:

Their Lordships are accordingly of the opinion that the features of unfairness and abuse of monopoly power which underlay the decision in the British Leyland case cannot be said to be plainly and obviously present in this case. The analogy with repair is not strong enough to bring the case within the exceptional doctrine which the House of Lords propounded. ...They will therefore humbly advise Her Majesty that the appeal should be allowed....

== Subsequent developments ==
In Mars U.K. Ltd. v. Teknowledge Ltd., the High Court of Justice, Chancery Division, considered the non-derogation doctrine in the wake of Green Cartridge. Mr. Justice Jacob interpreted Green Cartridge as holding that the British Leyland “spare parts exception applied only where it was plain and obvious that the replacement was analogous to a repair which an ordinary purchaser of an article would assume he could do for himself without infringing the manufacturer’s rights, or that the exercise of monopoly power by means of copyright would be against consumers’ interests." The court held that the circumstances of the Mars case—altering a coin changer to operate for changes made in UK coinage—did not warrant invocation of the non-derogation doctrine.
