= British Leyland Motor Corp v Armstrong Patents Co =

British Leyland Motor Corp. v Armstrong Patents Co.
- Court: House of Lords
- Citation: [1986] 1 A.C. 577, [1986] 1 All E.R. 850

Court membership
- Judges sitting: Lord Bridge; Lord Templeman; Lord Scarman; Lord Edmund-Davies; Lord Griffiths

British Leyland Motor Corp. v Armstrong Patents Co. is a 1986 decision of the House of Lords concerning the doctrine of non-derogation from grants. This doctrine is comparable to, but somewhat broader than, the doctrine of legal estoppel, assignor estoppel, or estoppel by deed in U.S. law. Under the doctrine of non-derogation from grants, a seller of realty or (after this decision) goods is not permitted to take any action (such as bringing an infringement action) that would lessen the value to the buyer of the thing sold.

== Background ==
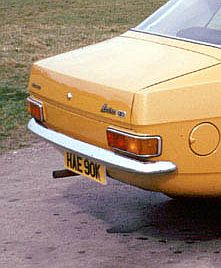
Rear view of Leyland Marina showing exhaust pipe

The factual context of the Leyland case was that British Leyland (BL), the owner of copyright in drawings of the exhaust pipe of a motor car (the Morris Marina) having sold or authorized the sale of the motor car, sought to use the law against copyright infringement to prevent the aftermarket sale of replacement exhaust pipes to purchasers of those motor cars. British Leyland's cars reproduced the drawings in a three dimensional form. Armstrong copied the exhaust pipes of BL's car and thus indirectly copied the drawings. BL sued Armstrong to enjoin the copying.

== Lower court rulings ==
BL were successful in the lower courts. The trial judge (Judge Foster) and an intermediate appellate judge (Lord Justice Oliver) rejected Armstrong's concept of implied licence as applied to these exhaust pipes. Consequently, the trial court entered an injunction against Armstrong, which the Chancery Division of the High Court of Justice upheld.

== House of Lords' ruling ==
The House of Lords allowed the appeal, however, and discharged the injunctions granted by Judge Foster; they remitted the cause back to the Chancery Division of the High Court of Justice "to do therein as shall be just and consistent with the Judgment of the House of Lords".

The court considered the application of various possible legal doctrines—such as implied licence or "some form of estoppel"—but rejected them in favor of non-derogation. Lord Bridge observed:

It seems to me that when one is considering machinery which is not the subject of any patent protection, it is unnecessary and may be misleading to introduce the concept of an implied licence. The owner of a car must be entitled to do whatever is necessary to keep it in running order and to effect whatever repairs may be necessary in the most economical way possible. To derive this entitlement from an implied licence granted by the original manufacturer seems to me quite artificial. It is a right inherent in the ownership of the car itself.

There is an inconsistency between marketing cars and thereby creating whatever rights attach to their ownership on the one hand and acting to restrain the free exercise of those rights on the other. The law does not countenance such inconsistencies.

In his separate opinion, Lord Templeman pointed out that an implied licence might be negatived by express language, under principles of freedom of contract, but that was not so when non-derogation instead is involved: "The right cannot be withheld by the manufacturer of the car by contract with the first purchaser and cannot be withheld from any subsequent owner." That is, the nature of property makes the right inherent and not a matter of freedom of contract.

This case appears to be the first one extending the non-derogation doctrine from cases involving realty to cases involving personal property (chattels). Lord Templeman seems to have recognized this point in his opinion. After describing the operation of the principle in various types of case involving land, he stated: "I see no reason why the principle that a grantor will not be allowed to derogate from his grant [of land] by using property retained by him in such a way as to render property granted by him unfit or materially unfit for the purpose for which the grant was made should not apply to the sale of a car."

This decision also re-affirmed the ruling in LB (Plastics) Ltd v Swish Products Ltd, stating that the rule of the Swish decision must now be regarded as "settled law" (that is, that under UK copyright law a physical object is an infringing copy of a technical drawing depicting the object) in a manner recognizable to an ordinary person.

== Subsequent developments ==
=== Green Cartridge case ===
In Canon Kabushiki Kaisha v Green Cartridge Co, the Privy Council considered the scope of the spare parts exception recognised by the House of Lords in the British Leyland case, in an appeal from the Court of Appeal of Hong Kong. Canon sold laser printers and copiers that consumed toner cartridges. GC went into the business of manufacturing and selling replacement toner cartridges for Canon machines. In the courts of Hong Kong it was accepted, in view of the decision of the House of Lords in the British Leyland case, that the manufacture of the parts by the defendant by reverse engineering from Canon's parts was an indirect reproduction in three-dimensional form of the drawings from which the parts had been made, and therefore a copyright infringement unless excused by the spare parts rule of the Leyland case. The Hong Kong trial court thought the Leyland doctrine inapplicable but the Court of Appeal reversed, holding it applicable.

The Privy Council did not accept the applicability of concepts of implied licence, non-derogation from grant, or inalienable right to repair one's property as bases for the Leyland spare parts doctrine. Instead the Privy Council said the doctrine was "an expression of what the House perceived as overriding public policy, namely the need to prevent a manufacturer from using copyright (as opposed to patents or design right) in order to control the aftermarket in spare parts." The Privy Council then turned to what in the United States has been considered the "Chicago School" method of legal analysis:

The question of whether it is contrary to the public interest for a manufacturer to be able to exercise monopoly control over his aftermarket cannot usually be answered without some inquiry into the relevant market. For example, if customers are in a position to reckon the lifetime cost of one product (including purchases such as cartridges which will have to be made in the aftermarket) as against the lifetime cost of a competing product, then control of the aftermarket will not be anticompetitive. A manufacturer who charges too much for his cartridges will sell less of his machines. The figures which their Lordships have already quoted for expenditure on the machine itself and on cartridges make it likely that purchasers with any degree of sophistication will be comparing machines on a lifetime cost basis.

The court said it thus found the question too complicated to be solved by broad generalisation. Moreover, "once one departs from the case in which the unfairness to the customer and the anticompetitive nature of the monopoly is as plain and obvious as it appeared to the House of Lords in British Leyland, the jurisprudential and economic basis for the doctrine becomes extremely fragile." The Privy Council did not perceive in this case "the features of unfairness and abuse of monopoly power which underlay the decision in British Leyland" as "plainly and obviously present." Therefore, they reversed the order of the Court of Appeal on the copyright issue and reinstated that of the trial court.

=== Mars v Teknowledge ===
In Mars U.K. Ltd. v. Teknowledge Ltd., the High Court of Justice, Chancery Division, considered the non-derogation doctrine set forth in the British Leyland case, in the wake and light of the Green Cartridge case. Mr. Justice Jacob interpreted Green Cartridge as holding that the British Leyland "spare parts exception applied" only when it was "plain and obvious" that the challenged act of replacement (here, altering the software) was analogous to a repair which an ordinary purchaser of an article would assume he could do for himself without infringing the manufacturer's rights, or that "the exercise of monopoly power by means of copyright would be against consumers' interests."

The court held that the circumstances of the Mars case—altering a coin changer so that it would operate for UK coinage by altering the software—did not warrant invocation of the non-derogation doctrine. The court brushed aside Teknowledge's public policy arguments: "I therefore conclude that there is no overwhelming public policy reason entitling those who purchase machines [for changing coins] to use Mars copyright and database rights to convert those machines for new coins."

=== Dyson v Qualtex ===
In Dyson Ltd v Qualtext (UK) Ltd, the Court of Appeal, in an opinion written by Lord Justice Jacob, rejected the appeal of a manufacturer and distributor of vacuum cleaner parts from a High Court judgment against it in a case brought by the vacuum cleaner manufacturer. Dyson sued Qualtex for copyright and unregistered design right infringement for creating and selling deliberate imitations of Dyson's original vacuum cleaner parts.

In 1988 Parliament supplemented the doctrine of the 1986 Leyland case with legislation providing two specific new exceptions, known as "must fit" and "must match"—meaning that spare parts could be made that corresponded to the configuration of the original product (as the exhaust pipe in the Leyland case, for example, bent and twisted to fit the pattern of the underside of the Morris Marina car) and they could be designed to correspond to the appearance of the original product in which the spare part is "to form an integral part" (for example, the right fender of a car must not be dissimilar in aesthetic appearance to the left fender). Qualtex sought to defend under "must fit" and "must match" but the court rejected this defence.

As he did in the Mars case, Justice Jacob construed the spare parts dealer's defences narrowly. As for Leyland, he said that the Green Cartridge case held that "the Leyland defence is limited to clear cases of anti-competitiveness, or those where the ordinary man would 'unquestionably assume that he could do for himself (or commission someone else to do)' ". He interpreted the 1988 legislation as a compromise between the interests of original equipment manufacturers (OEMs) and spare parts manufacturers—"on the one hand Parliament refused to create a general spare parts exception, and on the other hand clearly did not intend that OEMs should have absolute control over the manufacture of spares". (He did not refer to the interests of the general public.)

He interpreted the statute to require this rule (as stated in the High Court judgment):

But unless the spare parts dealer can show that as a practical matter there is a real need to copy a feature of shape or configuration because of some design consideration of the whole article, he is not within the exclusion. It is not enough to assert that the public "prefers" an exact copy . . . . In the absence of solid and reasoned evidence (which in the circumstances would have had to have been opinion evidence) I do not think it is possible to say that no-one would buy a non-replica handle, and I would be a little sceptical of assertions to that effect. It is conceivable they might, if there were a price differential which made it worthwhile. . . . A Dyson vacuum cleaner may well be purchased at least in part because of its design, but I would require some evidence were it to be said that the design preference of the customer for this piece of household utilitarianism would lead the customer to require it to keep its looks after a repair in the same way as a car is required to keep its looks. This is, I accept, somewhat speculative in the absence of solid evidence, but it is plausible and I certainly cannot find that that is wrong and Qualtex has not discharged its burden of showing it is right.

In denying Qualtex's appeal, the court concluded:

The overall lesson here is that the exceptions to UDR created by the Act do not give a carte blanche for pattern spares. Those who wish to make spares during the period of design right must design their own spares and cannot just copy every detail of the OEM's part. To be on the safe side they will have to make them different as far as is possible—for trying to navigate by the chart provided by this crude statute is a risky business.
