= Automotive aftermarket =

Automotive industry concerned with secondary parts

The automotive aftermarket is the secondary parts market of the automotive industry, concerned with the manufacturing, remanufacturing, distribution, retailing, and installation of all vehicle parts, chemicals, equipment, and accessories, after the sale of the automobile by the original equipment manufacturer (OEM) to the consumer. The parts and accessories for sale may or may not be manufactured by the OEM.

The aftermarket encompasses parts for replacement, collision, appearance, and performance. The aftermarket provides a wide variety of parts of varying qualities and prices for nearly all vehicle makes and models.

Consumers have the option of repairing their vehicles themselves (the "do-it-yourself" or "DIY" segment) or can take the vehicle to a professional repair facility (the "do-it-for me" or "DIFM" segment). The aftermarket helps keep vehicles on the road by providing consumers the choice of where they want their vehicles serviced, maintained, or customized.

== Size of the automotive aftermarket ==
The United States automotive aftermarket covering light-, medium- and heavy-duty vehicles is estimated to be worth $516 billion (2025). The U.S. automotive aftermarket contribute more than 1.9% to GDP according to Hedges & Company. The aftermarket employs nearly five million people who work at manufacturers, distributors, retailers and repair shops.

In the U.S., online sales of aftermarket accessories have increased year over year over traditional brick and mortar stores. In fact, according to Hedges & Company, "Total online eCommerce revenue for automotive parts and accessories in 2024 was at $42.4 billion in the U.S." That includes $21.7 billion from first-party 1P eCommerce websites and $20.7 billion from third-party 3P marketplaces.

Singapore, which does not have a domestic automobile industry, is an especially important destination for businesses exporting automotive parts and accessories due to its high automobile turnover stemming from the peculiarities of its driving laws. (In short, car owners are legally required to get rid of their cars after ten years of use and Singapore's compensation scheme to offset the registration fee of new cars has incentivized more frequent turnover.)

High automobile turnover and the preference for new parts means that the market for remanufactured and reconditioned auto parts is very small. Combined with a high demand for "accessories, car-care products, prestige items, and new spare parts," Singapore's automotive aftermarket is large. In fact, Singapore has become a major automotive components manufacturing base, as several leading multinational corporations (MNCs) have established international procurement offices as well as their Southeast Asia distribution centers.

In Canada, the automotive aftermarket is a C$19.4 billion industry that employs about 420,000 people.

In Australia, the automotive aftermarket industry in 2013 was estimated to generate a AUD$5.2 billion turnover, with 21000 staff, and 1400 manufacturers.

in Europe, the total volume of Independent Aftermarket (IAM) amounted to 127 billion Euros in 2015 (end-user prices without labor and tax). At that moment there were 54 parts traders with annual turnover over 100 mio Euros in Europe, 6 of them exceeded 1 billion Euros.

== Online versus brick-and-mortar aftermarket accessory vendors ==
Among online retailers, Amazon.com and eBay Motors are the largest sellers of aftermarket parts and accessories in the U.S. by both units sold and revenue, and are expected to grow 25% in 2014, far outstripping traditional chain stores.

As DIY parts sales soften at the retail counter, chain stores have pushed themselves into the DIFM commercial business, eating into distributors’ and wholesalers’ market share. Since 2007, DIY sales at the chain stores have fallen a total of 3% to 5%, while commercial sales have brought in a double-digit sales increase. AutoZone’s DIFM sales in 2013 alone increased over 13%.

Online sales of auto parts and accessories in the United States, including 3P marketplaces, are estimated at $42.4 billion in 2024.

== Legality & Enforcement ==
Automobile manufacturers have attempted to hinder or suppress automotive aftermarket sales by means of copyright or patent infringement litigation. For example, in British Leyland Motor Corp. v Armstrong Patents Co. in the UK, the House of Lords decided in 1986 that Leyland could not claim copyright infringement in order to prevent the aftermarket sale of replacement tailpipes to purchasers of those motor cars.

Aro Mfg. Co. v. Convertible Top Replacement Co. is a 1961 U.S. Supreme Court case in which the Court redefined the U.S. patent law doctrine of repair and reconstruction: "No element, not itself separately patented, that constitutes one of the elements of a combination patent is entitled to patent monopoly, however essential it may be to the patented combination and no matter how costly or difficult replacement may be."

In 2005 Harley-Davidson filed a patent and trademark infringement lawsuit against two aftermarket engine manufacturers producing drop-in replacements for Harley's engines, namely S&S Cycle and Delkron, Inc. Harley accused S&S and Delkron of copying parts for Twin Cam engines and using Harley trademarks without permission. S&S argued that the suit was without any legal basis, and asserted that "a mutually beneficial relationship existed" between them and Harley.

Automotive aftermarket includes parts that are subject to legislation and oversight by the EPA (Environmental Protection Agency). The EPA has been guided largely by the Clean Air Act and the Right to Repair Act, however, they publish information on their enforcement strategies on their website. Some parts related to emissions are regulated at a federal level and at a state level. The most well known state for enforcement is California, which, uses the CARB (California Air & Resources Board) guidelines. Parts that are most often legislated are performance related and range from air intake systems to turbo chargers, fueling solutions, headers, downpipes, catalyst replacements, and exhaust systems that modify emissions components. (California code of regulations)

== See also ==
- Aftermarket exhaust parts
