= K. (C.) v K. (J.) =

Irish Supreme Court case

C.K v J.K and Fmcg (Notice Parties)
- Coat of arms of Ireland
- Court: Supreme Court of Ireland
- Full case name: C.K (Applicant) v J.K (Respondent) and F.McG (Notice Party)
- Decided: 31 March 2004
- Citation: [2004] IESC 21; [2004] 1 IR 224

Case history
- Appealed from: High Court
- Appealed to: Supreme Court

Court membership
- Judges sitting: Denham J, Murray J, McGuinness J, Fennelly J, McCracken J.

Case opinions
- The Supreme Court held that the doctrine of estoppel could not be used to change the status of a person, when the status, as a matter of law, never actually changed
- Decision by: Denham J.

Keywords
- Divorce | Family Law Act | Judicial Separation | Marital Status | Estoppel

K. (C.) v K. (J.) [2004] IESC 21; [2004] 1 IR 224, is an Irish Supreme Court case in which the Court held that the doctrine of estoppel (where the court can prevent someone going back on his/her word) could not be used to change the status of a person, when the status, as a matter of law, never actually changed.

== Background ==
The respondent had previously been married. This marriage had failed and the respondent sought to secure a divorce against it. He was assured by an attorney he met socially that a divorce could be secured for him without any difficulty, despite the absence of certain required legal requirements of residency among other matters.

Documents had been prepared based on incorrect information regarding the address of residence referring to Ohio. The respondent then travelled to Ohio to attend the divorce hearing and the divorce had subsequently been secured.

In 1983, the appellant and respondent were married at the Registry Office in Dublin. The application of registry was on the basis the respondent was a bachelor. There had been no reservation or impediment noted during the marriage ceremony. When the appellant's and respondent's relationship broke down in 2001, the appellant sought a decree of judicial separation in the Circuit Court. In response to this, the respondent, filed his counter claim, seeking a declaration pursuant to s29(1) of the Family Law Act 1995 that the divorce he obtained in the United States of America could not be recognised in Ireland, and a declaration pursuant to s29(1) of the Family Law Act, that the marriage originally entered into by the appellant and the respondent was void and had no effect. The question was whether the Circuit Court had the jurisdictions, regarding the findings it made, to conclude that the respondent could be estopped from denying his marriage to the appellant. The Circuit Court Judge set out his findings as follows:

"I have found that in this case, given the particular facts of the case, justice can only be achieved by the use of estoppel whereby the respondent would not be allowed challenge, at this remove, the validity of his original divorce."

He held:

"I believe that justice between the parties can only be achieved by prohibiting or estopping the respondent from attacking the validity of his divorce and by definition the validity of his marriage to the applicant. However, given the law as stated, I accept that the concept of estoppel as a remedy, well suited to offer a solution in this case, is a judge made and developed principle. I believe it is preferable for the parties to this action that prior to a final determination of the case that the Supreme Court be consulted on this issue."

The question posed by the Circuit Court Judge set out for the Supreme Court was:

"Whether [the Circuit Court is] entitled to hold in these proceedings as a matter of law...that the respondent is estopped from denying that he is married to the applicant"

== Holding of the Supreme Court ==
The Court accepted that the Ohio divorce would not be recognised in the Irish State. Consequently, the ceremony of marriage between the appellant and the respondent that took place in 1983 was invalid. However, it was acknowledged that such a situation would allow for considerable injustice to the appellant and also the respondent's previous wife who believed she had been divorced from the respondent. In answering the question posed, however, the Supreme Court answered in the negative - the respondent could not be estopped from denying that he was married to the appellant. It was held the injustice flowed from the fraudulent actions of the respondent inducing the appellant into an invalid marriage. However, legal marital status is a matter of importance not just to the parties to the marriage and their family, but for the world at large. An invalid marriage could not be made valid when it was void from the very beginning.

Denham J, in delivering her judgment made her conclusion in light of the decision set out in Gaffney v Gaffney where it was established "that estoppel may not be used, to change a person's status when that has not occurred, to prevent a party demonstrating that a foreign divorce decree was given without jurisdiction".

The Court held that "[u]nless Gaffney is overruled by this court it is a governing authority on this issue"

McGuinness J, Fennelly J and McCracken J agreed with this conclusion. Murray J also, fully agreed with this judgement, added that the appellant would have an actionable remedy on the grounds of fraudulent misrepresentation. Murray J went on to note that "[i]n order for such an action to be considered...an appropriate remedy for the infringement of constitutional rights any order which a court may make where deceit is established should provide a reasonable measure of compensation for the consequential and foreseeable loss which a plaintiff has sustained".

== Subsequent developments ==
This case was considered in AR v DR, where it was highlighted that Denham J had observed the decision in Gaffney v Gaffney regarding how "the prohibition on the use of estoppel in cases where marital status is relevant has been a kernel concept of Irish law". Acknowledging the wariness of the courts in allowing for the reliance on estoppel regarding a party's legal or family status.
