= McDonald v Attorney-General =

- Court: Court of Appeal of New Zealand
- Full case name: Russell John McDonald v Attorney-General
- Decided: 20 June 1991
- Transcript: High Court judgment

Court membership
- Judge sitting: Holland J

McDonald v Attorney-General is a cited case in New Zealand regarding satisfying the requirement in promissory estoppel for reliance by the other party.

== Background ==
McDonald was a Southland wheat farmer. The Wheat Board had advised wheat growers that wheat grown that had a baking score of 12 or higher would be purchased by the Board, and that such graded wheat could only be sold to the Board. In knowledge of all this McDonald expected the Board to purchase his wheat. However, due to an outbreak of wheat mould in Southland, the board found it had little demand for such wheat, and as a consequence, the Board refused to purchase his wheat.

McDonald eventually sold his wheat to other parties, at a loss, and he sued the Board for compensation.

== Held ==
The court ruled that promissory estoppel applied here, and awarded McDonald compensation, effectively turning promissory estoppel from a shield, into a sword. Holland J stated "In converting promissory estoppel from a "shield" to a "sword" care must be taken not to extend it further into a weapon of the nature of an atomic bomb that will destroy the existing framework of legal principle by way of provision for compensation in the fields of both contract and tort"
