= Aro Manufacturing Co. v. Convertible Top Replacement Co. =

- Supreme Court of the United States

Argued October 13, 17, 1960 Decided February 27, 1961
- Full case name: Aro Manufacturing Co. v. Convertible Top Replacement Co.
- Citations: 365 U.S. 336 (more) 81 S. Ct. 599; 5 L. Ed. 2d 592; 1961 U.S. LEXIS 1944; 128 U.S.P.Q. (BNA) 354

Case history
- Prior: 270 F.2d 200 (1st Cir. 1959); cert. granted, 362 U.S. 902 (1960).
- Subsequent: 312 F.2d 52 (1st Cir. 1962); cert. granted, 372 U.S. 958 (1963); affirmed in part, reversed in part, 377 U.S. 476 (1964); motion to dismiss granted, 240 F. Supp. 805 (D. Mass. 1965); affirmed, 352 F.2d 400 (1st Cir. 1965); cert. denied, 383 U.S. 947 (1966).

Holding
- Petitioners were not guilty of either direct or contributory infringement of the patent.

Court membership
- Chief Justice Earl Warren Associate Justices Hugo Black · Felix Frankfurter; William O. Douglas · Tom C. Clark; John M. Harlan II · William J. Brennan Jr. Charles E. Whittaker · Potter Stewart

Case opinions
- Majority: Whittaker, joined by Warren, Black, Douglas, Clark
- Concurrence: Black
- Concurrence: Brennan (in judgment)
- Dissent: Harlan, joined by Frankfurter, Stewart

Aro Manufacturing Co. v. Convertible Top Replacement Co., 365 U.S. 336 (1961), is a United States Supreme Court case in which the Court redefined the U.S. patent law doctrine of repair and reconstruction. The decision is sometimes referred to as Aro I because several years later the Supreme Court readdressed the same issues in a second case in 1964 involving the same parties—Aro II.

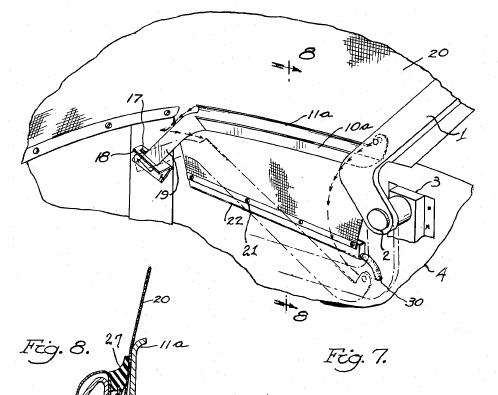
Convertible Top Assembly of U.S. Pat. No. 2,569,724

== Background ==
The specific controversy in Aro concerned the replacement of a fabric top portion of an automobile convertible roof assembly. After some years, the tops became torn or discolored, often as a result of bird droppings, and owners wished to replace the cloth part without buying an entire new convertible top assembly. The patent covered the combination of the cloth and a number of metal parts that remained serviceable. Aro was a company that engaged in the supply of replacement cloth tops that fit various car models. Because Aro declined to pay a royalty to the patentee, patent infringement litigation followed.

== Previous state of law ==
Prior to the Supreme Court's decision in Aro I, when a purchaser of a patented product replaced some components of the product (because they were worn or otherwise unsatisfactory to the owner of the product), U.S. lower courts made the decision whether the conduct was permissible repair or impermissible reconstruction of the patented article by using a complex, multi-factor balancing test.

The courts weighed against one another factors such as the following, although there was no common denominator for them:

- the cost of the replaced component or components relative to the cost of the entire article,
- the number of replaced components versus the total number of components,
- the relative life spans of the different components, and
- whether the replaced component was the heart, essence, or “gist” of the invention.

Thus the court of appeals had said in its opinion that the fabric "is not a minor or relatively inexpensive component" of the patented combination, or an element that would expectedly wear out after a very short period of use—although its "expectable life span" is shorter than that of the other components—and, for these reasons, it concluded that "an owner would [not] rationally believe that...he was making only a minor repair" in replacing the worn-out fabric, but that, instead, the replacement "would be counted a major reconstruction".

The Supreme Court's own few precedents, however, tended to paint with a broader brush instead of resorting to the foregoing factor analysis. The Supreme Court stated that “the distilled essence” of the prior case law came from Judge Learned Hand, who ruled in 1948 that "[t]he [patent] monopolist cannot prevent those to whom he sells from...reconditioning articles worn by use, unless they in fact make a new article".

Accordingly, the Court rejected the factor analysis approach of lower courts to repair and reconstruction.

== Opinion of the Court ==
The Court reviewed the prior case law concerning repair and reconstruction, with a principal focus on its own rather than lower court opinions. It rejected the analysis of those lower courts using a many-factor, balancing test and instead held the proper test to be this:

The decisions of this Court require the conclusion that reconstruction of a patented entity, comprised of unpatented elements, is limited to such a true reconstruction of the entity as to "in fact make a new article," after the entity, viewed as a whole, has become spent. In order to call the monopoly, conferred by the patent grant, into play for a second time, it must, indeed, be a second creation of the patented entity. …Mere replacement of individual unpatented parts, one at a time, whether of the same part repeatedly or different parts successively, is no more than the lawful right of the owner to repair his property. Measured by this test, the replacement of the fabric involved in this case must be characterized as permissible "repair," not "reconstruction."

The Court emphasized that an infringement analysis for making the subject matter claimed in a combination patent could not single out one element of the combination as "essential," but could find infringement only when all elements were made:

No element, not itself separately patented, that constitutes one of the elements of a combination patent is entitled to patent monopoly, however essential it may be to the patented combination and no matter how costly or difficult replacement may be. While there is language in some lower court opinions indicating that "repair" or "reconstruction" depends on a number of factors, it is significant that each of the three cases of this Court, cited for that proposition, holds that a license to use a patented combination includes the right "to preserve its fitness for use so far as it may be affected by wear or breakage."

On that basis, the replacement of the old fabric top was permissible repair rather than impermissible reconstruction. The opinion for the majority, by Justice Whittaker, largely accepted the arguments that the U.S. Justice Department made as amicus curiae.

== UK repair law ==
A comparable result to that of Aro has been reached under UK law, although the latter goes somewhat further by allowing automobile repair to extend to the replacement of worn out parts subject to intellectual property protection. In British Leyland Motor Corp v Armstrong Patents Co, the House of Lords held that Leyland could not prevent a third party (Armstrong) from supplying replacement tailpipes to purchasers of Leyland motor cars. despite the existence of an intellectual property right (copyright) in the tailpipe design. To allow Leyland the relief it sought would have the effect of derogating from the title Leyland had conveyed to car owners when they purchased the cars. This rationale is comparable to the doctrine of legal estoppel under US law.

Although Armstrong was a third party not in privity with Leyland, and a stranger to the car purchase transaction, nonetheless Armstrong was permitted to rely on the non-derogation rights of the car owners relative to Leyland (as Aro was permitted to rely on the rights of car owners to repair their property and keep it in good order). In his speech, Lord Bridge stated, “What the owner needs, if his right to repair is to be of value to him, is the freedom to acquire a previously manufactured replacement exhaust system in an unrestricted market.” In this regard, he observed that it was infeasible for the general public to make their own tailpipes or go to the village blacksmith to have them specially made. A comparable principle allowing third-party assertion of another's rights has been recognized in US law when the rights owner is not in a position effectively to assert his rights for himself.

== Commentary ==
Some commentary approved the Aro decision as providing more certainty and better balance of the public's and original equipment manufacturers' interests. Other commentators disapproved of the decision's "short shrift" for the contributory infringement claims of manufacturers to the exclusive right to sell repair parts for their products.

=== Bageman ===
James C. Bageman explains the issue of repair vs. reconstruction as "another aspect of the problem of how far to extend the patent monopoly," because "to decide whether or not the repair doctrine is a defense to an allegation of contributory infringement is to decide whether the patentee should receive any additional compensation over and above what he received through the initial sale of his invention during the functional life of that device." The Aro test largely denies patentees this source of income. The issue then is providing sufficient incentive to inventors so that they will create and disclose inventions. "Compensation beyond this 'sufficiency' level is arguably unwarranted." Bageman considers it "doubtful that by removing this source of compensation, prospective inventors will lose the economic incentive to create." He therefore concludes: "The Aro I test seems to provide a dearer, more well-defined standard. The resulting benefit to the producer and consumer of unpatented parts seems to outweigh the risk of loss of creative incentive resulting from the rejection of the [prior, multi-factor] test."

=== Caffrey ===
Thomas F. Caffrey sees Aro as setting a standard under which repair will be the usual result and reconstruction a rare case. He observes that Justice Black, concurring in a separate opinion, is quite outspoken in describing the disadvantages of a "several-factor" test found in prior lower court opinions. Black "makes every effort to point up the deleterious effect that the rule advocated by the minority would have on small business enterprises" by "deterring small businessmen from engaging in activities that would have been found, if pursued, to be non-infringing." Caffrey then asks: "is the single test, propounded by the majority, as vague for its simplicity as the 'several-factor' test allegedly is for its complexity?" He responds that "the answer is decidedly no." In his view, inexplicitness is a virtue:

Any attempts to clarify the "making" test, be it by example or description or otherwise, would necessarily have the effect of dispelling any vestiges of simplicity that might surround it. Such attempts would undo all which the Court set out to accomplish in this opinion. . . . Thus, significantly, the Court has laid down an unequivocal test, unhampered by confusing, weakening qualifications. As a result, combination patent holders and small business entrepreneurs will better appreciate the limits of their respective offices, and the courts will less frequently find before them an issue of repair or reconstruction.

=== Schafran ===
Julius Schafran criticized the decision because "at present it appears that the rights afforded by a combination patent have been diminished, and it seems likely that findings of forbidden reconstruction will in the future become exceedingly scarce."

=== Sease ===
Edmund Sease reviews the post-Aro case law. He classifies the cases into four categories:

1. those cases where the part replaced made the combination patentable over the prior art;
2. those cases where the part replaced is of a highly perishable nature and proper use exhausts the life of the part replaced in a short period of time;
3. those cases where the part replaced is expected to last as long as the combination but has not done so because of unusual circumstances; and
4. those cases where proper use of the combination destroys it.

Each type of case has different equities, he argues, and "therefore it is only fair that the results in cases falling into each of the four categories be different."

In case (1), Sease argues, "where the part replaced made the combination patentable over the prior art, the total contribution of the patentee to the art is his teaching of the combination per se as well as the teaching of the use of one particular element in the combination," Aro would wrongly find repair. But "[s]ince the patent grant, if it is to be meaningful, should protect the patentee's entire patentable contribution to the art, it is submitted that in cases such as this the replacement of the element (assuming it is not perishable), which had never been before used in the combination, should amount to infringing reconstruction."

In case (2), where the part replaced is of a perishable nature, Sease agrees with Aro that replacement is repair: "The rightful user of a patented combination in most instances pays a fair consideration for that right of use, and to say that his right of use lasts only as long as a perishable element of the combination makes little sense from either a business or legal point of view."

In case (3), "where the part replaced is expected to last as long as the combination, but because of extenuating circumstances did not, it is submitted that equities lie in favor of holding replacement to be only permissible repair."

In case (4), "where proper use of the combination necessitates its destruction, it is submitted that equities lie in favor of holding any rebuilding of a combination as infringing reconstruction," because "when consideration was given for the right of use, and both parties knew that proper use dictated destruction, to hold that the rightful user after using and destroying the combination can salvage any single existing element and thereafter remake the combination without liability to the patentee, is certainly contrary to the reasonable intentions of the parties at the time of the bargained-for exchange, as well as a serious dilution of the value of the patent."

Sease claims his proposals are superior to Aro because that case's "sweeping rule fails to distinguish the differing equitable considerations involved where the part replaced made the combination patentable over the prior art and was not of a perishable nature and was not a part expected to last as long as the combination that was destroyed because of unusual circumstances; the rule of Aro I further fails to distinguish the situation where proper use of the combination involves a destruction of the combination."
