= Driving in Singapore =

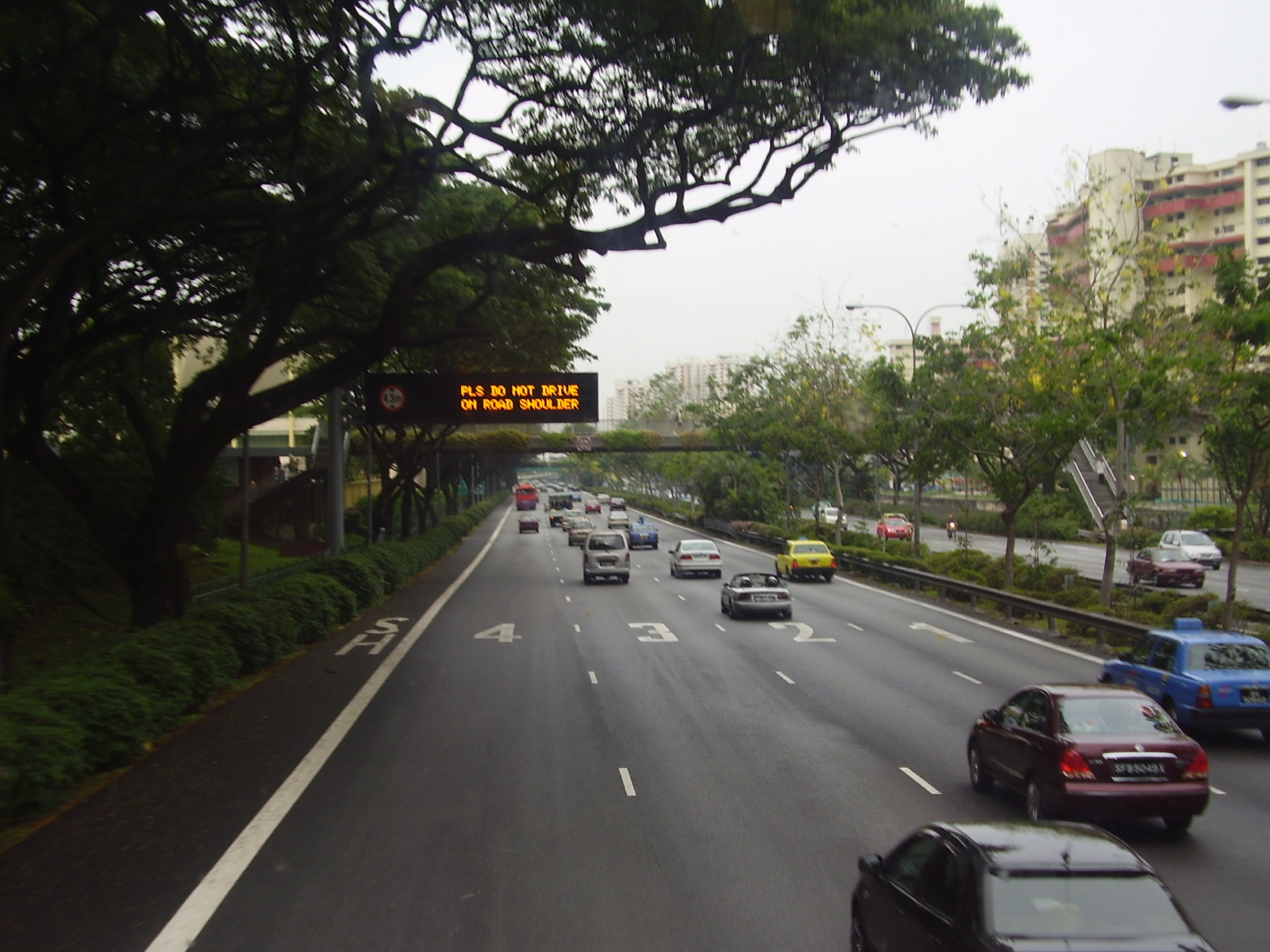
The Pan Island Expressway, one of the main expressways in the Singapore road network

In Singapore, cars and other vehicles drive on the left side of the road, as in neighbouring Malaysia, due to its British colonial history (which led to British driving rules being adopted in India, Australia, New Zealand, and Hong Kong as well). As a result, most vehicles are right-hand drive. However, exemptions have been made to allow foreign vehicles and construction machineries to utilise the road space of Singapore. As such, vehicles with left hand drive configurations are required to either be driven with a sign indicating "LEFT-HAND-DRIVE" or towed.

The per-capita car ownership rate in Singapore is approximately 12 cars per 100 people (or 1 car per 8.25 people).

== History ==
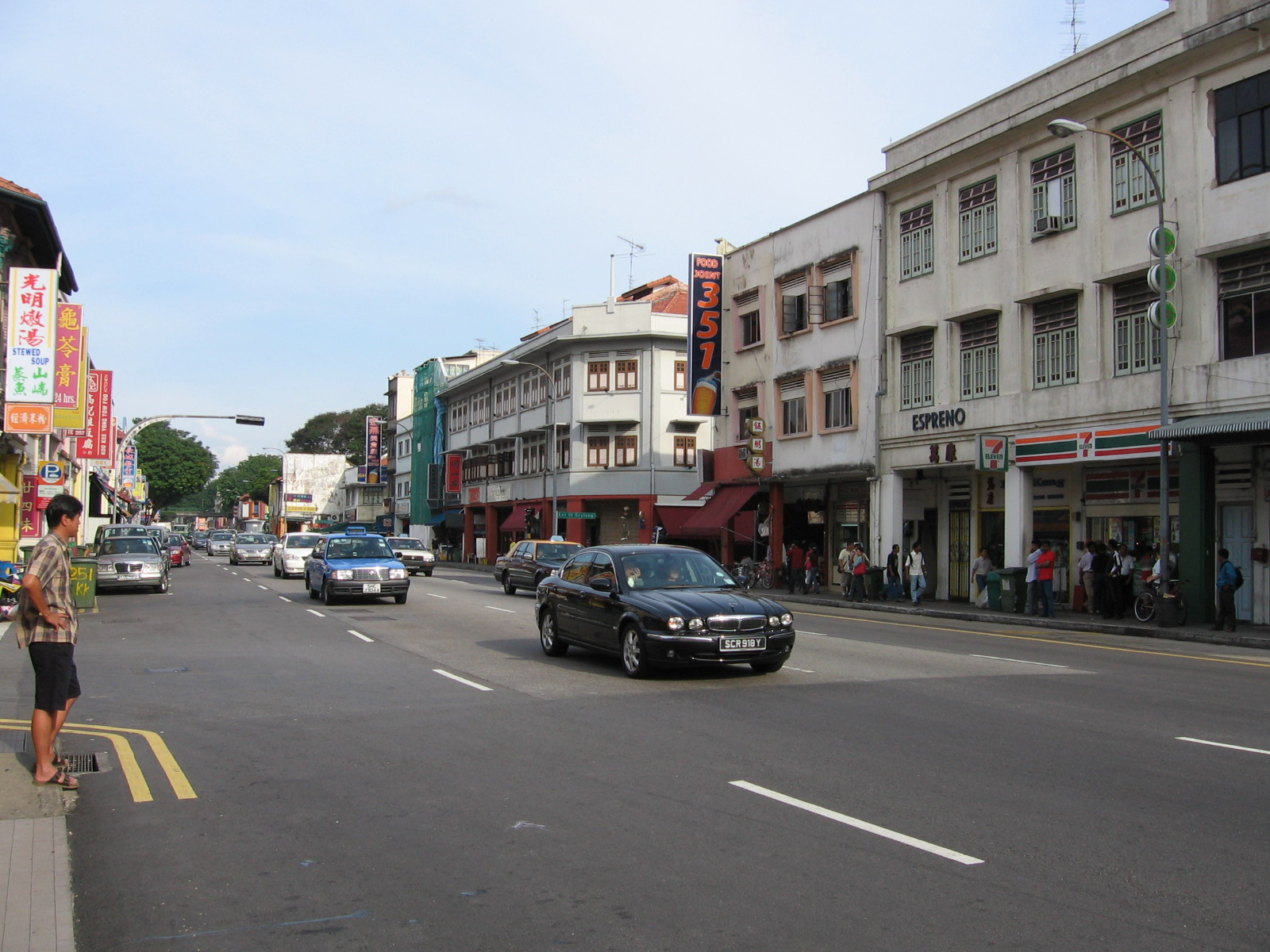
Geylang Road was one of the earliest roads built in Singapore.

The earliest roads in Singapore, after its founding in 1819, were laid out in the Jackson Plan of 1822 in keeping with Sir Stamford Raffles's directions. A grid system was adopted for the town with roads for carriages being 16 yards (15 m) wide, and those for horses four yards wide. Pedestrian paths along the roadsides were two yards wide, allowing room for two people to walk abreast and giving rise to the five-foot ways that came to be associated with the sheltered walkways along roadside shops.

These roads were fairly advanced for the time, with Macadam surfacing used on High Street as early as 1821. Roads were also constructed across the rest of the island, although they were usually unsurfaced. Most of the roads were accessible to the kampong roads by 1845, and finally to the HDB developed roads since the 1960s. Currently, there are a lot of roads and expressways in Singapore. The first motor car was introduced in Singapore in 1896.

As with many other urban areas of the time, all the earliest modes of transport were replaced by today's transport.

== Driving licence ==
=== Obtaining a driving licence ===
A class 3 or class 3A licence permits the holder to drive motorcars weighing less than 3,000 kg when unladen and to carry no more than seven passengers. In addition, the holder may drive a motor tractor or other motor vehicles with an unladen weight of less than 2,500 kg. A class 3A licence limits the holder to drive motor vehicles without a clutch pedal, typically automatic transmission cars, whereas a class 3 licence allows the holder to drive all motor vehicles. Class 3A drivers are not allowed to drive manual transmission cars.

Drivers must be 18 years old to qualify for a licence including applying for theory lessons. Once a driver passes the Basic Theory Test (BTT), a Provisional Driving Licence (PDL) which lasts for six months before December 2017, 2 years validity after 1 December 2017, must be applied for before taking the practical driving lesson. It is an offence to learn to drive without a valid PDL licence. However, a student can choose to apply and pass the Final Theory Test (FTT) before applying for a PDL and starting driving lessons. The last stage of obtaining a driving licence is the practical driving test, for which a student must have a FTT pass result slip and a valid PDL. Failure to do so will cause the test to be rejected by the Traffic Police Tester.

The driving theory tests consist of 50 questions to be answered within 50 minutes; to pass, students must answer 45 out of the 50 questions correctly. Results are shown immediately after the test on the same touchscreen monitor.

=== Foreign drivers in Singapore ===
The Singapore Traffic Police require foreigners residing in Singapore to have a valid foreign driver's licence and to be at least 18 years old.

Conversion to a Singaporean licence is often possible for certain classes of vehicles.

Foreigners who have obtained a Singapore licence are supplied with a limited-duration licence which needs to be renewed between one month before expiry to three years after expiry. After this period, the conversion procedure or licensing theory and practical tests must be taken all over again.

All foreigners visiting or residing in Singapore will need to produce an IDP (International Driving Permit) produced by their home country with an English Driving Licence. The IDP (International Driving Permit) lasts for a year. However, Countries under ASEAN are exempt from carrying an IDP. Foreigners must present both a valid Singapore Driving License and Employment Pass/FIN card with at least 6 months of validity.

=== Licence renewal ===
No renewal of a driving licence is required for Singapore citizens and permanent residents since the introduction of the photocard licence. The driving licence is for the normal lifespan of the person and can be surrendered upon request to the Traffic Police. If the person passes away, the licence will have to be surrendered to the Traffic Police for cancellation, similar to National Registration Identity Card (NRIC). It is an offence for any persons to continue or to possess or use any other person's identity cards listed above without authorization.

A person who commits 12 demerit points and is above 80 years old is subject to early termination of the driving licence indefinitely. Additionally, no new drivers over 79 years old are accepted. Random medical check-up screenings will be required for those over 62 years old for all drivers that still want to drive.

For Class 4, 5, bus and taxi driving licences, annual medical check-ups are done from 70 years old all the way to 80. The upper age limit is 81.

=== Using vehicles registered on a different holder ===
In Singapore, it is illegal to ride a motorcycle if the rider's name is not entered in the insurance contract. For each motorcycle, only one co-rider can be entered, but the procedure to change the co-rider is viable. The only exception is commercial insurance, where any rider can use the vehicle. Only a business registered company can register for a commercial insurance.

=== Driver Improvement Points System ===
The Driver Improvement Points System (DIPS) is a system whereby demerit points will be added to the driver's record. The system is meant to deter drivers from infringing the rules-of-the-road and, if they do, suspend their driving licence for a period of time. This system requires offenders to retest and pass the driving test again from the beginning.

If a driver accumulates 24 demerit points within a period of two years, he/she will be suspended from driving for three months. If he/she had been suspended before, he/she will only be allowed to accumulate less than 12 demerit points in a period of 12 months. It is a driving licence scheme where those foreigners who have their licence suspended will have their licences affected, as this is from other countries. A driving licence is a statutory requirement and is commonly used worldwide.

Currently, drivers are given demerit points if they commit certain traffic offences such as speeding and passengers not fastening their seat belts.

== Roads in Singapore ==
=== Electronic Road Pricing ===
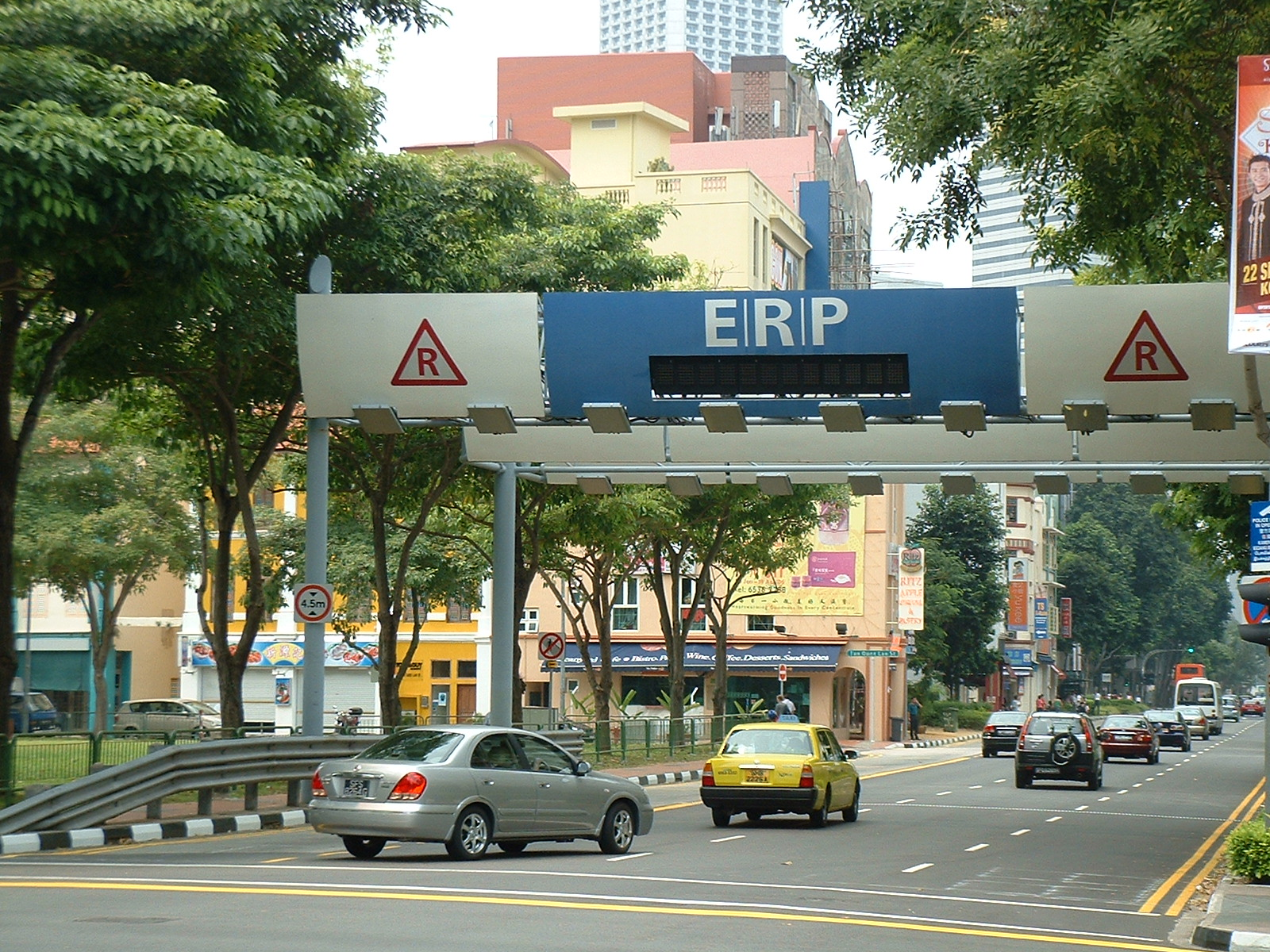
ERP gantry

The Land Transport Authority (LTA) in Singapore implemented an Electronic Road Pricing (ERP) scheme to deter traffic congestion during peak hours at various roads. The ERP scheme requires electronic gantries to be placed over the road at designated locations and that cars be equipped with an In-Vehicle Unit (IU), a rectangular device pasted on the inside bottom right of the front windscreen from the driver's view, which will deduct the toll price from a CashCard. The CashCard must be inserted into the device, and failure to do so is in violation of the law. There is no charge for entering the area during certain non-peak times.

=== Parking ===
The cost of parking in many upgraded car parks can be deducted from the CashCard inserted in the IU of the vehicle, thus eliminating the need for the car park to have an attendant.

Some car parks in Singapore are equipped with overhead sensors that can detect whether the lot position is filled or not. This information is processed and displayed in signs around the car park, directing drivers to areas where there are free spaces.

‘Season Parking’ is an initiative created by the Housing & Development Board (HDB) for motorists to engage in long-term parking of their vehicles in HDB car parks. Parking lots are denoted in red and on the lower decks of the carpark. Some carparks denote an all-day parking for season parking holders only where lots are drawn full red to be utilised by season holders at all times. On other occasions, some lots are drawn red with continuing white lines to denote season parking after 7:00pm to 7.00am. Before these timing, the lot is available to the public to park as meant by the continuing white lines used in conjunction with the red box lines.

On the upper decks, full white parking lots are available to the public to park. The lower decks are reserved for season parking holders. On Sundays and Public Holidays, some carparks that are away from town centers or shopping malls may have an orange banner displayed at the entrance and within the carpark which permits free parking from 7:30am to 10:30pm.

=== Road signs ===
During British colonial rule, Singapore's road rules and legislature which govern the design and layout of the road signs were directly imported from Britain. As such, most road signs in Singapore are similar to those in the UK. For example, warning signs are depicted as red triangles and mandatory regulative signs are depicted as blue circles.

However, several aspects of road signage and traffic-calming measures adopted locally developed standards after independence. Major deviations are as follows:

1. A locally developed typeface is favoured for the road signs over the Transport typeface which was adopted in Britain.

2. In 1998, a system of black-on-yellow "curve alignment markers" was widely adopted and gradually replaced the British system of using white-on-black sharp deviation signs to delineate sharp turns. A few of the British-system signs were kept such as in Mandai Road and Suntec City.

3. In the late 1990s, all the circular regulatory signs and triangular warning signs were mounted to a one-size-fits-all square white backing board to improve visibility against a complex background like trees.

4. In the early 2000s, signs at road works were made usually black-on-orange and diamond- or rectangular-shaped, similar to the Taiwanese system.

5. Even on larger signs, road names are rarely spelt out in full. For example, "road" is almost always "Rd", "Avenue" as "Ave", "Bukit" as "Bt", "Boulevard" as "Blvd", "Close" as "Cl", "Central" as "Ctrl", "Crescent" as "Cres", "Drive" as "Dr", "Jalan" as "Jln", "Kampong" as "Kg", "Lane" as "Ln", "Lorong" as "Lor", "Upper" as "Upp", "Place" as "Pl", "Saint" and "Street" as "St", "Tanjong" as "Tg". Exceptions include roads that end with less common words, such as "walk", "hill", and "park".

Most roads, bridges, roundabouts, and tunnels are marked with signposts bearing the name of the road. The expressways in Singapore are not numbered (unlike in most other countries), but are named. Road signs abbreviate the full name of the expressway with three representative letters, such as PIE for the Pan Island Expressway or ECP for the East Coast Parkway, respectively.

All road signs in Singapore are displayed in English, except where signs are bilingual. Road names may also have a Malay origin. Typically, "Jalan" is used for "Road" and "Lorong" is used for "Lane". Multilingual road signs exist, especially for historically ethnic enclaves like Chinatown or Little India, or for landmarks. For example, some directional signs pointing to Chinese or Hindu temples are bilingual or trilingual (English, Chinese, or Tamil). Bilingual signage dates to the early days of Singapore.

=== Left turn or right turn at a red traffic light ===
In Singapore, it is illegal to turn left during a red light. This rule, however, does not apply if a "Left Turn on Red" sign is present at the junction, allowing left-turning motorists to turn left, provided they stop before the stop line and give way to pedestrians and incoming traffic, although such intersections have been reducing in number and are now a rarity, owing to road safety concerns.

It is illegal to turn right during a red light in Singapore.

Right turns are permissible only when one's lane has the green light signal or green turning arrow (right after a red light) into the opposing traffic lane, travelling in the opposite direction, is clear and favourable to execute a right turn. However, at some traffic lights of busier intersections, full red-amber-green arrow lamps (the outline of a right-pointing arrow) are installed beside a normal traffic lamp. This is to indicate that only when the green light arrow signal appears that motorists can proceed to make a turn. Otherwise at other times such as during red or amber light arrow signal, or when the coast is clear, motorists cannot make a discretionary right turn.

These rules in Singapore are similar to many countries that employ left-hand traffic, and unlike countries which permit turns on red.

=== Special Roads ===
Due to the limited land space in Singapore, selected roads, especially those with more lanes have been specially designated as runways for aircraft in the event of an emergency or when needs arise.

== Traffic safety ==
=== Driving safety ===
Driving after consuming alcohol, using a phone while driving, dangerous driving, and car racing are all illegal. All offenders will face disqualification and be prosecuted in court.

=== Car safety crash tests ===
The Singapore government accepts the crash safety standards of the EU and Japan. Cars made in the EU and Japan do not need to pass additional safety standards to be sold in Singapore. Cars may be privately imported into Singapore if they have an EU Certificate of Conformity or the Japanese Completion Inspection Certificate, both of which incorporate emissions and safety standards. Not all cars sold in Singapore have been tested by the EuroNCAP, a car-safety testing organisation jointly operated by several European government agencies, that crash tests cars that can be legally sold in several European countries.

== Buying a car ==
Many regulations concerning buying and driving a car are administered by the Land Transport Authority, the successor to the Registry of Vehicles. There are five vehicle taxes and fees for registering a new car.

- Registration Fee (RF)
- Additional Registration Fee (ARF)
- Quota Premium for a Certificate of Entitlement (COE)
- Road Tax
- Excise Duty

=== Registration Fee ===
The registration fee (RF) is a basic fee for registering motor vehicles using Certificates of Entitlement. The amount was varied between types of vehicles before 1 April 1988. On 1 April 1988 and beyond, most motor vehicles have a RF of S$350.

=== Certificate of Entitlement ===
New car buyers are required to buy a Certificate of Entitlement (COE), which is valid for ten years. Thereafter, car owners have to renew the COE at the Prevailing Quota Premium (PQP) at five or ten year premium rate. Extension for two or three years of the typical car lifespan is only for those who have special difficulties.

Car buyers can scrap the car earlier than the typical car lifespan. However, if the car has already reached past 10 years, car owners can only receive the PQP amount of the remaining unused portion. There are provisions for a rebate of the COE if the car is scrapped before 10 years, with the Open Market price of the car playing a significant role.

While the term "bidding" is often used, but in practice new car dealers assist in the process. The fee of each COE is added on to the costs of a new car based on engine size—Category A is 1,600 cc engine and below and engine power output less than 97 kilowatts; Category B is 1,601 cc engine and above—and or the engine power output exceeds 97 kW lower for Category A vehicles.

Other COE categories include for motorcycles, goods vehicles and buses and also the Open Category which Cat A and B can/may utilise.

The number of COEs available to the public is regulated by the Vehicle Quota System (VQS) that is calculated every six months based on three conditions:

1. Actual number of vehicles taken off the roads (i.e. number of vehicles de-registered)
2. Allowable growth in vehicle population
3. Adjustments arising from temporary COEs that have expired or were cancelled.

=== Additional Registration Fee ===
The Additional Registration Fee (ARF) is a tax imposed based on a percentage of the Open Market Value (OMV) of the vehicle. The OMV of a vehicle is determined by Singapore customs and is equivalent to the price of the car, including freight, customs tax and other incidental charges.

A car owner may apply for a portion of the Preferential Additional Registration Fee (PARF) if a car is de-registered before 10 years. The term "Additional Registration Fee (ARF)" is calculated from 110% of Open Market Value (OMV). If a car is less than 5 years old, then the PARF is 75% of the ARF.

== Licence plates ==
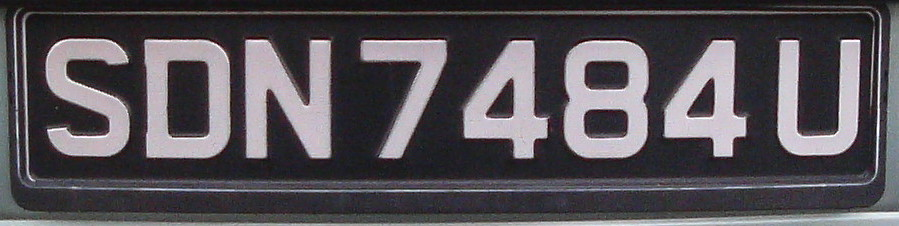
Licence plate

Vehicle licence plates in Singapore are the same 520 mm × 110 mm size found in many European countries. Red licence plates indicate that the car may be driven only during off-peak times unless a daily fee is paid. Off-peak times are from 7 p.m. to 7 a.m. on weekdays and all day on Saturdays and Sundays. Since the end of January 2010, off-peak car usage is no longer restricted on Saturday, Sunday, and the days before public holidays.

Off-peak licence plates bear a red reflective background on white font with a tamper proof seal. Standard licence plates in Singapore from local dealerships are black with silver or white lettering.

The European white front/yellow rear plate combination is also accepted, if the white and yellow plate bears a reflective background.

== Car market ==
=== Domestic car market ===
Car brands are typically sold by only one dealer although there are rare exceptions where two dealers sell the same brand. Several dealers have more than one location, with various servicing centres across the island or situated in petrol stations. Some dealers sell more than one brand, unlike the situation in some western European countries in the past where some manufacturers prohibited dealers from selling competing brands.

The limited size of the Singapore market results in most brands not offering the full model line in Singapore. Unlike in Australia, where the US Honda Accord and the Japanese Honda Accord (re-badged as the Acura TSX in the United States) are sold, only the Japanese Honda Accord is sold in Singapore. Some brands, such as Saab and Volvo (except the Volvo S60R) are only offered with automatic transmission even though manual transmission cars are sold in the car's home market.

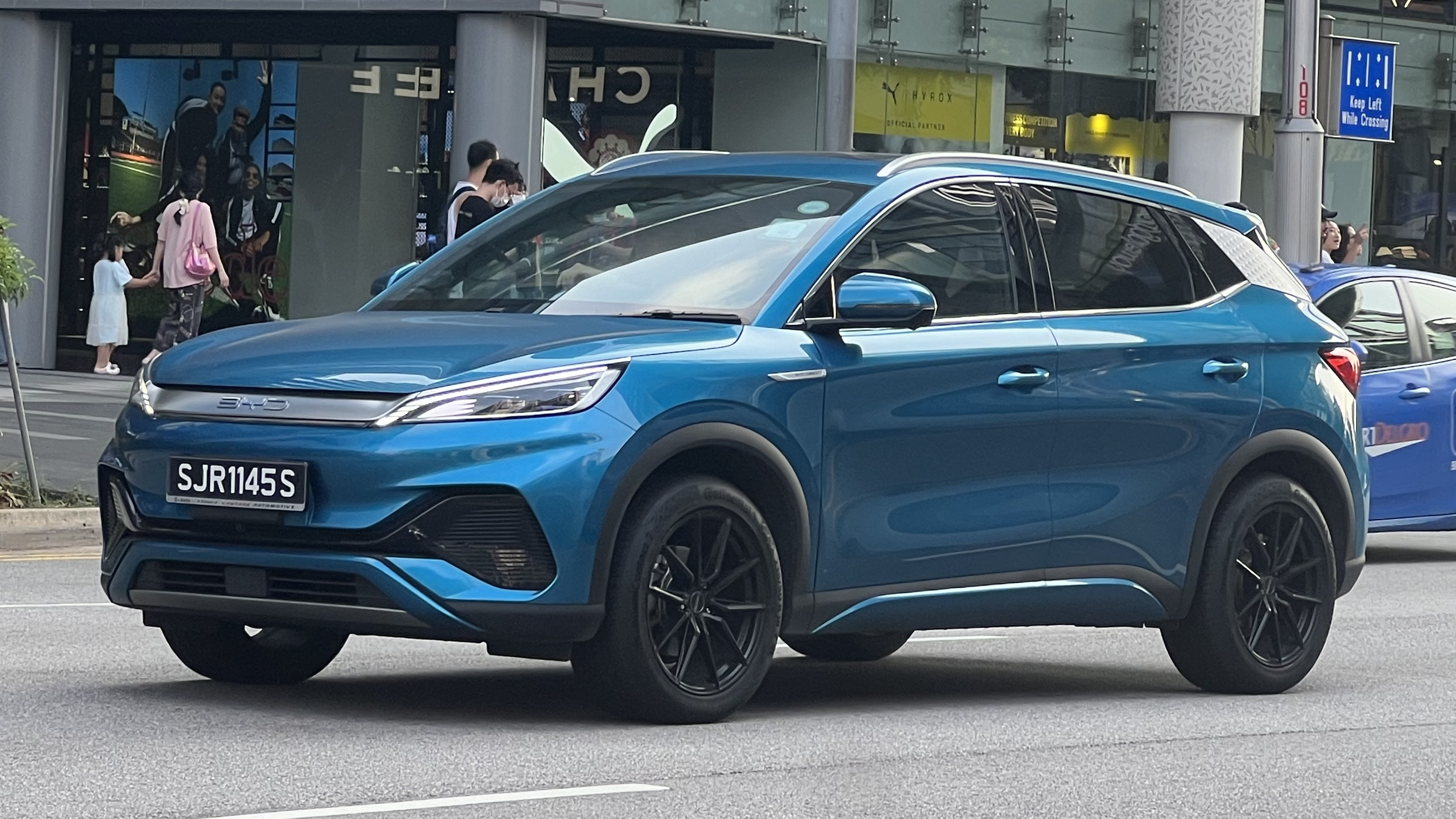
BYD Atto 3

Sport utility vehicles (SUVs) are growing in popularity in Singapore as in the United States and Canada. Notably, passenger pick-up trucks in Singapore are relatively expensive compared to other Southeast Asian countries, and some dealerships do not import pick-up trucks like the Volkswagen Amarok and Thai-built Ford Ranger at all.

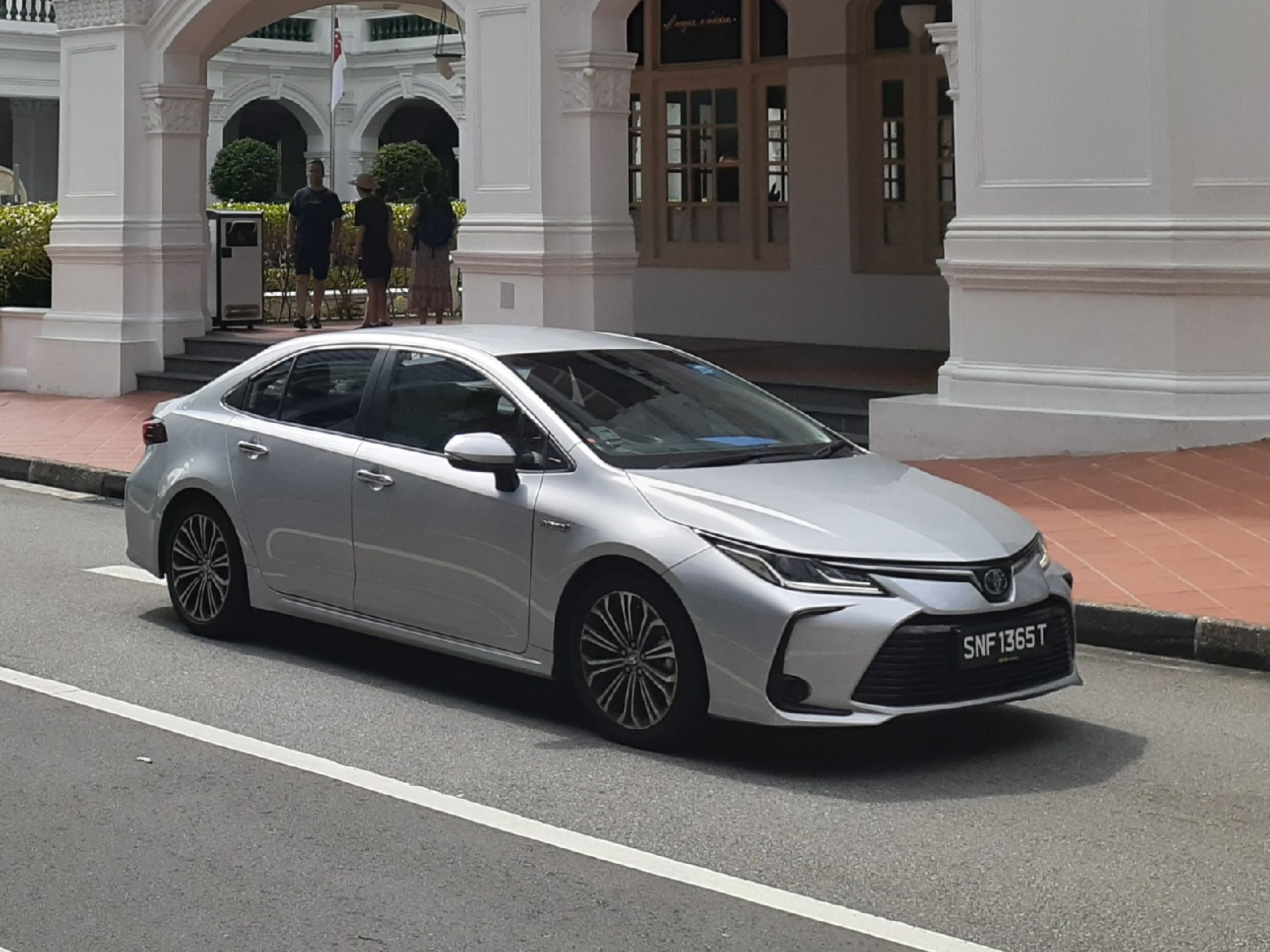
Toyota Corolla Altis Hybrid

Japanese car manufacturers have the largest market share. Some Japanese cars are imported from countries other than Japan. For example, the Toyota Vios is imported from Thailand, whereas the JDM version is called Toyota Belta. Initially, the ninth generation Toyota Corolla sold in Singapore was a Japanese model, while the facelift version is a wider and longer Corolla Altis from Thailand.

Kei cars (like the Mitsubishi i, Subaru R2, and Suzuki Carry) are less common in Singapore, and are now limited towards the Japanese domestic market. Besides this, there are some grey imports of Kei cars like Daihatsu Copen.

European car manufacturers are well represented. On the more expensive segment of the market, European cars sold in Singapore include Aston Martin, Alfa Romeo, Mercedes, BMW, and others. Skoda, Fiat, Renault, Peugeot and Citroen are among the less expensive European cars sold in Singapore.

American cars have a lower market share. Chrysler, Tesla, and Jeep vehicles are sold in Singapore, such as the Chrysler 300C, Tesla Model X, Dodge Caliber, and Jeep Wrangler. Chevrolet markets only Korean-made Daewoo cars, but not its American-made models. Ford markets some cars from its European line, not its American product line. Even Subaru, a Japanese carmaker, did not do well with cars made by a US-based subsidiary, Subaru of Indiana Automotive, which exported the US-made Tribeca to Singapore.

Other Asian car brands sold in Singapore include Perodua, Proton, Ssangyong, Chery, Kia, Hyundai and BYD.

Used cars that are more than three years old cannot be imported into Singapore.

=== Aftermarket ===
Because Singapore does not have a domestic automobile industry and thus has a very small domestic market for remanufactured and reconditioned auto parts, it has become an especially important aftermarket for businesses exporting automotive parts and accessories. This is magnified by high automobile turnover, a preference for new parts, and high demand for "accessories, car-care products, prestige items, and new spare parts". In fact, Singapore has become a major automotive components manufacturing base, as several leading multinational corporations (MNCs) have established international procurement offices as well as their Southeast Asia distribution centres.

=== Singapore as an automobile exporter ===
The peculiarities of Singapore's car market has made Singapore the second largest exporter of used cars in the world (approximately 100,000 cars exported per year) after Japan. Singapore exports its cars to many countries, including African countries. Used cars are often exported to other countries with right-hand driving, but there are exports to left-hand-driving countries as well. New Zealand allows used cars previously registered in Singapore to be imported without any modifications.

This is due in part to the reduction in the costs of COE and PARF between 2000 and 2005, which has incentivised owners to purchase new cars before their ten years are up. Previously, the COE and PARF represented around 80% of the cost of a medium-priced car like the Honda Accord. With the COE and PARF less expensive than in the past, in some cases the yearly drop in the COE and PARF rebate becomes significant compared to the pre-tax (OMV) price of a new car. Furthermore, with the PARF rebate starting to diminish after a car is five years old, the net amount of credit (similar to resale value or trade-in value) compared to the OMV becomes less favourable for owners of older cars. In contrast, in countries with low taxes, the most economical ownership strategy is to keep a car as long as possible until repair costs exceed a new car's depreciation costs or financing costs.

== Right-hand drive vehicles ==
In Singapore, only right-hand-drive cars are permitted on the roads. There are exceptions for special-purpose vehicles, diplomatic vehicles, and foreign-registered vehicles, with the label placed at the back windscreen of the vehicles indicating "Left Hand Drive" to alert other motorists that the driver's seat is on the left side instead of on the right side.

== Retail petrol market ==
In 2017, there were about 170 petrol stations across the city-state, a decrease from 222 stations in 2013. Many were closed as they were either deemed a security risk or the license had lapsed. These stations operate under brands of five multinational companies, with no independent retailers. The petrol station network is largely operated by four incumbent retailers: Shell, ExxonMobil, retailing petrol under the brand Esso, Chevron, retailing petrol under the brand Caltex, and Singapore Petroleum Company, retailing petrol under the brand SPC. The incumbent retailers are vertically integrated, with their supplies of refined petrol coming from their refineries situated at Jurong Island. Potential new entrants to the market face high barriers to entry in form of additional premiums paid to acquire retail petrol sites that are planned for by Urban Redevelopment Authority (URA) and tendered out by Housing and Development Board (HDB). It was also determined that for a viable retail petrol operation in Singapore, a new entrant would need to operate minimally 30 sites, which is hard to achieve at the average rate of 2.4 new tenders per annum. In 2017, Sinopec won the bids for two retail sites, with the first site coming into operation in November 2018.

Four grades of petrol are commonly sold in Singapore. Diesel and unleaded petrol with octane levels of 92, 95 and 98 are widely sold. Octane levels conform with European octane ratings and roughly correspond to American octane levels of 87, 90, and 93, respectively. Shell also market a fifth brand of fuel under the V-Power label, in addition to 98 octane petrol. 98 octane V-Power is marketed as having an FMT additive and "formulated to improve performance and responsiveness".

It was reported that the retailers enjoy a high level of brand loyalty among customers due to convenience of station locations, credit/debit card promotions, brand loyalty programmes, and low prices among other factors.

As the retailers base their pricing strategy for retail petrol around the price at which petrol retailers purchase the refined wholesale petrol from the refineries, or also known as Mean of Platts Singapore (MOPS) prices, retailers have similar pricing to each other. However, it is observed that the changes in retail pricing across retailer happen at different times, with "no observable pricing pattern, such as a clear price leader, either for price increases or price decreases". Where there was convergence in the pricing, it is due to petrol retailers monitoring each other's published retail petrol prices and then reacted with changes in prices or introducing promotions to retain customers or to win new customers. With the additional application of discounts and rebates afforded through credit/debit cards promotions and brand loyalty scheme, consumers are able to enjoy a differentiation of petrol prices in the market. However, such schemes are complicated and make direct price comparison difficult.

Petrol is cheaper in Malaysia than in Singapore, but arbitrage opportunities are limited because cars registered in Singapore crossing over into Malaysia are legally required to have at least three-quarters of a tank of fuel.

== Foreign assessment of Singapore motoring ==
The Deutsche Gesellschaft für Technische Zusammenarbeit (GTZ) submitted a report on Singapore's Electronic Road Pricing (ERP) system to the World Bank. The report praised ERP as fair, convenient, reliable, and effective in congestion reduction. It also described its positive ramifications such as revenue collection and pollution control.

An expatriate advice website states that driving and owning a car in Singapore is very expensive.

Wired described Singapore as a "living laboratory for Intelligent Transport Systems, a catchall phrase for high-tech strategies to gather data, manage flow, and inform drivers of congestion ahead", noting that traffic "does indeed move noticeably smoother here than in American metropolitan areas of comparable size—Atlanta, for instance."

== Measures to reduce vehicle usage ==
Several steps have to be completed before a car-owner can drive a vehicle in Singapore. A Certificate of Entitlement (COE) is required to subsequently register a car, registration date and other car log information to it. The cost of an COE in S$ is varied, depending on the market rate and pool of quota application for a bidding. It may cost more than the basic cost of a car to successful bidders.

Over the years, further measures were introduced to curb car growth, such as implementing zero growth rate towards cars and motorcycles since February 2018. This meant that the COE quota will be kept in check, and the next COE quota quarter is now dependent on the number of vehicle de-registrations of the preceding quarter/year. This was further extended to until January 31, 2025 upon further study by the authorities.

A COE permits ownership of the vehicle for a period of 10 years, after which the vehicle must be scrapped or another COE paid for allowing an additional 5 or 10 years of usage. Only ten-year COEs may be further renewed to another 5 or 10 years and no extension of the car is given. Otherwise, buyers of five-year COEs are only allowed to utilise their COE extension for a period of 5 years, after which it will be invalid along with its road tax. Historic vehicles are exempted from these requirements, as they are able to register for a Classic Car Scheme which permits them to drive on the road for 45 days a year with proper sticker labels displayed on the windscreen.

Certain roads and expressways in Singapore are also subject to the Electronic Road Pricing (ERP) system, that is operational during morning and evening peak hour periods.

Both the COE and the ERP system are intended to encourage people to use public transport such as the MRT and public buses instead of driving. The increasing parking charges in HDB carparks from 1 December 2016 in electronic parking and selected season parking also deter people from driving and encouraged to take public transport.

== See also ==
- List of countries by vehicles per capita
