= Assignor estoppel =

The doctrine of assignor estoppel is a doctrine of United States patent law barring a patent's seller (assignor) from attacking the patent's validity in subsequent patent infringement litigation. The doctrine is based on the doctrine of legal estoppel, which prohibits a grantor (typically, of real property) from challenging the validity of his/her/its grant.

In Diamond Scientific Co. v. Ambico, Inc., the United States Court of Appeals for the Federal Circuit distinguished the policies applicable to assignor estoppel from those applicable to licensee estoppel. It therefore held that the doctrine of Lear, Inc. v. Adkins, which applies to licenses and holds that public policy requires that licensees not be muzzled from challenging the validity of possibly spurious patents, does not apply to assignments.

The UK counterpart to this doctrine is the doctrine of non-derogation from grants. Under this doctrine, as explained in British Leyland Motor Corp. v. Armstrong Patents Co., a seller of realty or goods is not permitted to take any action (such as bringing an infringement action) that will lessen the value to the buyer of the thing sold. Thus, the owner of copyright in the tailpipe of a motor car, having sold the motor car, may not then bring a copyright infringement action to prevent the aftermarket sale of replacement tailpipes to purchasers of those motor cars. The application of the UK doctrine outside real estate law has been limited subsequently to Leyland, however, to consumer protection contexts.

== Examples ==
- For example, if Tom sold his U.S. patent rights to Jerry, and was sued by Jerry over infringement of that patent later, Tom is not allowed to challenge the patent's validity because he was the inventor.

"Doctrine of assignor estoppel prevents unfairness and injustice of permitting party to sell patent rights and later assert that what he sold is worthless."

- This doctrine extends to those in "privity" with the assignor. If Tom becomes another company's largest shareholder, and that company is sued by Jerry over patent infringement, that company could very likely be barred from raising patent validity as a defense even if Tom was not personally involved in the infringing process.

== Case law ==
- Westinghouse Elec. & Mfg. Co. v. Formica Insulation Co., 266 U.S. 342, 45 S.Ct. 117 (1924).
- Diamond Scientific Co. v. Ambico, Inc., 848 F.2d 1220 (Fed. Cir. 1988), in some circumstances, equity may outweigh the estoppel doctrine.
- Mentor Graphics Corp. v. Quickturn Design Sys., Inc., 150 F.3d 1374, 1377-79 (Fed. Cir. 1998) ("Without exceptional circumstances...one who assigns a patent surrenders with that assignment the right to later challenge the validity of the assigned patent").
- Shamrock Technologies, Inc. v. Med. Sterilization, Inc., 903 F.2d 789, 793 (Fed. Cir. 1990) (Holding that assignor estoppel extends to parties in privity with the assignor).
- Minerva Surgical, Inc. v. Hologic, Inc. 594. U.S. ___ (2021) re-affirms the principle of assignor estoppel as long as the assignor contradicts "explicit or implicit representations he made in assigning the patent."

== See also ==
- Inventor (patent)
- Licensee estoppel
