= De facto corporation and corporation by estoppel =

De facto corporation and corporation by estoppel are both terms that are used by courts in most common law jurisdictions to describe circumstances in which a business organization that has failed to become a de jure corporation (a corporation by law) will nonetheless be treated as a corporation, thereby shielding shareholders from liability.

== De facto corporation ==
In order for a de facto corporation to be created, the following elements must exist:

1. There must be an incorporation statute that lays out the various requirements under which legal incorporation can be accomplished;
2. There must have been a good faith attempt to comply with the statute by the intended incorporators (for example, if the articles of incorporation were mailed to the appropriate office, but addressed to the wrong person, lost in the mail, or not filed by the corporation by the time the corporation began acting in an official capacity);
3. There must have been an act made on the corporation's behalf by its purported officers or agents.

If all of these requirements are met, then the business will be treated as a corporation for all purposes, except with respect to acts by the state itself. However, most states will not apply this doctrine to protect a person who was aware that the incorporation effort was defective at the time that they purported to act on behalf of the corporation.

== Corporation by estoppel ==
Corporation by estoppel, on the other hand, applies when someone operates a business as if it were a limited liability entity or corporation, irrespective of whether there was a good faith effort by the business to incorporate. The person doing business with such an entity, as if it were a limited liability entity or corporation, may later be estopped from arguing that it is not in fact a limited liability entity, in an attempt to reach the assets of the incorporators. For the same reason, defendants who had acted as a corporation will be estopped from denying liability as a corporation when sued by a plaintiff who had relied on the defendant's corporate form when dealing with the defendant.
