= List of United States Supreme Court cases, volume 377 =

This is a list of all the United States Supreme Court cases from volume 377 of the United States Reports:

Case name	Citation	Date decided
Trainmen v. Virginia ex rel. Va. State Bar	377 U.S. 1	1964
An injunction, prohibiting, as the unlawful solicitation of litigation and the unauthorized practice of law, a labor union from advising injured members or their dependents to obtain legal assistance before settling claims and recommending specific lawyers to handle such claims, infringes rights guaranteed by the First and Fourteenth Amendments.
Simpson v. Union Oil Co.	377 U.S. 13	1964
Resale price maintenance through a coercive type of consignment agreement where the lessor of gasoline refuses to renew the agreement if the salesperson sells below that fixed price violates the antitrust laws, causing the salesperson to suffer an actionable wrong or damage.
FPC v. Texaco Inc.	377 U.S. 33	1964
The term "is located" in §19(b) of the Natural Gas Act means more than having physical presence in a place, and, in the case of a corporation, it refers to the state in which the corporation is incorporated.
NLRB v. Servette, Inc.	377 U.S. 46	1964
It is not an unfair labor practice for a union to request supermarket managers not to handle products of the distributor against whom the union is striking. Though store managers come within the term "individual" in § 8(b)(4)(i) of the National Labor Relations Act, that provision is inapplicable when the managers are requested to make decisions within their managerial authority, rather than to cease performing duties to force their employers to stop dealing with the distributor.
NLRB v. Fruit Packers	377 U.S. 58	1964
Peaceful secondary picketing of retail stores directed solely at appealing to consumers to refrain from buying the primary employer's product is not prohibited by § 8(b)(4) of the National Labor Relations Act.
United States v. Welden	377 U.S. 95	1964
378 Realty Corp. v. NYC Rent & Rehabilitation Admin.	377 U.S. 124	1964
Vokes v. City of Chicago	377 U.S. 124	1964
Sanders v. Alabama	377 U.S. 125	1964
Hattiesburg Bldg. & Trades Council v. Broome	377 U.S. 126	1964
Cickelli v. Ohio	377 U.S. 128	1964
Mitchell v. La. Bd. of Optometry Exam'rs	377 U.S. 128	1964
Coleman v. Alabama	377 U.S. 129	1964
Mo. Pac. R.R. Co. v. Elmore & Stahl	377 U.S. 134	1964
Mercer v. Theriot	377 U.S. 152	1964
Clinton v. Virginia	377 U.S. 158	1964
Willis Shaw Frozen Express, Inc. v. United States	377 U.S. 159	1964
United States v. Cont'l Oil Co.	377 U.S. 161	1964
Bontz v. Kansas	377 U.S. 162	1964
Schneider v. Rusk	377 U.S. 163	1964
Clay v. Sun Ins. Office, Ltd.	377 U.S. 179	1964
Parden v. Terminal R.R. Co.	377 U.S. 184	1964
Massiah v. United States	377 U.S. 201	1964
Marks v. Esperdy	377 U.S. 214	1964
Luckenbach S.S. Co. v. Franchise Tax Bd.	377 U.S. 215	1964
Sinclair v. Baker	377 U.S. 215	1964
Swan v. Nation Co.	377 U.S. 216	1964
Hunter v. Illinois	377 U.S. 216	1964
Highway Express Lines, Inc. v. Jones Motor Co.	377 U.S. 217	1964
Griffin v. County School Board of Prince Edward County	377 U.S. 218	1964
E. Gas & Fuel Assocs. v. United States	377 U.S. 235	1964
Teamsters v. Morton	377 U.S. 252	1964
Calhoun v. Latimer	377 U.S. 263	1964
Nagelberg v. United States	377 U.S. 266	1964
Rogers v. City of Pine Bluff	377 U.S. 268	1964
Horner v. Florida	377 U.S. 268	1964
Raymond v. Wickham	377 U.S. 269	1964
Ahlstrand v. United States	377 U.S. 269	1964
Lynchburg Traffic Bureau v. United States	377 U.S. 270	1964
United States v. Aluminum Co.	377 U.S. 271	1964
NAACP v. Alabama ex rel. Flowers	377 U.S. 288	1964
Red Ball Motor Freight, Inc. v. Shannon	377 U.S. 311	1964
Hostetter v. Idlewild Bon Voyage Liquor Corp.	377 U.S. 324	1964
Dept. of Revenue v. James B. Beam Distilling Co.	377 U.S. 341	1964
United States v. Vermont	377 U.S. 351	1964
Baggett v. Bullitt	377 U.S. 360	1964
Hudson Distributors, Inc. v. Eli Lilly & Co.	377 U.S. 386	1964
Chamberlin v. Bd. of Pub. Instruction	377 U.S. 402	1964
Union Oil Co. v. State Bd. of Equalization	377 U.S. 404	1964
Williams v. United States	377 U.S. 404	1964
Meeks v. Ga. S. & F.R.R. Co.	377 U.S. 405	1964
Zapata v. California	377 U.S. 406	1964
Marder v. Massachusetts	377 U.S. 407	1964
Donovan v. Dallas	377 U.S. 408	1964
Wilbur-Ellis Co. v. Kuther	377 U.S. 422	1964
J.I. Case Co. v. Borak	377 U.S. 426	1964
Gen. Motors Corp. v. Washington	377 U.S. 436	1964
United States v. Tateo	377 U.S. 463	1964
Aro Mfg. Co. v. Convertible Top Replacement Co.	377 U.S. 476	1964
Tacoma Ass'n v. Washington	377 U.S. 532	1964
Reynolds v. Sims	377 U.S. 533	1964
WMCA v. Lomenzo	377 U.S. 633	1964
Md. Comm. for Fair Rep. v. Tawes	377 U.S. 656	1964
Davis v. Mann	377 U.S. 678	1964
Roman v. Sincock	377 U.S. 695	1964
Lucas v. Forty-Fourth Gen. Assembly	377 U.S. 713	1964
