= LB (Plastics) Ltd v Swish Products Ltd =

LB (Plastics) Ltd v Swish Products Ltd is a 1979 decision of the House of Lords as to whether a physical object is an infringing copy of a drawing depicting the object. The House of Lords held that it is, at least when an ordinary person could recognize that physical object was that which the drawing depicted.

The House of Lords later reaffirmed the principle stated in this case in British Leyland Motor Corp v Armstrong Patents Co, saying that it must be regarded as "settled law". The Judicial Committee of the Privy Council in Canon Kabushiki Kaisha v Green Cartridge Co (Hong Kong) Ltd again reaffirmed the principle.

However, section 51 of the later enacted Copyright, Designs and Patents Act 1988 reduced the applicability of this rule, in that it is only infringement of copyright or design right in design drawings where the design is of an artistic work or a typeface.

The position under United States federal copyright law is diametrically opposite.

== See also ==
- Copyright law of the United Kingdom
