= Doctrine of non-derogation from grants =

Legal doctrine in England and Wales

The doctrine of non-derogation from grants is a principle of the law of England and Wales. As the House of Lords explained in British Leyland Motor Corp v Armstrong Patents Co, it states that a seller of realty or goods is not permitted to take any action (such as bringing an infringement action) that will lessen the value to the buyer of the thing sold.

United States federal law recognises similar doctrines such as the exhaustion doctrine or doctrine of implied license. A similar effect has also been realised in United States patent law under the doctrine of repair and reconstruction.

An important difference between the doctrine of non-derogation from grants and other doctrines, particularly implied license, that are used to accomplish similar results is that the doctrine of non-derogation from grants is "inherent" as a matter of property law and apparently cannot be avoided by a seller's use of language attempting to negative application of the doctrine or by trial counsel's pointing to evidence of intent not to relinquish patent rights or copyright. In contrast, the other doctrines may be vulnerable to contractual disclaimers or evidence of intent not to grant intellectual property rights. The issue is discussed to some extent in the courts' opinions in British Leyland and Quanta Computer, Inc. v. LG Electronics, Inc.

== See also ==
- Estoppel by deed
- Legal estoppel
