= Lear, Inc. v. Adkins =

- Supreme Court of the United States

Argued November 20–21, 1968 Decided June 16, 1969
- Full case name: Lear, Incorporated v. John Adkins
- Citations: 395 U.S. 653 (more) 89 S. Ct. 1902; 23 L. Ed. 2d 610; 162 U.S.P.Q. (BNA) 1; 1969 Trade Cas. (CCH) ¶ 72,823

Case history
- Prior: Adkins v. Lear, Inc., 143 U.S.P.Q. 53 (Cal. Super. Ct. 1964); affirmed, 52 Cal.Rptr. 795 (Dist. App. 2d Dist. 1966); reversed, 67 Cal.2d 882, 64 Cal.Rptr. 545, 435 P.2d 321 (1967); cert. granted, 391 U.S. 912 (1968).

Court membership
- Chief Justice Earl Warren Associate Justices Hugo Black · William O. Douglas; John M. Harlan II · William J. Brennan Jr. Potter Stewart · Byron White; Thurgood Marshall

Case opinions
- Majority: Harlan, joined by Warren, Brennan, Stewart, Marshall
- Concur/dissent: Black (in part), joined by Warren, Douglas
- Concur/dissent: White (in part)

Lear, Inc. v. Adkins, 395 U.S. 653 (1969), is a decision of the U.S. Supreme Court overturning the doctrine of licensee estoppel and holding that public interest considerations require that licensees be free to challenge the validity of possibly spurious patents under which they are licensed. This entailed the overruling of Automatic Radio Mfg. Co. v. Hazeltine Research, Inc. and prior cases that it had reaffirmed.

== Opinion of the Court ==
The Supreme Court recognized that a conflict existed between the demands of contract law, which “forbids a purchaser to repudiate his promises simply because he later becomes dissatisfied with the bargain," and federal policy, which “requires that all ideas in general circulation be dedicated to the common good unless they are protected by a valid patent.” Past efforts at compromise to reconcile these competing interests led to “a chaos of conflicting case law.” The Court found guidance in a 19th-century decision stating that “[i]t is as important to the public that competition should not be repressed by worthless patents as that the patentee of a really valuable invention should be protected in his monopoly.” It concluded that the equities of the licensor under contract law were outbalanced by “the important public interest in permitting full and free competition in the use of ideas which are in reality a part of the public domain.” It explained:

Licensees may often be the only individuals with enough economic incentive to challenge the patentability of an inventor's discovery. If they are muzzled, the public may continually be required to pay tribute to would-be monopolists without need or justification.

Based on “the strong federal policy favoring the full and free use of ideas in the public domain,” the Court therefore held that the licensee Lear must be permitted not to pay patent royalties to Adkins if it could prove that the patent for a gyroscope was invalid.
