= Estoppel =

Preventive judicial device in common law

Estoppel is a judicial device whereby a court may prevent or "estop" a person from making assertions or from going back on their word. The person barred from doing so is said to be "estopped". Estoppel may prevent someone from bringing a particular claim. In common law legal systems, the legal doctrine of estoppel is based in both common law and equity.

Promissory and proprietary estoppel are specific forms of estoppel reflecting distinct legal traditions within various jurisdictions. Estoppel is also a concept in international law.

== Types of estoppel ==
There are many different types of estoppel, but the common thread between them is that a person is restrained from asserting a particular position in law where it would be inequitable to do so. By way of illustration:

- If a landlord promises a tenant that he will not exercise his right to terminate a lease, and relying upon that promise the tenant spends money improving the premises, the doctrine of promissory estoppel may prevent the landlord from exercising a right to terminate, even though his promise might not otherwise have been legally binding as a contract. The landlord is precluded from asserting a specific right.
- If a person brings legal proceedings in one country claiming that he was injured by a second person negligently, and the courts of that country determine that there was no negligence, then under the doctrine of issue estoppel the first person cannot normally argue before the courts of another country that the second person was negligent (whether in respect of the same claim or a related claim). The first person is precluded from asserting a specific claim.

Estoppel is traditionally an equitable doctrine. Accordingly, it is sometimes said that any person wishing to assert an estoppel must come to the court with "clean hands".

The doctrine of estoppel (which may prevent a party from asserting a right) is often confused with the doctrine of waiver (which relates to relinquishing a right once it has arisen). It also substantially overlaps with, but is distinct from, the equitable doctrine of laches.

== Etymology and usage ==
"Estop" is a verb of Anglo-Norman origin meaning "to seal up", while the noun "estoppel" is based on Old French estoupail (stopper). When a court finds that a party has done something warranting a form of estoppel, that party is said to be estopped from making certain related arguments or claiming certain related rights. The defendant is estopped from presenting the related defense, or the plaintiff is estopped from making the related argument against the defendant. Lord Coke stated, "It is called an estoppel or conclusion, because a man's own act or acceptance stoppeth or closeth up his mouth to allege or plead the truth."

== Overview ==
Estoppel is sometimes said to be a rule of evidence whereby a person is barred from leading evidence of a fact that has already been settled or they are otherwise precluded from asserting, but that may be an oversimplification. Firstly, although some estoppels relate to preventing a party from asserting facts, others relate to preventing a party from asserting a right or a claim. Secondly, under the conflict of laws in common law jurisdictions, matters of evidence are usually treated as procedural matters for the law of the local court (the lex fori), whereas it is generally accepted that an estoppel may affect substantive rights and are therefore matters to be determined by the proper law (or lex causae) that governs the particular issue.

There are many different types of estoppel that can arise under common law legal systems. It has been judicially noted on more than one occasion that the link between them is often somewhat tenuous. Treitel on Contracts notes that "unconscionability ... provides the link between them", but they nevertheless have "separate requirements and different terrains of application". The courts have long abandoned an attempt to create a single general underlying rationale or principle:

the attempt ... to demonstrate that all estoppels ... are now subsumed in the single and all-embracing estoppel by representation and that they are all governed by the same principle [has] never won general acceptance.

— Lord Millett

The plea of estoppel is often closely connected with the plea of waiver, the object of both being to ensure bona fides in day-to-day transactions. It is also related to the doctrines of variation and election. It is applied in many areas of contract law, including insurance, banking, and employment. In English law, the concept of legitimate expectation in the realm of administrative law and judicial review is estoppel's counterpart in public law.

Promissory estoppel is often applied where there is a promise or an agreement made without consideration. When used as a defense by a defendant it is sometimes called a "shield", and when used affirmatively by a plaintiff it is sometimes called a "sword". It is most commonly used as a shield, with some commentators stating that it can only be used as a shield, although this varies with jurisdictions.

=== Examples ===
Estoppel can be understood by considering examples such as the following:

1. A city entered into a contract with another party. The contract stated that it had been reviewed by the city's legal counsel and that the contract was proper. Estoppel applied to estop the city from claiming the contract was invalid.
2. A creditor unofficially informs a debtor that the creditor forgives the debt between them. Even if such forgiveness is not formally documented, the creditor may be estopped from changing its mind and seeking to collect the debt, because that change would be unfair.
3. A landlord informs a tenant that rent has been reduced, for example, because there was construction or a lapse in utility services. If the tenant relies on this statement in choosing to remain in the premises, the landlord could be estopped from collecting the full rent.

=== Types ===
Some types of estoppel under English, Australian, and American laws are as follows:

==== In civil cases ====
- Reliance-based estoppels: These involve one party relying on something the other party has done or said. The party who performed/spoke is the one who is estopped. This category is discussed below.
- Estoppel by record: This frequently arises as issue/cause of action estoppel or judicial estoppel where the orders or judgments made in previous legal proceedings prevent the parties from relitigating the same issues or causes of action.
- Estoppel by deed: Situations where rules of evidence prevent a litigant from denying the truth of what was said or done.
- Estoppel by silence or acquiescence: Estoppel that prevents a person from asserting something when he had the right and opportunity to do so earlier, and such silence put another person at a disadvantage.
- Laches: Estoppel after a litigant deliberately and avoidably delays an action so as to disadvantage an adversary.

==== In American criminal cases ====
- Entrapment by estoppel: In American criminal law, although "ignorance of the law is no excuse" is a principle which generally holds for traditional (older common law) crimes, courts sometimes allow this excuse as a defense, when defendant can show they reasonably relied on an interpretation of the law by the public official(s) charged with enforcement or interpretation of that law, such as a regulatory official (even if that official's interpretation is later determined to be wrong). The defense is based on "fairness" principles in the Fifth Amendment. It generally involves determination of fact, not of law, except as to determination of whether the interpreting government official had the legal status asserted by the defense.

=== In patent law ===
Estoppel is relevant and applied in U.S. patent law.

Acceptance of background documents by the patent office into a granted patent effectively gives rise to estoppel on any opposition based on the same documents. In effect, when the background section lists a document, it cannot be used to dispute the novelty of the patent. This is because the acceptance of the background by the patent office implies that the matter presented is already considered to be within the "state of the art" at the time when the patent is granted, and still distinct from the patent claim. For the patent applicant, sufficient inclusion of relevant prior art therefore protects the patent from dispute.

There are many types of estoppel applied in patent law, such as collateral estoppel; prosecution history estoppel (as in the landmark case Festo Corp. v. Shoketsu Kinzoku Kogyo Kabushiki Co.(2002)); and § 315(e) estoppel, which estops the petitioner from re-applying the same grounds in court that they already applied in an inter partes review.

== Reliance-based estoppels ==
Reliance-based estoppels (at English law) include:

- by representation of fact, where one person asserts the truth of a set of facts to another;
- promissory estoppel, where one person makes a promise to another, but there is no enforceable contract; and
- proprietary estoppel, where the parties are litigating the title to land.

Both Halsbury's and Spencer Bower (see below) describe these three estoppels collectively as estoppels by representation. More simply, one party must say or do something and see the other party rely on what is said or done to change behavior.

All reliance-based estoppels require the victimised party to show both inducement and detrimental reliance, i.e.:

- there must be evidence to show that the representor actually intended the victim to act on the representation or promise, or
- the victim must satisfy the court that it was reasonable for him or her to act on the relevant representation or promise, and
- what the victim did must either have been reasonable, or
- the victim did what the representor intended, and
- the victim would suffer a loss or detriment if the representor was allowed to deny what was said or done—detriment is measured at the time when the representor proposes to deny the representation or withdraw the promise, not at the time when either was made, and
- in all the circumstances, the behavior of the representor is such that it would be "unconscionable" to allow him or her to resile.

Simply put, promissory estoppel has four necessary elements which the plaintiff must prove:

- there was a promise
- that was reasonably relied upon
- resulting in legal detriment to the promisee
- justice requires enforcement of the promise

Estoppel by representation of fact and promissory estoppel are mutually exclusive: the former is based on a representation of existing fact (or of mixed fact and law), while the latter is based on a promise not to enforce some pre-existing right (i.e. it expresses an intention as to the future). A promissory estoppel operates only between parties who, at the time of the representation, were in an existing relationship, while this is not a requirement for estoppel by representation of fact.

The test for unconscionability in the English and Australian courts takes many factors into account, including the behavior, state of mind and circumstances of the parties. Generally, the following eight factors are determinative:

- how the promise/representation and reliance upon it were induced;
- the content of the promise/representation;
- the relative knowledge of the parties;
- the parties' relative interest in the relevant activities in reliance;
- the nature and context of the parties' relationship;
- the parties' relative strength of position;
- the history of the parties' relationship; and
- the steps, if any, taken by the promisor/representor to ensure he has not caused preventable harm.

But in Cobbe v Yeoman's Row, Lord Scott of Foscote stated the following:

the ingredients for a proprietary estoppel should include, in principle, a proprietary claim made by a claimant and an answer to that claim based on some fact, or point of mixed fact and law, which the person against whom the claim was made could be estopped from asserting. To treat a "proprietary estoppel equity" as requiring simply unconscionable behaviour was a recipe for confusion. The remedy to which, on the facts as found by the judge, the claimant was entitled could be described neither as based on an estoppel nor as proprietary in character. His Lordship's present view was that proprietary estoppel could not be prayed in aid to render enforceable an agreement declared by statute (s. 2 of the Law Reform (Miscellaneous Provisions) Act 1989) to be void. A claim for the imposition of a constructive trust to provide a remedy for a disappointed expectation engendered by a representation made in the course of incomplete contractual negotiations was misconceived and could not be sustained by reliance on unconscionable behaviour. The claimant was, however, entitled to a quantum meruit payment for his services in obtaining the planning permission.

=== England and Wales ===
==== Estoppel by representation of fact ====
In English law, estoppel by representation of fact is a term coined by Spencer Bower. This species of estoppel is also referred to as "common law estoppel by representation" in Halsbury's Laws of England, vol 16(2), 2003 reissue.

Spencer Bower defines estoppel by representation of fact as follows:

Where one person ('the representor') has made a representation of fact to another person ('the representee') in words or by acts or conduct, or (being under a duty to the representee to speak or act) by silence or inaction, with the intention (actual or presumptive) and with the result of inducing the representee on the faith of such representation to alter his position to his detriment, the representor, in any litigation which may afterwards take place between him and the representee, is estopped, as against the representee, from making, or attempting to establish by evidence, any averment substantially at variance with his former representation, if the representee at the proper time, and in proper manner, objects thereto.

A second definition comes from Sean Wilken and Theresa Villiers:

An estoppel by representation [of fact] will arise between A and B if the following elements are made out. First, A makes a false representation of fact to B or to a group of which B was a member. [It is not necessary to demonstrate A knew that the representation was untrue.] Second, in making the representation, A intended or [in the alternatively,] knew that it was likely to be acted upon. Third, B, believing the representation, acts to its detriment in reliance on the representation. [It must have been reasonable to rely on the representation.] Fourth, A subsequently seeks to deny the truth of the representation. Fifth, no defence to the estoppel can be raised by A.

A representation can be made by words or conduct. Although the representation must be clear and unambiguous, a representation can be inferred from silence where there is a duty to speak or from negligence where a duty of care has arisen. Under English law, estoppel by representation of fact usually acts as a defence, though it may act in support of a cause of action or counterclaim.

==== Equitable estoppel ====
Under English and Australian legal systems, estoppel in equity includes promissory and proprietary estoppels, described below. (Contrast with estoppel by representation, which is a claim under the English system of law.)

===== Proprietary estoppel =====
In English law, proprietary estoppel is distinct from promissory estoppel. Proprietary estoppel is not a concept in American law, but a similar result is often reached under the general doctrine of promissory estoppel.

Traditionally, proprietary estoppel arose in relation to rights to use the land of the owner, and possibly in connection with disputed transfers of ownership. Although proprietary estoppel was only traditionally available in disputes affecting title to real property, it has now gained limited acceptance in other areas of law. Proprietary estoppel is closely related to the doctrine of constructive trust.

Edward Fry in the High Court summarized the five elements for proprietary estoppel as:

- the claimant
  - made a mistake as to his legal rights (typically because the actual owner attempted to convey the property, but the transfer is invalid or ineffective for some reason);
  - did some act of reliance;
- the defendant
  - knows of the existence of a legal right which he (the defendant) possesses, and which is inconsistent with the right claimed by the claimant;
  - knows of the claimant's mistaken belief; and
  - encouraged the claimant in his act of reliance.

Example: A father promised a house to his son who took possession and spent a large sum of money improving the property, but the father never actually transferred the house to the son. Upon the father's death, the son claimed to be the equitable owner. The court found the testamentary trustees (as representatives of the deceased father's estate) were estopped from denying the son's proprietary interest, and ordered them to convey the land to the son.

===== Promissory estoppel =====
The doctrine of promissory estoppel prevents one party from withdrawing a promise made to a second party if the latter has reasonably relied on that promise.

A promise made without consideration is generally not enforceable. It is known as a bare or gratuitous promise. Thus, if a car salesman promises a potential buyer not to sell a certain car over the weekend, but does so, the promise cannot be enforced. But should the car salesman accept from the potential buyer even one penny in consideration for the promise, the promise will be enforceable in court by the potential buyer. Estoppel extends the court's purview even to cases where there is no consideration, though it is generally not a 'sword': not a basis on which to initiate a lawsuit.

In English jurisprudence, the doctrine of promissory estoppel was first developed in Hughes v Metropolitan Railway Co [1877] but was lost for some time until it was resurrected by Lord Denning in the controversial case of Central London Property Trust Ltd v High Trees House Ltd.

Promissory estoppel requires:

1. an unequivocal promise by words or conduct
2. evidence that there is a change in position of the promisee as a result of the promise (reliance but not necessarily to their detriment)
3. inequity if the promisor were to go back on the promise

In general, estoppel is "a shield not a sword"—it cannot be used as the basis of an action on its own. It also does not extinguish rights. In High Trees the plaintiff company was able to restore payment of full rent from early 1945, and could have restored the full rent at any time after the initial promise was made provided a suitable period of notice had been given. In this case, the estoppel was applied to a "negative promise", that is, one where a party promises not to enforce full rights.

Estoppel is an equitable (as opposed to common law) construct and its application is therefore discretionary. In the case of D & C Builders v Rees Lord Denning refused to enforce a promise to accept a part payment of £300 on a debt of £482 on the basis that it was extracted by duress (the majority decided the case on common law principles)D & C Builders Ltd v Rees [1965 EWCA Civ 3 (12 November 1965)]. In Combe v Combe Denning elaborated on the equitable nature of estoppel by refusing to allow its use as a "sword" by an ex-wife to extract funds from the destitute husband.

The general rule is that when one party agrees to accept a lesser sum in full payment of a debt, the debtor has given no consideration, and so the creditor is still entitled to claim the debt in its entirety. This is not the case if the debtor offers payment at an earlier date than was previously agreed, because the benefit to the creditor of receiving payment early can be thought of as consideration for the promise to waive the rest of the debt. This is the rule formulated in Pinnel's Case, and affirmed in Foakes v Beer.

The decision of the Court of Appeal in Collier v P & MJ Wright (Holdings) Ltd suggests that the doctrine of promissory estoppel can now operate to mitigate the harshness of this common law rule. Moreover, Lady Justice Arden held that allowing a creditor to renege on his promise to forebear seeking the balance of a debt in return for part payment would be, in and of itself, inequitable. Therefore, the only reliance that the promisee must demonstrate is the actual making of the part payment. This approach has been criticised as doing violence to the principle set down in Hughes and the extent to which the other members of the Court, namely Lord Justice Longmore, agreed with it is uncertain.

=== United States ===
==== Equitable estoppel ====
Equitable estoppel is the American counterpart to estoppel by representation. Its elements are summarized as:

- Facts misrepresented or concealed
- Knowledge of true facts
- Fraudulent intent
- Inducement and reliance
- Injury to complainant
- Clear, concise, unequivocal proof of actus (not by implication)

For example, in Aspex Eyewear v. Clariti Eyewear, eyeglass frame maker Aspex sued competitor Clariti for patent infringement. Aspex waited three years, without responding to a request that it list the infringed patent claims, before asserting its patent in litigation. During this period, Clariti expanded its marketing and sales of the products. The Federal Circuit found that Aspex misled Clariti to believe it would not enforce its patent, and thus estopped Aspex from proceeding with the suit.

Another example of equitable estoppel is the case of Sakharam Ganesh Pandit, an Indian emigrant and lawyer who was granted American citizenship in 1914 due to his designation as "white". Subsequently, Pandit bought property, was admitted to the California bar, married a white woman, and renounced his rights to property and inheritance in British India. Following the Supreme Court case United States v. Thind, which found that Indians were considered non-white, and in which Pandit represented the applicant, Bhagat Singh Thind, the US government moved to strip Pandit of his "illegally procured" citizenship. Pandit successfully challenged the denaturalization, arguing that under equitable estoppel, he would be unjustly harmed by losing his citizenship, as it would cause him to become stateless, lose his profession as a lawyer, and make his marriage illegal. In U.S. v. Pandit, the U.S. Court of Appeals for the Ninth Circuit upheld Pandit's citizenship, ending denaturalization processes against him and other Indian-Americans.

==== Promissory estoppel ====
In many jurisdictions of the United States, promissory estoppel is an alternative to consideration as a basis for enforcing a promise. It is also sometimes called detrimental reliance.

The American Law Institute in 1932 included the principle of estoppel into § 90 of the Restatement of Contracts, stating:

A promise which the promisor should reasonably expect to induce action or forbearance of a definite and substantial character on the part of the promisee and which does induce such action or forbearance is binding if injustice can be avoided only by enforcement of the promise.

The Restatement (Second) removed the requirement that the detriment be "substantial".

However:

Equitable estoppel is distinct from promissory estoppel. Promissory estoppel involves a clear and definite promise, while equitable estoppel involves only representations and inducements. The representations at issue in promissory estoppel go to future intent, while equitable estoppel involves statement of past or present fact. It is also said that equitable estoppel lies in tort, while promissory estoppel lies in contract. The major distinction between equitable estoppel and promissory estoppel is that the former is available only as a defense, while promissory estoppel can be used as the basis of a cause of action for damages.

— 28 Am Jur 2d Estoppel and Waiver § 34

Suppose that B goes to a store and sees a sign that the price of a radio is $10. B tells the shopkeeper that he will get the money and come back later that day to purchase it; there is no discussion of price. The shopkeeper says that when B returns, he will welcome B as a customer—unless he sells all three of his radios first. Hearing this, B goes and sells his watch for $10 (it was really worth $15, but since B wanted the money right away, he chose not to wait for the best price). When B returns, the sign says $11, and the owner tells B that he has raised the price. In equity, can it be argued that the shopkeeper is estopped by conduct? B relied upon the implied representation that a radio would be sold for $10 when he returned with the money; B has sold his watch at a discount, to his detriment. (This element would be absent if B sold the watch at the market price.) But the shopkeeper did not guarantee to hold one of the radios against the possibility of B's return nor did they agree a fixed price.

In some common-law jurisdictions, a promise by the shopkeeper to hold a specific radio would create a binding contract, even if B had to go for the money. A promise to pay the owner in the future is good consideration if it is made in exchange for a promise to sell a specific radio (one from three is probably sufficiently specific): one promise in exchange for a second promise creates equal value. So the shopkeeper's actual words and knowledge are critical to deciding whether either a contract or an estoppel arises.

The drafters of the Second Restatement debated how to calculate the amount of damages flowing from a promissory estoppel, using the following example: a young man's uncle promises to give him $1,000 to buy a car. The young man buys a car for $500, but the uncle refuses to pay any money. Is the young man entitled to $1,000 (the amount promised), or merely $500 (the amount he actually lost)? The Restatement states that "The remedy granted for breach may be limited as justice requires", leaving quantification to the discretion of the court.

== Other estoppels ==
=== Pais ===
Estoppel in pais (literally "by act of notoriety", or "solemn formal act") is the historical root of common law estoppel by representation and equitable estoppel. The terms "estoppel in pais" and "equitable estoppel" are used interchangeably in American law.

=== Convention ===
Estoppel by convention in English law (also known as estoppel by agreement) occurs where two parties negotiate or operate a contract but make a mistake. If they share an assumption, belief, or understanding of the contract's interpretation or legal effect, then they are bound by it, if:

1. They both knew the other had the same belief, and
2. They both based their subsequent dealings on those beliefs.

Estoppel by convention is most commonly invoked if one party wishes to rely on pre-contract negotiation as an aid to construction of the contract.

Estoppel by convention was first considered by the Supreme Court in Tinkler v HMRC [2021] UKSC 39. Due to a clerical error, HMRC had sent a notice of inquiry into the appellant's tax return to the wrong address, with a copy to the appellant's accountant. Since the notice was required to be served on the appellant personally rather than to his agent, the Court of Appeal found that no valid enquiry had been opened. HMRC appealed to the Supreme Court, which found that since the appellant had given his accountants the authority to correspond with HMRC on the matter and they proceeded on the shared mistaken assumption that it was valid, he was estopped from disputing the enquiry's validity.

It is debatable whether estoppel by convention is a separate estoppel doctrine, or merely a case of estoppel by representation, or of the rule of interpretation that, where words in a contract are ambiguous, one always interprets those words so as to give effect to the actual intentions of the parties even if that would not be the usual legal outcome (see Amalgamated Investment and Property Co Ltd v Texas Commerce International Bank Ltd [1982] QB 84).

=== Acquiescence ===
Estoppel by acquiescence may arise when one person gives a legal warning to another based on some clearly asserted facts or legal principle, and the other does not respond within "a reasonable period of time". By acquiescing, the other person is generally considered to have lost the legal right to assert the contrary.

As an example, suppose that Jill has been storing her car on Jack's land with no contract between them. Jack sends a registered letter to Jill's legal address, stating: "I am no longer willing to allow your car to stay here for free. Please come get your car, or make arrangements to pay me rent for storing it. If you do not do so, within 30 days, I will consider the car abandoned and will claim ownership of it. If you need more time to make arrangements, please contact me within 30 days, and we can work something out." If Jill does not respond, she may be said to have relinquished her ownership of the car, and estoppel by acquiescence may prevent any court from invalidating Jack's actions of registering the car in his name and using it as his own.

=== Contractual ===
The law relating to contractual estoppel (in English law) was summarised in Peekay Intermark Ltd v Australia and New Zealand Banking Group Ltd [2006] EWCA Civ 386:

There is no reason in principle why parties to a contract should not agree that a certain state of affairs should form the basis for the transaction, whether it be the case or not. For example, it may be desirable to settle a disagreement as to an existing state of affairs in order to establish a clear basis for the contract itself and its subsequent performance. Where parties express an agreement of that kind in a contractual document neither can subsequently deny the existence of the facts and matters upon which they have agreed, at least so far as concerns those aspects of their relationship to which the agreement was directed. The contract itself gives rise to an estoppel ...

=== Deed ===
Estoppel by deed is a rule of evidence arising from the status of a contract signed under seal—such agreements, called deeds, are more strictly enforced than ordinary contracts and the parties are expected to take greater care to verify the contents before signing them. Hence, once signed, all statements of fact (usually found in the opening recital which sets out the reason(s) for making the deed) are conclusive evidence against the parties who are estopped from asserting otherwise.

=== Conflict estoppel ===
"[O]ne who by his speech or conduct has induced another to act in a particular manner ought not be permitted to adopt an inconsistent position, attitude or course of conduct may not be adopted to loss or injury of another". For example, as between two or more claimants, a party that takes multiple and inconsistent legal positions is estopped to assert its positions against another consistent and certain claim, i.e. preferential treatment for certain over uncertain claims.

=== Issue estoppel ===
Issue estoppel, also known as issue preclusion, prevents, in some cases, an issue that has already been litigated and decided on the merits from being re-litigated, even when the parties are different. In the world of crime, some cases have achieved notoriety, e.g. in the Birmingham Six saga, the House of Lords ruled in Hunter v Chief Constable of the West Midlands Police (1982) that issue estoppel applied. Lord Diplock said:

[This case] concerns the inherent power which any court of justice must possess to prevent misuse of its procedure in a way which, although not inconsistent with the literal application of its procedural rules, would nevertheless be manifestly unfair to a party to litigation before it, or would otherwise bring the administration of justice into disrepute among right-thinking people.

A variant of issue estoppel also precludes a party from bringing a claim in subsequent proceedings which ought properly to have been brought as part of earlier legal proceedings.

== In other legal traditions ==
=== Civil law ===
There is no principle of estoppel in European civil law. Instead, the coherence principle is followed, which has the equivalent effect of prohibiting inconsistent conduct. The Lex Mercatoria, a medieval body of commercial law, included the principle Nemo potest venire contra factum proprium, "no one can come against their own acts". This stipulates that a party to a contract may not set itself in contradiction to its previous conduct, if the other party has relied on such conduct. Such inconsistency is prohibited, because can cause harm to the other party and allow the party to evade contractual provisions. The principle is included in the French civil code and was introduced to the international UNIDROIT principles in 2004.

=== Australia ===
The doctrine of promissory estoppel was adopted into Australian law in Legione v Hateley. However, the plaintiffs were unsuccessful in that case because the reliance was unreasonable and the promise not unequivocal.

Australian law has now gone beyond the position espoused in the English High Trees case, to cases where there is no pre-existing legal relationship between the two parties, and promissory estoppel can be wielded as a "sword", not just as a "shield". Mason CJ and Wilson J in Waltons Stores (Interstate) Ltd v Maher held that if estoppel is proven, it gives rise to an equity in favour of the plaintiff, and the court will do the minimum equity that is just in the circumstances. From this case, it is also possible for the promise to come from silence or inaction.

Stated by Brennan J in Waltons Stores:

To establish an equitable estoppel, it is necessary for the plaintiff to prove that 1) the plaintiff assumed that a particular legal relationship would exist between them (and in the latter case) that the defendant would not be free to withdraw from that expected legal relationship; 2) the defendant has induced the plaintiff to adopt that assumption or expectation; 3) the plaintiff acts or abstains from acting in reliance on the assumption or expectation; 4) the defendant knew or intended him to do so; 5) the plaintiff's action or inaction will occasion detriment if the assumption of expectation is not fulfilled; and 6) the defendant has failed to act to avoid that detriment whether by fulfilling the assumption or expectation of otherwise.

Although there is some debate as to whether "unconscionability" is an element that English courts need to take into account when considering estoppel by representation of fact, the Australian courts clearly do. This element is satisfied if one party encourages the other party to create assumptions that lead to reliance.

Today, the principle of estoppel may give birth to an enforceable obligation even without a consideration under the following conditions:

1. promise
2. dishonest behaviour of the promisor
3. special relationship between the promisor and the promisee, (e.g., duty of information);
4. irreversible change of position on the part of the promisee

When enforcing an estoppel, Australian courts will look to the impact that enforcement will have on others, especially third parties. Relief in estoppel thus remains discretionary, and will not always be granted based on the expectation of the plaintiff.

The status of estoppel by representation of fact is less clear in Australia. Two seminal decisions purport to fuse common law and equitable estoppels into a single unified doctrine, but the New South Wales Court of Appeal continues to treat estoppel by representation at common law as distinct from equitable estoppel. This can be significant in deciding which court has jurisdiction to adjudicate on the issue.

Whilst there also exists a doctrine of proprietary estoppel, the High Court of Australia merged this doctrine with the doctrine of promissory estoppel by virtue of their similar criteria.

Nonetheless, authority for the doctrine of proprietary estoppel indicates that if a landlord allows a licensee to expend money on the land under an expectation created or encouraged by the landlord that he/she will be able to remain there, and the licensee suffers a detriment in relying on that expectation, an equity arises in the licensee such as to entitle him/her to stay. Where a proprietary estoppel is found to exist, the court does not have to grant the plaintiff a proprietary interest in the land subject to the dispute. It may instead make an order that the plaintiff receive equitable compensation.

=== India ===
Section 115 of the Indian Evidence Act defines estoppel: "When one person has, by his declaration, act or omission, intentionally caused or permitted another person to believe a thing to be true and to act upon such belief, neither he nor his representative shall be allowed, in any suit or proceeding between himself and such person or his representative, to deny the truth of that thing."

So, for instance, if A intentionally and falsely leads B to believe that certain land belongs to A, and thereby induces B to buy and pay for it, and only later does A acquire the land, then A is not allowed to argue to void the sale on the ground that, at the time of the sale, he had no title.

The doctrine of estoppel is based on the principle that consistency in word and action imparts certainty and honesty to human affairs. If a person makes a representation to another, on the faith of which the latter acts, to his prejudice, the former cannot recant the representation.

However, estoppel has no application to representations made regarding the fundamental rights conferred by the Constitution of India, the source of all laws, which exists not only to benefit individuals but to secure collective rights. Thus, no one can barter away the freedoms conferred upon him by the Constitution. A concession made by him in a proceeding, whether under a mistake of law or otherwise, that he does not possess or will not enforce any particular fundamental right, cannot estop him, as enforcing estoppel would defeat the purpose of the Constitution.

== See also ==
- Acquiescence
- Assignor estoppel
- Collateral estoppel (US)
- De facto corporation and corporation by estoppel (US)
- Direct estoppel
- Estoppel by deed (US)
- Judicial estoppel
- Licensee estoppel
- McDonald v Attorney-General
- Prosecution history estoppel, also known as file-wrapper estoppel (US)
- Res judicata
