= Licensee estoppel =

Licensee estoppel is a doctrine under which a licensee of an intellectual property right, generally a patent or a trademark, is estopped from challenging the validity of the licensed property. The basis for the doctrine is the premise that a licensee should not be able to enjoy the benefit of an agreement and at the same time attack the validity of the intellectual property that forms the basis of the agreement.

== United States ==
In United States patent law, the doctrine has been overturned. In 1969, the U.S. Supreme Court, in Lear v. Adkins, held the doctrine inconsistent with a federal policy that the invalidity of specious patents should be unmasked in order to permit full and free competition in technology ideas that belong in the public domain. The strong public interest in invalidating patents, allowing public access to non-patentworthy technology, justified permitting licensees to challenge patents.

In the United States, the doctrine remains valid in trademark law, where the public policy concerns differ from the patent context. It also applies with respect to trade secret licenses. Courts differ on whether it applies in a copyright context.

== See also ==
- Assignor estoppel
