= Legal estoppel =

Legal estoppel is a principle of law, particularly United States patent law, that an assignor or grantor is not permitted subsequently to deny the validity of title to the subject matter of the assignment or grant. Originally a principle of real property law, applicable to deeds of land and called estoppel by deed, the Supreme Court extended legal estoppel to patents in Westinghouse Elec. & Mfg. Co. v. Formica Insulation Co.

In that case, Chief Justice Taft pointed out that no prior Supreme Court cases existed in which the Court had fully considered the matter, but many lower court decisions starting in 1880 had done so. His explanation for the principle was as follows:

[T]here seems to be no reason why the principles of estoppel by deed should not apply to assignment of a patent right….The grantor purports to convey the right to exclude others, in the one instance, from a defined tract of land, and in the other, from a described and limited field of the useful arts. The difference between the two cases is only the practical one of fixing exactly what is the subject matter conveyed.

He then quoted a lower court opinion to clarify the limits of the doctrine:

It seems to be well settled that the assignor of a patent is estopped from saying his patent is void for want of novelty or utility, or because anticipated by prior inventions. But this estoppel, for manifest reasons, does not prevent him from denying infringement. To determine such an issue, it is admissible to show the state of the art involved, that the court may see what the thing was which was assigned, and thus determine the primary or secondary character of the patent assigned, and the extent to which the doctrine of equivalents may be invoked against an infringer. The court will not assume against an assignor, and in favor of his assignee, anything more than that the invention presented a sufficient degree of utility and novelty to justify the issuance of the patent assigned….

== See also ==
- Assignor estoppel
