= Estoppel by deed =

Doctrine in common law

Estoppel is a common law doctrine which, when it applies, prevents a litigant from denying the truth of what was said or done. The doctrine of estoppel by deed (also known as after-acquired title) is a particular estoppel doctrine in the context of real property transfers. Under the doctrine, the grantor of a deed (generally the seller of a piece of real property) is estopped (barred) from denying the truth of the deed. The doctrine may only be invoked in a suit arising out of the deed, or involving a particular right arising out of the deed.

While rooted in warranty deeds, estoppel by deed has been extended to affect quitclaim deeds if the deed represents that the grantor actually had title.

== Examples ==
1. If O conveys property she does not own to A by warranty deed, but O later acquires title to that land, then title immediately passes to A.
2. However, if, as above, O conveys property she does not own to A by warranty deed, but O later acquires title to that land, A may elect to treat O's lack of title at the time of the conveyance as a breach of the covenants of seisin and right to convey (two of the six traditional forms of Covenants for Title that are contained in a general warranty deed), and sue O for damages. A cannot be forced to accept O's later acquired title if she wishes instead to receive damages.
3. If O conveys property she does not own to A by quitclaim deed, but O later acquires title to that land, then A owns nothing. This is because O passed her interest to A with a quitclaim deed; at the time of the conveyance, O's interest was nothing, so she passed nothing.
