= List of Latin phrases (L) =

This page is one of a series listing English translations of notable Latin phrases, such as veni, vidi, vici and et cetera. Some of the phrases are themselves translations of Greek phrases, as ancient Greek rhetoric and literature started centuries before the beginning of Latin literature in ancient Rome.

Latin	Translation	Notes
labor ipse voluptas	The pleasure is in the work itself.	Motto of Peter King, 1st Baron King as mentioned within 'The Improvement of the Mind. To Which is Added, a discourse on the Education of Children and Youth' by Isaac Watts 1741.
labor omnia vincit	Hard work conquers all.	Popular as a motto; derived from a phrase in Virgil's Eclogue (X.69: omnia vincit Amor – "Love conquers all"); a similar phrase also occurs in his Georgics I.145.
laborare pugnare parati sumus	To work, (or) to fight; we are ready	Motto of the Cal Poly Maritime Academy
labore et honore	By labour and honour	
laboremus pro patria	Let us work for the fatherland	Motto of the Carlsberg breweries
laboris gloria Ludi	Games are the glory of work,	Motto of the Camborne School of Mines, Cornwall, UK
lacrimae rerum	The tears of things	Virgil, Aeneid 1:462
lapsus	lapse, slip, error; involuntary mistake made while writing or speaking	
lapsus calami	inadvertent typographical error, slip of the pen	
lapsus linguae	inadvertent speech error, slip of the tongue	
lapsus memoriae	slip of memory	source of the term memory lapse
latius est impunitum relinqui facinus nocentis (quam innocentem damnari) (Note: Likely a transcription error from satius est)	It is better to let the crime of the guilty go unpunished (than to condemn the innocent)	
lauda finem	praise to the end	Motto of Nottingham High School
laudatio ejus manet in secula seculorum	His Praise Remains unto Ages of Ages	Motto of Galway
laudator temporis acti	praiser of time past	One who is discontent with the present and instead prefers things of the past ("the good old days"). In Horace's Ars Poetica, line 173; motto of HMS Veteran
laudetur Jesus Christus	Praise (Be) Jesus Christ	Often used as a salutation, but also used after prayers or the reading of the gospel
laus Deo	praise be to God	Inscription on the east side at the peak of the Washington Monument in Washington, D.C.; motto of the Viscount of Arbuthnott and Sydney Grammar School; title of a poem by John Greenleaf Whittier commemorating the passage of the 13th Amendment
lectio brevior potior	The shorter reading is the better	A maxim in text criticism. Codified, but simultaneously refuted, by Johann Jakob Griesbach.
lectio difficilior potior	The more difficult reading is the stronger	
lectori salutem (L. S.)	greetings to the reader	Often abbreviated to L.S., used as opening words for a letter
lege artis	according to the law of the art	Denotes that a certain intervention is performed in a correct way. Used especially in a medical context. The 'art' referred to in the phrase is medicine.
legem terrae	the law of the land	
leges humanae nascuntur, vivunt, et moriuntur	laws of man are born, live and die	
leges sine moribus vanae	laws without morals [are] vain	From Horace's Odes; motto of the University of Pennsylvania
legio patria nostra	The Legion is our fatherland	Motto of the French Foreign Legion
legi, intellexi, et condemnavi	I read, understood, and condemned.	
legis plenitudo charitas	charity (love) is the fulfilment of the law	Motto of Ratcliffe College, UK and of the Rosmini College, NZ
legitime	lawfully	In Roman and civil law, a forced share in an estate; the portion of the decedent's estate from which the immediate family cannot be disinherited. From the French héritier legitime (rightful heir).
levavi occlos	I will lift my eyes	Motto of Hollins University and Keswick School, derived from Psalm 121 (Levavi oculos meos in montes)
lex artis	law of the skill	The rules that regulate a professional duty
lex dei vitae lampas	the law of God is the lamp of life	Motto of the Presbyterian Ladies' College, Melbourne
lex dilationes abhorret	The law abhors delay	alternatively, lex dilationes semper abhorret
lex est quodcumque notamus	the law is whatever we write down	Motto of the Chamber of Notaries of Paris. Also lex est quod notamus.
lex ferenda	the law that should be borne	The law as it ought to be
lex hac edictalilex hac edictali	the law here proclaims	The rule whereby a spouse cannot by deed inter vivos or bequeath by testament to his or her second spouse more than the amount of the smallest portion given or bequeathed to any child.
lex in casulex in casu	law in the event	A law that only concerns one particular case; see law of the case
lex lata	the law that has been borne	The law as it is
lex loci	law of the place	Determination in the choice of law
lex non cogit ad impossibilia	the law does not compel the impossible	alternatively impotentia excusat legam, impossibilium nulla obligatio est
lex non scripta	law that has not been written	Unwritten law, or common law
lex orandi, lex credendi	the law of prayer is the law of faith	
lex paciferat	the law shall bring peace	Motto of the European Gendarmerie Force
lex parsimoniae	law of succinctness	also known as Occam's razor
lex rex	the law [is] king	A principle of government advocating a rule by law rather than by men. The phrase originated as a double entendre in the title of Samuel Rutherford's controversial book Lex, Rex (1644), which espoused a theory of limited government and constitutionalism.
lex scripta	written law	Statutory law; contrasted with lex non scripta
lex talionis	the law of retaliation	Retributive justice (i.e., eye for an eye)
Libertas Justitia Veritas	Liberty Justice Truth	Motto of the Korea University and Free University of Berlin
Libertas perfundet omnia luce	Freedom will flood all things with light	Motto of the University of Barcelona and the Complutense University of Madrid
Libertas quae sera tamen	freedom which [is] however late	Liberty even when it comes late; motto of Minas Gerais, Brazil
Libertas Securitas Justitia	Liberty Security Justice	Motto of the Frontex
libra (lb)	balance; scales	Its abbreviation lb is used as a unit of weight, the pound.
lignum crucis arbor scientiae	The wood of the cross is the tree of knowledge	School motto of Denstone College
lingua franca	Language of the Franks	Often used to describe a common language adopted by people who have different native languages
littera scripta manet	The written word endures	Attributed to Horace. Motto of the National Archives and Records Administration.
loco citato (lc)	in the place cited	More fully written in loco citato; see also opere citato
locum tenens	place holder	A worker who temporarily takes the place of another with similar qualifications, for example as a doctor or a member of the clergy; usually shortened to locum.
locus classicus	a classic place	The most typical or classic case of something; quotation which most typifies its use.
locus minoris resistentiae	place of less resistance	A medical term to describe a location on or in a body that offers little resistance to infection, damage, or injury. For example, a weakened place that tends to be reinjured.
locus poenitentiae	a place of repentance	A legal term, it is the opportunity of withdrawing from a projected contract, before the parties are finally bound; or of abandoning the intention of committing a crime, before it has been completed.
locus sigili (l.s.)	place of the seal	the area on a contract where the seal is to be affixed
locus standi	A right to stand	Standing in law (the right to have one's case in court)
longissimus dies cito conditur	even the longest day soon ends	Pliny the Younger, Epistulae 9/36:4
lorem ipsum		A garbled version of a passage from Cicero's De finibus bonorum et malorum, widely used as a sample text for greeking (laying out text in printing before the final text is available). The original passage reads ...neque porro quisquam est, qui dolorem ipsum, quia dolor sit amet consectetur adipisci velit... ("...nor again is there anyone who loves or pursues or desires to obtain pain of itself, because it is pain...").
luce veritatis	By the light of truth	School motto of Queen Margaret College
luceat lux vestra	Let your light shine	From Matthew Ch. 5 V. 16; popular as a school motto
lucem sequimur	We follow the light	Motto of the University of Exeter
luceo non uro	I shine, not burn	Motto of the Highland Scots Clan Mackenzie
lucida sidera	The shining stars	Horace, Carmina 1/3:2
luctor et emergo	I struggle and emerge	Motto of the Dutch province of Zeeland to denote its battle against the sea, and the Athol Murray College of Notre Dame
Luctor, non mergor	I struggle, but am not overwhelmed	Motto of the Glass Family (Sauchie, Scotland)
lucus a non lucendo	[it is named] a "grove" because it is not lit	From late 4th-century grammarian Honoratus Maurus, who sought to mock implausible word origins such as those proposed by Priscian. It is a jesting suggestion that since the word lucus (dark grove) has a similar appearance to the verb lucere (to shine), the former word is derived from the latter word because of a lack of light in wooded groves. Often used as an example of absurd etymology, it derives from parum luceat (it does not shine [being darkened by shade]) by Quintilian in Institutio Oratoria.
ludemus bene in compania	We play well in groups	Motto of the Barony of Marinus
lupus est homo homini	A man to a man is a wolf	Plautus' adaptation of an old Roman proverb: homo homini lupus est ("man is a wolf to [his fellow] man"). In Asinaria, act II, scene IV, verse 89 [495 overall]. Lupus est homo homini, non homo, quom qualis sit non novit ("a man to a man is a wolf, not a man, when the other doesn't know of what character he is.")
lupus in fabula	the wolf in the story	With the meaning "speak of the wolf, and he will come"; from Terence's play Adelphoe.
lupus non mordet lupum	a wolf does not bite a wolf	
lupus non timet canem latrantem	a wolf is not afraid of a barking dog	
lux aeterna	eternal light	epitaph
lux et lex	light and law	Motto of the Franklin & Marshall College and the University of North Dakota
lux et veritas	light and truth	A translation of the Hebrew Urim and Thummim. Motto of several institutions, including Yale University.
lux ex tenebris	light from darkness	Motto of the 67th Network Warfare Wing
lux hominum vita	light the life of man	Motto of the University of New Mexico
lux in Domino	light in the Lord	Motto of the Ateneo de Manila University
lux in tenebris lucet	The light that shines in the darkness	Motto of Columbia University School of General Studies Also: John 1:5.
lux libertas	light and liberty	Motto of the University of North Carolina at Chapel Hill
Lux mentis Lux orbis	Light of the mind, Light of the world	Motto of Sonoma State University
lux sit	let there be light	A more literal Latinization of the phrase; the most common translation is fiat lux, from Latin Vulgate Bible phrase chosen for the Genesis line "וַיֹּאמֶר אֱלֹהִים, יְהִי אוֹר; וַיְהִי-אוֹר" (And God said: 'Let there be light.' And there was light). Motto of the University of Washington.
lux tua nos ducat	Your light guides us	
lux, veritas, virtus	light, truth, courage	Motto of Northeastern University
lux, vita, caritas	light, life, love	Motto of St John's College, Johannesburg

== Notes and references ==
Notes
