= Glasser v. United States =

- Supreme Court of the United States

Argued November 13–14, 1941 Decided January 19, 1942
- Full case name: Daniel D. Glasser, Norton I. Kretske, and Alfred E. Roth v. United States
- Citations: 315 U.S. 60 (more) 62 S. Ct. 457; 86 L. Ed. 680

Case history
- Prior: United States v. Glasser, 116 F.2d 690 (7th Cir. 1940), cert. granted, 313 U.S. 551 (1941).
- Subsequent: Rehearing denied, 315 U.S. 827 (1942).

Holding
- (1) A defense lawyer's conflict of interest arising from a simultaneous representation of co-defendants violates the Assistance of Counsel Clause of the Sixth Amendment (2) The exclusion of women from the jury pool, other than members of the League of Women Voters who have attended a jury training class, violates the fair-cross section requirement of the Impartial Jury Clause of the Sixth Amendment

Court membership
- Chief Justice Harlan F. Stone Associate Justices Owen Roberts · Hugo Black; Stanley F. Reed · Felix Frankfurter; William O. Douglas · Frank Murphy; James F. Byrnes · Robert H. Jackson

Case opinions
- Majority: Murphy, joined by Roberts, Black, Reed, Douglas, Byrnes
- Dissent: Frankfurter, joined by Stone
- Jackson took no part in the consideration or decision of the case.

Laws applied
- U.S. Const. amend. VI

Glasser v. United States, 315 U.S. 60 (1942), is a landmark decision of the US Supreme Court on two issues of constitutional criminal procedure. Glasser was the first Supreme Court decision to hold that the Assistance of Counsel Clause of the Sixth Amendment required the reversal of a criminal defendant's conviction if his lawyer's representation of him was limited by a conflict of interest.

Further, Glasser held that the exclusion of women (other than members of the League of Women Voters who had taken a jury training class) from the jury pool violated the Impartial Jury Clause of the Sixth Amendment, but declined to reverse the other two convictions on this ground for technical reasons. Glasser is the first majority opinion of the Court to use the phrase "cross-section of the community". Glasser was also the first jury discrimination case to invoke the Sixth Amendment (rather than Equal Protection Clause of the Fourteenth Amendment).

The facts of Glasser were unusual as well. According to a contemporary Chicago Tribune article, it was "the first time federal employees here have been charged with tampering with federal court justice". The five-week trial involved more than 100 witnesses, more than 4,000 transcript pages of testimony and argument, and 228 exhibits.

== Background ==
All of the Court's prior jury pool discrimination cases had involved the exclusion of African-Americans and been litigated under the Fourteenth Amendment's Equal Protection Clause. The Court had come the closest to articulating a "fair cross-section of the community" doctrine in Smith v. Texas (1940). There, the Court stated: "It is part of the established tradition in the use of juries as instruments of public justice that the jury be a body truly representative of the community."

Daniel D. Glasser and Norton I. Kretske were Assistant United States Attorneys in the Northern District of Illinois, specializing in liquor and revenue offenses. Glasser and Kretske solicited bribes from defendants under indictment, or soon to be indicted. Glasser and six other assistants resigned on April 7, 1939, during the tenure of U.S. Attorney William Joseph Campbell. According to Campbell: "Mr. Glasser has the best record of convictions of any one in this office and his conviction record in alcohol cases is the best in the entire country. Since I have been in office, Mr. Glasser has prosecuted ninety-nine cases and lost only one. He hasn't lost a jury case in three and a half years."

== Prior history ==
=== District Court ===
==== Indictment ====
U.S. Attorney Campbell presented the case to the grand jury personally. Glasser, Kretske, Alfred E. Roth, Anthony Horton, and Louis Kaplan were indicted in the United States District Court for the Northern District of Illinois on two counts of a bribery conspiracy on September 29, 1939. Glasser and Kretske were former Assistant U.S. Attorneys; Roth was a defense attorney representing the bribe payors in the majority of the cases alleged to be fixed; and Horton and Kaplan were "go-betweens" for the bribes. Horton was an African-American bail bondsman; Kaplan was a purveyor of untaxed liquor. The allegations were that the prosecutors either agreed to recommend the dismissal of charges or ensured that the grand jury would not return an indictment. The maximum authorized sentence under the charges was two years imprisonment and a $10,000 fine. All five made bail of $1,500 each.

==== Prosecution's case ====
The trial began on February 6, 1940 before Judge Patrick Thomas Stone, of the Western District of Wisconsin, sitting by designation. The prosecution's opening statement was delivered by Martin Ward, the chief of the criminal division. Defense attorney William Scott Stewart's opening statement argued that Glasser and Kretske were set up by E.C. Yellowly, the head of the alcohol tax unit. Stewart was the leader of a "battery of high priced defense counsel."

The government's first witness, U.S. Attorneys' Office clerk Gordon Morgan testified that Glasser had suggested that Sidney S. Eckstone be appointed foreperson of a grand jury that returned only eight out of twenty indictments and that Glasser and Eckstone had conferred frequently. Another prosecution witness, illegal distillery landlord William F. Workman, testified that Capone-affiliated Louis Schiavone had posted approximately $1,000,000 in bail bonds.

On the sixth day of trial, alcohol tax agent Patrick Donoghue testified that, in a case that Donoghue had investigated, Glasser persuaded a grand jury to reverse itself after returning an indictment by placing the matter on the pending call indefinitely. Another government witness, bootlegging handyman Ralph Sharp testified that he had paid Kretske $250 in order for Kretske, as prosecutor, to recommend that the charges against him be dismissed (which they were). Frank Hodorowicz, another bootlegger turned government witness, testified that he had paid Kretske $1,300 to recommend the dismissal of two cases and was convicted in the third case after he refused to pay $1,000. After he was indicted the third time, he testified, Glasser declined to intervene on his behalf, saying: "You're going to jail for five years; I can't do anything about it. For all the money in the world I couldn't help you. This isn't an ordinary case. Agents are in town from Washington."

Still another, Walter Kwiatkowski, testified that he paid Horton $600 (in addition to the $200 bond) to have the case against him dropped where Glasser was acting as prosecutor. And another, Victor Raubunas, testified that he twice paid bribes to Kretske in cases that Glasser was handling (Raubunas was convicted a third time, after refusing to pay Kretske, in a case prosecuted by Ward himself). Mae and Anthony Jurkas, two small-time bootleggers, testified that Glasser declined to prosecute them in exchange for the name of their bootlegging boss.

Bootlegger Nicholas Abosketes and his accountant William Brantman testified that Abosketes transferred $3,000 to Brantman that was paid to Kretske. Alexander Campbell, an Assistant U.S. Attorney from Indiana testified that Roth had offered him a bribe in a bootlegging case, saying: "That's the way we handle things in Chicago." The government's final witness, alcohol tax investigator Thomas Bailey, testified that Glasser had repeatedly delayed a grand jury in a case he was involved with.

The government rested its case on February 26. Judge Stone denied the defense's motion for a directed verdict.

==== Defense case ====
Three judges testified as character witnesses: John P. Barnes (N.D. Ill.) on behalf of Glasser, Kretske, and Roth; Charles Edgar Woodward (N.D. Ill.) on behalf of Glasser and Kretske; and state judge John F. Haas on behalf of Kretske. Kaplan and Horton both took the stand, denying that they ever paid money to Glasser or Kretske. Two defense attorneys, Henry Balaban and Edward J. Hess (who was representing Kaplan at the trial), who had also defended clients in cases the government's case-in-chief had alleged to be fixed, denying paying bribes to Glasser or Kretske (although the government had not accused them of this). Glasser's testimony took three hours, as he was cross-examined individually about every single case that the government had alleged to have been fixed.

The defense rested on March 4, after five weeks of trial. Assistant United States Attorney Francis McGreal delivered the prosecution's closing argument. Stewart and George Callaghan closed for Glasser and Kretske; Hess for Kaplan; Cassius Poust for Roth; Ward concluded the government's argument. Stewart's closing focused on the credibility of the prosecution's witnesses, many of whom had been transported from prison to testify. Stewart urged the jury not to take the word of "crooks and convicts."

==== Conviction and sentencing ====
The jury retired at 3:30 p.m. March 7. At 11:30 p.m., Judge Stone ordered the jury to continue deliberating through the night. The jury returned at 7:20 a.m. March 8, after 16 hours of deliberation; all five were convicted of a conspiracy to defraud the United States. For several hours, the jury had been deadlocked 11 to 1 for conviction, with one female juror as the holdout.

Judge Stone denied the defendants' motion for a new trial. Glasser and Kretske were sentenced to 14 months imprisonment. Roth was fined $500; Horton was placed on two-years probation with a suspended sentence of one year and one day. Kaplan was sentenced to 14 months imprisonment, failed to surrender on June 28, and was captured on August 1.

Revenue department special intelligence agent Clarence L. Converse had observed the entire trial with an eye towards a follow-on tax prosecution. On June 3, Judge Philip Leo Sullivan sentenced three of the government witnesses in the trial to probation.

=== Seventh Circuit ===
Glasser, Kretske, and Roth appealed to the United States Court of Appeals for the Seventh Circuit. Oral arguments were heard on October 17 before Judges William Morris Sparks, Walter Emanuel Treanor, and Otto Kerner, Sr. The Seventh Circuit, in an opinion by Judge Kerner, affirmed their convictions on December 13, 1940. "On oral argument the principal point stressed was that the evidence failed to sustain the verdict of the jury, although other points were raised in the briefs."

The defendants argued: (1) that the indictment should have been quashed because of the absence of women from the grand jury; (2) that the indictment was not returned in open court; (3) that the indictment was duplicitous, inconsistent, and vague; (4) that there was insufficient evidence to support the verdict; (5) that the trial judge should have granted a continuance, rather than appoint Stewart to represent Kretske; (6) that Roth should have been severed from the other defendants; (7) that the reports of the Alcohol Tax Unit were hearsay; (7) that the two government exhibits not admitted into evidence were sent to the jury during its deliberations; (8) that Glasser had been cross-examined on matters not pertinent to the charge and not within the scope of his direct examination; (9) that the cross-examination of U.S. Attorney Campbell had been unduly restricted; (10) that evidence beyond the scope of the bill of particulars had been introduced; (11) that there was insufficient corroboration of the accomplice testimony against Kretske; (12) that certain testimony of Alexander Campbell was erroneously admitted; (13) that the admission of various prejudicial evidence had the cumulative effect of denying the defendants a fair trial; (14) that the trial judge's cross-examination of witnesses and other comments crossed the line into advocacy; and (15) that the trial judge should have granted a new trial because of the exclusion of women from the jury pool.

Former United States Attorney General Homer S. Cummings petitioned the Supreme Court for certiorari, which was granted on April 7, 1941. Ralph M. Snyder also represented Glasser before the Supreme Court. By this time, J. Albert Woll was the U.S. Attorney in the Northern District.

== Opinion of the Court ==
In an opinion by Justice Murphy, the Court reversed the conviction of Glasser (No. 30) and affirmed the convictions of the other two defendants (Nos. 31 and 32).

=== Conflict-free counsel ===
Glasser was represented by Callaghan and Stewart. Kretske was dis-satisfied with his prior retained counsel, and the trial judge proposed appointing Stewart to also represent Kretske. Stewart explained the potential conflict thus:

[There is] some little inconsistency in the defense, and the main part of it is this: There will be conversations here where Mr. Glasser wasn't present, where people have seen Mr. Kretske and they have talked about, that they gave money to take care of Glasser, that is not binding on Mr. Glasser, and there is a divergency there, and Mr. Glasser feels that if I would represent Mr. Kretske the jury would get an idea that they are together ...

The trial judge, over the prior objection of Glasser, appointed Stewart to represent Kretske. Stewart represented both Glasser and Kretske throughout the proceeding. Glasser did not raise the issue again until the appeal was filed.

The Court reversed Glasser's conviction because his counsel had a conflict of interest. The Court held that:

[T]he "assistance of counsel" guaranteed by the Sixth Amendment contemplates that such assistance be untrammeled and unimpaired by a court order requiring that one lawyer shall simultaneously represent conflicting interests. If the right to the assistance of counsel means less than this, a valued constitutional safeguard is substantially impaired.

The Court rejected the suggestions that Glasser had waived his Sixth Amendment right by failing to re-object or that Glasser's status as an experienced former federal prosecutor precluded relief.

The Court concluded that the conflict of interest materialized in a few ways. First, Stewart declined to cross-examine one of the witnesses, who could implicate Kretske but not Glasser, for fear that it would strengthen the case against Kretske. Stewart also failed to object to the testimony of other witnesses regarding prior statements of Kretske; under the rules of hearsay, these statements were obviously admissible against Kretske, but less obviously admissible against Glasser without a predicate showing that Glasser was a co-conspirator. (Note: The Court has since concluded that the "bootstrapping rule" articulated in Glasser regarding the admissibility of co-conspirator hearsay was abrogated by the adoption of Rule 801(d)(2)(E) of the Federal Rules of Evidence. See Bourjaily v. United States, 483 U.S. 171, 176–79 (1987).) Stewart feared that an objection only on behalf of Glasser would highlight the admissibility of the statements against Kretske.

In addition to finding that Glasser was prejudiced by the conflict, the Court further stated that:

Glasser wished the benefit of the undivided assistance of counsel of his own choice. We think that such a desire on the part of an accused should be respected. Irrespective of any conflict of interest, the additional burden of representing another party may conceivably impair counsel's effectiveness. To determine the precise degree of prejudice sustained by Glasser as a result of the court's appointment of Stewart as counsel for Kretske is at once difficult and unnecessary. The right to have the assistance of counsel is too fundamental and absolute to allow courts to indulge in nice calculations as to the amount of prejudice arising from its denial.

But, the court declined to reverse the convictions of Kretske and Roth on this basis, concluding that they were not prejudiced.

=== Exclusion of women from the jury pool ===
The defendants alleged in an affidavit that only women who were members of the Illinois League of Women Voters and who had completed a jury training class (taught by a local prosecutor) were included in the jury pool. The defendants' jury was composed of six men and six women.

The Court dwelt at length on the defendants' claim. The Court held that:

[Federal jury selectors] must not allow the desire for competent jurors to lead them into selections which do not comport with the concept of the jury as a cross-section of the community. Tendencies, no matter how slight, toward the selection of jurors by any method other than a process which will insure a trial by a representative group are undermining processes weakening the institution of jury trial, and should be sturdily resisted. That the motives influencing such tendencies may be of the best must not blind us to the dangers of allowing any encroachment whatsoever on this essential right. Steps innocently taken may, one by one, lead to the irretrievable impairment of substantial liberties.

The Court further held that: "The deliberate selection of jurors from the membership of particular private organizations definitely does not conform to the traditional requirements of jury trial." But, the Court held that the submission of an affidavit, even if un-contradicted, which contained an offer to prove the exclusion of women from the jury pool was insufficient to preserve the error; instead, the defendants must actually introduce evidence, or attempt to formally offer evidence, to support the claim.

=== Other issues ===
The court rejected the defendant's other arguments: (1) that women were improperly excluded from the grand jury under Illinois law (as incorporated by federal jury selection law at the time); (2) that the indictment was not returned in open court because the notation indicating that the indictment was returned in open court was added after the fact; (3) that the indictment was insufficiently definite; (4) that the evidence was insufficient to sustain the conviction; (5) that the admission of certain evidence was prejudicial; and (6) that the trial judge's own questioning of certain witnesses and limitations on cross-examination were prejudicial.

The Court stated that: "Since we are of opinion that a new trial must be ordered as to Glasser, we do not at this time feel that it is proper to comment on the sufficiency of the evidence against Glasser." (Note: The Court would later conclude in Burks v. United States, 437 U.S. 1 (1978), that the Double Jeopardy Clause of the Fifth Amendment requires an appellate court to examine the sufficiency of the evidence, even if it reverses the defendant's conviction for procedural reasons, because a reversal for insufficiency would bar retrial.)

=== Frankfurter's dissent ===
Justice Frankfurter, joined by Chief Justice Stone, in dissent, would not have reversed Glasser's conviction. They argued that Glasser had acquiesced to the appointment by his silence, especially in light of his years of experience as a federal criminal prosecutor, and had failed to preserve the error by not objecting. Further, the dissent argued that the joint representation was beneficial:

A conspiracy trial presents complicated questions of strategy for the defense. There are advantages and disadvantages in having separate counsel for each defendant or a single counsel for more than one. Joint representation is a means of insuring against reciprocal recrimination. A common defense often gives strength against a common attack.

Further, the dissent denied that prejudice had arisen in the two examples highlighted by the majority.

== Subsequent developments ==
On remand, Judge Stone denied Kretske probation and set his sentence to begin on April 10, 1942. Judge Sullivan dismissed a different indictment against Kretske on April 9. Judge F. Ryan Duffy, of the Eastern District of Wisconsin, sitting by designation, denied a government motion to dismiss Kretske's habeas petition on April 14 and set a hearing for the following day. Judge Duffy denied Kretske bail and denied the petition of April 15.

Pending retrial, Glasser was free on $2,500 bail. Attorney General Francis Biddle appointed Assistant United States Attorney Edward A. Kelly as a special assistant to consider whether Glasser should be retried. Kelly recommended that Glasser not be retried, and Biddle wrote to Judge Evan Alfred Evans of the Seventh Circuit asking him to assign a judge to the nol pros motion; Judge Evans assigned himself. Over the protests of Judge Evans, all charges against Glasser were dropped on January 6, 1943. Kelly argued to Judge Evans that there would be insufficient evidence at a retrial because much of the original evidence would not be admissible if Glasser were retried alone. Judge Evans was "suspicious" of the motion and "all but argued that the case had been fixed." Glasser returned to private practice.

== Legacy ==
=== Conflict-free counsel ===
Glasser was "the Supreme Court's first vehicle for the examination of joint representation." The Court continued to deal with this issue in Dukes v. Warden (1972), Holloway v. Arkansas (1978), Cuyler v. Sullivan (1980), Burger v. Kemp (1987), Wheat v. United States (1988), and Mickens v. Taylor (2002).

Cuyler summarized Glasser as follows:

Glasser established that unconstitutional multiple representation is never harmless error. Once the Court concluded that Glasser's lawyer had an actual conflict of interest, it refused "to indulge in nice calculations as to the amount of prejudice" attributable to the conflict. The conflict itself demonstrated a denial of the "right to have the effective assistance of counsel." Thus, a defendant who shows that a conflict of interest actually affected the adequacy of his representation need not demonstrate prejudice in order to obtain relief. But until a defendant shows that his counsel actively represented conflicting interests, he has not established the constitutional predicate for his claim of ineffective assistance.

Justice Frankfurther's statement in dissent that "A common defense often gives strength against a common attack" was quoted by the majority in Holloway.

=== Fair cross-section of the community ===
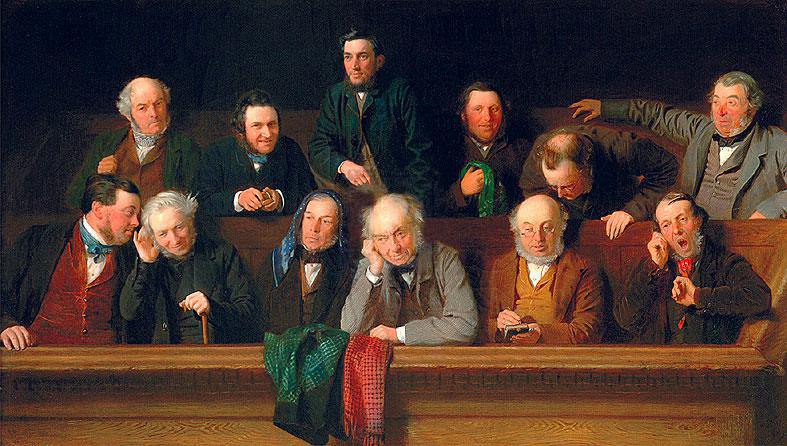
A 19th-century painting of a jury composed exclusively of white men

Glasser is the first majority opinion of the Court to use the phrase "cross-section of the community," and the first jury discrimination case to invoke the Sixth Amendment (rather than equal protection). "The democratic overhaul of the jury began with the Supreme Court's decision in Glasser v. United States."

Prof. Barbara Underwood has opined that:

Equal protection may have seemed inapt to the litigants or to the Court for a case of sex discrimination in 1942, or it may have seemed inapt for a case of cross-group challenge. The Sixth Amendment was not again invoked by the Supreme Court against jury discrimination for thirty years; the Sixth Amendment did not (yet) apply to state juries, and in federal cases the Court seemed to prefer its supervisory power over lower federal courts.

The Supreme Court would eventually reverse criminal convictions due to the exclusion of women from the jury pool in Taylor v. Louisiana (1975) and Duren v. Missouri (1979). The fair cross-section requirement was extended to civil cases in Thiel v. Southern Pacific Co. (1946), where wage earners had been excluded from the jury pool.

== See also ==
- Women in United States juries
