= Plea in equity =

Legal terminology in the common law

A plea in equity, in the common law, is a statement of facts raised by a defendant which operates as a defense to an equitable claim raised by the plaintiff. Traditionally, the plea is required to state new facts, additional to those set forth in the plaintiff's bill in equity, and these facts must support a dispositive defense to the claim such as the passage of a statute of limitations, plaintiff's prior waiver or settlement of the claim, or res judicata.

In the United States, the legal and equitable jurisdiction of most courts has been merged, and the plea in equity has been abolished. However, it remains a valid plea in certain states. In Virginia, a plea in equity may still be filed, and such a filing entitles either party to request a jury trial to decide the facts alleged in the plea.
