= Iftikhar Ahmed v. Syed Meharban Ali =

1974 case concerning res judicata

- Court: Supreme Court of India
- Full case name: Iftikhar Ahmed & Ors v. Syed Meharban Ali & Ors
- Decided: February 26, 1974
- Citation: AIR 1974 SC 749

Holding
- Clarified the conditions under which the doctrine of res judicata applies among co-defendants, preventing repetitive litigation

Court membership
- Judges sitting: K. K. Mathew, A. Alagiriswami

Iftikhar Ahmed v. Syed Meharban Ali., 1974 AIR 749, is a landmark judgement by the Supreme Court of India that clarified the specific conditions under which the doctrine of res judicata can be applied. The ruling strengthened the doctrine and emphasised that application of the rule by the courts "should be influenced by no technical considerations of form, but by matter of substance."
