= Collateral estoppel =

Doctrine that prevents a person from relitigating an issue in court

Collateral estoppel (CE), known in modern terminology as issue preclusion, is a common law estoppel doctrine that prevents a person from relitigating an issue. One summary is that, "once a court has decided an issue of fact or law necessary to its judgment, that decision ... preclude[s] relitigation of the issue in a suit on a different cause of action involving a party to the first case". The rationale behind issue preclusion is the prevention of legal harassment and the prevention of overuse or abuse of judicial resources.

== Issue ==
Parties may be estopped from litigating determinations on issues made in prior actions. The determination may be an issue of fact or an issue of law. Preclusion requires that the issue decided was decided as part of a valid final judgment. In the United States, valid final judgments of state courts are given preclusive effect in other state and federal courts under the Full Faith and Credit Clause of the U.S. Constitution.

Valid final judgments must be issued by courts with appropriate personal and subject matter jurisdiction. It is notable, however, that an error does not make a decision invalid. Reversible errors must be appealed. The legal defense (CE) applies even if an erroneous judgment, or erroneous use of legal principles, occurred in the first action. An incorrect conclusion of the court in the first suit does not cause defendant to forsake the protection of res judicata (and by extension, of CE). A judgment need not be correct to preclude further litigation; it is sufficient that it be final, and that it have been decided on the merits of the case.

Collateral estoppel does not prevent an appeal of a decision, or a party from asking the judge for re-argument or a revised decision. In federal court, judgments on appeal are given preclusive effect. However, if the decision is vacated, the preclusive effect of the judgment fails.

== Due process concerns ==
Collateral estoppel cases raise constitutional due process problems, particularly when it is applied to a party that did not participate in the original suit. Due process mandates that collateral estoppel not be applied to a party that has not litigated the issue in dispute, unless that party is in legal privity to a party that litigated it. In other words, every disputant is entitled to a day in court and cannot ordinarily be bound by the negative result of another disputant's suit, even if that other disputant had exactly the same legal and factual arguments.

Due process concerns also can arise even when a party did have a day in court to dispute an issue. For example, a defendant may have not effectively litigated an issue decided against the defendant in an earlier suit because the damages were too small, so it may be unjust to bar the defendant from relitigating the issue in a trial for much greater damages. As another example, suppose that a defendant did effectively litigate an issue to a favorable conclusion in nine cases, but to an unfavorable result in a tenth case. In this situation, note that the defendant did not have the opportunity to use the nine judgments in its favor as collateral estoppel against subsequent plaintiffs, because that would violate their right to a day in court. As suggested by the U.S. Supreme Court in Parklane Hosiery Co. v. Shore, to allow a subsequent plaintiff to use the tenth, negative judgment as collateral estoppel against the defendant may seem unjust.

== Mutuality ==
Historically, collateral estoppel applied only where there was mutuality of parties, meaning that both the party seeking to employ collateral estoppel and the party against whom collateral estoppel is sought were parties to the prior action.

Most courts in the United States have now abandoned mutuality as a requirement for collateral estoppel in most circumstances. The California Supreme Court case of Bernhard v. Bank of America, authored by justice Roger J. Traynor, began a movement away from the application of mutuality in collateral estoppel. Bernhard claimed that certain assets held by the executor Cook of a decedent's estate were part of that estate, while the executor claimed they had been gifted to him by the decedent. In a previous court action it was decided that the assets were gifts to the executor and not assets in escrow, upon which Bernhard sued the bank that had been holding the assets and that had disbursed them to the executor, alleging again that the assets were property of the estate and should have been handled as estate matter. The bank successfully used CE as defense, arguing that Bernhard had already adjudicated the right to those funds and had lost. The court concluded that it was proper for a new party to take advantage of findings in a previous suit to bar action by a party of that suit. Since Bernhard had a full and fair opportunity to litigate the issue in her first suit, the court did not allow her to retry the same issue by merely switching defendants. The precedent of Bernhard holds that collateral estoppel may be used as defense against any party who has fully and fairly litigated an issue in a previous action.

In the absence of mutuality, courts are more hesitant to apply collateral estoppel in an offensive setting than in a defensive one. In other words, courts are more hesitant to apply collateral estoppel to a defendant from a previous action if the defendant is sued by a new plaintiff for the same issue.

== Strategy ==
Collateral estoppel may be used either defensively or offensively; mutually or non-mutually:

- Defensive mutual collateral estoppel
  - Used against the plaintiff from the first suit regarding issue(s) that were previously litigated against the defendant from the first suit
- Defensive non-mutual collateral estoppel
  - Used by a new defendant in a subsequent suit who wants to assert a final judgment on an issue(s) against the plaintiff from the first suit
- Offensive mutual collateral estoppel
  - Used against the defendant from the first suit by the plaintiff (from the first suit) in a subsequent suit thereby preventing relitigation on an issue already decided
- Offensive non-mutual collateral estoppel
  - Used by a new plaintiff in a subsequent suit who wants to assert a final judgment on an issue(s) against the defendant from the first suit
  - U.S. Courts employ "Fairness Factors" from Parklane Hosiery Co. v. Shore, to determine validity of the offensive non-mutual collateral estoppel:
    1. Could the party trying to assert collateral estoppel have intervened in the earlier suit?
    2. Did defendant have incentive to litigate the first action?
    3. Are there multiple, prior inconsistent judgments?
    4. Are there any procedural opportunities available to defendant in the second suit that were not available in the first suit?

Collateral estoppel may be avoided as a defense if the claimant did not have a full and fair opportunity to litigate the issue decided by a state court, which means he may file suit in federal court to challenge the adequacy of state procedures. Note that in this case the plaintiff's suit would be against the state, not against the other party from the prior lawsuit.

In the U.S., the doctrine of offensive non-mutual collateral estoppel does not extend to the U.S. government; it is limited to private litigants.

== Rationale ==
Collateral estoppel is an efficiency rule that is meant to save judicial resources by avoiding the relitigation of issues of fact that have already been litigated. The rule is also intended to protect defendants from the inequity of having to defend the same issue repeatedly.

But note that the use of offensive non-mutual collateral estoppel may work against the goal of judicial economy. The offensive use encourages potential plaintiffs to sit and "test the waters" to see the strength of the defendant's case. If the defendant's case is weak, there is great incentive for new parties to sue and claim that the defendant is estopped based on the prior adverse ruling.

== Related concepts ==
Collateral estoppel is closely related to the concept of claim preclusion, which prevents parties relitigating the same cause of action after it has been decided by a judge or jury. Res judicata (literally - that which has been decided) can be used as the term for both concepts, or purely as a synonym for claim preclusion. Under the doctrine of res judicata, a judgment on the merits in a prior suit bars a second suit involving the same parties or their privies based on the same cause of action. Under the doctrine of collateral estoppel, on the other hand, the second action is upon a different cause of action and the judgment in the prior suit precludes relitigation of issues litigated and necessary to the outcome of the first action.

Res judicata may be used as a defense in a second suit which involves the same claim as a prior suit, and is conclusive on all matters which were litigated as well as all matters which could have been litigated in the prior suit. In collateral estoppel the judgment is conclusive only regarding the issues which were litigated. In order for CE to apply, four factors must be met:

- The issues in the second suit are the same as in the first suit
- The issues in the first suit must have been litigated
- The issues in the first suit must have been decided
- The issues must have been necessary to the court's judgment

See also direct estoppel.

== Criminal law ==
Although issue preclusion emerged from civil law, in the United States it has applied to federal criminal law since United States v. Oppenheimer in 1916. In 1970 in Ashe v. Swenson, the United States Supreme Court applied it to double jeopardy to limit prosecution for crimes committed at the same time.
