= Women in United States juries =

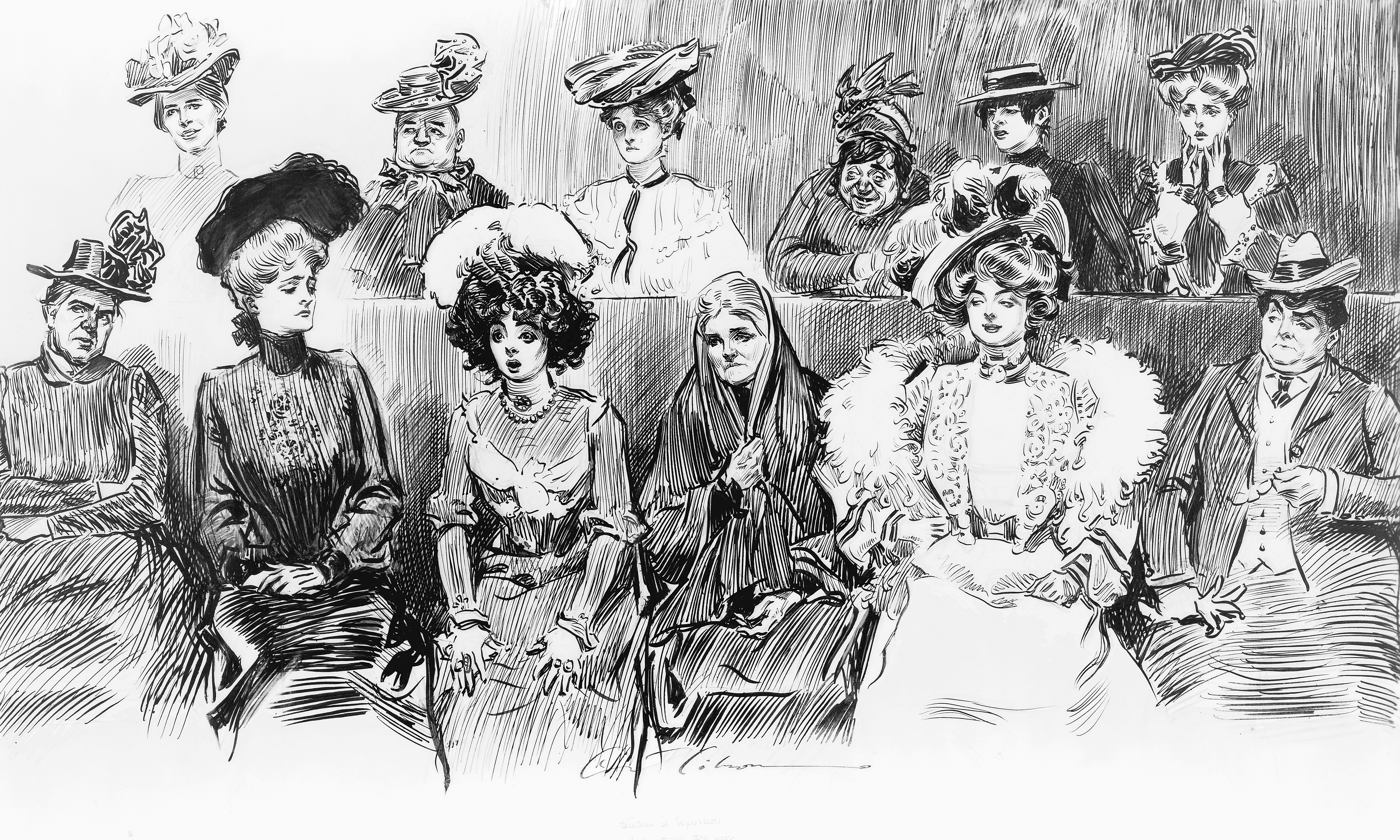
The idea of women sitting on juries in the United States was subject to ridicule up until the 20th century. Studies in expression. When women are jurors, Charles Dana Gibson, 1902

The representation of women on United States juries drastically increased during the last hundred years because of legislation and court rulings. Until the latter part of the twentieth century, women were routinely excluded from jury service. The push for women's jury rights sparked a debate similar to that surrounding the women's suffrage movement. At that time, it filled the media with arguments for and against. Federal and state court case rulings increased women's participation on juries. Some states allowed women to serve on juries much earlier than others, while also differing on whether women's suffrage also implied women's jury service.

== History ==
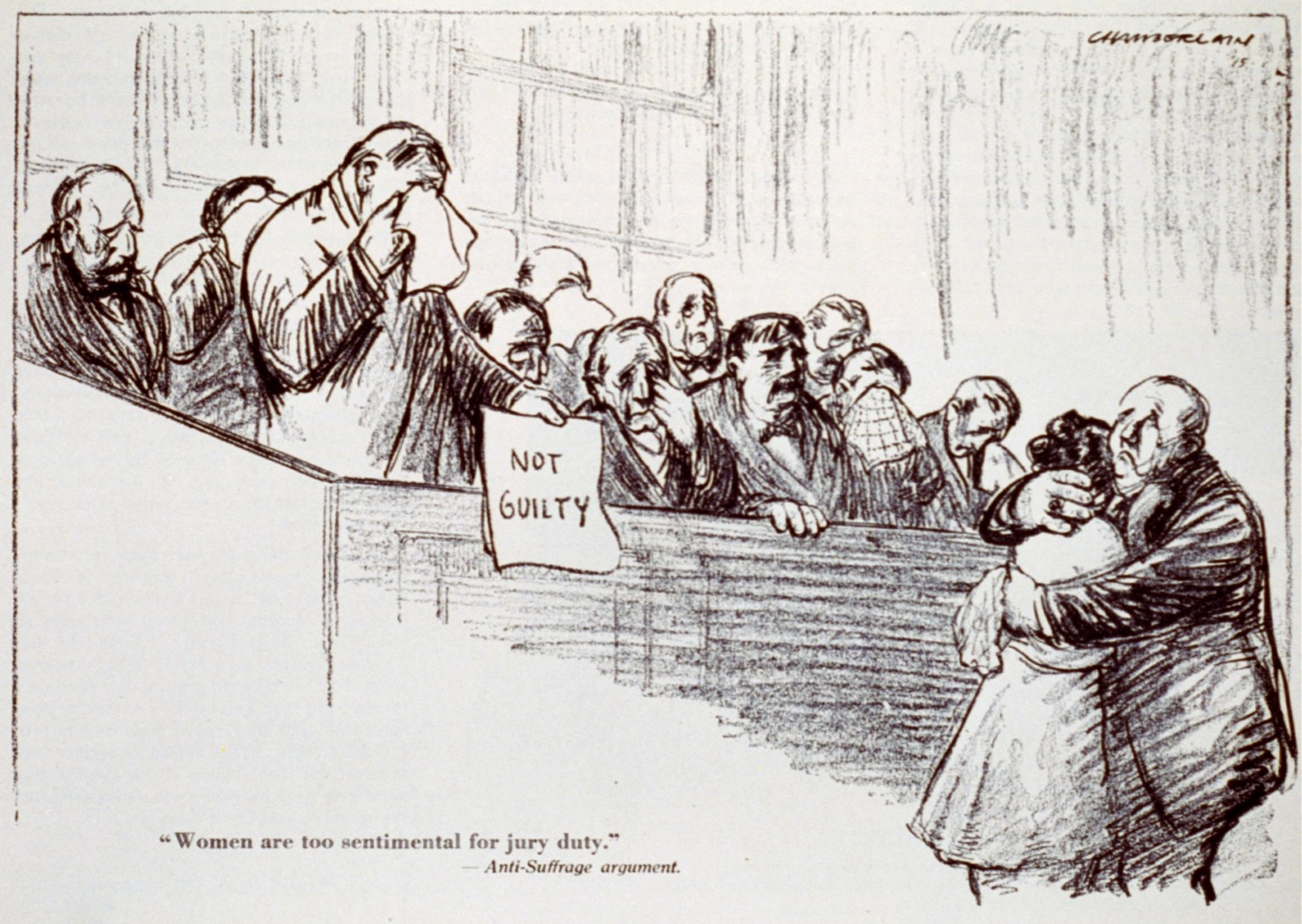
"Women are too sentimental for jury duty" (1915)

The jury of matrons was an early exception to the exclusion of women from juries. Stemming from English common law, matrons in the American colonies were occasionally called upon in cases involving pregnant women to offer expertise on pregnancy and childbirth. William Blackstone spearheaded the idea of women's exclusion as a result of "proper defectum sexus," meaning "based on the defect of sex", and his beliefs were integrated into the legal systems of the United States, including the ideals of coverture. Women's place on the jury would be challenged for decades with arguments including their supposed lack of intelligence, emotional stability, and need to tend to home life. Women would find themselves between two ends of a spectrum: having the full legal right to participate on a jury or barred from participation entirely.

Most arguments for exclusionary policies relied on the belief that women had other preceding duties in the home. The belief that women were too sensitive or incompetent to be jurors was also widespread. Some opponents of female jurors sought to shield women from the unpleasant content of many court cases. These arguments follow a wider trend of arguments used to challenge political participation by minority groups. At a time when women were beginning to assert their sameness with men, the movement for jury rights often required them to emphasize their differences, arguing that men and women were not interchangeable.

The movement to include women on juries largely coincided with the women's suffrage movement. However, when women gained the right to vote, it was not automatically clear that women also had the right to serve on juries. In fact, with federal women's suffrage came many questions about women's citizenship after marrying a foreigner, holding political office, or serving on a jury. The movement for women's jury rights has been described as “something very like a second suffrage campaign.”

As jury trial is guaranteed by the Sixth Amendment to the United States Constitution by the phrase "a speedy and public trial, by an impartial jury" and the Equal Protection Clause in the Fourteenth Amendment, gender representation in American juries has mainly been decided by Supreme Court rulings.

With current state legislation, all-female juries are possible—the jury of the State of Florida v. George Zimmerman got attention for its all-woman composition.

=== Growing acceptance after suffrage ===
When the Great Depression struck the nation in the 1930s, organizations like the Federal Grand Jury Association (FGJA), a voluntary association of present or former grand jurors in the Southern District, began to expand their requirements for those who could serve on juries to retain working men in their positions and have enough jurors serving in the court.

In the 1930s and 1940s, "middle-class women demanded to serve on juries as a right of equal citizenship." At this time, the League of Women Voters and the National Woman's Party demanded the right to be considered for jury duty. Although women had gained the right to vote in 1920, they were not given the same obligation to the state as men in serving on a jury. When they were allowed to participate on juries, the women who desired to serve had to do so through voluntary submission. This narrowed the female pool to middle-class women who were strong activists in the women's movement. In 1937, woman federal jurors won official approval and in some states, including California, Indiana, Iowa, Maine, Minnesota, Michigan, Nebraska, New Jersey, Ohio and Pennsylvania, participation on a jury was compulsory.

Judge John C. Knox advocated for the expansion of the qualifications for jurors and even promoted women to serve on the jury. He argued for the expansion of the juries to be "truly representative of the community"; however, he believed that jurors had to be able to complete a series of tests that proved their literacy and intelligence. He hoped that federal courts would establish a system of "hand-picked juries" that would ultimately be limited to educated, middle-class men. The tests given to potential jurors created rules and regulations that barred the unemployed as well as those who had different clothing, speech patterns, or spelling than what was deemed acceptable to those who ran the screening process.

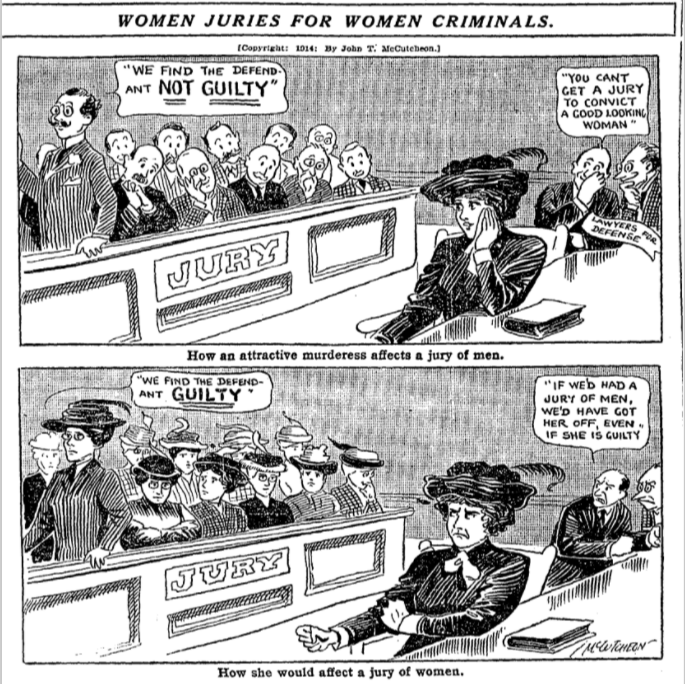
"Women juries for women criminals." (1914)

=== Portrayals of women as jurors ===
The media portrayed female jurors in both positive and negative ways as women throughout the country pushed to gain the right to serve on juries. Many of the same arguments both for and against women's suffrage were used in the case of women's jury service. For example, an argument against both women's suffrage and jury service was that both would be disruptive to women's responsibilities in the home. In addition to this, it was believed that jury duty might not be suitable for women and their perceived "delicate nature." Some media portrayals claimed that women would be swayed by handsome male criminals and allow guilty men to walk free. The opposite argument was that men were already being swayed by the beauty of some female criminals, and that women on juries would temper this occurrence.

Although some states allowed women to participate in juries as soon as they were out of the gate with their ballot, most women found themselves in states where they needed to fight for their right to participate on a jury. In the 1920s, elite white males were the favored samplings of the population to be included on juries. The Federal Grand Jury Association (FGJA) focused its energies on screening jurors, creating a jury pool of middle to upper class white males while excluding those whose race, class, intelligence, or gender seemed "unfit" for service on a jury. Although portrayed as a "mirror of society," juries were biased in their exclusion of minorities, including the female population. In the 1920s, common arguments revolved around the concept of sentiment, and women were stereotyped to be unhelpful on a jury. A 1927 article from the New York Times claims that courts would have to tend to "fainting fits and outbursts of tears" if women were to be included as potential jurors. Furthermore, research from the past shows that the women were typically attributed toward "the tendency to be emotional, submissive, envious and passive," thus creating biased juries.

In the late 1930s, the perspectives on women jurors transitioned from a place of sentiment to one of special competence. Women became "law abiding, attentive to detail, and less likely to be swayed by emotion than men". It was believed that they were better able to see through lies because they had been "sifting truth from falsehood due to their years of dealing with children who try to escape punishment by fibbing." Rather than being seen as overly sensitive and emotional, women began to gain the identity as more "civilized" than men and they were placed on a pedestal of "moral superiority."

=== Court cases ===
Court cases shaped the movement to include women in jury service. Key court cases took gradual steps towards full inclusion of women, first targeting opt-in policies, then opt-out policies, and later peremptory strikes based on gender. The debate often centered around whether jury service was a duty or a privilege of citizenship and whether or not it could be optional.

==== Strauder v. West Virginia (1879) ====
After an African-American man killed his wife and was tried by a jury of all white men, Strauder v. West Virginia was primarily concerned with the exclusion of African Americans from juries. However, while the Supreme Court ruled that excluding African-Americans from juries was unconstitutional, it allowed for the exclusion of women from juries, stating that a state “may confine the selection [of jurors] to males.” The decision in Strauder v. West Virginia was significant because it was one of the first times that the Supreme Court had applied the Equal Protection Clause of the 14th Amendment to strike down a state law that discriminated against African Americans. Strauder v. West Virginia set a precedent that was followed years later in Hoyt v. Florida.

==== Glasser v. United States (1942) ====
Glasser v. United States was one of the first notable cases where the defendants argued that their jury was unconstitutional because women had been excluded from the jury pool. Ultimately, the Supreme Court decided that the all-male jury make-up was acceptable. The phrase “cross-section of the community,” commonly used throughout the rest of the women's jury movement, first appeared in this court case. It reads, “[Officials] must not allow the desire for competent jurors to lead them into selections which do not comport with the concept of the jury as a cross-section of the community.”

==== Hoyt v. Florida (1961) ====
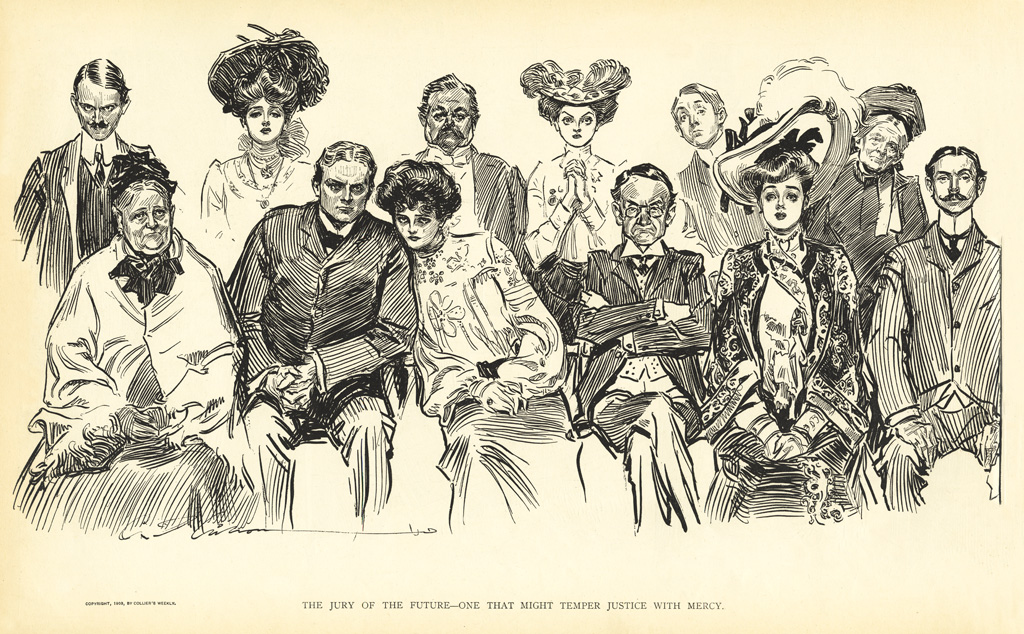
"The jury of the future--One that might temper justice with mercy" (1903)

In Hoyt v. Florida, the Supreme Court upheld Florida's “opt-in” policy for female jurors. Mrs. Gwendolyn Hoyt and her husband Clarence Hoyt spent years in a strained marriage. He was physically abusive to his wife, involved in affairs, and often gone on trips. One day in 1957, a tense conversation led Mrs. Hoyt to strike her husband over the head with a broken baseball bat; he died two days later. She was charged with second-degree murder and, after a 25-minute deliberation by an all-male jury, she was sentenced to thirty years in prison. At the time, women were allowed to serve on juries in Florida, but they had to opt-in to be on the jury list instead of automatically being registered like men. In Hoyt's county, only 220 women were registered for jury service, whereas 68,000 men were registered to vote. Hoyt argued that she did not receive a trial by an impartial jury due to this opt-in policy, but she lost the case. The logic behind the ruling relied on the assumption that jury service was a burden to women, rather than a responsibility or a privilege. The court allowed universal exemption of women from jury service so women could attend to their duties in the home.

==== Healy v. Edwards (1973) ====
Although not a Supreme Court case, Healy v. Edwards, fought in the U.S. District Court for the Eastern District of Louisiana, was among the first to oppose previous rulings of Strauder v. West Virginia and Hoyt v. Florida. Ruth Bader Ginsburg served as the attorney representing Marsha Healy in opposing Louisiana's optional jury service for women. In her statements, Ginsburg expanded the plaintiffs to include three groups: women like Healy whose citizenship was diminished by making citizenship duties optional, women defendants who were denied the right to a jury of their peers by not having women on their jury, and men who had to be called in more often for jury duty because women weren't required to. Ginsburg argued that “a flavor, a distinct quality is lost if either sex is excluded.”

==== Taylor v. Louisiana (1975) ====
Taylor v. Louisiana’s ruling was similar to Healy v. Edwards, but it was fought in the Supreme Court so it overturned Hoyt v. Florida. Billy Taylor kidnapped and robbed a woman, her daughter, and her grandson and raped the woman. Louisiana had an “opt-in” policy similar to Florida's. Taylor's jury was called from a pool of all men, which, like Hoyt, Taylor argued violated his right to an impartial jury. Opposing attorneys argued that Taylor didn't have a right to this argument because he wasn't a part of the excluded minority—he wasn't a woman. However, the judge rejected this argument and ruled in favor of Taylor, stating that every defendant deserved a jury from a fair cross section of his peers. Taylor v. Louisiana largely takes its argument from the 1946 Supreme Court case Ballard v. United States. Ballard ruled that excluding women from the jury pool didn't make for a fair cross section of the community, but it had little effect because only federal courts were subject to the ruling. In 1968, Duncan v. Louisiana made the Sixth Amendment, the right to an impartial jury, apply to states as well, which political scientist Eric Kasper suggests explains the difference between the rulings in Hoyt v. Florida and Taylor v. Louisiana.

==== Duren v. Missouri (1979) ====
By 1979, many states had “opt-out” jury service policies for women rather than “opt-in” policies, making women eligible for automatic exemption from jury service. Supreme Court case Duren v. Missouri challenged these policies. Ruth Bader Ginsburg served as the challenging attorney. The court produced a three-part test to identify discrimination in jury selection. In order to pass, the jury pool must regularly reflect an accurate proportion of members of a distinct group in the general population—in this case, women. The court ruled that opt-out policies did not meet these criteria and, thus, were unconstitutional.

==== JEB v. Alabama (1994) ====
The Supreme Court case JEB v. Alabama involved a woman who was trying to get child support after her child's father abandoned them. The attorneys used peremptory strikes to eliminate all the male jurors. Following the precedent of Batson v. Kentucky, which banned peremptory strikes based on race, the Supreme Court also banned peremptory strikes based on gender. While previous court decisions relied on the Sixth Amendment and the idea of a jury being a fair cross-section of the community, JEB v. Alabama cited the Equal Protection Clause of the Fourteenth Amendment.

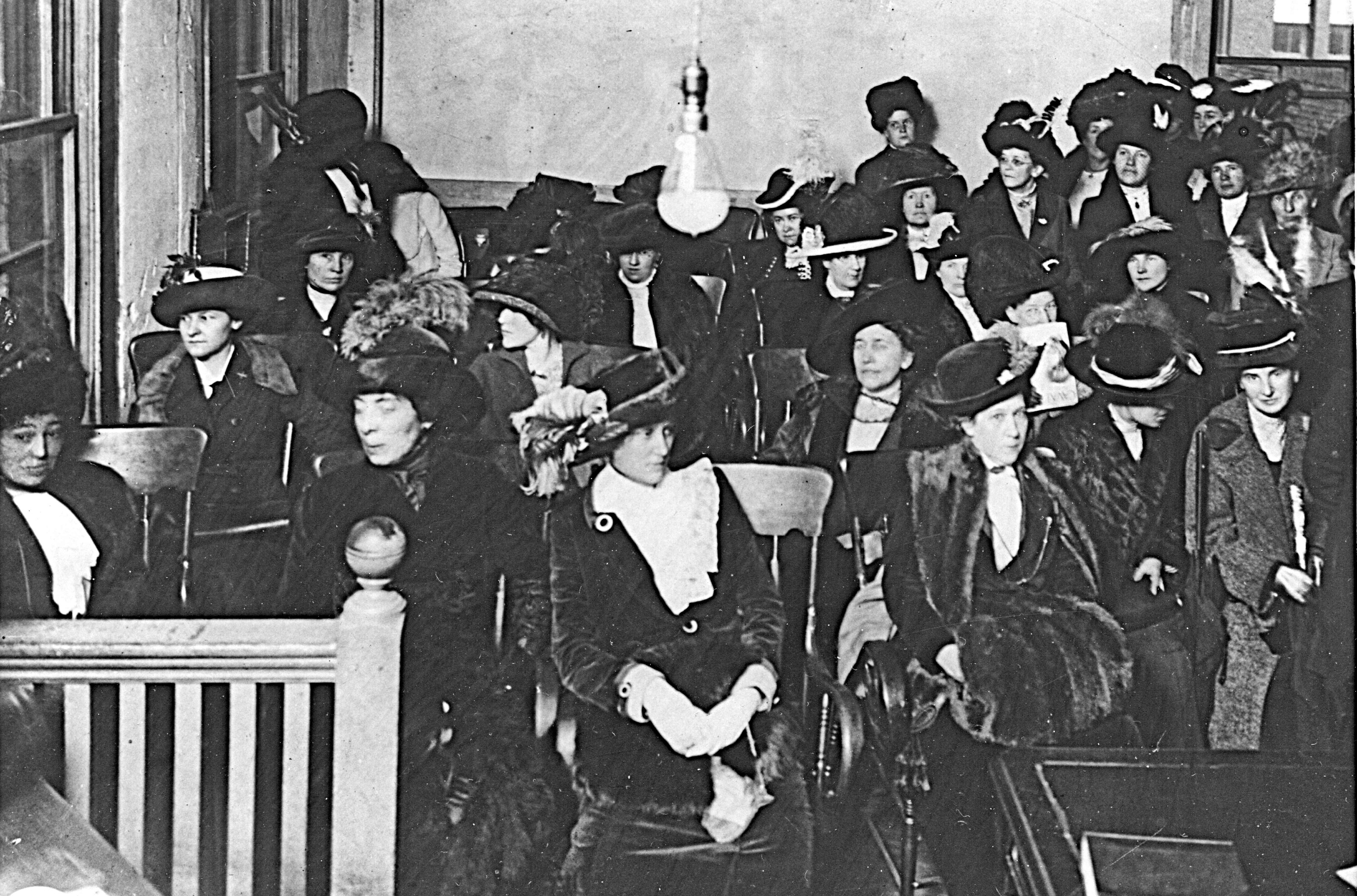
A crowd of women registering for jury duty in Portland, Oregon (1912)

=== Timeline ===
The push for women's jury rights was largely fought for on a state-by-state basis, with each state facing its own unique challenges.

Year women first allowed to serve	State	Notes
1870	Wyoming (territory)	Women in the Wyoming Territory were given the right to vote in 1869, and the Chief Justice of the territory, John H. Howe, assumed that this privilege of citizenship would extend to jury service. As such, Justice Howe saw fit to extend women the rights to sit on a jury in 1870. This was put into action and women served on gender-mixed juries with men for the next year. The first woman to serve on a jury was Eliza Stewart Boyd. Howe claimed that he saw a vast improvement in the jury system after women were included. But once Howe was replaced by his successor in 1871, women were no longer called upon to serve on juries. (1870, 1890–1892)
1883	Washington (territory)	Women in the Washington Territory were granted suffrage in 1883 as well as jury service rights, but both were rescinded in 1887 due to a change in the territory's Supreme Court.
1898	Utah	The Utah State Legislature granted women permission to serve on juries in 1898, just three years after women were given the right to vote. Even though women were able to serve on juries starting in 1898, women were able to seek exemption from jury duty and they did not regularly serve on juries until the 1930s.
1911	Washington	
1912	Kansas	Following the amendment that granted women suffrage in Kansas, women were permitted to sit on a jury.
	Oregon	
1917	California	
1918	Michigan	
	Nevada	
1920	Delaware	
	Indiana	
	Iowa	
	Kentucky	
	Ohio	
		In 1920, when the Nineteenth Amendment granted women's suffrage, the push for jury rights in the remaining states increased.
1921	Arkansas	
	Maine	
	Minnesota	
	New Jersey	
	North Dakota	
	Pennsylvania	
	Wisconsin	
1923	Alaska (territory)	
1924	Louisiana	
1927	Rhode Island	
	Connecticut	
	New York	
1939	Illinois	
	Montana	
1942	Vermont	
1943	Idaho	
	Nebraska	
1945	Arizona	
	Colorado	
	Missouri	
1947	Maryland	
	New Hampshire	
	North Carolina	
	South Dakota	
1949	Florida	
	Massachusetts	
	Wyoming	
1950	Virginia	
1951	New Mexico	
	Tennessee	
1952	Hawaii	
	Oklahoma	
1953	Georgia	
1955	Texas	
1956	West Virginia	
1966	Alabama	
1967	South Carolina	
1968	Mississippi	On June 15, 1968, The New York Times ran a small column reading “A law making women eligible to serve on state court juries was signed today by Gov. John Bell Williams. Mississippi was the last state in the nation to take the step.”

== Women's jury service today ==
Today, women frequently serve on juries. In many states, specific exemptions are available for people involved in child care. For example, Illinois, Iowa, Kansas, Mississippi, Nebraska, Oklahoma, and Oregon allow exemptions to jury service for nursing mothers.

Robert Burns argues that the decline of the jury trial has been and would be a setback for hard-earned enfranchisement of women and minorities.

== See also ==
- Jury selection in the United States
- Racial discrimination in jury selection
- Women's suffrage
- Women in government
- Juries in the United States
- Citizenship of the United States
