= Duren v. Missouri =

- Supreme Court of the United States

Argued November 1, 1978 Decided January 9, 1979
- Full case name: Duren v. Missouri
- Citations: 439 U.S. 357 (more) 99 S. Ct. 664; 58 L. Ed. 2d 579; 1979 U.S. LEXIS 208

Case history
- Prior: Certiorari to the Supreme Court of Missouri

Holding
- The exemption on request of women from jury service under Missouri law, resulting in an average of less than 15% women on jury venires in the forum county, violates the "fair-cross-section" requirement of the Sixth Amendment as made applicable to the States by the Fourteenth.

Court membership
- Chief Justice Warren E. Burger Associate Justices William J. Brennan Jr. · Potter Stewart; Byron White · Thurgood Marshall; Harry Blackmun · Lewis F. Powell Jr. William Rehnquist · John P. Stevens

Case opinions
- Majority: White, joined by Burger, Brennan, Stewart, Marshall, Blackmun, Powell, Stevens
- Dissent: Rehnquist

Duren v. Missouri, 439 U.S. 357 (1979), was a United States Supreme Court case related to the Sixth Amendment. It challenged Missouri's law allowing gender-based exemption from jury service.

Ruth Bader Ginsburg, who later became a Supreme Court Justice, and Lee Nation argued for Duren in what became Ginsburg's last case before the Supreme Court as an attorney. Part of her argument was that making jury duty optional for women should be struck down because it treated women's service on juries as less valuable than men's, and also discriminated against men who enjoyed no such exemption.

== Background ==
Duren was indicted in 1975 for first-degree murder and first-degree robbery. In a pretrial motion to quash his jury panel, and again in a post-conviction motion for a new trial, he claimed that his right to trial by a jury chosen from a fair cross section of his community was denied by provisions of Missouri law granting women who so request an automatic exemption from jury service. He claimed that this Missouri law violated his Sixth Amendment right to an impartial jury.

== Issues ==
Missouri state law at that time permitted women (and those over age 65) to be exempted from jury duty upon request. Furthermore, women who failed to show up for jury duty were automatically exempted. In Taylor v. Louisiana, the Supreme Court held that systematic exclusion of women from the jury pool resulted in jury pools that were not representative of the general population.

== Decision ==
The conviction was overturned and remanded back to trial court. Five other cases before the Supreme Court were also decided in the same way: Harlin v. Missouri, (439 U.S. 459), Lee v. Missouri, (439 U.S. 461), Arrington v. Missouri, Burnfin v. Missouri, Combs v. Missouri and Minor v. Missouri. The decision was held to be retroactive.
