= Direct estoppel =

The doctrine of direct estoppel prevents a party to litigation from relitigating an issue that was decided against that party. Direct estoppel and collateral estoppel are part of the larger doctrine of issue preclusion. Issue preclusion means that a party cannot litigate the same issue in a subsequent action. Issue preclusion means that a party in a previous proceeding cannot litigate an identical issue that was adjudicated and had the judgment as an integral part of the overall issue.

== Principle ==
Direct estoppel can arise in two scenarios:

1. When a first cause of action is decided on certain grounds and a second cause of action precludes a party from making an argument based on the decided first cause of action.
2. When a court rules on some causes of action, direct estoppel precludes issues that are common to the causes of actions decided and the ones not decided by the court.

Restatement (First) of Judgments § 45 explains that direct estoppel occurs when:

an issue is actually litigated and determined in an action, the determination is conclusive in any subsequent action between the parties based upon the same cause of action ... The term "direct estoppel" is used in the Restatement of this Subject to indicate that the binding effect of a judgment as to matters actually litigated and determined in one action applies to a subsequent action between the parties based upon the same cause of action, where the plaintiff is not precluded from maintaining such an action by the extinguishment of his cause of action under the rules as to merger and bar.

Direct estoppel arises when a claim is adjudicated and a party wants to litigate the same issue. Direct estoppel also prevents untried claims dismissed on pre-trial motions from being litigated in an appeal. The "party seeking to invoke direct estoppel must show that:

1. the issue sought to be precluded was raised and litigated in a previous proceeding,
2. the determination of the issue was a critical and necessary part of the final judgment in a prior trial, and
3. the issue is the same one decided in the previous trial."

The goal of direct estoppel is to prevent a party from litigating the same cause of action or motion without having new legal or factual issues. Direct estoppel is a judicial procedure instrument that "provide[s] a minimum level of preclusion below which the federal procedural system may not fall without running afoul of the Reexamination Clause." The court will not allow a party to bring an action if the issue raised was heard and a court adjudicated it either in a pre-trial motion or during trial.

=== Contrast with collateral estoppel ===
Collateral estoppel is a doctrine that precludes a party from bringing an issue if a determination of law or fact was already made. In a criminal case, a defendant cannot face the same charge in more than one criminal trial. In a civil case, a party cannot re-litigate an issue decided on the merits in a previous action.

== Case law ==
=== Peare v. Griggs, 8 N.Y.2d 44, (1960) ===
The courts have used direct estoppel to prevent a party from bringing the same cause of action several times. For example, in Peare v. Griggss, the appellate court reversed a judgment awarded to a widow-plaintiff because the direct estoppel doctrine prevented the plaintiff from receiving damages arising out of the same controversy. The court explained that the widow could not litigate a property damage action in one state and a wrongful death action in another state when both actions arose out of the same facts. As an administratrix of her deceased husband, the widow initiated a property damage action in Virginia because the accident that killed her husband involved a car owned by her. After the widow was unable to obtain damages in Virginia, she commenced a new action in NY for wrongful death. The trial court awarded the widow damages; however, the appellate court reversed. The appellate court explained that even though the cause of actions were filled in different states, they were based on the same facts and there was a common element, the negligence of the deceased husband of the plaintiff. Ultimately, this case is an example that direct estoppel halts plaintiffs who had their day in court from litigating the same case.

=== Halpern v. Schwartz, 426 F.2d 102, (1970) ===
The courts have also held that direct estoppel will not prevent a party from litigation an issue that was not adjudicated in a previous cause action if the courts decided the case on several grounds. In Halpern v. Schwartz, the court determined that when a judgment that was based on several and independent grounds, the cause of action can be reconsider for one of the grounds or issues that were not fundamental to the final judgment. The appellant, Halpern asked the court to review the District Court decision that affirmed the bankruptcy court's holding. Halpern opposed the bankruptcy court decision of declaring Schwartz bankrupt. Halpern claimed that Schwartz had transferred valuable bonds and mortgages to her son with the goal to defraud her creditors. The court ultimately held that when a prior judgment was passed on three independent grounds, collateral estoppel could not give effect to the bankruptcy proceedings. The court ruling reflects the idea that if a judge based a decision on three independent grounds, each of the three grounds may not obtain the same careful attention that they deserve and a party is entitled to full adjudication.

=== United States v. Shenberg, 828 F. Supp. 968 (1993) ===
Direct estoppel can be a tool for defendants to prevent the government from using counts decided already to support a different prosecution. In United States v. Shenberg, the defendants faced 55 counts and after trial, they were convicted of 3 counts only. Subsequently, the prosecutors wanted to use the acquitted counts to support a different prosecution. Ultimately, the court held that direct estoppel prevented the prosecution from issuing the counts already adjudicated to prove different counts. The importance of this decision is that the court held that "direct estoppel applies to a continuing prosecution even if double jeopardy and collateral estoppel do not." Therefore, once a jury partially acquits a defendant, the acquitted counts cannot be brought again in a continuing prosecution.

The principle of direct estoppel can also prevent a court from reconsidering a motion that was denied against a defendant. For example, in Massachusetts, a defendant appealed to the Massachusetts court the decision of the appellate court of denying his motion to reduce the verdict against him. The Supreme Court of Massachusetts held that direct estoppel prevented the court from ruling on a motion that was decided by the lower court. The decision of the court exemplifies that direct estoppel can prevent a party from bringing the same claim regardless of the procedural vehicle used.

== See also ==
- Res judicata
