= Parklane Hosiery Co. v. Shore =

- Supreme Court of the United States

Decided January 9, 1979
- Full case name: Parklane Hosiery Co. v. Shore
- Citations: 439 U.S. 322 (more)

Holding
- Nonmutual offensive issue preclusion is available in federal courts, but only if it would be fair.

Court membership
- Chief Justice Warren E. Burger Associate Justices William J. Brennan Jr. · Potter Stewart; Byron White · Thurgood Marshall; Harry Blackmun · Lewis F. Powell Jr. William Rehnquist · John P. Stevens

Case opinions
- Majority: Stewart
- Dissent: Rehnquist

Parklane Hosiery Co. v. Shore, 439 U.S. 322 (1979), was a United States Supreme Court case in which the court held that nonmutual offensive issue preclusion is available in federal court, but only if it would be fair. In this case, a party who had a "full and fair" opportunity to litigate their claims in an earlier action were collaterally estopped from relitigating them in this case. Although later interpretation of this holding has described it as "cryptic", the basic rule is that a party who had a clear opportunity to join an opponent to an earlier action and refused that opportunity does not get to use the finding of that earlier action against their opponent now. In this case, Shore could have joined the earlier SEC action through intervention.

== Background ==
Shore brought a stockholder's class action in the federal District Court for damages and other relief against the Parklane Hosiery corporation and its directors, who allegedly had issued a materially false and misleading proxy statement in violation of the federal securities laws and Securities and Exchange Commission (SEC) regulations. Before the action came to trial, the SEC sued the same defendants in the District Court alleging that the proxy statement was materially false and misleading in essentially the same respects as respondent had claimed. The District Court, after a nonjury trial, entered a declaratory judgment for the SEC, and the Second Circuit Court of Appeals affirmed. Shore in this case then moved for partial summary judgment against Parklane, asserting that they were collaterally estopped from relitigating the issues that had been resolved against them in the SEC suit. The District Court denied the motion on the ground that such an application of collateral estoppel would deny Parklane their Seventh Amendment right to a jury trial. The Second Circuit Court of Appeals reversed.

== Opinion of the court ==
The Supreme Court issued an opinion on January 9, 1979.
