= List of United States Supreme Court cases, volume 439 =

This is a list of all the United States Supreme Court cases from volume 439 of the United States Reports:

| Case name | Citation | Date decided |
|---|---|---|
| Long Island R.R. Co. v. Aberdeen & Rockfish R.R. Co. | 439 U.S. 1 | 1978 |
| Carey v. Wynn | 439 U.S. 8 | 1978 |
| NLRB v. Baylor Univ. | 439 U.S. 9 | 1978 |
| Presnell v. Georgia | 439 U.S. 14 | 1978 |
| Keene State Coll. v. Sweeney | 439 U.S. 24 | 1978 |
| United States v. California | 439 U.S. 30 | 1978 |
| Dougherty Cnty. Bd. of Educ. v. White | 439 U.S. 32 | 1978 |
| Holt Civic Club v. City of Tuscaloosa | 439 U.S. 60 | 1978 |
| Union Pac. R.R. Co. v. Sheehan | 439 U.S. 89 | 1978 |
| New Motor Vehicle Bd. v. Orrin W. Fox Co. | 439 U.S. 96 | 1978 |
| Rakas v. Illinois | 439 U.S. 128 | 1978 |
| Califano v. Aznavorian | 439 U.S. 170 | 1978 |
| United Cal. Bank v. United States | 439 U.S. 180 | 1978 |
| Corbitt v. New Jersey | 439 U.S. 212 | 1978 |
| FRS v. First Lincolnwood Corp. | 439 U.S. 234 | 1978 |
| Lalli v. Lalli | 439 U.S. 259 | 1978 |
| Massachusetts v. White | 439 U.S. 280 | 1978 |
| Hunter v. Dean | 439 U.S. 281 | 1978 |
| Michigan v. Doran | 439 U.S. 282 | 1978 |
| Marquette Nat'l Bank v. First of Omaha Serv. Corp. | 439 U.S. 299 | 1978 |
| Mobay Chem. Corp. v. Costle | 439 U.S. 320 | 1979 |
| Parklane Hosiery Co. v. Shore | 439 U.S. 322 | 1979 |
| Duren v. Missouri | 439 U.S. 357 | 1979 |
| Colautti v. Franklin | 439 U.S. 379 | 1979 |
| Givhan v. W. Line Consol. Sch. Dist. | 439 U.S. 410 | 1979 |
| Arizona v. California | 439 U.S. 419 | 1979 |
| Leis v. Flynt | 439 U.S. 438 | 1979 |
| Harlin v. Missouri | 439 U.S. 459 | 1979 |
| Lee v. Missouri | 439 U.S. 461 | 1979 |
| Washington v. Yakima Nation | 439 U.S. 463 | 1979 |
| FERC v. Pennzoil Producing Co. | 439 U.S. 508 | 1979 |
| Thor Power Tool Co. v. Comm'r | 439 U.S. 522 | 1979 |
| Teamsters v. Daniel | 439 U.S. 551 | 1979 |
| Hisquierdo v. Hisquierdo | 439 U.S. 572 | 1979 |
| N.Y. Times Co. v. Jascalevich I | 439 U.S. 1301 | 1978 |
| N.Y. Times Co. v. Jascalevich II | 439 U.S. 1304 | 1978 |
| Reproductive Serv., Inc. v. Walker | 439 U.S. 1307 | 1978 |
| Fare v. Michael C. | 439 U.S. 1310 | 1978 |
| N.Y. Times Co. v. Jascalevich III | 439 U.S. 1317 | 1978 |
| Truong Dinh Hung v. United States | 439 U.S. 1326 | 1978 |
| N.Y. Times Co. v. Jascalevich IV | 439 U.S. 1331 | 1978 |
| Miroyan v. United States | 439 U.S. 1338 | 1978 |
| Brennan v. Postal Serv. | 439 U.S. 1345 | 1978 |
| Columbus Bd. of Educ. v. Penick | 439 U.S. 1348 | 1978 |
| Reproductive Serv., Inc. v. Walker | 439 U.S. 1354 | 1978 |
| United Methodist Ch. v. Super. Ct. I | 439 U.S. 1355 | 1978 |
| Dayton Bd. of Educ. v. Brinkman I | 439 U.S. 1357 | 1978 |
| Dayton Bd. of Educ. v. Brinkman II | 439 U.S. 1358 | 1978 |
| Buchanan v. Evans | 439 U.S. 1360 | 1978 |
| Divans v. California | 439 U.S. 1367 | 1978 |
| United Methodist Ch. v. Super. Ct. II | 439 U.S. 1369 | 1978 |
| du Pont School Dist. v. Evans | 439 U.S. 1375 | 1978 |
| Bustop, Inc. v. L.A. Bd. of Educ. I | 439 U.S. 1380 | 1978 |
| Bustop, Inc. v. L.A. Bd. of Educ. II | 439 U.S. 1384 | 1978 |
| Kimble v. Swackhamer | 439 U.S. 1385 | 1978 |
| City of Boston v. Anderson | 439 U.S. 1389 | 1978 |
| Warm Springs Dam Task Force v. Gribble | 439 U.S. 1392 | 1978 |
| Dolman v. United States | 439 U.S. 1395 | 1978 |
