= Garner v. Louisiana =

- Supreme Court of the United States

Argued October 18–19, 1961 Decided December 11, 1961
- Full case name: John Burrell Garner, et al. v. State of Louisiana, Mary Briscoe, et al.
- Citations: 368 U.S. 157 (more) 82 S. Ct. 248; 7 L. Ed. 2d 207; 1961 U.S. LEXIS 28

Case history
- Prior: Certiorari to the Supreme Court of Louisiana, 365 U.S. 840 (1961).

Holding
- The convictions were so totally devoid of evidentiary support as to violate the Due Process Clause of the Fourteenth Amendment.

Court membership
- Chief Justice Earl Warren Associate Justices Hugo Black · Felix Frankfurter; William O. Douglas · Tom C. Clark; John M. Harlan II · William J. Brennan Jr. Charles E. Whittaker · Potter Stewart

Case opinions
- Majority: Warren, joined by unanimous
- Concurrence: Frankfurter
- Concurrence: Douglas
- Concurrence: Harlan

Laws applied
- U.S. Const. amends. I, XIV

Garner v. Louisiana, 368 U.S. 157 (1961), is a landmark case argued by Thurgood Marshall before the US Supreme Court. On December 11, 1961, the court unanimously ruled that Louisiana could not convict peaceful sit-in protesters who refused to leave dining establishments under the state's "disturbing the peace" laws.

== Background ==
African-American students from Southern University sat at a whites-only segregated lunch bar at Sitman's Drugstore in Baton Rouge, Louisiana. The management summoned the police after the students quietly remained despite being asked to relocate to another counter.

After ordering the black patrons to leave, the police arrested them, charged them with disturbing the peace, and claimed that their behavior could "foreseeably disturb or alarm the public," according to the state's "disturbing the peace" statute.

The National Association for the Advancement of Colored People defended the student demonstrators, and the Kennedy administration's Justice Department filed a legal brief on their behalf.

== Decision ==
In a 9–0 decision, the Supreme Court ruled in the African-American students' favor, agreeing that the state had violated due process of law under the Fourteenth amendment, and found no evidence that the students' behavior could have foreseeably disturbed the peace.

In his written opinion, Justice John Marshall Harlan likened sit-in demonstrations to verbal expression as a form of free speech.

Justice William O. Douglas's concurring opinion stated, “For the police are supposed to be on the side of the Constitution, not on the side of discrimination. Yet if all constitutional questions are to be put aside and the problem treated merely in terms of disturbing the peace, I would have difficulty in reversing these judgments. I think, however, the constitutional questions must be reached and that they make reversal necessary.”

Garner v. Louisiana was an important case for the Civil Rights Movement, and one of many civil rights cases argued before the Warren Court (1953–69). Eventually, the Civil Rights Act of 1964 "outlawed discrimination based on race, color, religion or national origin in hotels, motels, restaurants, theaters, and all other public accommodations engaged in interstate commerce."
