= Colautti v. Franklin =

- Supreme Court of the United States

Argued October 3, 1978 Decided January 9, 1979
- Full case name: Colautti, Secretary of Welfare of Pennsylvania, et al. v. Franklin, et al.
- Citations: 439 U.S. 379 (more) 99 S. Ct. 675; 58 L. Ed. 2d 596

Holding
- A viability-determination section of a Pennsylvania abortion statute is void for vagueness

Court membership
- Chief Justice Warren E. Burger Associate Justices William J. Brennan Jr. · Potter Stewart; Byron White · Thurgood Marshall; Harry Blackmun · Lewis F. Powell Jr. William Rehnquist · John P. Stevens

Case opinions
- Majority: Blackmun, joined by Brennan, Stewart, Marshall, Powell, Stevens
- Dissent: White, joined by Burger, Rehnquist
- Superseded by
- Dobbs v. Jackson Women's Health Organization (2022)

Colautti v. Franklin, 439 U.S. 379 (1979), was a United States Supreme Court abortion rights case, which held void for vagueness part of Pennsylvania's 1974 Abortion Control Act. The section in question was the following:

(a) Every person who performs or induces an abortion shall prior thereto have made a determination based on his experience, judgment or professional competence that the fetus is not viable, and if the determination is that the fetus is viable or if there is sufficient reason to believe that the fetus may be viable, shall exercise that degree of professional skill, care and diligence to preserve the life and health of the fetus which such person would be required to exercise in order to preserve the life and health of any fetus intended to be born and not aborted and the abortion technique employed shall be that which would provide the best opportunity for the fetus to be aborted alive so long as a different technique would not be necessary in order to preserve the life or health of the mother.

Doctors who failed to adhere to the provisions of this section were liable to civil and criminal prosecution "as would pertain to him had the fetus been a child who was intended to be born and not aborted." Franklin and others sued, arguing that the provision was both vague and overbroad. In a 6–3 decision written by Roe author Harry Blackmun, the Supreme Court agreed, finding that requiring a determination "if... the fetus is viable or if there is sufficient reason to believe the fetus may be viable" was insufficient and impermissibly vague guidance for physicians who might face criminal liability if a jury disagrees with their judgment.

== See also ==
- List of United States Supreme Court cases, volume 439
- Planned Parenthood of Central Missouri v. Danforth (1976), upholding a viability-related statute against allegations of vagueness.
- City of Akron v. Akron Center for Reproductive Health (1983), struck down an abortion restriction on grounds of unconstitutional vagueness
