= Hoyt v. Florida =

- Supreme Court of the United States

Argued October 19, 1961 Decided November 20, 1961
- Full case name: Gwendolyn Hoyt v. Florida
- Citations: 368 U.S. 57 (more) 82 S. Ct. 159; 7 L. Ed. 2d 118; 1961 U.S. LEXIS 136

Case history
- Prior: Appeal from the Supreme Court of Florida

Holding
- The Florida jury service is constitutional

Court membership
- Chief Justice Earl Warren Associate Justices Hugo Black · Felix Frankfurter; William O. Douglas · Tom C. Clark; John M. Harlan II · William J. Brennan Jr. Charles E. Whittaker · Potter Stewart

Case opinions
- Majority: Harlan, joined by unanimous
- Concurrence: Warren, joined by Black and Douglas
- Overruled by
- Taylor v. Louisiana (1975)

Hoyt v. Florida, 368 U.S. 57 (1961), was an appeal by Gwendolyn Hoyt, who had killed her husband and received a prison sentence for second degree murder. Although she had suffered mental and physical abuse in her marriage and showed neurotic, if not psychotic, behavior, a six-man jury deliberated for just 25 minutes before finding her guilty. They sentenced her to 30 years of hard labor. Hoyt claimed that her all-male jury led to discrimination and unfair circumstances during her trial. The decision was subsequently overruled by Taylor v. Louisiana in 1975.

== Background ==
Florida state law did not require women to serve on juries, unless they volunteered to do so. Most women in the state of Florida did not register, so they were exempted from jury services. The arguments put forward by the plaintiff suggested that there had been jury discrimination, and, moreover, that the Florida statute actively seeks to keep women from serving. This would be known as "the continuing validity". The continuing validity was jury slang for supporting the right to keep males as the primary, and only source, of jurors on these trials. This was argued in that women were excluded solely due to their sex. Men were automatically registered for duty, even if they had submitted an argument against serving. Women, however, had to actively register if they wished to serve. These women were merely recognized for their job of being "the center of home and family" and not in the courtroom.

== Decision ==
In a unanimous opinion written by Justice John Marshall Harlan II, the Supreme Court of the United States held the Florida jury selection statute was not discriminatory. Harlan based his conclusion upon the theory of "reasonable classification," which permits states to choose whom to include and exclude in jury selections. In oral arguments, it was noted that at the time, 17 other states also exempted women from jury duty unless they so chose to register and that at least, in this case, the jury was not selected unconstitutionally. The "practice of excluding women from the jury pool... it reasoned" was done to protect women "from the filth, obscenity, and obnoxious atmosphere... of the courtroom." Harlan held the right to an impartially-selected jury assured by the Fourteenth Amendment does not entitle one accused of crime to a jury tailored to the circumstances of the particular case; it requires only for the jury to be indiscriminately drawn from among those in the community eligible for jury service, irrespective of any arbitrary and systematic exclusions. Furthermore, Harlan held the Florida statute was not unconstitutional on its face since it was not constitutionally impermissible for a state to conclude that a woman should be relieved from jury service unless she herself determines that such service is consistent with her own special responsibilities. Harlan noted that the statute was based on a reasonable classification and so was constitutional. Because women were "still regarded as the center of home and family life," Harlan found that the states could relieve them from the civic responsibility of jury duty unless they themselves determined that such service was consistent with their own "special responsibilities." He also held that the case was distinct from other cases involving racial discrimination in jury selection and that male-female disproportions on jury lists carried no constitutional significance.

== In popular culture ==
The movie On the Basis of Sex covers the Hoyt v. Florida case when Ruth Bader Ginsburg is teaching "Sex Discrimination and the Law". Ginsburg concludes her lesson by telling her students that this case showed "Discrimination on the basis of sex is legal."

== See also ==
- List of United States Supreme Court cases, volume 368
- Women in United States juries
