= List of United States Supreme Court cases, volume 368 =

This is a list of all the United States Supreme Court cases from volume 368 of the United States Reports:

Case name	Citation	Date decided
Hubbard v. Board of Ed.	368 U.S. 1	1961
Johnson v. District Ct.	368 U.S. 1	1961
Soergel v. Allen	368 U.S. 2	1961
Spencer v. Hibernia Bank	368 U.S. 2	1961
Security-First Nat'l Bank v. Franchise Tax Bd.	368 U.S. 3	1961
Abelman v. City of Cedar Rapids	368 U.S. 3	1961
Standard Drug Co. v. General Elec. Co.	368 U.S. 4	1961
Cruz v. Colorado	368 U.S. 4	1961
Milk Transport, Inc. v. United States	368 U.S. 5	1961
Lynn v. McElroy	368 U.S. 5	1961
Dillner Transfer Co. v. United States	368 U.S. 6	1961
Genco v. Genco	368 U.S. 6	1961
Goslin v. Beazley	368 U.S. 7	1961
McMahon v. Milam Mfg. Co.	368 U.S. 7	1961
Oregon ex rel. Smith v. Gladden	368 U.S. 8	1961
Hamilton v. Superior Ct.	368 U.S. 8	1961
Cepero v. Rincon de Gautier	368 U.S. 9	1961
Cepero v. Puerto Rico	368 U.S. 9	1961
Longoria v. Delaware	368 U.S. 10	1961
McLain v. California	368 U.S. 10	1961
Gremillion v. United States	368 U.S. 11	1961
Riley v. Pennsylvania Reading Seashore Lines	368 U.S. 11	1961
Roosevelt Raceway, Inc. v. Monaghan	368 U.S. 12	1961
Castle v. United States	368 U.S. 13	1961
Goodman v. United States	368 U.S. 14	1961
Chobot v. Wisconsin	368 U.S. 15	1961
Katz v. Singerman	368 U.S. 15	1961
NAACP v. Gallion	368 U.S. 16	1961
American Chicle Co. v. State Tax Comm'n	368 U.S. 17	1961
Tinsley v. Richmond	368 U.S. 18	1961
Anderson v. Ball	368 U.S. 18	1961
DeGregory v. Attorney Gen.	368 U.S. 19	1961
Roper v. United States	368 U.S. 20	1961
Martin v. Walton	368 U.S. 25	1961
Department of Revenue v. United States	368 U.S. 30	1961
Cummings v. Huiskamp	368 U.S. 30	1961
Pepe v. Delaware	368 U.S. 31	1961
Ponca Wholesale Mercantile Co. v. Rocky Mountain Wholesale Co.	368 U.S. 31	1961
Schroeder v. Williams	368 U.S. 32	1961
Murphy v. Waterfront Comm'n	368 U.S. 32	1961
Twentieth Century-Fox Film Corp. v. Gerosa	368 U.S. 33	1961
Owens v. Ellis	368 U.S. 33	1961
Winkle v. Bannan	368 U.S. 34	1961
Coates v. Walters	368 U.S. 34	1961
Still v. Norfolk & W.R. Co.	368 U.S. 35	1961
Hamilton v. Alabama (1961)	368 U.S. 52	1961
Oxenberg v. Alaska	368 U.S. 56	1961
Hoyt v. Florida	368 U.S. 57	1961
McLemore v. Mississippi	368 U.S. 70	1961
Fruhling v. Amalgamated Housing Corp.	368 U.S. 70	1961
Western Union Tel. Co. v. Pennsylvania	368 U.S. 71	1961
ICC v. J-T Transp. Co.	368 U.S. 81	1961
Hodges v. United States	368 U.S. 139	1961
Union Cartage Co. v. United States	368 U.S. 143	1961
Linnabery v. Iowa	368 U.S. 143	1961
Bowne v. Utah	368 U.S. 144	1961
Post v. Boles	368 U.S. 144	1961
Johnson v. New Jersey	368 U.S. 145	1961
Federal Land Bank v. Board of Comm'rs	368 U.S. 146	1961
Garner v. Louisiana	368 U.S. 157	1961
St. Regis Paper Co. v. United States	368 U.S. 208	1961
Killian v. United States	368 U.S. 231	1961
Cramp v. Board of Pub. Instruction	368 U.S. 278	1961
A statute requiring every state employee to swear in writing that they have never lent their "aid, support, advice, counsel or influence to the Communist Party" violates their rights under the Due Process Clause of the Fourteenth Amendment.
Lenoir Fin. Co. v. Johnson	368 U.S. 289	1961
Herron v. Portland Stages, Inc.	368 U.S. 289	1961
Staten Island Mental Health Soc'y, Inc. v. Soc'y for Prevention of Cruelty to Children	368 U.S. 290	1961
United States v. Union Cent. Life Ins. Co.	368 U.S. 291	1961
Campbell v. Hussey	368 U.S. 297	1961
NLRB v. Ochoa Fertilizer Corp.	368 U.S. 318	1961
A.L. Mechling Barge Lines, Inc. v. United States	368 U.S. 324	1961
Turnbow v. Commissioner	368 U.S. 337	1961
Venus v. United States	368 U.S. 345	1961
Dutton v. Tawes	368 U.S. 345	1961
Bailey v. Patterson	368 U.S. 346	1961
Crest Fin. Co. v. United States	368 U.S. 347	1961
Morehouse v. United States	368 U.S. 348	1961
Rafter v. Hays	368 U.S. 348	1961
New York C.R.R. Co. v. United States	368 U.S. 349	1962
Save Way N. Boulevard, Inc. v. New York	368 U.S. 349	1962
Bonner v. City of Indianapolis	368 U.S. 350	1962
Seymour v. Superintendent	368 U.S. 351	1962
FTC v. Henry Broch & Co.	368 U.S. 360	1962
United States v. Drum	368 U.S. 370	1962
NLRB v. Brandman Iron Co.	368 U.S. 399	1962
NLRB v. Las Vegas Sand & Gravel Corp.	368 U.S. 400	1962
NLRB v. Plumbers	368 U.S. 401	1962
Hodge v. Iowa	368 U.S. 402	1962
Blau v. Lehman	368 U.S. 403	1962
Hill v. United States	368 U.S. 424	1962
Nostrand v. Little	368 U.S. 436	1962
Mitchell v. United States (1962)	368 U.S. 439	1962
Chewning v. Cunningham	368 U.S. 443	1962
Oyler v. Boles	368 U.S. 448	1962
Poller v. CBS	368 U.S. 464	1962
Machibroda v. United States	368 U.S. 487	1962
Charles Dowd Box Co. v. Courtney	368 U.S. 502	1962
St. Helena Parish Sch. Bd. v. Hall	368 U.S. 515	1962
Johnson v. Horton	368 U.S. 515	1962
Kavanagh v. Stenhouse	368 U.S. 516	1962
Rainsberger v. Leypoldt	368 U.S. 516	1962
In re Kelley	368 U.S. 517	1962
Quinton v. Matthews	368 U.S. 517	1962
Shapiro v. Josephson	368 U.S. 517	1962
