= Oyler v. Boles =

- Supreme Court of the United States

Argued December 4, 1961 Decided February 19, 1962
- Full case name: Oyler v. Boles, Warden
- Citations: 368 U.S. 448 (more) 82 S. Ct. 501; 7 L. Ed. 2d 446; 1962 U.S. LEXIS 1770

Case history
- Prior: Certiorari to the Supreme Court of Appeals of West Virginia

Holding
- Due process does not require advance notice that the trial on the substantive offense will be followed by a habitual criminal accusation, but it does require a reasonable opportunity to defend against such an accusation; failure to proceed against other offenders because of a lack of knowledge of prior offenses or because of the exercise of reasonable selectivity in enforcement does not deny equal protection to persons who are prosecuted

Court membership
- Chief Justice Earl Warren Associate Justices Hugo Black · Felix Frankfurter; William O. Douglas · Tom C. Clark; John M. Harlan II · William J. Brennan Jr. Charles E. Whittaker · Potter Stewart

Case opinions
- Majority: Clark, joined by Frankfurter, Harlan, Whittaker, Stewart
- Concurrence: Harlan
- Dissent: Douglas, joined by Warren, Black, Brennan

Laws applied
- U.S. Const. amend. XIV

Oyler v. Boles, 368 U.S. 448 (1962), was a case before the Supreme Court of the United States in which the court held that due process does not require advance notice that the trial on the substantive offense will be followed by a habitual criminal accusation, but it does require a reasonable opportunity to defend against such an accusation.

== Syllabus ==
A West Virginia habitual criminal statute provided for a mandatory life sentence upon the third conviction "of a crime punishable by confinement in a penitentiary." The increased penalty is to be invoked by an information filed by the prosecuting attorney "immediately upon conviction and before sentence." In such proceedings, in which they were represented by counsel and did not request continuances or raise any matters in defense, but did concede the applicability of the statute to the circumstances of their cases, petitioners were sentenced to life imprisonment. Subsequently they petitioned the state supreme court (the Supreme Court of Appeals of West Virginia) for writs of habeas corpus, alleging that the Act had been applied without advance notice and to only a minority of those subject to its provisions, in violation of the Due Process and Equal Protection Clauses of the Fourteenth Amendment. Their petitions were denied by the court.

The Supreme Court held that:

1. Due process does not require advance notice that the trial on the substantive offense will be followed by a habitual criminal accusation. It does require a reasonable opportunity to defend against such an accusation, but the records show that petitioners were not denied such an opportunity (pp. 368 U.S. 451-454).
2. The failure to proceed against other offenders because of a lack of knowledge of prior offenses or because of the exercise of reasonable selectivity in enforcement does not deny equal protection to persons who are prosecuted, and petitioners did not allege that the failure to prosecute others was due to any other reason (pp. 368 U.S. 454-456).

The Supreme Court affirmed, 5-4. Associate Justice Tom C. Clark wrote the opinion of the court, and was joined by Justices Felix Frankfurter, Charles Evans Whittaker, Potter Stewart, and John Marshall Harlan II. Harlan wrote a separate concurring opinion. Justice William O. Douglas wrote the dissenting opinion, joined by Chief Justice Earl Warren and Justices William J. Brennan, Jr. and Hugo Black.
