= De sententia ferenda =

Legal term

De sententia ferenda, Latin for "of judgments as they should be," is a legal term used to depict advice to the courts about how they should judge and refine the analysis about what they really decide.

The concept is similar but not the same as, lex ferenda, which is denoted how the law should be.
