= Seymour v. Superintendent of Washington State Penitentiary =

Seymour v. Superintendent of Wash. State Penitentiary
- Supreme Court of the United States

Argued December 13, 1961 Decided January 15, 1962
- Full case name: Paul Seymour v. Superintendent of Washington State Penitentiary
- Citations: 368 U.S. 351 (more) 82 S. Ct. 424; 7 L. Ed. 2d 346; 1962 U.S. LEXIS 2318

Case history
- Prior: In re Seymour v. Schneckloth, 55 Wash. 2d 109, 346 P.2d 669 (Wash. 1959)

Holding
- The state of Washington did not have jurisdiction to try an Indian for a crime committed within the boundaries of the Colville Indian Reservation, even if the crime was committed on land now owned by a non-Indian.

Court membership
- Chief Justice Earl Warren Associate Justices Hugo Black · Felix Frankfurter; William O. Douglas · Tom C. Clark; John M. Harlan II · William J. Brennan Jr. Charles E. Whittaker · Potter Stewart

Case opinion
- Majority: Black, joined by unanimous

Laws applied
- 18 U.S.C. §§ 1151–1153

Seymour v. Superintendent of Wash. State Penitentiary, 368 U.S. 351 (1962), was a case in which the Supreme Court of the United States that the state of Washington did not have jurisdiction to try an Indian (Native American) for a crime committed within the boundaries of the Colville Indian Reservation, even if the crime was committed on land now owned by a non-Indian.

== Background ==
=== History ===
Paul Seymour was an enrolled member of the Confederated Tribes of the Colville Reservation, a group of twelve Indian tribes that are based at the Colville Indian Reservation. The reservation is located in the western part of Oregon and the eastern part of Washington. The reservation was established by the executive order of President Ulysses S. Grant on 2 July 1872. In 1892, Congress opened up part of the reservation to white settlement. In 1916, President Woodrow Wilson, with Congressional authorization, opened up more reservation land for settlement.

=== Lower courts ===
Seymour was charged with burglary in Okanogan County, Washington and pleaded guilty to attempted burglary. He was sentenced to 7 1/2 years in the state penitentiary. While incarcerated, he filed a petition for a writ of habeas corpus in the Washington Supreme Court. The state Supreme Court denied the petition on the grounds that the offense did not take place in "Indian country". Indian country is defined in federal law as including all land within an Indian reservation, and within Indian country, only the Federal government has jurisdiction over crimes committed by Indians. The court reasoned that the Congressional action that had opened the Colville Indian Reservation to settlement had reduced or diminished the size of the reservation and since the crime was committed outside of the diminished reservation, it was not in Indian country. The court denied the writ. Seymour then appealed to the United States Supreme Court, which agreed to hear the appeal and granted a writ of certiorari.

== Opinion of the court ==
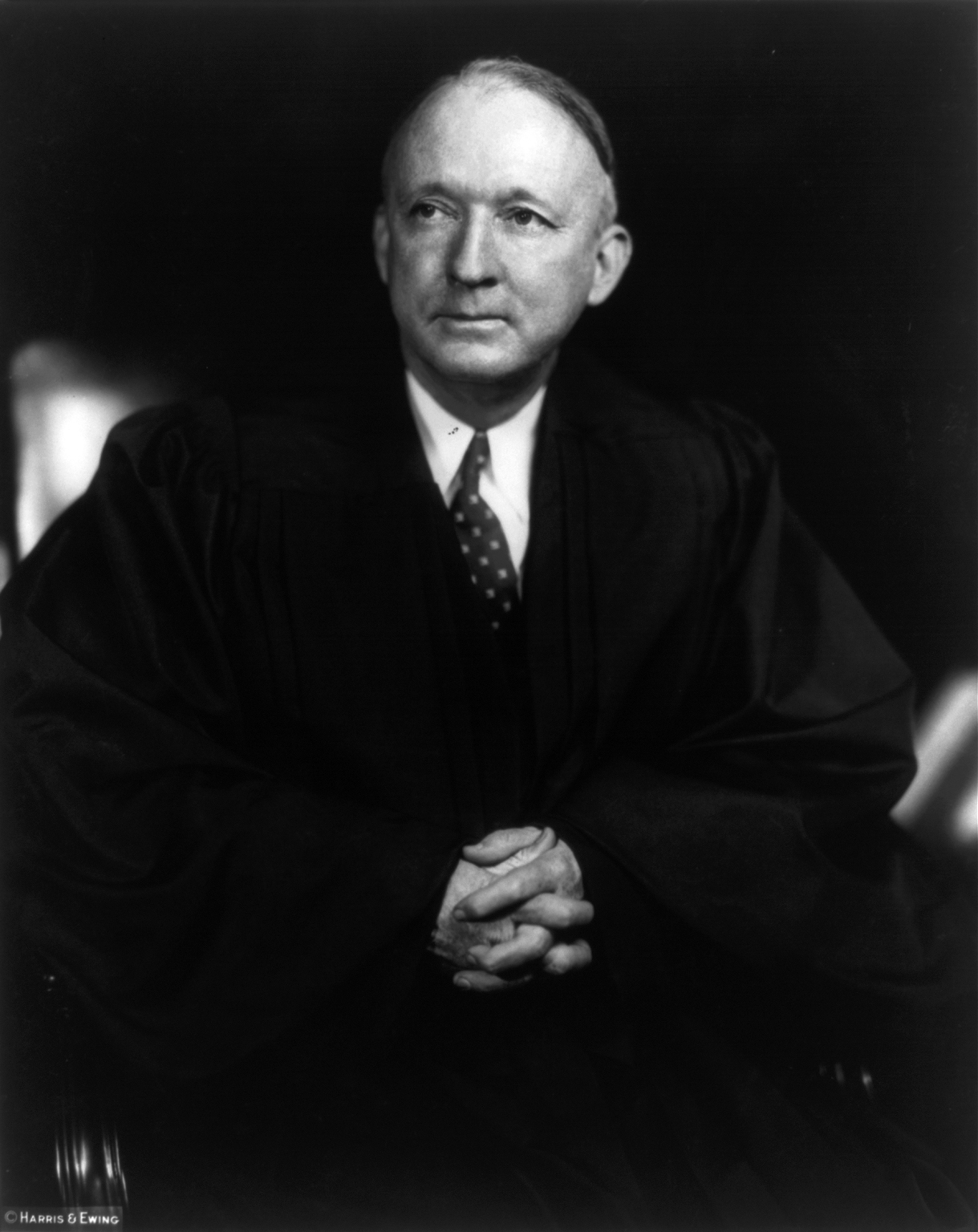
Justice Hugo Black, author of the unanimous opinion

=== Arguments ===
Glen A. Wilkinson argued the case for Seymour. Washington Assistant Attorney General Stephen C. Way argued the case for the state of Washington. At the request of the court United States Solicitor General J. Lee Rankin filed a memorandum with the court.

=== Unanimous opinion ===
Justice Hugo Black announced the opinion of a unanimous court. Black looked to the statutes that affected the Colville Indian Reservation and noted that the 1892 act expressly reserved the southern half for use of the tribes under control of the federal government. The 1916 presidential proclamation merely set forth the procedure for settlement, and neither the proclamation nor the enabling act had any language terminating the reservation. Black further noted that a 1956 statute recognized the continued existence of the reservation, and a 1953 statute explained how the state could obtain jurisdiction once certain conditions were met. Black observed that those conditions had not yet been met. The statutes opening up the reservation to settlement merely allowed non-Indians to move onto the reservation and did not end reservation status.

Black stated that "Since the burglary with which petitioner was charged occurred on property plainly located within the limits of that reservation, the courts of Washington had no jurisdiction to try him for that offense." The case was reversed and remanded to the Washington Supreme Court.
