= Lex ferenda =

Lex ferenda is a Latin expression that means "future law" used in the sense of "what the law should be" (as opposed to lex lata - "the current law"). The derivative expression de lege ferenda means "with a view to the future law". The expressions are generally used in the context of proposals for legislative improvements, especially in the academic literature, both in the Anglo-American and in the continental legal systems.

== See also ==
- Lex lata
- De sententia ferenda
- List of Latin phrases
