= Law of the case =

The law of the case is a legal term of art that is applicable mainly in common law, or Anglo-American, jurisdictions that recognize the related doctrine of stare decisis. The phrase refers to instances where "rulings made by a trial court and not challenged on appeal become the law of the case." "Unless the trial court's rulings were clearly in error or there has been an important change in circumstances, the court's prior rulings must stand." Usually the situation occurs when either a case is on appeal for the second time—e.g. if the reviewing court remanded the matter to the trial court and the party appeals again or if the case was appealed in a higher appellate court—for example, from an appellate court to the highest court.

As generally used, "law of the case" states that, if an appellate court has passed on a legal question and remanded the case to the court below for further proceedings, the legal question thus determined by the appellate court will not be differently determined on a subsequent appeal in the same case where the facts remain the same.

The doctrine provides that an appellate court's determination on a legal issue is binding on both the trial court on remand and on the appellate court on a subsequent appeal given the same case and substantially the same facts.

The "law of the case" doctrine, however, is one of policy only and will be disregarded when compelling circumstances call for a redetermination of a point of law on prior appeal. This is particularly true where an intervening or a contemporaneous change in law has occurred where former decisions have been overruled or new precedent has been established by controlling authority.

The "law of the case" doctrine precludes reconsideration of a previously decided issue unless one of three "exceptional circumstances" exists: (1) when substantially different evidence is raised at a subsequent trial, (2) when a subsequent contrary view of the law is decided by the controlling authority, or (3) when a decision is clearly erroneous and would result in a manifest injustice.

== See also ==
- Res judicata
