= Taylor v. Louisiana =

- Supreme Court of the United States

Argued October 16, 1974 Decided January 21, 1975
- Full case name: Billy J. Taylor v. Louisiana
- Citations: 419 U.S. 522 (more) 95 S. Ct. 692, 42 L. Ed. 2d 690; 1975 U.S. LEXIS 2

Case history
- Prior: Appeal from the Louisiana Supreme Court

Holding
- A criminal defendant's 6th and 14th Amendment Rights are violated by the systematic exclusion of women from jury service.

Court membership
- Chief Justice Warren E. Burger Associate Justices William O. Douglas · William J. Brennan Jr. Potter Stewart · Byron White; Thurgood Marshall · Harry Blackmun; Lewis F. Powell Jr. · William Rehnquist

Case opinions
- Majority: White, joined by Douglas, Brennan, Stewart, Marshall, Blackmun, Powell
- Concurrence: Burger
- Dissent: Rehnquist

Laws applied
- U.S. Const. amend. XIV
- This case overturned a previous ruling or rulings
- Hoyt v. Florida (1961)

Taylor v. Louisiana, 419 U.S. 522 (1975), is a landmark decision of the US Supreme Court which held that systematically excluding women from a venire, or jury pool, by requiring (only) them to actively register for jury duty violated the defendant's right to a representative venire. The court overturned Hoyt v. Florida, the 1961 case that had allowed such a practice.

== Background ==
Billy J. Taylor was indicted and tried for "aggravated kidnapping" under Louisiana's then-mandatory capital sentencing system. While armed with a butcher knife, he approached an automobile occupied by Mrs. Louise Willie, her daughter, and grandson, forced her to go to an abandoned road near Mandeville, where he raped her before robbing them. Both parties agreed:

53% of the persons eligible for jury service in these parishes were female, and that no more than 10% of the persons on the jury wheel in St. Tammany Parish were women. During the period from December 8, 1971, to November 3, 1972, 12 females were among the 1,800 persons drawn to fill petit jury venires in St. Tammany Parish. It was also stipulated that the discrepancy between females eligible for jury service and those actually included in the venire was the result of the operation of La.Const., Art. VII, § 41, and La.Code Crim.Proc., Art. 402. In the present case, a venire totaling 175 persons was drawn for jury service beginning April 13, 1972. There were no females on the venire. [His attorney objected....] After being tried, convicted, and sentenced to death, appellant sought review in the Supreme Court of Louisiana, where he renewed his claim that the petit jury venire should have been quashed. The Supreme Court of Louisiana, recognizing that this claim drew into question the constitutionality of the provisions of the Louisiana Constitution and Code of Criminal Procedure dealing with the service of women on juries, squarely held, one justice dissenting, that these provisions were valid and not unconstitutional under federal law.

— Taylor v. Louisiana [Footnotes and citations removed].

== Issues ==
The issue before the court was not whether Taylor actually kidnapped anyone, but whether he had a fair trial because Louisiana law had a "conceded systematic impact" to eliminate female jurors from his jury:

The issue we have, therefore, is whether a jury selection system which operates to exclude from jury service an identifiable class of citizens constituting 53% of eligible jurors in the community comports with the Sixth and Fourteenth Amendments.

— Taylor v. Louisiana.

A secondary issue was whether Taylor had standing, as a man who would not be excluded from jury duty in Louisiana, to challenge the rule.

== Decision ==
The Supreme Court "changed its mind and ruled the affirmative registration process was unconstitutional:"

We are also persuaded that the fair cross-section requirement is violated by the systematic exclusion of women, who, in the judicial district involved here, amounted to 53% of the citizens eligible for jury service. This conclusion necessarily entails the judgment that women are sufficiently numerous and distinct from men, and that, if they are systematically eliminated from jury panels, the Sixth Amendment's fair cross-section requirement cannot be satisfied.

— Taylor v. Louisiana

On the secondary issue of standing, it held:

Taylor's claim is that he was constitutionally entitled to a jury drawn from a venire constituting a fair cross-section of the community, and that the jury that tried him was not such a jury by reason of the exclusion of women. Taylor was not a member of the excluded class, but there is no rule that claims such as Taylor presents may be made only by those defendants who are members of the group excluded from jury service.

— Taylor v. Louisiana

=== Reasoning ===
The Courts' reasoning was based heavily on the precedent from prior case law: "The Court's prior cases are instructive":

The background against which this case must be decided includes our holding in Duncan v. Louisiana, 391 U. S. 145 (1968), that the Sixth Amendment's provision for jury trial is made binding on the States by virtue of the Fourteenth Amendment. Our inquiry is whether the presence of a fair cross-section of the community on venires, panels, or lists from which petit juries are drawn is essential to the fulfillment of the Sixth Amendment's guarantee of an impartial jury trial in criminal prosecutions.... Both in the course of exercising its supervisory powers over trials in federal courts and in the constitutional context, the Court has unambiguously declared that the American concept of the jury trial contemplates a jury drawn from a fair cross-section of the community. A unanimous Court stated in Smith v. Texas, 311 U. S. 128, 311 U. S. 130 (1940), that "[i]t is part of the established tradition in the use of juries as instruments of public justice that the jury be a body truly representative of the community." To exclude racial groups from jury service was said to be "at war with our basic concepts of a democratic society and a representative government." A state jury system that resulted in systematic exclusion of Negroes as jurors was therefore held to violate the Equal Protection Clause of the Fourteenth Amendment. Glasser v. United States, 315 U. S. 60, 315 U. S. 85-86 (1942)....

— Taylor v. Louisiana.

Duncan v. Louisiana appears to have been especially important to the court for use as a precedent. It was a significant United States Supreme Court decision, which incorporated the Sixth Amendment right to a jury trial and applied it to the states.

Ballard v. United States (1946), another precedent, concerned the exclusion of "an economic or racial group". Ultimately, the line of cases come from Glasser v. United States (1942), Smith v. Texas (1940), Pierre v. Louisiana (1939), and Strauder v. State of West Virginia (1880), all of which concerned the exclusion of blacks from juries as unconstitutional violations of the Equal Protection Clause.

== See also ==
- Women in United States juries
