= Lex lata =

Latin phrase with international legal significance

Lex lata (also called de lege lata) is a Latin expression used in matters of international law. Its most common translation is "the law as it exists," but it is sometimes seen as "the law that has been borne," or "ratified law."

When used in legal proceedings, lex lata refers to the law that is presently enforced. This rules out any previous laws or laws that have not been passed, and prevents the use of hypothetical arguments from any interpreters of the term.

Lex lata can be compared to lus conditum ("established law"), and its opposite is lex ferenda, which translates to "future law" or "what the law ought to be."

== Etymology ==
"Lēx" is Latin for "law, and "lata" is derived from the word "lātus," which means "broad" or "wide."

== See also ==
- List of Latin phrases
