= Res judicata =

Claim preclusion in law

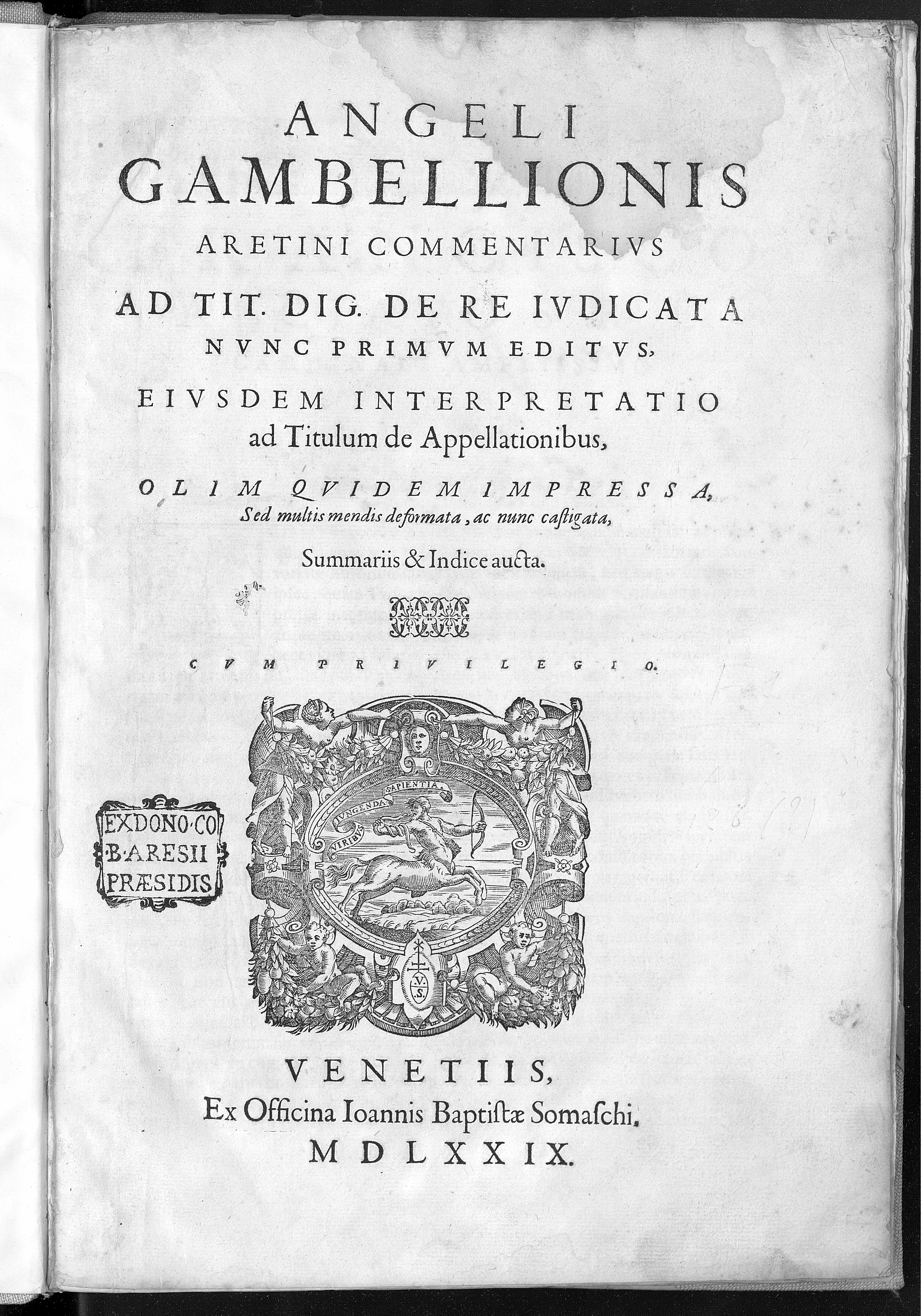
Angelo Gambiglioni, De re iudicata, 1579

Res judicata or res iudicata, also known as claim preclusion, is the Latin term for judged matter, and refers to either of two concepts in common law civil procedure: a case in which there has been a final judgment and that is no longer subject to appeal; and the legal doctrine meant to bar (or preclude) relitigation of a claim between the same parties.

In the case of res judicata, the matter cannot be raised again, either in the same court or in a different court. A court will use res judicata to deny reconsideration of a matter. The doctrine of res judicata is a method of preventing injustice to the parties of a completed case, and avoiding waste of judicial resources. Res judicata does not merely prevent future judgments from contradicting earlier ones, but also prevents litigants from multiplying judgments.

It is similar to the concept of double jeopardy and non bis in idem in criminal law, but the protection in criminal prosecutions only bars an identical prosecution for the same offense. However, a different offense may be charged on identical evidence at a second trial; whereas, res judicata precludes any causes of action or claims that may arise from the previously litigated subject matter.

== Common law ==
In common law jurisdictions, the principle of res judicata may be asserted either by a judge or a defendant.

Once a final judgment has been handed down in a lawsuit, subsequent judges who are confronted with a suit that is identical to or substantially the same as the earlier one will apply the res judicata doctrine to preserve the effect of the first judgment.

A defendant in a lawsuit may use res judicata as defense. The general rule is that a plaintiff who prosecuted an action against a defendant and obtained a valid final judgment is not able to initiate another action against the same defendant where:

- the claim is based on the same transaction that was at issue in the first action;
- the plaintiff seeks a different remedy, or further remedy, than was obtained in the first action;
- the claim is of such nature as could have been joined in the first action.

For example, once a bankruptcy plan is confirmed in a court action, the plan is binding on all parties involved. Any question regarding the plan which could have been raised but was not may be barred by res judicata.

The Seventh Amendment to the United States Constitution provides that no fact having been tried by a jury shall be otherwise re-examinable in any court of the United States or of any state than according to the rules of law.

For res judicata to be binding, several factors must be met:

- identity in the thing at suit;
- identity of the cause at suit;
- identity of the parties to the action;
- identity in the designation of the parties involved;
- whether the judgment was final;
- whether the parties were given full and fair opportunity to be heard on the issue.

Regarding designation of the parties involved, a person may be involved in an action while filling a given office (e.g. as the agent of another), and may subsequently initiate the same action in a differing capacity (e.g. as his own agent). In that case res judicata would not be available as a defence unless the defendant could show that the differing designations were not legitimate and sufficient.

=== Scope ===
Res judicata includes two related concepts: claim preclusion and issue preclusion (also called collateral estoppel or issue estoppel), though sometimes res judicata is used more narrowly to mean only claim preclusion.

Claim preclusion bars a suit from being brought again on an event which was the subject of a previous legal cause of action that has already been finally decided between the parties or those in privity with a party.

Issue preclusion bars the relitigation of issues of fact or law that have already been necessarily determined by a judge or jury as part of an earlier case.

It is often difficult to determine which, if either, of these concepts apply to later lawsuits that are seemingly related, because many causes of action can apply to the same factual situation and vice versa. The scope of an earlier judgment is probably the most difficult question that judges must resolve in applying res judicata. Sometimes merely part of the action will be affected. For example, a single claim may be struck from a complaint, or a single factual issue may be removed from reconsideration in the new trial.

Res judicata bars matters which were actually decided in an earlier action and also matters which could have been decided.

=== Rationale ===
Res judicata is intended to strike a balance between competing interests. Its primary purpose is to assure an efficient judicial system. A related purpose is to create "repose" and finality.

US Supreme Court Justice Potter Stewart explained the need for this legal precept as follows:

Federal courts have traditionally adhered to the related doctrines of res judicata (claim preclusion) and collateral estoppel (issue preclusion). Under res judicata, a final judgment on the merits of an action precludes the parties ... from re-litigating issues that were or could have been raised in that action. Under collateral estoppel, once a court has decided an issue of fact or law necessary to its judgment, that decision may preclude re-litigation of the issue in a suit on a different cause of action involving a party to the first cause. As this court and other courts have often recognised, res judicata and collateral estoppel relieve parties of the costs and vexation of multiple lawsuits, conserve judicial resources, and by preventing inconsistent decisions, encourage reliance on adjudication.

=== Exceptions to application ===
Res judicata does not restrict the appeals process, which is considered a linear extension of the same lawsuit as the suit travels up (and back down) the appellate court ladder. Appeals are considered the appropriate manner by which to challenge a judgment rather than trying to start a new trial. Once the appeals process is exhausted or waived, res judicata will apply even to a judgment that is contrary to law. In states that permit a judgment to be renewed, a lawsuit to renew the judgment would not be barred by res judicata, but in states that do not permit renewal by action (as opposed to renewal by scire facias or by motion), such an action would be rejected by the courts as vexatious.

There are limited exceptions to res judicata that allow a party to attack the validity of the original judgment, even outside of appeals. These exceptions—usually called collateral attacks—are typically based on procedural or jurisdictional issues, based not on the wisdom of the earlier court's decision but its authority or on the competence of the earlier court to issue that decision. A collateral attack is more likely to be available (and to succeed) in judicial systems with multiple jurisdictions, such as under federal governments, or when a domestic court is asked to enforce or recognise the judgment of a foreign court.

In addition, in matters involving due process, cases that appear to be res judicata may be re-litigated. An example would be the establishment of a right to counsel. People who have had liberty taken away (i.e., imprisoned) may be allowed to be re-tried with a counselor as a matter of fairness.

Res judicata may not apply in cases involving the England reservation. If a litigant files suit in federal court, and that court stays proceedings to allow a state court to consider the questions of state law, the litigant may inform the state court that he reserves any federal-law issues in the action for federal court. If he makes such a reservation, res judicata would not bar him from returning the case to federal court at conclusion of action in state court.

There is a declaratory judgment exception to res judicata. "[A] declaratory action determines only what it actually decides and does not have a claim preclusive effect on other contentions that might have been advanced." Therefore, "a plaintiff who has lost a declaratory judgment action may also bring a subsequent action for other relief, subject to the constraint of the determinations made in the declaratory action." This exception has been adopted in Oregon, Texas, and a number of other U.S. states.

Res judicata may be avoided if claimant was not afforded a full and fair opportunity to litigate the issue decided by a state court. They could file suit in a federal court to challenge the adequacy of the state's procedures. In that case the federal suit would be against the state and not against the defendant in the first suit.

Res judicata will not apply if consent (or tacit agreement) is justification for splitting a claim. If a plaintiff splits a claim in the course of a suit with special or justifiable reasons for doing so, a judgment in that action may not have the usual consequence of extinguishing the entire claim.

However, once a case has been appealed, finality of the appellate court's decision is vindicated in that proceeding by giving effect in later proceedings involving the same matter, whether in the appellate or lower courts. This is the law of the case doctrine.

=== Failure to apply ===
When a subsequent court fails to apply res judicata and renders a contradictory verdict on the same claim or issue, if a third court is faced with the same case, it will likely apply a "last in time" rule, giving effect only to the later judgment, even though the result came out differently the second time. This situation is not unheard of, as it is typically the responsibility of the parties to the suit to bring the earlier case to the judge's attention, and the judge must decide how broadly to apply it, or whether to recognise it in the first place.

== Civil law ==
The doctrine of res judicata in nations that have a civil law legal system is much narrower in scope than in common law nations. In civil law countries adopting German legal concepts, such as Japan and Taiwan, the res judicata (Rechtskraft) is in close connection with the cause of action (Streitgegenstand). However, the theory of cause of action itself is different in Germany and Japan and Taiwan, therefore the scope of res judicata are different in the above countries.

== International law ==
Res judicata applies in international arbitration and other proceedings. Article 59 of the International Court of Justice Statute states "The decision of the Court has no binding force except between the parties and in respect of that particular case"; this article, taken together with Article 60, "The judgment is final without appeal", is a clear statement of the principle of res judicata - that the same parties may not relitigate a case that has already been adjudicated.

Additionally, under Article 38 (1)(c) of the same statute, it is considered a "general principle of law recognized by civilized nations". The applicability of the principle was confirmed in the Corfu Channel case (1947-49) and the Barcelona Traction Co. Case (1970).

== See also ==
- Direct estoppel
- Double jeopardy
- Estoppel
- Judicial estoppel
- Precedent
- Peremptory plea
