= Black studies =

Academic field focusing on peoples of the African diaspora and Africa

Map of Africa and the African diaspora throughout the world

Black studies, or Africana studies (Note: Also known by nationally specific terms, such as African American studies or Black Canadian studies. For more information, see the nomenclature section.), is an interdisciplinary academic field that primarily focuses on the study of the history, culture, and politics of the peoples of the Black African diaspora and Africa. The field includes scholars of African-American, Afro-Canadian, Afro-Caribbean, Afro-Latino, Afro-European, Afro-Asian, African Australian, and African literature, history, politics, and religion as well as scholars from disciplines, such as sociology, anthropology, cultural studies, psychology, education, and many other disciplines within the humanities and social sciences. The field also uses various types of research methods.

Intensive academic efforts to reconstruct African-American history began in the late 19th century (W. E. B. Du Bois, The Suppression of the African Slave-trade to the United States of America, 1896). Among the pioneers in the first half of the 20th century were Carter G. Woodson, Herbert Aptheker, Melville Herskovits, and Lorenzo Dow Turner.

Programs and departments of Black studies in the United States were first created in the 1960s and 1970s as a result of inter-ethnic student and faculty activism at many universities, sparked by a five-month strike for Black studies at San Francisco State University. In February 1968, San Francisco State hired sociologist Nathan Hare to coordinate the first Black studies program and write a proposal for the first Department of Black Studies; the department was created in September 1968 and gained official status at the end of the five-month strike in the spring of 1969. Hare's views reflected those of the Black power movement, and he believed that the department should empower Black students. The creation of programs and departments in Black studies was a common demand of protests and sit-ins by Black students and their allies, who felt that their cultures, history, and interests were diminished and neglected by the traditional academic structures in the previous 200 years of higher education.

Black studies departments, programs, and courses were also created in the United Kingdom, the Caribbean, Brazil, Canada, Colombia, Ecuador, and Venezuela.

== Nomenclature ==
The academic discipline is known by various names. In 2009, Ama Mazama expounded:

In the appendix to their recently published Handbook of Black Studies, Asante and Karenga note that "the naming of the discipline" remains "unsettled" (Asante & Karenga, 2006, p. 421). This remark came as a result of an extensive survey of existing Black Studies programs, which led to the editors identifying a multiplicity of names for the discipline: Africana Studies, African and African Diaspora Studies, African/Black World Studies, Pan-African Studies, Africology, African and New World Studies, African Studies–Major, Black World Studies, Latin American Studies, Latin American and Caribbean Studies, Black and Hispanic Studies, Africana and Latin American Studies, African and African-American Studies, Black and Hispanic Studies, African American Studies, Afro-American Studies, African American Education Program, Afro-Ethnic Studies, American Ethnic Studies, American Studies–African-American Emphasis, Black Studies, Comparative American Cultures, Ethnic Studies Programs, Race and Ethnic Studies.

In 2014, Victor Okafor clarified:

What appears to drive these distinctive names is a combination of factors: the composite expertise of their faculty, their faculty's areas of specialization, and the worldviews of the faculty that make up each unit. By worldview, I am referring to the question of whether the constituent faculty in a given setting manifests any or a combination of the following visions of our project:

- a domestic vision of black studies that sees it as focusing exclusively on the affairs of only United States African Americans who descended from the generation of enslaved Africans
- a diasporic vision of black studies that is inclusive of the affairs of all of African descendants in the New World—that is, the Americas: North America, South America and the Caribbean
- a globalistic vision of the black studies—that is, a viewpoint that thinks in terms of an African world—a world encompassing African-origin communities that are scattered across the globe and the continent of Africa itself.

== History by region ==
=== Americas ===
==== North America ====
===== Canada =====
In 1991, the national chair for Black Canadian Studies, which was named after James Robinson Johnston, was created at Dalhousie University for the purpose of advancing the development and presence of Black studies in Canada. Aleksandr Sergeevich Pushkin was studied by the Black Canadian Studies chairman, John Barnstead.

===== Mexico =====
Through development of the publication, The black population in Mexico (1946), Gonzalo Aguirre Beltrán made way for the development of Afro-Mexican studies.

===== United States =====
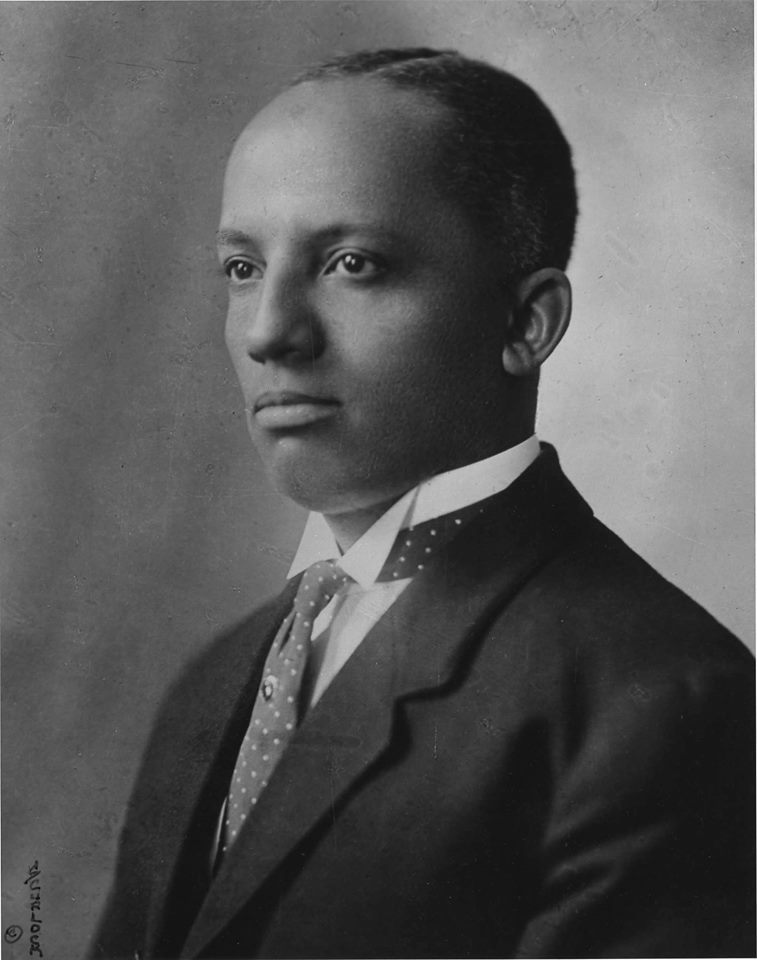
Carter G. Woodson, United States

A specific aim and objective of this interdisciplinary field of study is to help students broaden their knowledge of the worldwide human experience by presenting an aspect of that experience—the Black Experience—which has traditionally been neglected or distorted by educational institutions. Additionally, this course of study strives to introduce an Afro-centric perspective, including phenomena related to the culture. According to Robert Harris Jr, an emeritus professor of history at the Africana Studies Research Center at Cornell, there have been four stages in the development of Africana studies: from the 1890s until the Second World War, numerous organizations developed to analyze the culture and history of African peoples. In the second stage, the focus turned to African Americans. In the third stage, a bevy of newly conceived academic programs were established as Black studies.

In the United States, the 1960s is rightfully known as the "Turbulent Sixties." During this time period, the nation experienced great social unrest, as residents challenged the social order in radical ways. Many movements took place in the United States during this time period, including women's rights movement, labor rights movement, and the civil rights movement.

The students at the University of California, Berkeley (UC Berkeley) were witnesses to the Civil Rights Movement, and by 1964, they were thrust into activism. On October 1, 1964, Jack Weinberg, a former graduate student, was sitting at a table where the Congress of Racial Equality (CORE) was distributing literature encouraging students to protest against institutional racism. Police asked Weinberg to produce his ID to confirm that he was a student, but he refused to do so and was, therefore, arrested. In support of Weinberg, 3,000 students surrounded the police vehicle, and even used the car as a podium, from where they spoke about their right to engage in political protest on campus. This impromptu demonstration was the first of many protests, culminating in the institutionalization of Black studies.

Two months later, students at UC Berkeley organized a sit-in at the Sproul Hall Administration building to protest an unfair rule that prohibited all political clubs from fundraising, excluding the democrat and republican clubs. Police arrested 800 students. Students formed a "freedom of speech movement" and Mario Savio became its poetic leader, stating that "freedom of speech was something that represents the very dignity of what a human is." The Students for a Democratic Society (SDS), a well-connected and organized club, hosted a conference entitled "Black Power and its Challenges." Black leaders, who were directly tied to then ongoing civil rights movements, spoke to a predominantly white audience about their respective goals and challenges. These leaders included Stokely Carmichael of the Student Nonviolent Coordinating Committee (SNCC) and James Bevel of the Southern Christian Leadership Conference (SCLC).

Educational conferences, like that of the SDS, forced the university to take some measures to correct the most obvious racial issue on campus—the sparse black student population. In 1966, the school held its first official racial and ethnic survey, in which it was discovered that the "American Negro" represented 1.02% of the university population. In 1968, the university instituted its Educational Opportunity Program (EOP), facilitated the increased minority student enrollment, and offered financial aid to minority students with high potential. By 1970, there were 1,400 EOP students. As the minority student population increased, tension between activists clubs and minorities rose because minorities wanted the reigns of the movement that affected them directly. One student asserted that it was "backward to educate white people about Black Power when many black people are still uneducated on the matter. "The members of the Afro-American Student Union (AASU) proposed an academic department called "Black Studies" in April 1968. "We demand a program of 'Black Studies', a program that will be of and for black people. We demand to be educated realistically and that no form of education which attempts to lie to us, or otherwise mis-educate us will be accepted."

AASU members asserted: "The young people of America are the inheritors of what is undoubtedly one of the most challenging, and threatening set of social circumstances that has ever fallen upon a generation of young people in history." Everyone learns differently and teaching only one way is a cause for students to not want to learn, which eventually leads to dropping out. All students have their specialties, but teachers don't use that to help them in their learning community. Instead, they use a broad way of teaching just to get the information out. AASU used these claims to gain ground on their proposal to create a Black studies department. Nathan Hare, a sociology professor at San Francisco State University, created what was known as the "A Conceptual Proposal for Black Studies" and AASU used Hare's framework to create a set of criteria. A Black studies program was implemented by the UC Berkeley administration on January 13, 1969. In 1969, St. Clair Drake was named the first chair of the degree granting, Program in African and Afro-American Studies at Stanford University. Many Black studies programs and departments and programs around the nation were created in subsequent years.

At University of California, Santa Barbara, similarly, student activism led to the establishment of a Black studies department, amidst great targeting and discrimination of student leaders of color on the University of California campuses. In the Autumn season of 1968, black students from UCSB joined the national civil rights movement to end racial segregation and exclusion of Black history and studies from college campuses. Triggered by the insensitivity of the administration and general campus life, they occupied North Hall and presented the administration with a set of demands. Such efforts led to the eventual creation of the Black studies department and the Center for Black Studies.

Similar activism was happening outside of California. At Yale University, a committee, headed by political scientist, Robert Dahl, recommended establishing an undergraduate major in African-American culture, one of the first of such at an American university.

When Ernie Davis, who was from Syracuse University, became the first African American to win the Heisman Trophy in college football, it renewed debates about race on college campuses in the country. Inspired by the Davis win, civil rights movement, and nationwide student activism, in 1969, black and white students, led by the Student African American Society (SAS), at Syracuse University, marched in front of the building at Newhouse and demanded for Black studies to be taught at Syracuse. It existed as an independent, underfunded non-degree offering program from 1971 until 1979. In 1979, the program became the Department of African American Studies, offering degrees within the College of Arts and Sciences.

Unlike the other stages, Black studies grew out of mass rebellions of black college students and faculty in search of a scholarship of change. The fourth stage, the new name "Africana studies" involved a theoretical elaboration of the discipline of Black studies according to African cultural reclamation and disparate tenets in the historical and cultural issues of Africanity within a professorial interpretation of the interactions between these fields and college administrations.

Thus, Africana studies reflected the mellowing and institutionalization of the Black studies movement in the course of its integration into the mainstream academic curriculum. Black studies and Africana studies differ primarily in that Africana studies focuses on Africanity and the historical and cultural issues of Africa and its descendants, while Black studies was designed to deal with the uplift and development of the black (African-American) community in relationship to education and its "relevance" to the black community. The adaptation of the term, "Africana studies", appears to have derived from the encyclopedic work of W. E. B. Du Bois and Carter G. Woodson. James Turner, who was recruited from graduate school at Northwestern on the heels of the student rebellions of 1969, first used the term to describe a global approach to Black studies and name the "Africana Studies and Research Center" at Cornell, where he acted as the founding director.

Studia Africana, subtitled "An International Journal of Africana Studies", was published by the Department for African American Studies at the University of Cincinnati in a single issue in 1977 (an unrelated journal called Studia Africana is published by the Centro de Estudios Africanos, in Barcelona, since 1990). The International Journal of Africana Studies (ISSN 1056-8689) has been appearing since 1992, published by the National Council for Black Studies.

Africana philosophy is a part of and developed within the field of Africana studies.

In 1988 and 1990, publications on African-American studies were funded by the Ford Foundation, and the African-American academics who produced the publications used traditional disciplinary orthodoxies, from outside of African-American studies, to analyze and evaluate the boundaries, structure, and legitimacy of African-American studies. To the detriment of the field, an abundance of research on African American studies has been developed by academics who are not within the discipline of African American studies. Rather, the academics, and the scholarship they have produced about African American studies, has been characterized as bearing an "Aryan hegemonic worldview." Due to a staffing shortage in the field of African American studies, academics in the field, who are trained in traditional fields, carry with them presumptions of the primacy of their field of training's viewpoints, which tends to result in the marginalization of the African phenomena that are the subjects of study and even the field of African American studies at-large. Consequently, matters of development of theory as well as the development of historical and African consciousness frequently go overlooked. As the focus of African American studies is the study of the African diaspora and Africa, including the problems of the African diaspora and Africa, this makes the theory of Afrocentricity increasingly relevant.

The National Council for Black Studies has also recognized the problem of academics, who have been trained in fields such as education, economics, history, philosophy, political science, psychology, and sociology – fields outside of African American studies – and are committed to their disciplinary training, yet are not able to recognize the shortcomings of their training, as it relates to the field of African American studies that they are entering into. Furthermore, such academics, who would also recognize themselves as experts in the discipline of African American studies, would also attempt to assess the legitimacy of Africology – done so, through analysis based on critical rhetoric rather than based on pensive research.

Following the Black studies movement and Africana studies movement, Molefi Kete Asante identifies the Africological movement as a subsequent academic movement. Asante authored the book Afrocentricity, in 1980. Within the book, Asante used the term "Afrology" as the name for the interdisciplinary field of Black studies, and defined it as "the Afrocentric study of African phenomena." Later, Winston Van Horne changed Asante's use of the term "Afrology" to "Africology." Asante then went on to use his earlier definition for "Afrology" as the definition for his newly adopted term, "Africology". Systematic Africology, which is a research method in the field of Black studies that was developed by Asante, utilizes the theory of Afrocentricity to analyze and evaluate African phenomena. In an effort to shift Black studies away from its interdisciplinary status toward disciplinary status, Asante recommended that Afrocentricity should be the meta-paradigm for Black studies and that the new name for Black studies should be Africology; this is intended to shift Black studies away from having a "topical definition" of studying African peoples, which is shared with other disciplines, toward having a "perspectival definition" that is unique in how African peoples are studied – that is, the study of African peoples, through a centered perspective, which is rooted in and derives from the cultures and experiences of African peoples. By doing so, as Ama Mazama indicates, this should increase how relevant Black studies is and strengthen its disciplinary presence.

==== Caribbean ====
Among English-speaking countries of the Caribbean, scholars educated in the United States and Britain added considerably to the development of Black studies. Scholars, such as Fitzroy Baptiste, Richard Goodridge, Elsa Goveia, Allister Hinds, Rupert Lewis, Bernard Marshall, James Millette, and Alvin Thompson, added to the development of Black studies at the University of the West Indies campuses in Barbados, Jamaica, and Trinidad.

===== Cuba =====
During the early 1900s, Fernando Ortiz pioneered the emerging field of Afro-Cuban studies. On January 16, 1937, the Society for Afro-Cuban Studies was established. Afro-Cuban Studies (Estudios Afrocubanos) is the academic journal for the Society for Afro-Cuban Studies (SEAC/Sociedad de Estudios Afrocubanos). In 1939, Rómulo Lachatañeré's academic work appeared in a volume of this journal.

===== Dominican Republic =====
In 1967, Carlos Larrazábal Blanco authored, Los Negros Y La Esclavitud En Santo Domingo, which is considered to be a foundational academic work in Afro-Dominican studies. Even in areas of the Dominican Republic with many Afro-Dominicans and where Afro-Dominican culture is predominant, there has been an ongoing challenge in Afro-Dominican studies to find linguistic evidence of a remnant Afro-Dominican language.

===== Haiti =====
Lorimer Denis, Francois Duvalier, and Jean Price-Mars, as founders of the Bureau of Ethnology and leading figures in the Noirisme movement in Haiti, were also influential in the publishing of the foundational Afro-Haitian studies journal, Les Griots. One of the most influential academics in Afro-Haitian studies is René Piquion.

===== Puerto Rico =====
As of 2019, Afro-Puerto Rican studies is not offered as a degree program by the University of Puerto Rico. Numerous academic publications, such as Arrancando Mitos De Raiz: Guia Para La Ensenanza Antirracista De La Herencia Africana En Puerto Rico, were scholarly works that established Isar Godreau as a leading academic in Afro-Puerto Rican Studies.

==== Central America ====
===== Costa Rica =====
The Executive branch created a law to establish a Committee for Afro-Costa Rican Studies, as one, among other laws, to increase the level of inclusion of Afro-Costa Ricans in Costa Rica.

===== Guatemala =====
Christopher H. Lutz authored, Santiago de Guatemala, 1541–1773, which is considered to be one of the foundational literatures of Afro-Guatemalan studies.

===== Honduras =====
Due to a history of scarce resources and anti-black racism, Afro-Hondurans have largely been excluded from academic publications about Honduras; consequently, Afro-Honduran studies has remained limited in its formal development.

===== Panama =====
In March 1980, along with the Panamanian government, the Afro-Panamanian Studies Center hosted the Second Congress on Black Culture in the Americas.

==== South America ====
===== Argentina =====
Since the 1980s, Afro-Argentine studies has undergone renewed growth.

===== Brazil =====
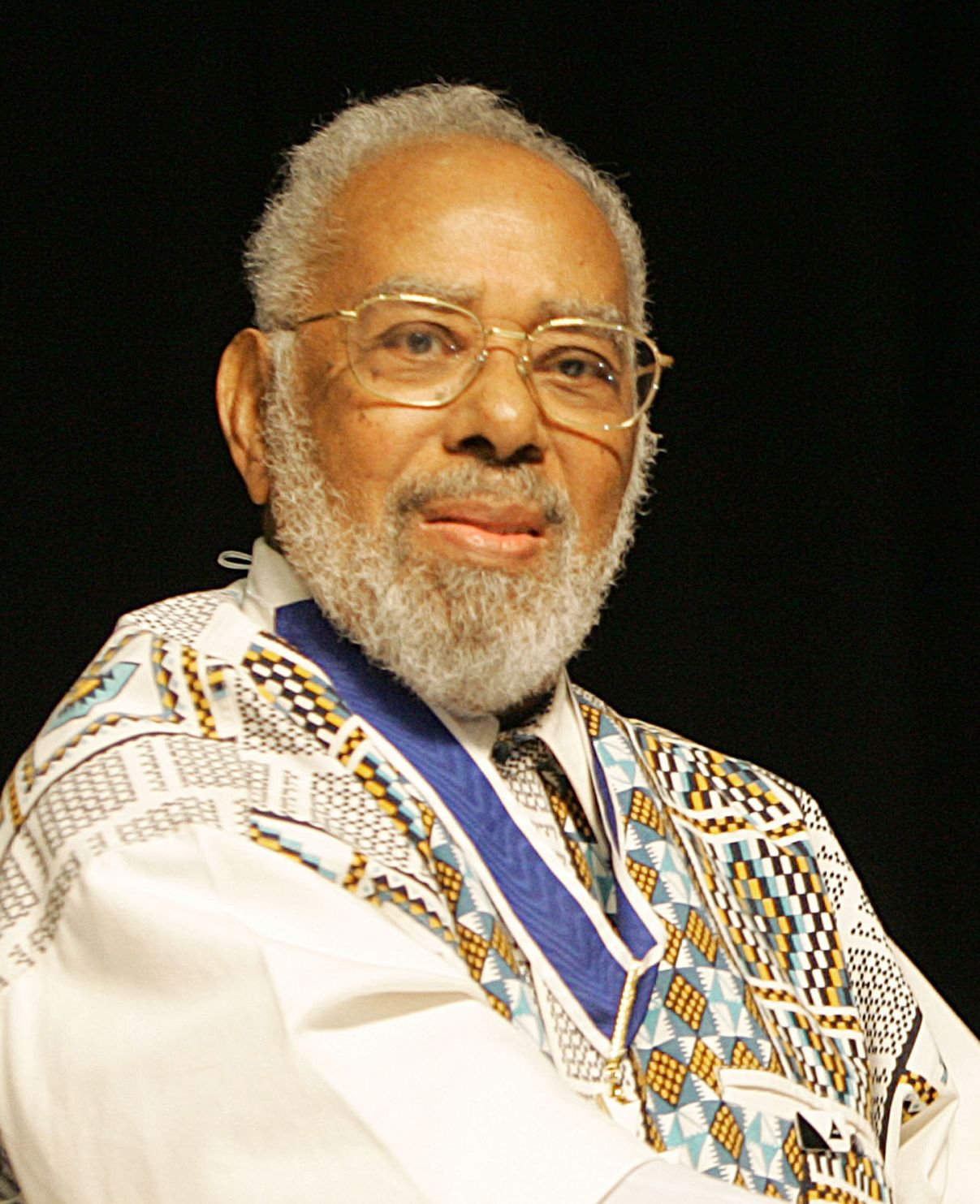
Abdias Nascimento, Brazil

In 1980, Abdias Nascimento gave a presentation in Panama of his scholarship on Kilombismo at the 2nd Congress of Black Culture in the Americas. His scholarship on Kilombismo detailed how the economic and political affairs of Africans throughout the Americas contributed to how they socially organized themselves. Afterward, Nascimento went back to Brazil and began institutionalization of Africana studies in 1981. While at the Pontifical Catholic University of São Paulo, Nascimento developed the Afro-Brazilian Studies and Research Institute (IPEAFRO). A course for professors was provided by IPEAFRO between 1985 and 1995.

===== Chile =====
From the 1920s to the 1950s, publications that included the presence of Afro-Chileans were not systematized, and, from the 1960s to the 1980s, publications continued to group Afro-Chileans with other groups. Since the 2000s, there has been increasing systematization and a more formal development of Afro-Chilean studies, along with a greater focus on Afro-Chileans and the recovery of Afro-Chilean cultural heritage.

===== Colombia =====
Scholars, such as Rogerio Velásquez, Aquiles Escalante, José Rafael Arboleda, and Thomas Price, were forerunners in the development of Afro-Colombian studies in the 1940s and 1950s. In the 1960s, as social science programs became incorporated into university institutions, contributions from anthropologists and social scientists added to its emergence. Following the promulgation of the Colombian Constitution, particularly Article 55, in 1991, Law 70 in 1993, and Decree 804 by the Ministry of Education in 1995, the elements for Afro-Colombian studies began to come together, and historic discrimination of Afro-Colombians was able to begin being addressed, with the development of national educational content about Afro-Colombians and Africa. At the University City of Bogotá, of the National University of Colombia, the Afro-Colombian Studies Group developed and established a training program in Afro-Colombian studies for primary and secondary school teachers. In February 2002, a continuing education diploma program in Afro-Colombian studies was developed and began to be offered at the University of Cauca in Belalcázar, Caldas. At the Pontifical Xavierian University, there is a master's degree program in Afro-Colombian studies. There is also a study abroad program for Afro-Colombian students and African-American students existing between the Afro-Colombian studies program at the Pontifical Xavierian University in Colombia and African-American studies programs at historically black colleges and universities in the United States.

===== Ecuador =====
Afro-Ecuadorians initiated the development of the Center of Afro-Ecuadorian Studies in the late 1970s, which served as a means of organizing academic questions relating to Afro-Ecuadorian identity and history. Though it dissolved in the early 1980s, by the 1990s, organizations that followed in the example of the Center of Afro-Ecuadorian Studies ushered in the development of the Afro-Ecuadorian Etnoeducación program at the National High School, in Chota Valley, Ecuador, and a master's degree program in Afro-Andean Studies at the Simón Bolívar Andean University (UASB), in Quito, Ecuador. With the promulgation of Article 84 of the 1998 Constitution of Ecuador, gave formal recognition was given to Afro-Ecuadorian Etnoeducación. Juan Garcia, who was one of the founders of the Center of Afro-Ecuadorian Studies, is a leading scholar in Afro-Ecuadorian studies and has contributed considerably to the development of the programs in Chota Valley and Quito.

===== Paraguay =====
In 1971, Carvalho Neto authored, Afro-Paraguayan studies.

===== Peru =====
While the presence of Afro-Peruvian studies may not be strong in Peru, the body of scholarship is undergoing growth. There have been efforts to organize the elements of Afro-Peruvian studies in Peru, such as by LUNDU, which organized an international conference for Afro-Peruvian studies in Peru on November 13, 2009. During this LUNDU-organized conference, Luis Rocca, who co-founded the National Afro-Peruvian Museum, and is also a historian, presented on his research regarding Afro-Peruvians. A university student group focused on Afro-Peruvian studies was also created near San Juan de Lurigancho, Lima, Peru. Additionally, there has been some scholarship in Afro-Peruvian studies developed in the United States and a panel on Afro-Peruvian studies at a conference hosted on December 11, 2019, by the Hutchins Center for African and African American Research in the United States.

===== Uruguay =====
Since 1996, the amount of scholarship of Afro-Uruguayan studies has increased as a result of increased global focus on Afro-Latin American studies.

===== Venezuela =====
The curriculum for Afro-Venezuelan studies was developed at Universidad Politécnica Territorial de Barlovento Argelia Laya (UPTBAL), in Higuerote, Barlovento, by Alejandro Correa. In 2006, Afro-Epistemology and African Culture were formally developed as the initial courses for students in this curriculum.

=== Europe ===
==== United Kingdom ====
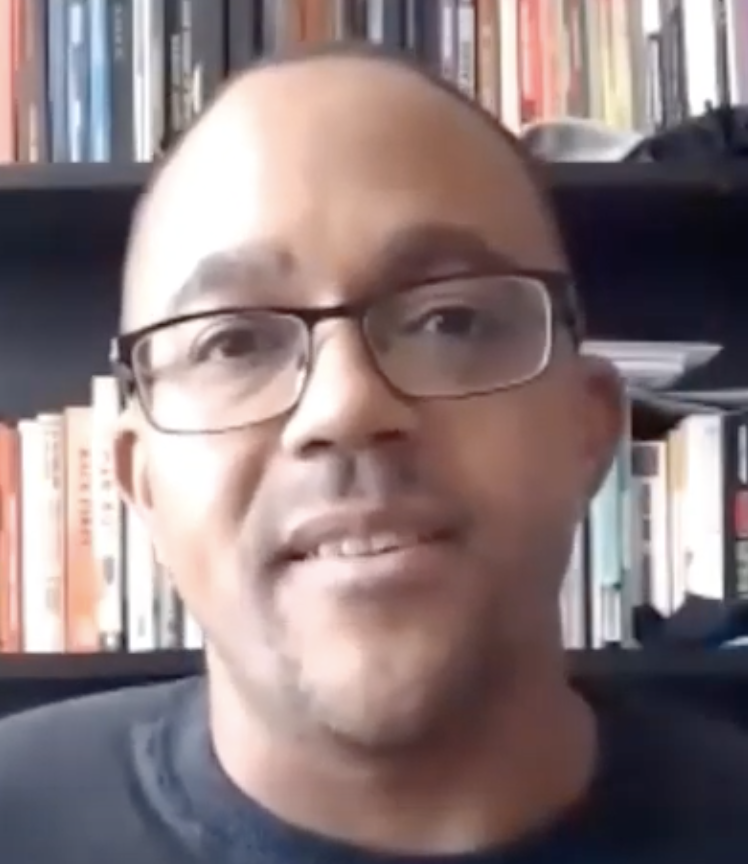
Kehinde Andrews, United Kingdom

Following the rise and decline of Black British Cultural Studies between the early 1980s and late 1990s, Black studies in the United States reinvigorated Black Critical Thought in the United Kingdom. Kehinde Andrews, who initiated the development of the Black Studies Association in the United Kingdom as well as the development of a course in Black studies at Birmingham City University, continues to advocate for the advancement of the presence of Black studies in the United Kingdom.

== Research methods ==
=== African Self-Consciousness ===
Kobi K. K. Kambon developed a research method and psychological framework, known as African Self-Consciousness, which analyzes the states and changes of the African mind.

=== Africana Womanism ===
Delores P. Aldridge developed a research method, which analyzes from the viewpoint of black women, known as Africana Womanism. Rather than the importance of the individual (e.g., needs, wants) being considered greater than the family unit, the importance of the family unit is regarded as greater than the individual.

=== Afrocentricity ===
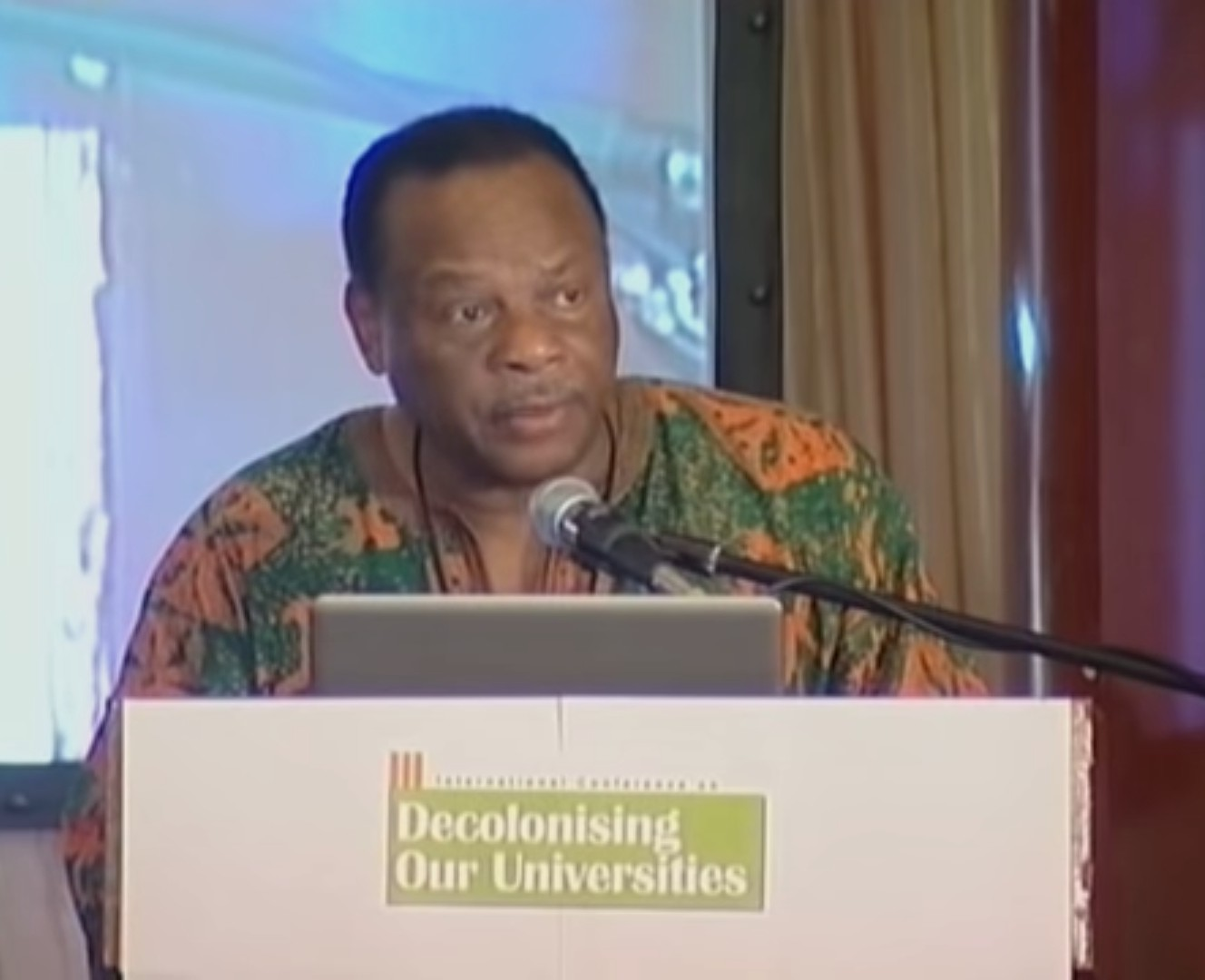
Molefi Kete Asante, United States

Afrocentricity is an academic theory and approach to scholarship that seeks to center the experiences and peoples of Africa and the African diaspora within their own historical, cultural, and sociological contexts. First developed as a systematized methodology by Molefi Kete Asante in 1980, he drew inspiration from a number of African and African diaspora intellectuals including Cheikh Anta Diop, George James, Harold Cruse, Ida B. Wells, Langston Hughes, Malcolm X, Marcus Garvey, and W. E. B. Du Bois. The Temple Circle, also known as the Temple School of Thought, Temple Circle of Afrocentricity, or Temple School of Afrocentricity, was an early group of Africologists during the late 1980s and early 1990s that helped to further develop Afrocentricity, which is based on concepts of agency, centeredness, location, and orientation.

=== Black Male Studies ===
Black Male Studies primarily focuses on the study of Black men and boys. Its research focus includes the study of Black manhood and Black masculinity, and it draws from disciplines such as history, philosophy, and sociology. Black Male Studies uses a Black male-centered paradigm designed to critique past and present gender studies publications on Black males as well as centers and contends with the problem of anti-Black misandry ("disdain for Black men and boys"). Past and present gender studies publications tend to carry assumptions of Black men and boys being criminals and assailants of Black women and white women. Consequently, past and present gender studies publications tend to contain paradigms, theories, and narratives that are grounded in anti-Black misandry, along with a theoretically constructed language of hypermasculinity, and tend to be ill-equipped at understanding Black males as victims. The past and present vulnerability of Black males, ranging from rape, to sexual abuse, to death, which tends to be overlooked and downplayed by rhetoric about hypermasculinity, underscores the need to develop new language, narratives, and theories for understanding Black males.

=== Blues Culture ===
James B. Stewart developed the research method and methodological framework, known as Blues Culture, which examines the traits (e.g., versatility, vibration) of Africana culture utilizing various means from an assortment of disciplines (e.g., economics, history, sociology).

=== Double Consciousness ===
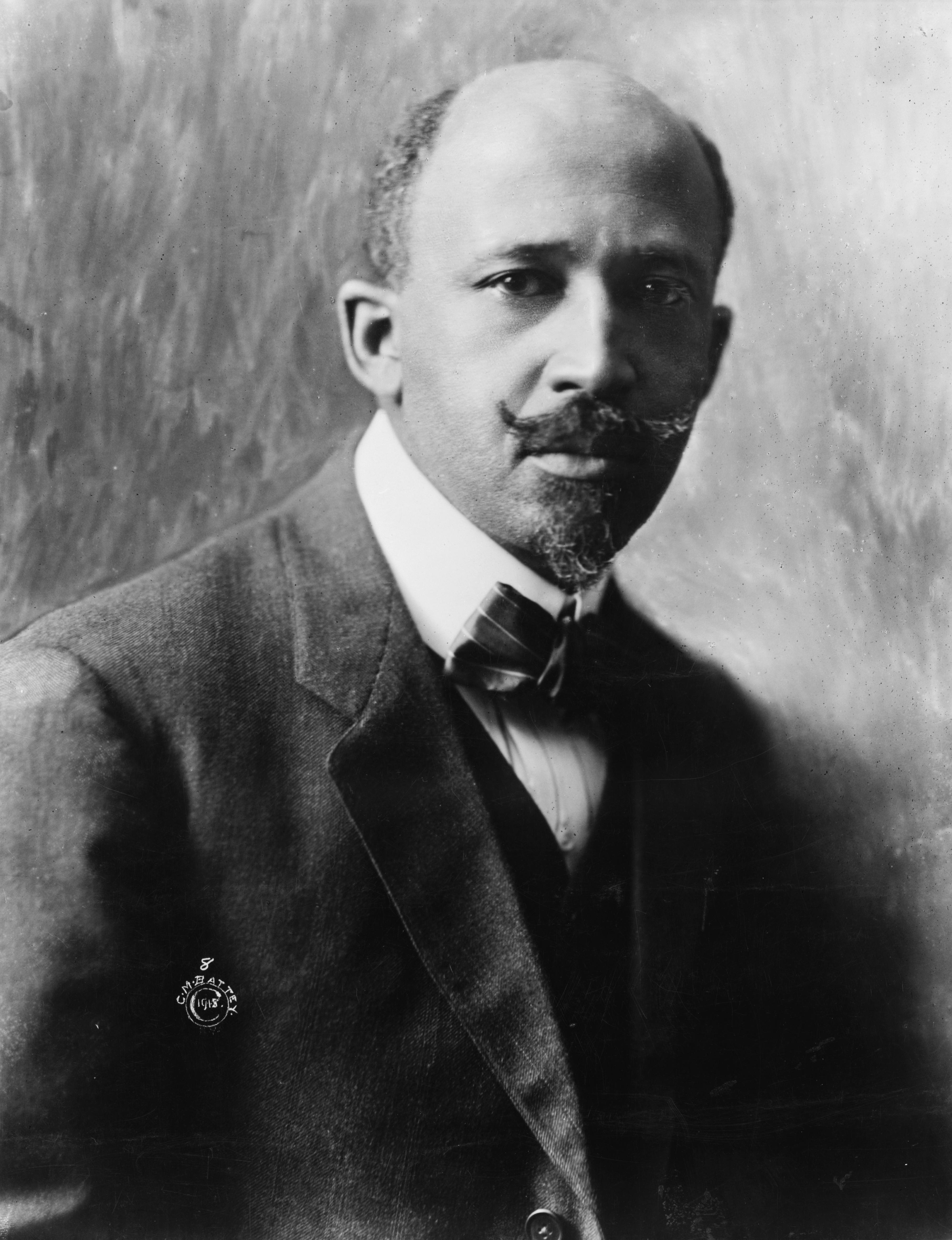
W. E. B. Du Bois, United States

W. E. B. DuBois developed the research method and conceptual framework, known as Double Consciousness, to analyze how Africana people (and phenomena) exist in a dual racialized (black-white) world and subsequently develop a dual consciousness. Rather than succumb to various forms of external pressure (e.g., assimilation, harassment, prejudice, racism, sexism, surveillance), Africana people discover how to steer through them.

=== Four Basic Tasks of the Black Studies Scholar ===
James Turner developed the research method and social scientific framework, known as Four Basic Tasks of the Black Studies Scholar, which investigates the problems that affect the experiences of Africana peoples and addresses four related criteria (e.g., defend, disseminate, generate, preserve new knowledge) utilizing various means of examination from an assortment of disciplines (e.g., conceptual history, economics, political science, sociology).

=== Interpretative Analysis ===
Charles H. Wesley developed the research method of Interpretative Analysis, which utilizes a structural or cultural system to gather, analyze, and interpret data.

=== Kawaida Theory ===
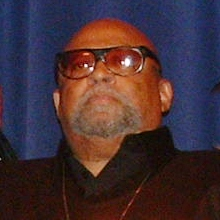
Maulana Karenga, United States

Maulana Karenga drew from the concept of Nguzo Saba to develop his research method, known as Kawaida Theory. Seven factors (e.g., creative production, ethos, history, religion, economic organization, political organization, social organization) are utilized to examine the Africana experience, which is set within a Pan-Africanist context.

=== Miseducation of the Negro ===
Carter G. Woodson developed the research method of and conceptual framework for the Miseducation of the Negro, which analyzes and assesses the history and culture of Africana people, and notates their notable loss of such is due to Africana people being decentered from their own historic and cultural contexts.

=== Nigrescence ===
William E. Cross Jr. developed the research method, known as Nigrescence, as a psychological framework; with the framework, he analyzes Africana culture and the behavioral dimensions of its psycho-adaptive traits as well as analyzes a timeline of Black culture (which is composed of five steps).

=== Optimal Worldview of Psychology ===
Linda Meyers developed the research method, known as the Optimal Worldview of Psychology, which utilizes investigates the African mind through a cultural framework (e.g., surface-level structure of culture, deep structure of culture); its sub-optimal viewpoint highlights the demerits of an African mind that has an assimilated mentality and its optimal viewpoint corresponds with an African mind that has an Africana mentality.

=== Paradigm of Unity ===
Abdul Alkalimat developed the research method known as the Paradigm of Unity, which has a considerable focus on relationships between social classes, via Marxist analysis, and utilizes gender as a determining factor as well as utilizes an undefined notion of Afrocentricity.

=== Shared Authority ===
Michael Frisch developed the research method, known as Shared Authority, to investigate orature, which recognizes the personhood (e.g., subject, agency) and experiences of the Africana individual. Through this methodological recognition, information that may not have been captured in prior publications is able to be optimally acquired.

=== Social Legitimacy ===
Winston Van Horn developed a research method and methodological framework (composed of three steps), known as Social Legitimacy, which analyzes the experiences of Africana peoples and Africana phenomena in their political and sociological contexts.

=== Two Cradle Theory ===
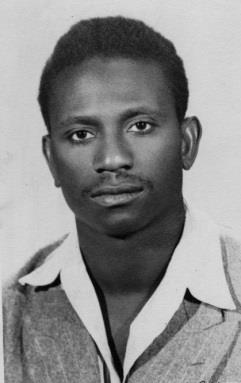
Cheikh Anta Diop, Senegal

Cheikh Anta Diop drew from anthropology, archaeology, history, and sociology to develop a research method and cultural metric, known as Two Cradle Theory, to assess the differences between African and European cultures – between what are characterized and viewed as the southern cradle and the northern cradle.

=== Ujimaa ===
James L. Conyers Jr. drew from the concept of Nguzo Saba to develop the research method known as Ujimaa; the methodological framework draws from philosophy, sociology, and conceptual history, with the understanding that culture is utilized to analyze and assess Pan-Africanist phenomena from around the world, and is utilized to analyze social responsibility and the work of the collective.

== Recent challenges and criticism ==
One of the major setbacks with Black studies programs or departments is that there is a lack of financial resources available to students and faculty. Many universities and colleges around the United States provided Black studies programs with small budgets and, therefore, it is difficult for the department to purchase materials and hire staff. Due to the budget allocated to Black studies being limited, some faculty are jointly appointed, therefore, causing faculty to leave their home disciplines to teach a discipline with which they may not be familiar. Budgetary issues make it difficult for Black studies programs and departments to function and to promote themselves.

Racism, perpetrated by many administrators, is alleged to hinder the institutionalization of Black studies at major universities. As with the case of UC Berkeley, most of the Black studies programs across the country were instituted because of the urging and demanding of black students to create the program. In many instances, black students also called for the increased enrollment of black students and financial assistance to these students. Also seen in the case of UC Berkeley is the constant demand to have such a program, but place the power of control in the hands of black people. The idea was that Black studies could not be "realistic" if it were taught by someone who was not accustomed to the black experience. On many campuses, directors of Black studies have little to no autonomy—they do not have the power to hire or grant tenure to faculty. On many campuses, an overall lack of respect for the discipline has caused instability for the students and for the program.

In the past thirty years, there has been a steady decline of Black studies scholars.

== Universities and colleges with Black studies departments, programs, and courses ==
Brazil

- Pontifical Catholic University of São Paulo

Canada

- Brock University
- Concordia University
- Dalhousie University
- Queen's University
- York University

Caribbean

- University of the Virgin Islands
- University of the West Indies

Colombia

- National University of Colombia
- Pontifical Xavierian University
- University of Cauca

Ecuador

- Simón Bolívar Andean University

United Kingdom

- Birmingham City University

United States

- American University
- Amherst College
- Bowdoin College
- Baruch College
- Brandeis University
- Brown University
- California State University, Dominguez Hills
- California State University, Fullerton
- California State University, Northridge
- Carleton College
- Cleveland State University
- College of William and Mary
- Columbia University
- Dartmouth College
- Davidson College
- DePaul University
- Dominican University
- Duke University
- Eastern Kentucky University
- Eastern Michigan University
- Emory University
- Fordham University
- Georgetown University
- Georgia State University
- Guilford College
- Hunter College
- Indiana University
- Kent State University
- Oberlin College
- Ohio State University
- Landmark College
- Loyola Marymount University
- Luther College
- Middle Tennessee State University
- Mount Holyoke College
- Nassau Community College
- Northwestern University
- Pennsylvania State University
- Portland State University
- Princeton University
- Purdue University
- Queens College
- Rutgers University
- San Jose State University
- Smith College
- Southern Illinois University
- Syracuse University
- Temple University
- The City College of New York
- The College of New Jersey
- Towson University
- Tufts University
- Tulane University
- University at Albany
- University of Arizona
- University of Arkansas
- University at Buffalo
- University of California, Berkeley
- University of California, Davis
- University of California, Irvine
- University of California, Los Angeles
- University of California, San Diego
- University of California, Santa Barbara
- University of Florida
- University of Houston
- University of Illinois Chicago
- University of Illinois Urbana-Champaign
- University of Kansas
- University of Louisville
- University of Maryland
- University of Massachusetts, Amherst
- University of Michigan
- University of Missouri
- University of Montana
- University of Nebraska at Omaha
- University of North Carolina at Chapel Hill
- University of North Carolina at Charlotte
- University of North Carolina at Greensboro
- University of North Texas
- University of Oklahoma
- University of Oregon
- University of Pennsylvania
- University of Puget Sound
- University of Rochester
- University of South Carolina
- University of Texas at Arlington
- University of Texas at Austin
- University of Virginia
- University of Wisconsin
- Valdosta State University
- Vassar College
- Virginia Commonwealth University
- Washington University in St. Louis
- Western Illinois University
- Wesleyan University
- Wright State University
- Yale University

Venezuela

- Universidad Politécnica Territorial de Barlovento Argelia Laya

=== Universities with Ph.D. programs in Black studies ===
United States

- Brown University
- Columbia University
- Cornell University
- Harvard University
- Indiana University
- Michigan State University
- Northwestern University
- Ohio State University
- Pennsylvania State University
- Temple University
- University of California, Berkeley
- University of Louisville
- University of Massachusetts, Amherst
- University of Pennsylvania
- University of Texas at Austin
- University of Wisconsin–Milwaukee
- Yale University

== Prominent academics ==
Africa

- Micere Mugo

Brazil

- Lélia Gonzalez
- Abdias Nascimento
- Beatriz Nascimento

Caribbean

- Carole Boyce Davies
- Horace Campbell
- Oliver Cromwell Cox
- Elsa Goveia
- C. L. R. James
- Walter Rodney
- Kwame Ture
- Sylvia Wynter

United Kingdom

- Kehinde Andrews
- Kwame Anthony Appiah
- Hazel Carby
- Paul Gilroy

United States

- Abdul Alkalimat
- Shawn Alexander
- Molefi Kete Asante
- M. K. Asante Jr.
- Houston A. Baker Jr.
- Robert Chrisman
- Bill Cole
- Patricia Hill Collins
- Edward W. Crosby
- Tommy J. Curry
- Allison Davis
- Angela Y. Davis
- St. Clair Drake
- W. E. B. Du Bois
- Michael Eric Dyson
- Gerald Early
- John Hope Franklin
- E. Franklin Frazier
- Henry Louis Gates Jr.
- Farah Griffin
- Vincent Harding
- Nathan Hare
- Melissa Harris-Perry
- Saidiya Hartman
- Melville Herskovits
- Lena Hill
- bell hooks
- Charles S. Johnson
- Maulana Karenga
- Robin D. G. Kelley
- Glenn C. Loury
- Manning Marable
- Janis Mayes
- Fred Moten
- Mark Anthony Neal
- Adolph Reed
- Cedric Robinson
- Tricia Rose
- Milton Sernett
- Christina Sharpe
- Tracy Denean Sharpley-Whiting
- Renate Simson
- Geneva Smitherman
- Robert B. Stepto
- Conrad Tillard
- Akinyele Umoja
- Cornel West
- William Julius Wilson
- Carter G. Woodson
- Cynthia A. Young

== Scholarly and academic journals ==
- African American Review
- Africana – Journal of Ideas on Africa and the Diaspora
- Africana Online: Journal of the Africana Center for Cultural Literacy and Research
- Africology: The Journal of Pan African Studies (since 1987)
- Afro-Americans in New York Life and History (since 1976)
- The Black Scholar (since 1969)
- Callaloo
- Electronic Journal of Africana Bibliography – coverage includes any aspect of Africa, its peoples, their homes, cities, towns, districts, states, countries, regions, including social, economic sustainable development, creative literature, the arts, and the Diaspora.
- The Griot: The Journal of African American Studies
- International Journal of Africana Studies – designed to interrogate and analyze the lived experiences of Africana people.
- The Journal of African Civilizations (since 1979)
- Journal of African American History
- Journal of African American Males in Education (JAAME)
- Journal of Black Studies
- Journal of Negro Education
- Journal of Negro History
- Western Journal of Black Studies
- Negro Digest
- Negro Educational Review
- Negro History Bulletin
- Nka: Journal of Contemporary African Art – focuses on publishing critical work that examines the newly developing field of contemporary African and African Diaspora art within the modernist and postmodernist experience, thereby contributing to the intellectual dialogue on world art and the discourse on internationalism and multiculturalism in the arts.
- Phylon
- Race & Class
- Souls: A Critical Journal of Black Politics, Culture, and Society
- Transition Magazine

== See also ==
- AP African American Studies
- Critical race theory
- Whiteness studies
