= Department of African American Studies (Syracuse University) =

Academic Department at Syracuse University in Syracuse, New York, U.S.

- Established: 1979; 47 years ago
- Parent institution: Syracuse University
- Affiliations: Community folk Art Center, Paul Robeson Performing Arts Company Inc, Africa Initiative - Syracuse University, MLK Jr Library
- Location: Syracuse, New York, United States
- Website: aas.syr.edu

The Department of African American Studies (AAS) at Syracuse University is an academic department supporting Africana studies. It is located at Syracuse University in Syracuse, New York. It is part of the Syracuse University College of Arts and Sciences. The Department supports an external community based unit that is a part of the department and has played a central role in shaping culture and arts in the Syracuse city community - Community Folk Art Center (CFAC). It has also supported the Paul Robeson Performing Arts Company (PRPAC) in the past. These are both independent units that were housed or founded by the department The department also houses the award-winning library, the Martin Luther King Jr. Memorial Library. It currently oversees the internationally recognized university wide initiative "Africa Initiative". Its other projects include the nationally recognized "Paris Noir" and the Ford Foundation Environmental Justice and Gender Project. It has had a long history of activism within the university, surrounding community, and abroad through its strong international network. The AAS department has housed many renowned scholars in African, Afro-Caribbean, African-American, Afro-Latin American, and Afro-European studies.

== History ==
The AAS department was created in the spirit of revolutionary thinking. Syracuse students were among the first in the United States to rebel against institutionalized injustices in education in the 1960s. When Ernie Davis became the first Black football player to win the Heisman Trophy in 1961, it was a major landmark for progress for African Americans in higher education. Syracuse alumnus Joe Biden noted in a tribute speech in 2011, that Ernie Davis "gave a whole group of people hope". Subsequently, racial discord in the football program began to be highlighted, which resulted in an increase in racial tension. This tension began in 1969 when a group known as the "Syracuse 8" highlighted the discrimination they faced in football by coach Floyd "Ben" Schwartzwalder. By the opening pre-game of the season, tensions were so high that they resulted in a confrontation between nearly 100 policemen and at least 400 students at the football stadium at Syracuse University.

Due to increasing racial tension and in response to the civil rights movement, in 1968, Black students at Syracuse University staged a protest outside of S. I. Newhouse School of Public Communications, demanding that the university offer Black Studies classes that highlighted and included the intellectual, historical and cultural contributions of African Americans. The administration at Syracuse University subsequently began to make concessions by offering Black Studies classes as an elective. African American Studies (AAS) began as a program in 1972 and then became a department as part of the College of Arts and Sciences in 1979. The 1960s student protests also resulted in an Afro-American Cultural center and marked the beginning of the MLK library collection. The first conference on Critical Issues in Afro-American and African Studies was held at Syracuse University in 1976.

During the 1980s, Syracuse students again advocated the administration to widen the pool of African American faculty applicants, hire a department chairperson and in order to increase the staff in the AAS department. The department has stayed without a chair and other key positions for more than a year. Members of the Syracuse African-American Students Association (SAS) were at the forefront of this movement. In 1989, 120 SAS member students confronted Chancellor Melvin Eggers at a round table meeting in order to air their grievances. The group's efforts led to a 400-student protest in 1990 led by SAS President Quentin Stith. The students also advocated for a program that allowed all students (not just those of African-American descent) to learn about the contribution of African Americans in American history. The students were concerned with preserving Black identity and saw their dedication towards African studies as a collective struggle. Throughout the 1980s, students continued to play an active role on the university campus.

The department has now developed into a program that offers interdisciplinary study of linkages between Africa and the African Diaspora.

== AAS auxiliary units ==
=== Community Folk Art Center (CFAC) ===
CFAC is an extension (unit) of AAS founded in 1972 by Herbert T. Williams and Harry Morgan that aims at showcasing Black art and artists from underrepresented groups. It hosts exhibitions, films, artist workshops, art classes, and dance performances for the community and students. It is housed with the Paul Robeson Performing Arts Company, Inc. (PRPAC) and serves as an artistic hub in the Syracuse community. Past exhibits at the Community Folk Art Gallery include works by Palmer Hayden Projects also include oral history programs in Syracuse.

=== Paul Robeson Performing Arts Company (PRPAC) ===
A former unit of AAS, the Paul Robeson Performing Arts Company, Inc. (PRPAC) was founded by William H. Rowland and Roy Delemos in 1982 as a non-profit performing arts company. It was founded as a non-profit performing arts company in Syracuse. It was named after African-American concert singer, recording artist, athlete, actor, and activist Paul Robeson. It became a part of the university and AAS in 1989 and has worked at improving art education on the Syracuse university campus and in the Syracuse community.

== Academics ==
AAS offers students opportunities for academic study, research, community involvement and study abroad. The department's interdisciplinary curriculum enables students to engage, analyze and create knowledge involving African Americans, and make linkages with areas of Latin America, the Caribbean and continental Africa.

=== Gender and Environmental Justice Focus ===
The Department received a Ford Foundation grant in order to support the development of gender and environmental justice in Africana studies nationally. The project is entitled "Gender and Environmental Justice," and makes AAS the only department of its kind in the nation to recognize the importance of environmental justice in its curriculum. The Ford Foundation also awarded support towards a postdoctoral program focusing on civic engagement in the arts, public humanities, architecture and the media. The Ford Foundation grant facilitated a Black feminist lecture series "Black Feminism and Environmental Justice" lecture series, research grants, Community Mapping and Photovoice Research project, and symposiums for Black women and other minorities.

=== Undergraduate Studies - African American Studies ===
The department offers a major and minor in African American studies that is interdisciplinary and focuses on international studies. The undergraduate studies program focuses on community involvement and on building an international experience for students. It has pioneered groundbreaking study abroad programs such as "Paris Noir", "Beyond the Beach:The Caribbean as a Place, Not just Playground", and a study abroad programs centered on Black Austria (University of Graz) and Zimbabwe.

=== Graduate Studies - Pan African Studies ===
The Masters in Pan African Studies Program began as a unique program in Black Studies in the United States in both its design and delivery. In 2005, it was considered an innovative program that has an emphasis in the area studies of Africa, the Caribbean and the United States. Whereas most programs concentrate on history and biographies, it instead focuses on the linkages between Africa and the African Diaspora from a multi-disciplinary approach involving cultural, social scientific, political, economic and environmental perspectives. It also provides for intellectual inquiry into philosophy of Pan Africanism and Pan Africanism as a historical, cultural, and contemporary movement. It is the only masters program in Pan African studies that focuses on field research and theory. The Program has an experiential component through affiliations that the department has with institutions abroad that leads to all students studying in Africa, the Caribbean, Canada, or African American sites.

== Africa Initiative ==
The AAS department views Africa as an integral part of its scholarly vision and mission. The Africa Initiative (AI) is located in the department of African American studies and was launched in 2001 with a goal of focusing on Africa. AI aims at spearheading revitalized interest in Africa, which has declined in many United States institutions of higher learning since the end of the "Cold War. Its aim is to also address Africa's silencing, marginalization and stereotyping. It also aims to revitalize interest in Africa as an area of study after the decline of the East African Studies Program at Syracuse University which initiated projects including the Eduardo Mondlane Lecture Series. The East African program had also been instrumental in spearheading an east African library collection at Syracuse's Bird Library that includes the Kenyan and Tanzanian national archives (one of the few collections of these archives in the United States).

=== Eduardo Mondlane Brown Bag Lecture Series ===
AI administers the "Eduardo Mondlane Memorial Lecture Series". The lecture series was named after the founder of Front for the Liberation of Mozambique (FRELIMO), Eduardo Mondlane, who was also a former professor at Syracuse University. In recent years, it has become more important in keeping a focus on topical issue on Africa in academia. The lecture series was originally administered by the East African Studies Program at Syracuse University that is now dissolved For several years, this interactive series has brought scholars, students, and the community together to discuss pertinent issues concerning Africa to the university. It is during one of these lecture series on February 20, 1970, that Guinea-Bissau nationalist Amílcar Cabral delivered his famous speech "National Liberation and Culture" at Syracuse University. Other notable speakers in the series have included UN Ambassador to Rwanda Stanilas Kamanzi(2003), Ethiopian Ambassador Kasshun Ayele, and writer Veronique Tadjo, Dr. Efemini Andrew, and Jerome Verdier, the chairman of the Truth and Reconciliation Commission in Liberia.

=== Symposia and conferences ===
AI periodically hosts major symposia and conferences. In the past, this included the WEB Du Bois and The Crisis Magazine Symposia and International Human Rights Celebration.

== Martin Luther King Jr. Memorial Library ==
The MLK library was founded by the Syracuse student organization SAAS (Student African American Society) in 1968. It is currently one of the few university libraries in the country that has an entire library with a dedicated African-American collection It consists of video, art, non-print titles, books and journals. It has a special collection, the Harriet Tubman collection. The materials also include special acquisitions for the Africa collection, Caribbean collection, Afro-European collection and Afro-Central American collection.

== Notable forums, projects and colloquia ==
- MLK Jr Lectures: The colloquium brings speakers to the campus and past speakers have included Mary Frances Berry, and Jayne Cortez.
- Black feminist lecture series: Since 2007, a feminist lecture series has brought notable speakers to the campus, including Patricia McFadden, Nellie Hester-Bailey, Carole Boyce Davies.
- Other notable guest speakers include: Merle Collins, Manning Marable, David Driscoll, Sonia Sanchez
- The AAS department sponsored Wole Soyinka's play Death and the King's Horseman
- AAS is working with the Syracuse-based Dunbar Center and the Onondaga Historical Association to archive local black history and develop the oral history collection of Syracuse's black history through a mapping project.

== Publications ==
AAS used to publish an annual newsletter, Pan African Studies Newsletter, from 2003 to 2008, that focused on Black Studies and the department that is no longer published.

== Notable faculty ==
- Horace Campbell - political scientist, author
- Bill Cole - author, musicologist
- Linda Carty (sociologist) - activist, sociologist
- Kwame Dixon, political scientist
- Janis Mayes - author, literary critic
- Micere Mugo - activist, poet, playwright
- Milton Sernett - author, historian
- S.N. Sangmpam - political scientist, author
- Renate Simson - author

=== Distinguished visiting professors/faculty ===
- Angela Davis - American civil rights activist, author
- Patricia McFadden - Swazi sociologist, feminist

== Notable alumni ==
- Adolphus G. Belk, B.A. African American Studies, political scientist
- Pierce Freelon, MA Pan African Studies 08, musician
