= NCBS =

NCBS may refer to:

- National Centre for Biological Sciences, a research centre based in Bangalore, India
- National Council for Black Studies, an organization that promotes black studies based in Atlanta, United States
- National Counties Building Society, a building society based in Epsom, England
