= List of Hungarian explorers =

List of Hungarian explorers.

== List ==
Life	Portrait	Name	Main areas explored	Description
13th-century		Friar Julian	Volga Bulgaria, Bashkiria, Magna Hungaria	
c.1555–1583		Stephanus Parmenius	North America	He was a Hungarian scholar and humanist poet who traveled to Oxford and became involved in the English exploration of the New World. He joined Humphrey Gilbert's expedition to North America with the intention of writing a chronicle of the voyage and its discoveries. Parmenius reached Newfoundland, likely becoming the first Hungarian in the New World. However, he died on the return voyage in 1583 when his ship was lost at sea.
1746–1786		Móric Benyovszky	Northern Pacific Ocean	A Hungarian count, a military officer, adventurer, and writer. In 1769, while fighting for the Polish armies under the Bar Confederation, he was captured by the Russians and exiled to Kamchatka. He subsequently escaped and returned to Europe via Macau and Mauritius, arriving in France. In 1773, Benyovszky reached agreement with the French government to establish a trading post on Madagascar. Facing significant problems with the climate, the terrain, and the native Sakalava people, he abandoned the trading post in 1776. Benyovszky then returned to Europe, joined the Austrian Army and fought in the War of the Bavarian Succession. After a failed venture in Fiume (present-day Rijeka), he travelled to America and obtained financial backing for a second voyage to Madagascar. The French governor of Mauritius sent a small armed force to close down his operation, and Benyovszky was killed in 1786.
1784–1842		Sándor Kőrösi Csoma	Tibet	
1841–1916		Florence Baker	Africa	Hungarian-born British explorer. With Samuel Baker they went in search of the source of the River Nile and found Lake Albert. She later returned to Africa with her husband to try and put down the slave trade.
1845–1916		Sámuel Teleki	Africa	A Hungarian count, he led the first European expedition in northern Kenya discovering Lake Turkana, then Tanzania and Ethiopia. He was the first man to attempt climbing Mount Kilimanjaro, up to 5,300 feet (1,600 metres), and Mount Kenya, up to 4,300 feet (1,300 metres).
1862–1943		Aurel Stein	Central Asia	Hungarian-born British explorer
1867–1933		György Almásy	Danube Delta, river Ili, Issyk Kul, Tien-San	A Hungarian Asiologist, traveler, zoologist and ethnographer. His son, László Almásy, was an aviator, Afrologist and soldier.
1877–1933		Franz Nopcsa	Northern Albania	A Hungarian baron, adventurer, scholar, geologist, paleontologist and albanologist. He is widely regarded as one of the founders of paleobiology, and first described the theory of insular dwarfism. He was also a specialist on Albanian studies and completed the first geological map of northern Albania.
1895–1951		László Almásy	Africa	
