= King Library =

King Library may refer to:

- Martin Luther King, Jr. Library, several libraries
- King Library (Miami University) in Oxford, Ohio
- King Library, library located in Andalusia, Pennsylvania founded by Charles Ray King

== See also ==
- King's Library, collections of books and pamphlets from the Age of Enlightenment assembled by George III
