= Mae C. King =

American political scientist (1938–2022)

- Born: June 24, 1938; Lee County, Arkansas, U.S.
- Died: November 4, 2022 (aged 84); Montgomery County, Maryland, U.S.
- Education: Bishop College (BA); University of Idaho (MA, PhD)
- Scientific career
- Fields: Political science
- Workplaces: Texas Southern University; American Political Science Association; University of Benin; Howard University
- Thesis: Nonalignment and the United Nations: The Congo crisis, 1960-1961 (1968)

Mae Coates King (June 24, 1938 – November 4, 2022) was an American political scientist. She was a professor of political science at Howard University, and a professor emerita as of 2017. She conducted early studies on the politics and international relations of African states, particularly the international relations of Nigeria, as well as research on the history of the Congressional Black Caucus and the status of African American women in American politics.

King died in Montgomery County, Maryland on November 4, 2022, at the age of 84.

== Early life ==
King was born in a rural part of Lee County, Arkansas, on June 24, 1938, to a family with 5 sisters and 4 brothers. Her father was a farmer and a Baptist preacher, and her mother was a housewife. When she was 6 years old, her family moved to Aubrey, Arkansas.

=== Education ===
As an undergraduate, King attended Bishop College, a historically black college in Marshall, Texas. She earned her BA in 1960 in social studies, with a minor in history. She then received a National Defense Education Fellowship to study political science as a graduate student at the University of Idaho. In 1962, she completed an MA in political science there, writing her thesis on contemporary nationalism in Ghana. After completing her MA, she took a year off from graduate school to teach political science at Texas Southern University. She then returned to the University of Idaho for a PhD, which she earned in 1968 for work on the United Nations and the Congo Crisis.

=== Civil rights activism ===
During the late 1950s and early 1960s, King was a student activist involved in the civil rights movement. As a student at Bishop College, she became the Chair of the local chapter of the National Student Young Women's Christian Association. She received training from the Southern Christian Leadership Conference in nonviolent direct action, and became a leader of sit-ins to protest racial discrimination in Marshall, Texas. In March 1960, when she was 21 and a student at Bishop College, she was jailed alongside hundreds of other civil rights activists for their activism.

== Academic career ==
King was the first African American and the first woman to be a member of the professional staff of the American Political Science Association, which is the main professional body of political scientists in North America. There she led the Committee on the Status of Blacks in the Profession and the Committee on the Status of Women. In 1970, King worked with other African American political scientists including Jewel Prestage to found the National Conference of Black Political Scientists, partly because of the perception that the American Political Science Association had neglected the work of engaging black political scientists. She was also a founder or an early leader of the National Council of Negro Women and the African Studies Association, a Director of the African Heritage Studies Association, and a Vice President of the International Association of Black Professionals in International Affairs.

King went on what was originally meant to be a one-year sabbatical from American Political Science Association to Nigeria in 1975. There, she joined the department of political science at the University of Benin. This one-year sabbatical turned into a 14 year stay when she left that faculty in 1989. Upon return, King joined the political science department at Howard University, where she had previously taught.

In 1996, King published the book Basic currents of Nigerian foreign policy. This was said to be one of the first works of political science to systematically study the politics of African countries and the role of African states in the international system. King wrote the book to address a lack of comprehensive studies on the topic of Nigerian foreign policy and Nigeria's place in international relations, particularly for undergraduate and first year graduate students in political science. In 2020, Basic currents of Nigerian foreign policy was included on a list by Adolphus G. Belk, Jr., Robert C. Smith, and Sherri L. Wallace of "pioneering efforts" that "raised the profile of Black Politics research and inspired future Black academicians", which contributed to Black Politics being recognized as a legitimate area of scientific inquiry.

King's early interests in the Congressional black Caucus stemmed from her involvement in the first CBC dinner in 1971. This interest developed into research about the caucus. She studied of the history of the Congressional Black Caucus, and Sherri L. Wallace et al. termed "her groundbreaking interventions on Black women in politics". King was invited to share her contributions in a chapter of The Conscience of the Congress: How the Congressional Black Caucus Change America, Stephanie J. Jones, editor, 2012. Her article, titled “The Struggle for Change: the CBC and US Foreign Policy,” is featured to detail the work the Congressional Black Caucus has contributed to public policy when it had reached its 40-year mark.

== Recognition ==
King is the namesake for an award given by Association for the Study of Black Women in Politics. Each year, the Mae C. King Distinguished Paper Award on Women, Gender and Black Politics recognizes "the best paper presented by a political scientist on women, gender and Black Politics at a national or regional Political Science conference in the past academic year".

In a January 2020 review of the history of the National Conference of Black Political Scientists, written for the inaugural issue of the National Review of Black Politics, Sherri L. Wallace et al. wrote that King "has paved the way for a generation of Black political scientists generally, and Black female political scientists particularly", and that she "has made a significant contribution to the modern Black Liberation Movement, and to other fields of study, including African studies, Black studies, and Black women's studies".

== Selected works ==
- "Oppression and Power: The Unique Status of the Black Woman in the American Political System", Social Science Quarterly (1975)
- "The Politics of Sexual Stereotypes", Journal of Black Studies and Research (1982)
- Basic Currents of Nigerian Foreign Policy (1996)
