= The New Age of Empire =

Book on neo-colonialism

- Author: Kehinde Andrews
- Language: English
- Genre: Non-fiction
- Publisher: Allen Lane
- Publication date: 2021
- Publication place: United States

The New Age of Empire: How Racism and Colonialism Still Rule the World is a 2021 book written by black studies academic Kehinde Andrews.

== Overview ==
The book, authored by Kehinde Andrews, a Professor of Black Studies at Birmingham City University, discusses how the legacies of European imperialism and colonialism – both grounded in racism and white supremacy – have implications on modern-day neo-imperialist and neo-colonialist thought. This is prevalent in the attitudes and behaviours of non-governmental organizations such as the International Monetary Fund, World Bank and World Trade Organization, whose objectives are biased towards the ideals and goals of the Western world.

However, Andrews notes that colonial mindsets are not exclusively Western in nature, and argues that China is engaging in empire-building through its transactional relationship with various African nations.

== Reviews ==
In the magazine gal-dem, Adele Walton says Andrews dispels "self-congratulatory myths ... making clear that the Global North's ability to enjoy immense levels of private wealth are dependent on the continued exploitation of the Global South. By taking the reader on a journey from the Enlightenment period, to the Second World War to the rise of neoliberal hegemony under Margaret Thatcher and Ronald Reagan, Andrews reveals how even though racism and colonialism have taken on new forms, they remain at the core of the system of globalised capitalism we see today."

In the LSE Review of Books, Ayşe Işın Kirenci said called the book "a compact and comprehensive resource for those interested in development and colonialism studies who are looking for more critical perspectives on some of the orthodoxies in the political economy literature. Through its historical institutionalist approach, the study challenges the grand narratives of the Enlightenment, Western linear progress and developmentalism."

In the Evening Standard, Calvin Robinson calls Andrew's book "a fantastical journey through a parallel universe" whereby "everything and everyone is racist, there is no solution, and we should all subscribe to the principles of Critical Race Theory". He also criticises the "underlying Marxism" he sees inherent in the work.

Although describing the book as having shortcomings, Ashish Ghadiali in The Guardian says that Andrews is building on "the intellectual legacy of Cedric Robinson" and standing on the shoulders of giants of black radical politics, "from WEB Du Bois to Ava DuVernay, and delivers a book destined to serve as a kind of primary text for a new generation of students of antiracism looking to get to grips with the violence of our imperial inheritance, in broad-brush terms."
