= György Almásy =

Hungarian Asiologist, traveler, zoologist, and ethnographer

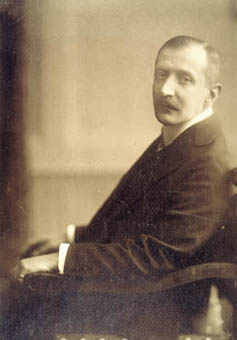
György Almásy

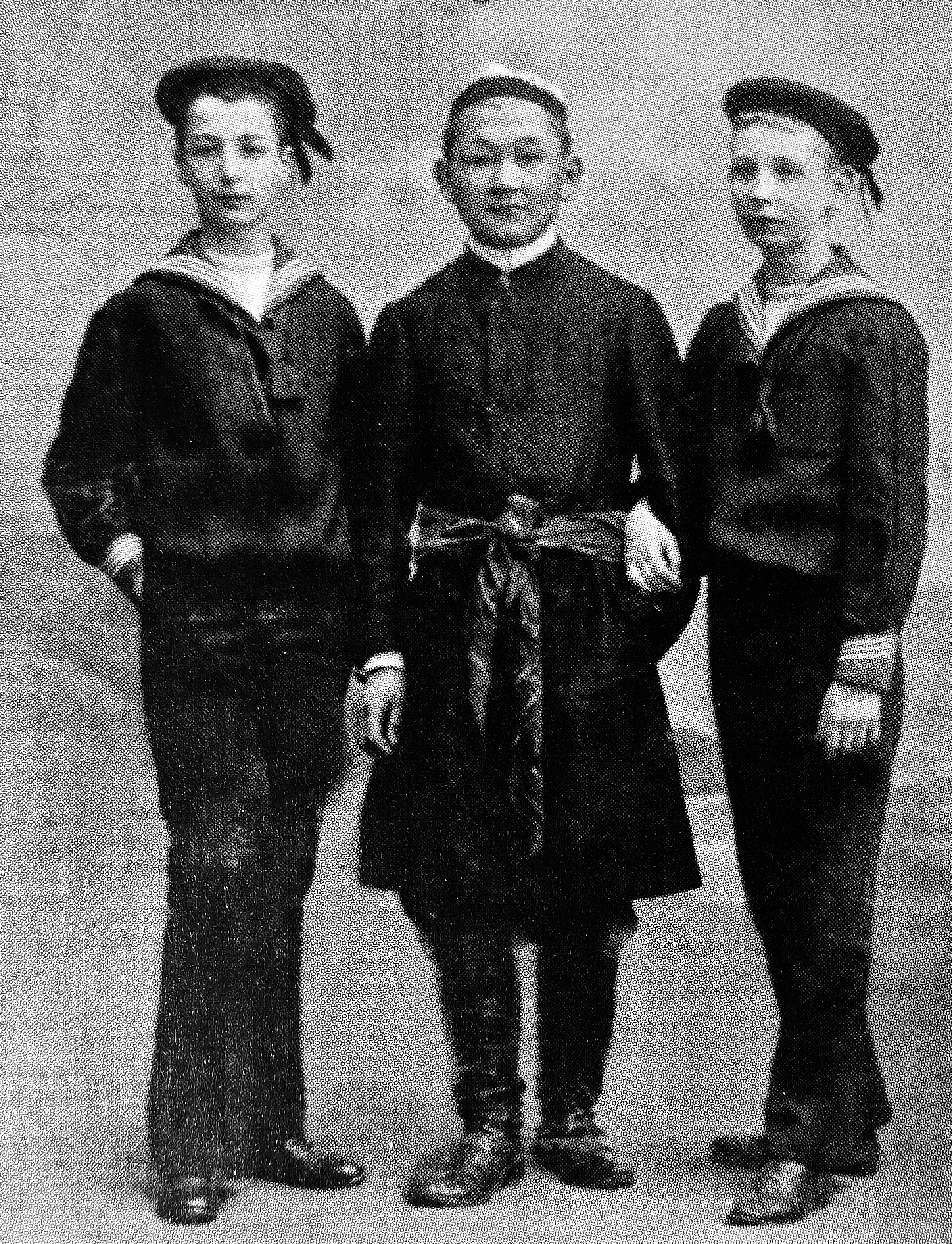
Sons of György Almásy with Turgan Berdike-úlu

György Ede Almásy de Zsadány et Törökszentmiklós (11 August 1867 – 23 September 1933) was a Hungarian Asiologist, traveler, zoologist and ethnographer. His son, László Almásy, was an aviator, Afrologist and soldier.

== Life ==
Almásy was born in Felsőlendva (now Grad, Slovenia). His father, Ede Almásy, was a founding member of the Hungarian Geographical Society. György Almásy studied for a law doctorate at the University of Graz, as customary for his status in society. After university he worked in Budapest as a civil servant, but after leaving his profession he returned home to manage his estate. He was interested from the beginning in zoology and, within that, ornithology. He published a book with István Chernel as co-editor. His first more serious journey was taken to the Danube Delta to study ornithology.

On 3 December 1891 he married Ilona Pittani, by whom he had three children: Györgyike, born in Borostyánkõ on 25 September 1892 and married to Antal Gyömörey de Gyömöre et Teölvár, János (Kőszeg (Güns), 7 March/September 1893 – Borostyánkõ (Bernstein im Burgenland), 21 August 1968), married at Gyuleviz Castle (Zsira) on 1 June 1929 to Princess Mária Róza Alojzia Alexa Paulina Esterházy de Galántha (Eisenstadt/Kis-Marton, 25 January 1900 – Bernstein, Burgenland, 30 November 1971), without issue, and László Almásy.

He first travelled to Asia in 1900 with Rudolf Stummer of Traunfels, his teacher of zoology at the University of Graz. They journeyed through the region of the river Ili, the eastern areas of the Issyk Kul, and the unexplored, third mountain range of the Tien-San. The zoological achievement of their journey was the collection of around 20,000 animals (mostly birds), with many newly discovered species among them. This tour gave him extensive experience, but rather than from his zoological observation, this experience was derived from his vivid ethnographical notations, which are concerned with the everyday life of the Kyrgyz and Kazakh peoples.

Gyula Prinz took a part in this journey, but disagreements with Almásy led to them going their own ways and they made independent, but valuable, observations (Prinz's My Journeys in Central Asia give vivid descriptions of the things they saw).

Almásy came home disappointed from his last journey, from this point onwards he lived withdrawn on his land. His journal and letters sent to his wife tell the rest of the story, but these unfortunately have not been published. His knowledge of the Russians and Turks made it possible to better understand and communicate with Russian officials and Kyrgyz tribal chiefs during his travels.

He published an important variant of the Kyrgyz epic of "Manas" about a farewell meeting between the hero Manas and his two-month-old child, Semetei. His article included a Latin transcription, and German translation, of the Kyrgyz-language text of the episode. He died in Graz.

== Contributions ==
György Almásy's field work and descriptive writings about them constitute his highest achievement. Later, he primarily made ethnographical and oriental studies; these found readership in the Ethnographical Bulletin and Bernát Munkácsy's journal. His collected works on the Kyrgyz, which the Néprajzi Múzeum holds, have played a part in ethnographical exhibitions.

== Works ==
- Madártani betekintés a román Dobrudzsába (Ornithological investigation into the Romanian Dobruja). Budapest, 1898.
- Utazásom orosz Turkesztánba (My Journey to Russian Turkestan). Budapest, 1903.
- Vándor-utam Ázsia szívébe (My Travels to the Heart of Asia). Budapest, Természettudományi Könyvkiadó-vállalat, 1903.

== Literature on him ==
- Асанов У.А., Джуманазарова А.З., Чоротегин Т.К. Кыргызская наука в лицах: Краткий исторический и био-библиографический свод / Отв. ред. академик У.А.Асанов. – Бишкек: Центр госязыка и энциклопедии, 2002. – 544 стр., илл. – ISBN 5-89750-142-4
- Sántha, István, and Dávid Somfai Kara, Levelek és fényképek Ázsia szívéből: Almásy György második közép-ázsiai kutatóútja (1906) (Lakitelek: Antológia Kiadó, 2021). ISBN 9786155862809.
- Sántha, István, and László Lajtai, 'Hungarian orientalism as seen through the photographs of György Almásy's second expedition to the Kazakh and Kyrgyz territories', in Photographing Central Asia: From the Periphery of the Russian Empire to Global Presence, ed. Svetlana Gorschenina, Sergei Abashin, Bruno de Cordier, Tatiana Saburova (Berlin/Boston: de Gruyter), pp. 129–164. doi:10.1515/9783110754469-005
