= Kehinde Andrews =

British academic and author (born 1983)

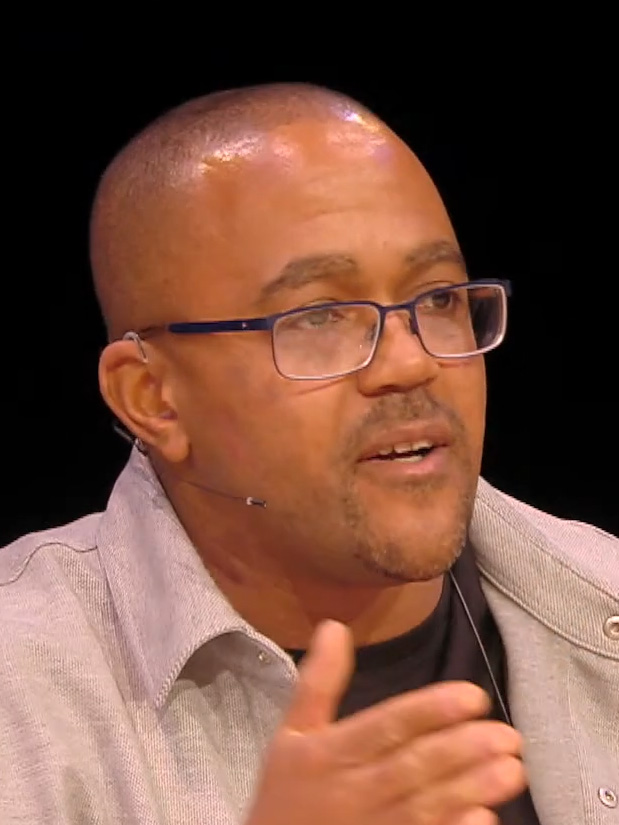
- Andrews in 2021
- Born: Kehinde Nkosi Andrews; January 1983 (age 43)
- Education: University of Birmingham
- Occupations: Academic, author
- Known for: First Black studies professor in the UK

Kehinde Nkosi Andrews (born January 1983) is a British academic and author specialising in Black studies. He was the first Black studies professor in the United Kingdom.

== Early life and education ==
Andrews is of British African-Caribbean heritage. He grew up in Birmingham, the son of a half-white English, half-Jamaican mother who was a university graduate and was born in Britain, and a Jamaican father who had come to the UK in his early teens. Andrews earned a PhD degree in sociology and cultural studies from the University of Birmingham in 2011. His thesis was titled Back to Black: Black Radicalism and the Supplementary School Movement.

== Academic career ==
Andrews was a professor of Black studies in the School of Social Sciences at Birmingham City University, having intimated in August 2026 during an appearance on the Radio 4 Today programme that he had been made redundant from this role. He is the director of the Centre for Critical Social Research, founder of the Harambee Organisation of Black Unity, and co-chair of the UK Black Studies Association. Andrews is the first Black Studies professor in the UK and led the establishment of the first Black Studies programme in Europe at Birmingham City University.

== Journalism, media appearances, and personal views ==
Andrews regularly appears in the media discussing issues of race and racism, colonialism and slavery, and British nationalism. He contributes to The Guardian, The Independent, New Statesman, CNN, openDemocracy, and often appears as a guest on the BBC and Good Morning Britain.

In 2016, Andrews criticised universities in the United Kingdom for institutional racism, specifically the lack of diversity in students' assigned readings.

In 2019, Andrews appeared on Good Morning Britain, on which he argued that the Royal Air Force bombing of Nazi Germany constituted a war crime and equated the racial views of Winston Churchill to those of Adolf Hitler.

Andrews narrated the 2018 film The Psychosis of Whiteness, which explores race and racism through cinematic representations of the slave trade.

In July 2019, Andrews criticised the idea that prominent non-white members of the Conservative Party automatically represent racial progress, saying that "a cabinet packed with ministers with brown skin wearing Tory masks represents the opposite of racial progress".

In 2020, he was interviewed by the Los Angeles Review of Books, discussing Malcolm X and the question of violence in Black radicalism.

In June 2021, Andrews described Elizabeth II as "the number one symbol of white supremacy in the entire world". Following her death in September 2022, he called for the abolition of the monarchy.

In September 2024, Black political commenter Calvin Robinson reported Andrews to the police for allegedly using a racial slur against him. The professor was investigated by the West Midlands Police, which, following a voluntary interview with Andrews during which he explained his academic work, dropped the probe. In an interview with The Independent, Andrews said, "'house negro' is a political critique and has never been used as a racial slur" and criticised the police for "criminalising Black and brown people" and the criminalisation of Black thought. Months before the police investigation, the Metropolitan Police had contacted Andrews for advice for a Crown Prosecution Service (CPS) review for an investigation into an alleged hate crime, in which a British Asian woman held a placard depicting Rishi Sunak and Suella Braverman as coconuts. Andrews declined to take part in the review, explained to the police why he believed this use of "coconut" was not a racial slur, and urged the police and CPS to drop the investigation. The police and CPS pursued the conviction but the woman was found not guilty.

While critiquing books written by academics as a "con", Andrews said the work of many academics is "devastatingly bad" and stated one of his peers had written something so bad that "he writes like he has a brain injury".

On 6 August 2026, Andrews appeared on the Radio 4 Today programme, defending the black professor Jason Arday, who had been subject to significant controversy over plagiarism.

In a September 2025 Triggernometry debate, Andrews advanced the claim that West Africans reached the Americas before Columbus, citing the Olmec heads and alleged evidence of West African substances in ancient Latin American tombs. He claimed that Africa had been "ahead of Europe" before the slave trade, and that slavery "weakened [Afrika] to the point where in the 19th century European countries can take over". Some of his claims on the slave trade were contradicted in the debate.

== Selected works ==
- Resisting Racism: Race, Inequality, and the Black Supplementary School Movement. London: Institute of Education Press. 2013. ISBN 9781858565156. OCLC 952965547.
- Back to Black: Retelling Black Radicalism for the 21st Century. London: Zed Books. 2018. ISBN 9781786992789. OCLC 1038006618.
- The New Age of Empire: How Racism and Colonialism Still Rule the World. London: Allen Lane. 2021. ISBN 9780241437445.
- The Psychosis of Whiteness: Surviving the Insanity of a Racist World. Penguin Books. 2023. ISBN 9780141992396.
- Nobody Can Give You Freedom: The Political Life of Malcolm X. New York: Bold Type Books. 2025. ISBN 9781645030706.
