= Adolphus G. Belk Jr. =

American political scientist

Adolphus G. Belk, Jr. is an American political analyst and professor of political science and African American studies. He was born in New York to Mrs. Azalia Belk and Mr. Adolphus Belk, Sr. He currently teaches at Winthrop University with a focus on issues of race and politics. He also specializes in the "prison-industrial complex." He is a political commentator and has published in periodicals such as Time and Democrat. He was a guest editor for a special issue of the Journal of Race and Policy, in which he published twice.

== Career ==
He was a double major, receiving a B.A. in African American Studies and a B.A. in Political Science from Syracuse University. He graduated summa cum laude and Phi Beta Kappa. He received an M.A. and Ph.D. at the University of Maryland.

== Publications ==
=== Guest editor ===
- Journal of Race and Policy - 2008

=== Published works ===
- “Peanuts, Pigs, Trash and Prisons: The Politics of Punishment in the Old Dominion and Sussex County,”
- A New Generation of Native Sons: Men of Color and the Prison-Industrial Complex, The Joint Center for Political and Economic Studies Health Policy Institute - 2006
- Making It Plain : Deconstructing the Politics of the American Prison-Industrial Complex (thesis) - 2003

== TV appearances ==
- "Do South Carolina Primaries Foreshadow Shifting Political Priorities?" PBS, 2006, (himself)
