= Janis Mayes =

American professor of Africana studies

- Born: Janis Alene Mayes
- Education: Fisk University; University of Paris-Sorbonne
- Occupations: Author, literary critic, translator, and
- Known for: Professor of Africana literature

Dr. Janis Alene Mayes is an American author, literary critic and translator and a professor in Africana literature.

== Early life ==
Mayes gained her undergraduate degree in French literature at Fisk University. She was a Fulbright Scholar. She had additional study as a scholar at the University of Paris-Sorbonne. In the 1980s she moved to Syracuse, New York, where she began teaching at Syracuse University in the Department of African American Studies; she is currently a professor there. She teaches in the Department of African American Studies at Syracuse University.

== Career ==
Mayes contributed to French and English literature in the African diaspora. Her specialties are in French translation literary practices. She has translated anthologies and books in francophone literatures. Her translation of A Rain of Words is an anthology of francophone poetry. She is the director of a US study abroad program that examines the historical connections between African Americans and "Black Paris", entitled Paris Noir. The Syracuse University program claims to have shaped Africana-focused cultural programs at leading museums in Paris such as the Louvre. Nina Simone, Archie Shepp, Barbara Chase-Riboud, Sonia Sanchez and Toni Morrison were involved. She was a board member of the Toni Morrison Society. In 2004, she conversed with Morrison at the Theatre de la Madeleine after the unveiling of a bench commemorating the end of slavery in France. She has also organized cultural literary conferences, including an event with Discover Paris! that celebrated Morrison's literary contribution to the African diaspora.

== Published work ==
- Taking the Blues Back Home/Ramener le blues chez soi, Présence Africaine (translation)- 2010
- A Rain of Words: A Bilingual Anthology of Women's Poetry in Francophone Africa, Irène Assiba d'Almeida (translation) – 2009
- The Blind Kingdom, Véronique Tadjo (translation) – 2008
- Mapping Intersections: African Literature and Africa's Development (with Anne Adams) – 1998
- Mayes, Janis A. (1998). "Review of Of Dreams Deferred, Dead or Alive: African Perspectives on African-American Writers". The International Journal of African Historical Studies. 31 (3): 686–687. doi:10.2307/221515. JSTOR 221515. ProQuest 229616417.
- The City Where No One Dies, Dadié, Bernard (translation; Washington, DC: Three Continents) – 1986
- African Literature and Africa's Development (AWP) (with Anne Adams)

== Honors ==
Mayes is a Fulbright Scholar and became President of the African Literature Association in 2003.
