= Martin Luther King Jr. Library =

The Martin Luther King Jr. Library may refer to:

- Martin Luther King Jr. Branch of the Oakland Public Library in Oakland, California
- Martin Luther King Jr. Library of the Sacramento Public Library in Sacramento, California
- Dr. Martin Luther King Jr. Library in San Jose, California
- Martin Luther King Jr. Memorial Library in Washington, D.C.
- Dr. Martin Luther King Jr. Library of the Brevard County Libraries in Melbourne, Florida
- Martin Luther King Jr. Library of the Atlanta–Fulton Public Library System in Atlanta
- Martin Luther King Jr. Library of the Chicago Public Library in Chicago
- Martin Luther King Jr. Branch of the New Orleans Public Library in New Orleans
- Martin Luther King Jr. Library at Boston University in Boston
- Martin Luther King Jr. Memorial Library at Syracuse University in Syracuse, New York
- Martin Luther King Jr. Branch of the Cleveland Public Library in Cleveland, Ohio
- Martin Luther King Jr. Library and Learning Center of the Dallas Public Library in Dallas, Texas
- Dr. Martin Luther King Jr. Library of the Tacoma Public Library in Tacoma, Washington
- Martin Luther King Jr. Branch of the Columbus Metropolitan Library in Columbus, Ohio
- Martin Luther King Jr. Branch of the Milwaukee Public Library in Milwaukee, Wisconsin
