= Michael S. Harper =

American poet and professor (1938–2016)

- Born: March 18, 1938; Brooklyn, New York, U.S.
- Died: May 7, 2016 (aged 78); Providence, Rhode Island, U.S.
- Citizenship: U.S.
- Education: California State University, Los Angeles, Iowa Writer's Workshop
- Occupations: Poet, Professor
- Spouse: (divorced)
- Children: Roland, Patrice, and Rachel Harper
- Writing career
- Language: English
- Years active: 1968–2016
- Genres: modern poetry, jazz poetry
- Subjects: Jazz musicians
- Notable works: Dear John, Dear Coltrane
- Notable awards: The Frost Medal for lifetime achievement in poetry (2008), Robert Hayden Poetry Award (1990), Melville-Cane Award (1978), Black Academy of Arts and Letters Award (1972), Guggenheim Award (1976) and NEA Fellowships (1977).

Michael Steven Harper (March 18, 1938 – May 7, 2016) was an American poet and English professor at Brown University, who was the Poet Laureate of Rhode Island from 1988 to 1993. His poetry was influenced by jazz and history.

Among the influences which shaped his writing, he said that the most important lesson he learned from musicians was phrasing, the authenticity of phrasing, and the transcendence and spiritual mastery. He published ten books of poetry, two of which—Dear John, Dear Coltrane (1970) and Images of Kin (1977)—were nominated for the National Book Award. Many of his poems have been included as examples of African-American literature and jazz poetry in various anthologies.

== Early life and education ==
Harper was born in Brooklyn as the first of three children into a lower-middle-class black family. His maternal grandfather, Roland Johnson, was a well-respected Canadian physician and was the delivery doctor for Harper at their home. He was also the primary influence in his early decision to pursue pre-med at Los Angeles City College.

His father Walter (who went by his middle name, Warren) was the originator of "overnight" mail and worked as a post office supervisor. His mother Katherine Louise, née Johnson was a medical secretary. Of his parents Harper once remarked, "My parents did not have much money, but they had a great record collection." This would of course later influence his work, blending poetry with jazz.

His younger brother Jonathan Paul was born in 1941 and died in a motorcycle accident in 1977. His younger sister, Katherine Winifred, was born in 1943. They grew up in Bedford-Stuyvesant, a north-central portion of Brooklyn, until his family moved in 1951 to their homestead in Los Angeles, where he attended Dorsey High School. As a teenager, Harper was eager to get out of his father's house and into his own, marking his desire to work, create and learn on his own terms.

In 1955, he attended Los Angeles City College, initially enrolling in pre-med courses and later literature, graduating in 1959 with an associate of arts degree. At the Los Angeles State College of Applied Arts and Sciences (now California State University, Los Angeles, he earned a B.A. and an MA in English studies in 1961. While there he worked part-time in the post office and called this experience his "real education".

He joined the Iowa Writers' Workshop at the University of Iowa, where he largely resisted the movement of writing in syllabics, which he called "incredibly mechanical". During his time in Iowa City Harper said, "Most of the things I learned…had nothing to do with the Workshop" given the uprising of the Civil Rights Movement at that time. He earned an MFA in 1963.

== Career ==
He taught English at Contra Costa College in San Pablo, California and his poems appeared in small magazines. In 1968, he became poet in residence at Lewis & Clark College and taught at Reed College both in Portland, Oregon. Later that year, he entered a manuscript in the U.S. Poetry Prize Competition, submitted by Gwendolyn Brooks. Although he did not win, Brooks calls his work her “clear winner.” Harper said Brooks gave him his career. With Brooks behind him, his book was published by the University of Pittsburgh and reviewed in Time in 1970 with a cover essay by Ralph Ellison. In 1996 Brooks presented Harper with the George Kent Poetry Award for Honorable Amendments.

In 1970, he taught at California State College in Hayward, California. He joined the English faculty at Brown University, where he taught literature courses and poetry workshops to undergraduates. He was chair for some years of the Masters in Creative Writing program. One of his student research assistants was Denice Joan Deitch, a student in the graduate program and Academy of American Poets awardee, 1977 (now Rev. Jade D. Benson, Unitarian Universalist minister and poet/short story writer). He also taught Michael Gizzi, Bob Kessler, Julia Thacker, and others who went on to write, teach, or serve the arts in other ways. Students referred to him as "MSH", "the Chief", and "the Big Man". He remained there until retiring in December 2013 and was the longest serving professor of English and Literary Arts at that institution.

In 1993, Nathan A. Scott wrote in the Princeton Encyclopedia of Poetry and Poetics that "Harper has created a body of work which, though it has won much respect and admiration, deserves to be far more widely known than it is."

Shortly after his retirement from Brown, former student George Makari remarked that Harper "deeply entered our personal lives, challenged us to rethink who we thought we were, [and] asked us to leave behind childhood and enter a kind of creative crisis."

== Personal life ==
Harper was married and had a daughter, Rachel, who is also a writer, and two sons, Roland and Patrice. He later divorced. He lived in Providence, Rhode Island until his death on May 7, 2016. Harper had two children who died at birth, which inspired several of his early poems, including the famous "Nightmare Begins Responsibility."

== Work ==
Harper wrote about important and historically influential African-Americans, including Jackie Robinson and Richard Wright. In an interview he said that the most important thing he learned from musicians was phrasing, the authenticity of phrasing, and the transcendence and spiritual mastery.

Harper often wrote about his wife, Shirley (commonly referred to as "Shirl"), their children, and their ancestors, as well as friends and various black historical and cultural figures. On poetry, Harper stated: "A good poem is a true poem. Often it cannot be distilled into a slogan, or an easy thesis." This relates to much of his work, most notably "Blue Ruth: America" (1971) in which the nation is portrayed in a hospital bed. In a 2009 interview, he commented on the need for public rhetoric, noting that people had trouble with President Barack Obama because he spoke about consequential things when most were used to "sound bites".

As writer

- 1970: Dear John, Dear Coltrane, nominated for the National Book Award
- 1971: History Is Your Own Heartbeat, won the Black Academy of Arts & Letters Award for poetry
- 1972: Song: "I want a Witness"
- 1975: Nightmare Begins Responsibility
- 1977: Images of Kin, won the Melville-Cane Award from the Poetry Society of America; nominated for the National Book Award
  - 1973: Debridement (included in Images of Kin)
- 1985: Healing Song for the Inner Ear
- 1995: Honorable Amendments
- 2000: Songlines in Michaeltree: New and Collected Poems
- 2000: Poems (University of Illinois Press)
- 2001: Debridement: Song I Want a Witness & Debridement
- 2002: Selected Poems, ARC Publications

Poetry accompanied by jazz music:

- 2004: Double Take: Jazz - Poetry Conversations, Paul Austerlitz, bass clarinetist/composer, innova Records, made through the American Composers Forum's Recording Assistance Program, underwritten by the McKnight Foundation.
- I Do Believe in People: Remembrances of Walter Warren Harper (1915–2004)

As editor

- Chant of Saints: A Gathering of Literature, Art and Scholarship (1979, ed. with Robert B. Stepto)

== Accolades and awards ==
- 1972: National Academy of Arts and Letters Award. Black Academy of Arts and Letters Award for "History is your own Heartbeat".
- 1976: Receives Guggenheim Fellowship.
- 1977: Receives grant from the National Endowment of the Arts. Receives Massachusetts Council of the Arts Award.
- 1978: Images of Kin: New and Selected Poems nominated for the National Book Award. Receives Melville-Cane Award from the Poetry Society of America.
- 1987: Governor's Award from the Rhode Island Council for the Arts. Honorary Doctor of Letters at Trinity College.
- 1988: Named first Poet Laureate of the state of Rhode Island.
- 1990: Receives Robert Hayden Memorial Poetry Award. Honorary Doctor of Humane Letters at Coe College, Iowa.
- 1991: Honorary Doctorate of Letters at Notre Dame College in Manchester, NH.
- 1994: Honorary Doctor of Letters at Kenyon College. Delivers commencement address.
- 1996: George Kent Poetry Award for Honorable Amendments, presented by Gwendolyn Brooks.
- 1997: Pell Award for Excellence in the Arts, Rhode Island Council for the Arts.
- 2001: Honorary Doctorate of Letters, Rhode Island College
- 2005: Serves as a judge for the Pulitzer Prize for Poetry.
- 2008: Frost Medal for Lifetime Achievement by the Poetry Society of America.
