= Robert B. Stepto =

Robert B. Stepto is a literary theorist and professor of African American studies, English and American Studies at Yale University. He is best known for his 1979 book From Behind the Veil. He has also edited the anthology Harper American Literature since 1993.

Stepto graduated from the University of Chicago Laboratory Schools in 1962, then received his bachelor of arts at Trinity College in 1968 and a master's and Ph.D. from Stanford University in 1974. He taught English and American studies at Williams College before joining the faculty of Yale in 1974.

He is a relative of jazz musician Coleman Hawkins.

== Selected publications ==
- Afro-American Literature: The Reconstruction of Instruction (1978, ed. with Dexter Fisher)
- From Behind the Veil: A Study of Afro-American Literature (1979)
- Chant of Saints: A Gathering of Literature, Art and Scholarship (1979, ed. with Michael Harper)
- Blue as the Lake: A Personal Geography (1998)
