= Family Building Society =

British financial services institution

The Family Building Society
- Type: Building Society (Mutual)
- Industry: Banking and financial services
- Founded: 14 July 2014
- Headquarters: Epsom, England
- Key people: Mark Bogard, Chief Executive
- Products: Savings, mortgages, investments
- Total assets: £2.1bn (April 2019)
- Number of employees: 172 (April 2019)
- Parent: National Counties Building Society
- Website: familybuildingsociety.co.uk

The Family Building Society is a trading name of National Counties Building Society, based in Epsom, Surrey, in the UK. It is a member of the Building Societies Association.

The brand was created by the National Counties Building Society and opened on 14 July 2014. The society claims it was the first building society to launch in the United Kingdom since the Ecology Building Society was established in 1981, however in fact it is just an additional trading name of an existing building society. Members of the Family Building Society are members of National Counties Building Society, and vice versa.

In January 2019 the society published a report in conjunction with the London School of Economics, The Bank of Mum and Dad: How it really works, on the role of parents ('the bank of mum and dad') when helping family members buy property.

This followed on from a July 2018 report, A tax too far? Monitoring the impact of SDLT, commissioned from the London School of Economics on the effect of Stamp Duty Land Tax on house purchase.

== Organisation ==
The Chief Executive is Mark Bogard. The Society has one branch in Epsom, and transactions can be carried out by phone and internet.

== Products ==
The building society concentrates on providing products and services that are designed to enable members of a family to provide mutual assistance, while safeguarding their savings, in particular parents who want to help their children. The initial capitalisation was £113 million.

The core offer consists of savings and mortgages. In addition, financial advisers Charles Derby have been appointed to provide financial advice to customers. The equity release partner is Key Retirement Solutions.

The flagship product is a mortgage, called the 'Family Mortgage'. Because the purpose of the deposits is to be security for the mortgage, the protection afforded by the Financial Services Compensation Scheme does not apply. Family is the first UK building society to include a payment waiver product, offered in conjunction with CUNA Mutual Group, where the mortgage repayments are met for up to six months if the mortgagor lose their job through no fault of their own. To enable high loans to value mortgages to be provided, Family will offer mortgage insurance products from Genworth Financial.

== Reception ==
Susan Hannums, of SavingsChampion.co.uk, criticised the savings rates offered stating that better rates were available elsewhere. David Hollingworth, of London & Country mortgages, said that the mortgage rates being offered are not as good to other 75% LTV deals though he expects the deals to appeal to the target market. Which? advises that if someone can raise a deposit of at least 5%, then other providers may be able to offer better rates. However, where first-time buyers have relatives who are able and willing to invest sufficient funds, then this mortgage could be suitable.

A media campaign, to publicise the Society, was launched in August 2014. AML Group ran the campaign.
