= James E. Turner =

American Black studies scholar (1940–2022)

James E. Turner (1940 – August 6, 2022) was an American Africana studies scholar. He was the founding director of the Cornell Africana Studies and Research Center.

== Biography ==
Turner was born in 1940 in Brooklyn, in a family of eight children. His father was working class, and Turner attended the High School of Fashion Industries. He grew up in Manhattan. Before he entered college, he worked in the garment industry and as a social worker. From 1963 to 1966 he attended Central Michigan University, earning a sociology degree and also studying political economy.

The year of his graduation, Turner entered Northwestern University as a graduate student in the African Studies program. While a student there, he was involved in student-activism, and led the Black graduate student association. In that role he was involved in protests for the establishment of a Black Studies program, including a 1968 sit-in of the university bursar department. This advocacy raised his profile to the national level, and he traveled around the country. Turner received a master's degree from Northwestern.

Turner was appointed as the director of Cornell University's newly formed Africana Studies and Research Center (ASRC) in June 1969. Seven years later he earned a PhD from Union Graduate School. Turner remained director of the ASRC until 1986, and was again director from 1996 to 2001.

While Turner was leading the ASRC, the center was burnt down, by what Turner alleged was arson. At Cornell, Turner wrote papers about his view of how Black Studies should be approached, a concept he termed "Africana", which the Encyclopedia of African-American Politics defined as "an interdisciplinary Pan African approach to blackness focusing on the US, the Caribbean and Africa." He also studied Black nationalism and politics in the US and Africa.

Turner died on August 6, 2022.

== Personal life ==
Turner was married and had three kids.
