= National Counties Building Society =

Financial institution in the United Kingdom

- Type: Building Society (mutual)
- Industry: Banking and Financial services
- Founded: 3 March 1896
- Headquarters: Epsom, England
- Key people: Rodger Hughes (chairman); Mark Bogard (chief executive)
- Products: Savings, Mortgages, Investments, Loans, Insurance
- Revenue: ▲£56.9 million (2022)
- Operating income: ▲£32.3 million (2022)
- Net income: ▲£25.5 million (2022)
- Total assets: ▲£2,401.8 million (2022)
- Total equity: ▲£156.5 million (2022)
- Number of employees: ▲196 (2022); 183 (2021)
- Website: Official website

The National Counties Building Society is a building society in the UK, which has its head office in Epsom, Surrey. It is a member of the Building Societies Association. At December 2022, the Society had total assets of more than £2.4 billion.

It was founded as the Fourth Post Office Mutual Society in 1896. On 14 July 2014, the society founded the Family Building Society. This was the first building society to launch in the United Kingdom since the Ecology Building Society opened in 1981.
