= Renate Simson =

American author, feminist and African American literature critic

Renate "Rennie" Marie Simson (March 13, 1934 – February 19, 2017) was an American author and professor of African-American literature and writing. Her work has been influential in African American literature and identity studies. She wrote an essay on Black women's sexuality and identity, The Afro-American Female: The Historical Context of the Construction of Sexual Identity.

Her work posited that victimized black women often avoided intimacy altogether which affected their sexual identity causing them to become self-reliant.

She worked as the English department at SUNY Morrisville for several years. She published more than 30 articles and chapters and presented at over 50 conferences throughout in the United States and Austria. She pioneered a study abroad program focusing on the Austrian African Diaspora in Austria with the University of Graz. She was department chair of the Department of African American Studies at Syracuse University.

== Death ==
Simson died on February 19, 2017.

== Publications ==
=== Books ===
- Will the Real America Please Stand Up - 2008

=== Papers ===
- Afro-American Literature of the 19th Century: A Focus for the 80's - Paper presented at the Annual Meeting of the Northeast Regional Conference on English
- The Unsung Past: Afro-American Women Writers of 19th Century - Paper presented at the Annual Meeting of the National Council of Teachers of English (69th, San Francisco, CA, November 22–24, 1980)
- Politics and the race issue as presented in the works of Afro American women writers of the 19th century (Afro scholar working papers) - 1982
