= Syracuse 8 =

Boycott by nine African American football players at Syracuse University

The Syracuse Eight were 9 college football players who advocated for an end to discrimination against African American football players at Syracuse University and for other reforms to the program. They eventually boycotted a practice and then the 1969 season.

In 1969 a group of nine African American student-athletes boycotted Syracuse University's football program to demand change and promote racial equality. Popularized erroneously in 1970 by the media as the “Syracuse 8,” the nine students behind the boycott were Gregory Allen, Richard Bulls, Dana Harrell, John Godbolt, John Lobon, Clarence “Bucky” McGill, A. Alif Muhammad (then known as Al Newton), Duane Walker, and Ron Womack. The student athletes drafted a list of four demands, three of which were advocating for the betterment for all student athletes at the university, were access to the same academic tutoring as their white teammates; better medical care for all team members; starting assignments based on merit; and racially integrating the coaching staff, which had been all white since 1898.

== Timeline ==
The boycott began after Floyd Little (who at that point was with the Denver Broncos) made critical comments in an interview published in The Daily Orange. Floyd, intending to boost morale, commented that several players on the upcoming Syracuse team could be drafted if they were to come up with total efforts, something he said they had not been doing. He left after saying he thought the black players were bitter and that he had never known the coaches to mistreat anyone. This name-calling included several black athletes and led to a walkout by 10 black varsity players. Little never retracted his words. This incident set off a longer boycott that lasted for a year. Facing what they believed to be unfair treatment and discrimination, the group decided to boycott Spring practice, which would later turn into, the boycott of the 1970 football season when a list of demands was not met. Head coach Ben Schwartzwalder's authoritarian handling was criticized by Dr. Johnson, in-charge of the Afro-American Center at Syracuse.

=== List of demands and Boycott ===
The list of demands was written to enhance the experience of all student athletes at the university, not just the black ones. The first demand was for equal access to tutors and academic advisors. Black athletes were pushed to take basic reading, writing, and physical education classes, while their white teammates had access to every course within their major of study. Many black athletes did not have the classes they needed to graduate with the degree they attended the university for. This demand was based on their awareness of how their academic potential exceeded the university's expectations.

The second demand for better medical treatment was rooted in the fact that the team medical doctor, Dr. William E. Pelow, was a practicing gynecologist by training and was hesitant to touch black bodies. The team doctor's primary recommendation for every injury (regardless of how serious) was ice and rest.

Demand three boils down to fairness. Black players wanted an equitable and transparent system for determining when Black players traveled to away games and received playing time. There were “unwritten rules” about how many black athletes were going to play in each game. The thinking of coaching staffs at the time was to not let a team “go black.”. It was reported that Black players saw discrepancies in whether they would play or not. As one player described it, “One week you'd be the second-string fullback, and then it'd be time to travel to an away game, and all of a sudden, you'd be the third string defensive end, and left off the team bus. They wanted coaches to stop calling them "boy" and referring to their hair as "fuzz".

The fourth demand was to diversify the coaching staff. Since 1893, Syracuse did not have a coach of color in any sport sponsored by the university. Discriminatory behavior and racist language by their head coach, Ben Schwartzwalder, and his assistant coaches left Black players on the team feeling as if they did not belong. During practices, a limit was placed on the number of black players who could be on the field at the same time. They believed this behavior restricted their talents and decreased the team's likelihood of winning games. The players believed that many of these issues could be remedied by hiring a Black coach.

Jim Brown, Syracuse alum and now member of the Pro Football Hall Of Fame, was brought in to try to mediate between the Nine and the head coach. In a phone interview with the New York Times in 2006, Brown quoted the coach as saying, “Ben had no clue, he had no understanding of what they (the Nine) were doing. He told them they were football players; they weren't Black and all that other stuff, they were football players. He didn't budge.” A black assistant coach, Carlmon Jones, was freshly hired out of Florida A&M, but coach Schwartzwalder then called in his black players and told seven of them they were off the team. Others quit in protest saying that if the others couldn't play, then neither would they.

In response to the Syracuse 8 boycott, a counter-boycott was staged by 68 white players opposed to reinstatement of the Black players. They signed a petition in full support of coach Schwartzwalder.

When their list of demands was not taken seriously by head coach Ben Schwartzwalder, the nine players continued the boycott into the 1970 season.

== Legacy ==
After a 10-week study, the committee concluded in December that “racism in the Syracuse University Athletic Department is real and chronic, largely unintentional, and sustained and complicated unwittingly by many modes of behavior common in American athletics and longstanding at Syracuse University.”

In the 39-page report released on Dec. 9, 1970, said that the “Athletic Department showed an unwarranted insensitivity to attempts by black players to question (offensive) treatment,” and criticized the “long-standing authoritarian role of Head Coach Schwartzwalder”.

After the release of the report, there was hope that since their claims were confirmed, change was imminent. Unfortunately, the small victory was short lived when the head coach of the team still did not have any interest in the report or its findings. A silver lining that came from this announcement was that the nine players, that have been effectively removed from the team at this point, would be permitted to keep their scholarship for the remainder of their academic careers at Syracuse University.

Only one of the nine players to boycott during the 1970 season ever suited up and played for the Orange again.

During the 2006 football season, the "Syracuse 8" were invited back by Chancellor Nancy Cantor to receive the "Chancellor's Medal", the university's highest honor, and their Letterman jackets. The university also formally apologized to the nine and commended them for their courage and willingness to speak up when faced with injustice.

Dana Harrell and Gregory Allen recall the day as such:

"They had us in the tunnel, and they wanted us, when they called our names, for us to run out of the tunnel, like we did in our playing days," Dana says. "And we looked at them like they were crazy. We don't have two good knees between us. But the satisfaction was immeasurable."

"There were nothing but smiles and old men welling up in tears.” Gregory says. “I almost don't have the words to describe it. It was a cleansing, a lifting of this baggage that I had been carrying around for years to have someone finally acknowledge that we didn't do this, you know, to spite the university or to hurt the university. We were trying to make the university and this world just a better place."

== National Impact ==
America was on the heels of one of the most divisive times in its history. The American Civil Rights Movement which scholars cite as lasting from 1954 through 1969 (give or take). Pillars of the movement such as Rosa Parks, Dr. Martin Luther King Jr., and Malcolm X were all still fresh in the minds of Americans and certainly in the media for the time. Although the Civil Rights Act of 1964 was signed into law by President Lydon B. Johnson, many behaviors and society “norms” that had come to be common place in America during the “Jim Crow era” were hard to unlearn and adopt new, progressive policies by many states and cities. The Civil Rights Act was a major victory for the movement, but in many ways, its signing was just a symbolic one. Much work still needed to be done in reversing Jim Crow laws at the local and state level for its African American citizens to see real change. Even after this landmark Act, the resistance by "pro-Jim Crow" lawmakers, politicians, and some white Americans, particularly in the southern states, led to the further unwilling to adapt a changing America.

== Today's Impact ==
Athletic trainers at the Syracuse football program have undergone significant changes from the 1970s to the present day. In the 1970s, trainers primarily focused on injury treatment and rehabilitation, while today they play a more proactive role in injury prevention and management. With advances in technology and sports medicine, trainers now have access to a wide range of tools and techniques to help athletes stay healthy and perform at their best. With the lack of practice back in the 1960s, trainers now have standards they must adhere to. Certification for trainers in Syracuse require the successful completion of the BOC exam by the start of employment, a New York Athletic Training Certification at the start of employment, and successfully pass a background check. Since then, the program has had a number of different coaches, including Paul Pasqualoni, Greg Robinson, Doug Marrone, Scott Shafer, and Dino Babers. They added assistants like Carlmone Jones each year to accommodate the racial problems they had on staff. Other head coaches of color were also hired like, Willie E. Jeffries Ritcherson, and W.C. Gorden helped fight these problems. With all this change there was one thing that wasn't addressed, and that was the education the players were receiving. Since the 1970s, the Syracuse football program has placed a greater emphasis on academic success for student-athletes. This has led to the creation of academic support programs and resources, including academic advisors and study halls. In recent years, Syracuse has also implemented a comprehensive Life Skills Program to help student-athletes with personal development and career planning. Additionally, Syracuse has consistently been ranked highly in the Academic Progress Rate (APR) rankings, reflecting the program's commitment to academic excellence. Also, academics began to advocate for reform in college athletics, arguing for greater accountability, transparency, and a renewed emphasis on the educational mission of universities after the 1960s in all major college programs. We can also see that the activism of the era, including the civil rights movement and the anti-Vietnam War movement, had a profound impact on universities and academic institutions. These movements challenged traditional hierarchies and power structures within academia and encouraged the emergence of more diverse and inclusive academic communities. Additionally, the activism of that era paved the way for greater student participation in university governance and decision-making processes, which can be seen after Syracuse 8 took a stand.

== Further impacts ==
America is once again reckoning with forms of racism, dehumanization, discrimination. The murder of Breonna Taylor, George Floyd, and Jonathan Price along with the international pandemic due to COVID-19 in 2020 has brought social justice and health care disparities to the forefront of the national and international conversation. Athletes today such as LeBron James, Colin Kaepernick, and Megan Rapinoe, frequently use their platform to speak out against racism, sexism, and police brutality. In the book titled “The Heritage” by ESPN contributor and host, Howard Bryant, The Heritage refers to the plethora of athletes from the past that also used their heightened visibility, due to sports, to speak out against social injustice issues. "The Heritage" refers to the linage and the duty for athletes today, to not grow silent in their million dollar contracts and gated homes, but to continue to use the platform that they have, that so many athletes of color before them had to fight for, to continue meaningful work in the community, uplift Black citizens, and be role models for those who come after them.
