= National Council for Black Studies =

Organization that promotes black studies based in Atlanta, United States

National Council for Black Studies (NCBS) is an organization dedicated to the advancement of the field of Africana/African American/Black Studies. It is a not-for-profit organization established in 1975. The National Council for Black Studies was founded by Bertha Maxwell-Roddey, the founding director of the Black Studies/Afro-American and African Studies Program at the University of North Carolina at Charlotte.

== History ==
Within the context of the Civil Rights Movement, a growing recognition of the need for the study of African-American world experience spurred student movements on several campuses for inclusive educations. The Black Studies movement (1968–1969) and the Black University concept (late-1960s) helped create more African and African diaspora-centered courses on various campuses. In April 1968, a national conference for Black teachers took place.

Bertha Maxwell-Roddey spearheaded NCBS in 1975 as part of this larger movement for African American studies. However, before its inception, Maxwell-Roddey's pioneering work at UNC Charlotte included a Black Studies program that served as the inspiration and backdrop for the NCBS's structure, philosophy, and aims, in addition to the meetings and conferences that Maxwell-Roddey organized.

=== UNC Charlotte ===
Maxwell-Roddey realized the need for Black Studies education at UNC Charlotte and the Black Studies program at UNC Charlotte was integral to the creation of NCBS. Maxwell Roddey was the second black full-time professor at UNC Charlotte and also a co-founder of the Afro-American Cultural Center in North Carolina, now the Harvey B. Gantt Center for African-American Arts + Culture. She was also the national president of the Delta Sigma Theta sorority from 1992 to 1996.

The Black Studies program at UNC Charlotte was conceptualized to address the "academic, intellectual, social, and economic life of the Black student." This was realized through a series of phases, which were levels of academic courses through which students would complete; they are as follows:

- Phase I: Who Am I?
- Phase II: Why Am I Here?
- Phase III: Where Did I Come From?
- Phase IV: Where Do I Go From Here?

Each phase included community service projects and the higher levels or phases also included research projects while the lower levels or phases were intro-level or survey classes concerning African American history and other disciplines. The Black Studies committee envisioned the program to both benefit the community and work in tandem with the entire university through an interdisciplinary approach.

Several organizations were affiliated with UNC Charlotte's Black Studies program including: the Black Student Union, Black Gospel Choir, Basketball, Student Government, and various Black and historical Black sororities and fraternities.

=== Early History of NCBS ===
The initial philosophy of the Council was that "Education should engender both academic excellence and social responsibility." The NCBS desired to expand and strengthen academic units and community programs concerned with African American studies. It originally operated as an organization for Black Studies professionals with the aim of developing the field as a respected academic discipline.

== Mission & Philosophy ==
Members of NCBS are committed to the proliferation of the field of Africana Studies. Their work has promoted and retained K-12, community college, and university curricula inclusive to the experience and contributions of African diaspora peoples and other marginalized peoples. NCBS actively:

- Facilitates, through consultation and other services, the recruitment of Black Scholars for all levels of teaching and research in universities and colleges;
- Assists in the creation and implementation of multicultural education programs and materials for K-12 schools and higher education institutions;
- Promotes scholarly African-centered research on all aspects of the African World experience;
- Increases and improves informational resources on Pan-African life and culture to be made available to the general public;
- Provides professional advice to policymakers in education, government and community development;
- Maintains international linkages among Africana Studies scholars; and
- Works for the empowerment of African People.

== Current efforts ==
The California Bill ACR-71 Africana studies programs led to success with the efforts of former NCBS member and president Shirley Weber.

Current NCBS board member and department chair of the Africana Studies program at California State University at Long Beach, Maulana Karenga is the founder of the Pan-African holiday Kwanzaa.

NCBS also has a community grant available for members to apply for. The funding has helped new leaders and scholars bring African Studies to various communities.

NCBS is currently housed at the University of Delaware in Newark, DE. Its previous location was the University of Cincinnati, in Cincinnati, Ohio.
