= S. N. Sangmpam =

American political scientist (born 1953)

S. N. Sangmpam (born 1953) is a Congolese American professor, author, and political analyst. He taught comparative political economy, international relations, and African American politics in the Maxwell School of Citizenship and Public Affairs and in the Department of African American Studies at Syracuse University until his retirement in 2023.

== Education and career ==
He received his MA and PhD in political Science at the University of Chicago. Prior to this, he received a Master in International Affairs from Ohio University and a Master in Public and International Affairs from the University of Pittsburgh. He has also received his B.A. in Political Science and Public Administration from the National University of Zaire.

Sangmpam is also a contributor in the field of politics for the Huffington Post.

== Works ==
=== Books and articles ===
- Ethnicities and Tribes in Sub-Saharan Africa: Opening Old Wounds (2017)
- Comparing Apples and Mangoes: The Overpoliticized State in Developing Countries (2007)
- Pseudocapitalism and the Overpoliticized State: Reconciling Politics and Anthropology in Zaire (1994)
- "Why the African Union Should Be Dismantled and Buried with Gaddafi" (2015)
- "Why the African Union Should Be Disbanded" (2015 longer version)
- "Explaining the Political Crisis in South Sudan" (2014)
- "Politics Rules: The False Primacy of Institutions in Developing Countries" (2007)
- "Will Kabila be a Dictator?" (2006)
- "Sociology of Primitive Societies, Evolutionism, and Africa" (2002, 1995)
- "American Civilization, Name Change, and African American Politics" (1999)
- "Lumumba, Patrice" (1997)
- "Tshombe, Moise Kapenda" (1997)
- "The Overpoliticized State and Democratization: A Theoretical Model" (1996, 1992)
- "The Overpoliticized State and International Politics: Nicaragua, Haiti, Cambodia and Togo"(1995)
- "Social Theory and the Challenges of Africa's Future" (1995)
- "Neither Soft nor Dead: The African State is Alive and Well" (1993)
- "Shaba Wars" (1993)
- "Political Theory to the Rescue of Comparative Analysis: David Easton's Analysis of Political Structure" (1992)
- "The State-Society Relationship in Peripheral Countries: Critical Notes on the Dominant Paradigms" (1986)
- "Understanding the Crisis in Peripheral Countries: The Case of Zaire" (1986)

=== Other publications ===
- "Y a-t-il des intellectuels dans la Lutte pour le Changement Democratique au Congo" (2017)
- "Are there intellectuals in the Struggle for Democratic Change in the Congo?" (2017)
- "The Congo and Why Obama Should Repudiate Clinton Policies" (2013)
- "Le Congo, le Rwanda et pourquoi Obama devrait se defaire de la politique Clinton" (2012)
- "When Obama Became Black, But Not Lwo or African" (2008)
- "Kabila doit tenir bon: Voici pourquoi" (1997)
- "Zaire After Mobutu: Who Should Rule, and Why?" (1997)
