= Cynthia A. Young =

American associate professor

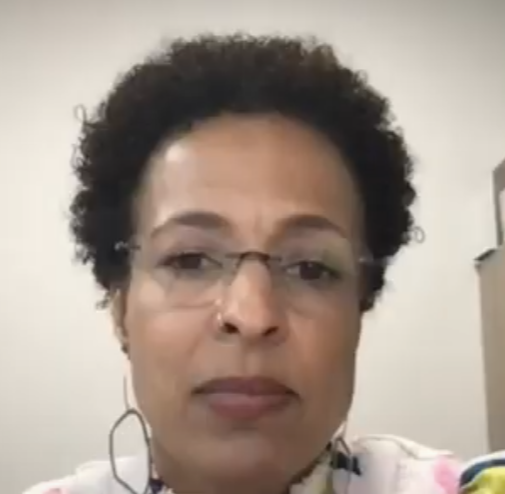
- Giving an online lecture in 2021
- Born: Cynthia Ann Young; 1969 (age 55–56)
- Education: Columbia University; Yale University
- Occupation: Academic
- Employers: Boston College; Pennsylvania State University

Cynthia Ann Young (born 1969) is associate professor of African American Studies and English, and head of the Department of African American Studies, at Pennsylvania State University. Prior to her work at Penn State she was on the faculty of Boston College, where she directed the African and African Diaspora Studies Program.

She authored Soul Power: Culture, Radicalism and the Making of a U.S. Third World Left (Duke University Press, 2006). She was a contributor to the exhibition Witness: Art and Civil Rights in the Sixties.

== Education ==
Young has a BA in English from Columbia University, where she was a Kluge scholar, and a PhD in American studies from Yale University.
