= Kwame Dixon =

Political scientist and human rights activist

Kwame Dixon (born c. 1960) is a political scientist and human rights activist who specializes on race in the Americas. His field of interest is in African descendant people living in Latin America, North America and South America. He is a professor of Afro-Latino Studies, Race, Democracy and Human Rights for Afro-Latin Americans. He currently works at Howard University as a professor in the department of African American Studies. He contributes articles to The Hemispheric Institute E-misférica, He is also a consultant for NGO's like Consultant – Club of Madrid Expert: African Women's Leadership Project.

== Career ==
He has a B.A, MA, and PhD in Political Science. He currently teaches at Howard University. He has been a visiting professor at Depauw University. He was a Fulbright Scholar. He has conducted field research on Afro American communities in Ecuador, Colombia, Brazil, Cuba, and Nicaragua. He has been a visiting professor in Spain for three years.

== Publications ==
=== Books ===
- Comparative Perspectives on Afro-Latin America (co-authored with John Burdick), University Press of Florida, 2012
- Racism and the Administration of Justice.
- "Transnational Social Movements and the Struggle for Human Rights: The Case of Afro-Colombians," (book chapter) in Rethinking Social Movements: Resistance, Power and Democracy in Post Neoliberal Era, edited by Harry Vanden and Richard Stahler-Sholk (Rowmann and Littlefield), 2008
- "The Intersection of Race, International Affairs and US Foreign Policy: How African Americans have influenced and constructed US foreign policy" (book chapter) in Colin Powell and Condoleezza Rice: Foreign Policy, Race, and the New American Century Clarence Lusane, 2006
- The Politics of Latin America: The Power Game, Harry Vanden and Gary Prevost (book chapter), New York: Oxford University Press, 2002

=== Journal publications ===
- "Afro-Cinema in Latin America: a new cultural renaissance," e-misférica – a Journal of Performance and Politics in the Americas, 2008
- "Where is Sara Gomez," SCOPE – A Journal of Critical Film Studies, October 2007
- "Afro-Colombians and the Struggle for Human Rights" Wadabagei, Journal of the Caribbean and its Diaspora, Special Issue on the Black presence in Latin, Volume 8, Number 1, Winter 2005
- "Discriminación Racial y Derechos Humanos: Los derechos de los No-Ciudadanos" (Racial Discrimination and Human Rights: The Rights of Non – Citizens): Revista Española de Estudios Norteamericanos, 2003

== TV appearances ==
Race and Revolution in Cuba Democracy Now!, 2000 himself
