= Milton Sernett =

American historian

Milton C. Sernett is an American historian, author, and professor at Syracuse University. He has published many books, articles and book chapters on African American history. His published works in African-American history focus on abolitionism, religion, biographies and the Underground Railroad. He has spent several years studying the anti-slavery movements in Upstate New York, particularly, the life of Harriet Tubman.

He is currently a professor emeritus in the Department of Religion, History Department and Department of African American Studies at Syracuse University.

== Early life ==
He is a graduate from Concordia Seminary in St. Louis, Missouri. He received his master's degree and Ph.D. in American history from the University of Delaware in 1972. He served as s research fellow at the WEB Du Bois Institute at Harvard University and a Fulbright Senior Scholar at the John F. Kennedy Institute for North American Studies, in Berlin

== Published works ==
=== Books ===
- Harriet Tubman: Myth, Memory, and History - 2007
- North Star Country: Upstate New York and the Crusade for African American Freedom, Syracuse University Press - 2002
- African American Religious History: A Documentary Witness, Duke University Press- 1999
- Bound for the Promised Land: African American Religion and the Great Migration, Duke University Press - 1997
- Abolition's Axe: Beriah Green, Oneida Institute, and the Black Freedom Struggle, Syracuse University Press - 1986
- Afro-American Religious History: A Documentary Witness, Duke University Press - 1985 (1985-86 Choice Outstanding Academic Book)
- Afro-American Religious History: Documents and Interpretations, Syracuse University - 1981.
- Black Religion And American Evangelism: White Protestants, Plantation Missions, and the Flowering of Negro Christianity, 1787-1865 - 1975

=== Other publications ===
- “African American Religion,” for The Oxford Companion to United States History
- “On Freedom’s Trail: Researching the Underground Railroad in New York State,” for Afro-Americans in New York Life and History

== Honors ==
- vice-chair - New York State Freedom Trail Commission - 2004
