= Afro-Americans in New York Life and History =

Afro-Americans in New York Life and History is an academic journal organized and distributed by Buffalo, New York's Afro-American Historical Association of the Niagara Frontier.

== History and background ==
Founded in 1977, the journal's mission statement informs readers that its purpose is "to publish analytical, historical, and descriptive articles dealing with the life and history of Afro-Americans in New York State." The Articles featured, deal with methodology and trends in local and regional African-American studies, historical and current. Additionally, documents are frequently published that have historical significance to the African-American in the state of New York, specifically. Finally, book reviews are published pertaining to aspects of the life, history, and culture of people of African descent and race relations.

At the time of the journal's first publication, the success of Alex Haley's novel Roots: The Saga of an American Family (1976) had created an immense, new found interest in the African-American community for the discovery, preservation, and presentation of the often-overlooked rich cultural heritage that African Americans had established in the United States.

== Relevance ==
The plight of African Americans in the United States in the 20th and 21st centuries can be connected to many different issues. The barriers of racism, economics and politics have greatly contributed to the oppression of people of color. These barriers continue to do so today. Whether purposefully or unknowingly actions in today's world due to these have left scars on society that have yet to heal. Afro-Americans in New York Life and History has played an important role in merging academic and community perspectives of African-American history and culture.

== Editors and Board of Directors ==
As of July 2013, Seneca Vaught, professor of history and African Studies at Kennesaw State University, is the journal's Editor, aided by Associate Editors Clarence Williams of CUNY, Lillian Williams of SUNY at Buffalo, and Oscar R. Williams of SUNY at Albany. A variety of scholars who are interested in furthering the field of African-American history serve as Contributing Editors.

In addition to Editorial supervision, the twenty-three-member board of directors that oversees the Afro-American Historical Association of the Niagara Frontier also has input into the operation and contents of the journal.

== Notable issues ==
The issues concerning this journal are aimed towards African Americans in New York, with prevalent issues brought to light and discussed in the volumes of Afro-Americans in New York Life and History. In 2005, the New York Historical Society held an exhibition titled Slavery in New York. An issue regarding Slavery in Albany, New York by Oscar Williams, Vol. 34, No. 2 (July 2010) emphasized that slavery was not limited to the south. In 1991, human remains by construction workers in lower Manhattan raised awareness of the African Burial Ground, where slaves in New York City were buried. Slavery was practiced into the 19th century. Most studies on slavery in New York have mentioned other New York cities sparingly. There is a failure on an understanding that slavery was widespread throughout New York. The capital, Albany, houses a special relationship of slavery beginning with the establishment of the Dutch West India Company in 1621.

Another issue arose in regards to African-American prisoners as passive citizens. Themis Chronopoulos' article "Political Power and Passive Citizenship: The Implications of Considering African American Prisoners as Residents of Rural New York State Districts" explains how African-American prisoners who used to live in New York City were transferred to a rural prison, which has had critical political implications. This movement of prisoners has allowed more conservative legislators to hold a political office. State law dictates that prisoners have no rights but are still being accounted for in the population. Consequently, these conservative legislators have been generally hostile in regards to African Americans and their interest. If it was not for the urban population of upstate New York, numerous senate districts would have to be redrawn due to a lack of number of residents. The Republican Party would not be able to dominate the New York State Senate and downstate New York would be more politically powerful.

== Scholarship ==
The Carter G. Woodson essay contest is a scholarship awarded to students, ranging from grades 4–12, that show significant ability in writing. These essays are themed and students must be a resident from the western New York area. Cash prizes and certificates are presented to the winner. The winners' essays will be published in Historically Speaking and read at the African American History Program.
