= Cornell Africana Studies and Research Center =

The Africana Studies and Research Center (ASRC) at Cornell University is an academic unit devoted to the study of the global migrations and reconstruction of African peoples, as well as patterns of linkages to the African continent (and among the peoples of the African Diaspora). The Africana Studies program offers around 23 graduate and undergraduate courses each semester. Africana offers an undergraduate major for students in the Cornell University College of Arts and Sciences as well as a Ph.D. through the Cornell University Graduate School. The John Henrik Clarke Africana Library, located at the Center, focuses on the social, economic, and political dimensions of the history and cultures of peoples of African descent. It has more than 17,000 volumes.

The ASRC occupies 310 Triphammer Rd in the Village of Cayuga Heights, New York. Its founding director is James Turner.

== History ==
In the late 1960s, the Black Community began to ask for academic programs and funding for ethnic studies, including the establishment of an Africana studies program. By the spring of 1969, the Administration had recruited James Turner as the program's first director. The ASRC offered its first classes in the fall of 1969 in its first building at 320 Wait Avenue, after the subsequent Willard Straight Hall Takeover. On April 1, 1970, 320 Wait Avenue was destroyed in a racially motivated arson attack. The ASRC was temporarily relocated to the unoccupied North Campus low-rise dormitory 8, and was permanently relocated to 310 Triphammer Road. However, a number of irreplaceable documents, including Turner's draft Ph.D. dissertation were lost in the blaze.

Subsequently, controversy arose because in ASRC's early years, its classes were not printed in the university's course and room roster making it difficult for white students to enroll. Instead, course offerings were distributed to COSEP students. As a result, from 1969 to 1972, no white students enrolled in ASRC classes. In addition to limited distribution of ASRC's course offering, many classes had an "experiential prerequisite" requiring that students have the "black experience" before they are eligible to enroll in the class. In addition, enrollment in certain classes required the approval of Turner, the Director of ASRC, who would routinely fail to meet with white students who made appointments to see him at his office. On the third anniversary of the ASRC, the Board of Trustees formed a committee headed by Lisle C. Carter, Jr. to evaluate the progress of the ASRC, and three white students successfully enrolled in an ASRC course on South African history. The Trustees decided to continue the ASRC.

In April 2010, ASRC hosted a scholarly conference in celebration of its 40th anniversary.

From its inception, the ASRC reported directly to the Provost independent of any undergraduate college. In 2005, the Report of Visiting Committee to the Africana Studies and Research Center which consisted of scholars from Northwestern, Yale and New York University found the ASRC reporting to the Provost to be a "peculiar arrangement," and recommended that Cornell "revisit this arrangement." On December 1, 2010, Cornell Provost Kent Fuchs announced that the Center would become a department in the Cornell University College of Arts and Sciences effective July 1, 2011. Fuchs said that the shift would facilitate the start of an Africana PhD program. In response, Robert L. Harris, Jr resigned as ASRC's director. Elizabeth Adkins-Regan and David Harris served as interim co-directors until July 2012. Gerard Aching subsequently served as director for the 2012-13 academic year before current interim director Salah Hassan filled in.

In Fall 2013, the Graduate Field of Africana Studies at Cornell University established the first Ph.D. program in Africana Studies in New York State and is expecting its first cohort Fall 2014.

== Notable past and present faculty ==
- Yosef Ben-Jochannan, adjunct professor, 1983 to 1997
