= Véronique Tadjo =

Pan-African writer and artist from Côte d'Ivoire (born 1955)

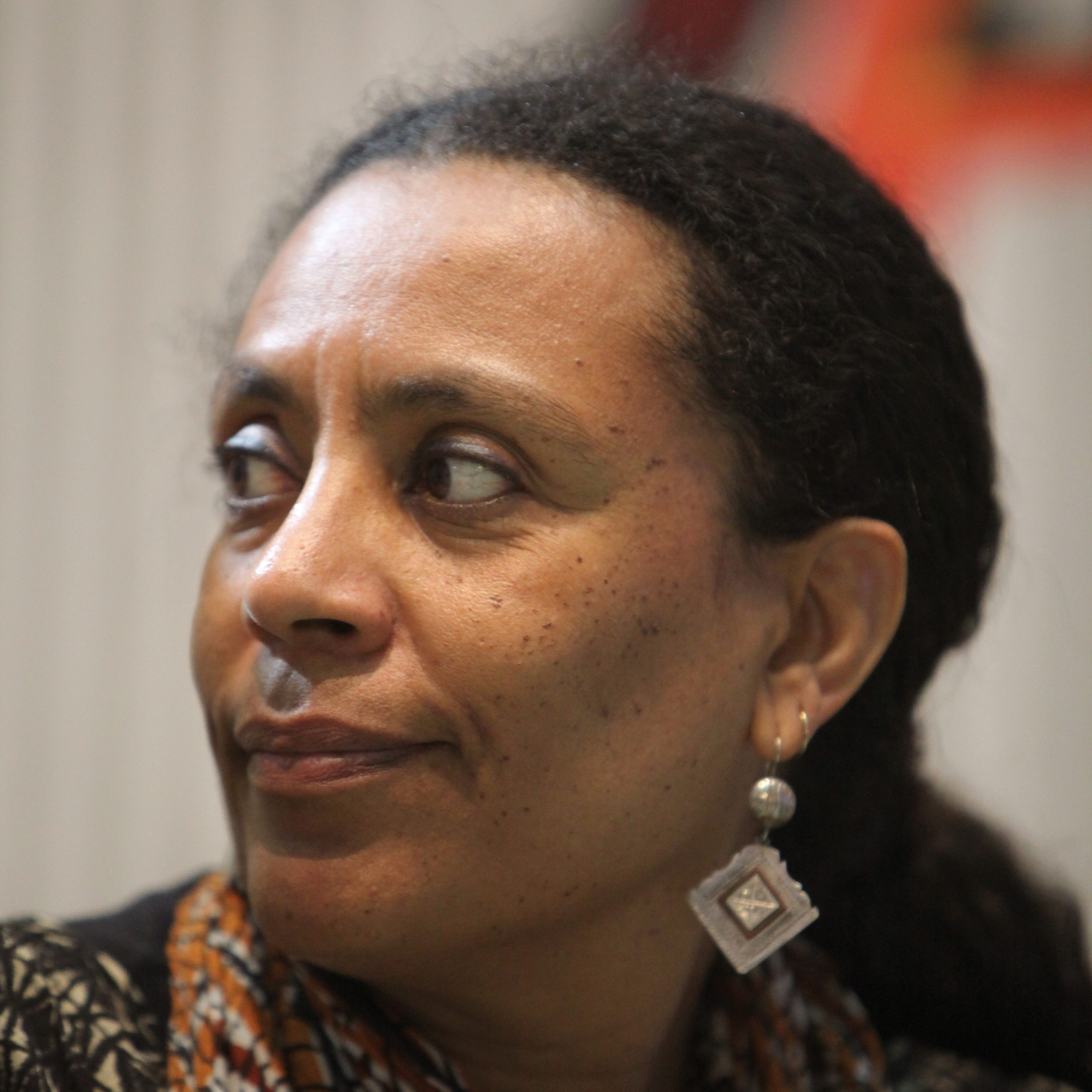
- Born: 1955 (age 70–71); Paris, France
- Education: University of Abidjan; Sorbonne; Howard University
- Occupations: Poet, novelist, artist, educator
- Notable work: Latérite (Red Earth); A vol d'oiseau (As the Crow Flies); Mamy Wata and the Monster
- Website: veroniquetadjo.com/en

Véronique Tadjo (born 1955) is a writer, poet, novelist, and artist from Côte d'Ivoire. Having lived and worked in many countries within the African continent and diaspora, she feels herself to be pan-African, in a way that is reflected in the subject matter, imagery and allusions of her work.

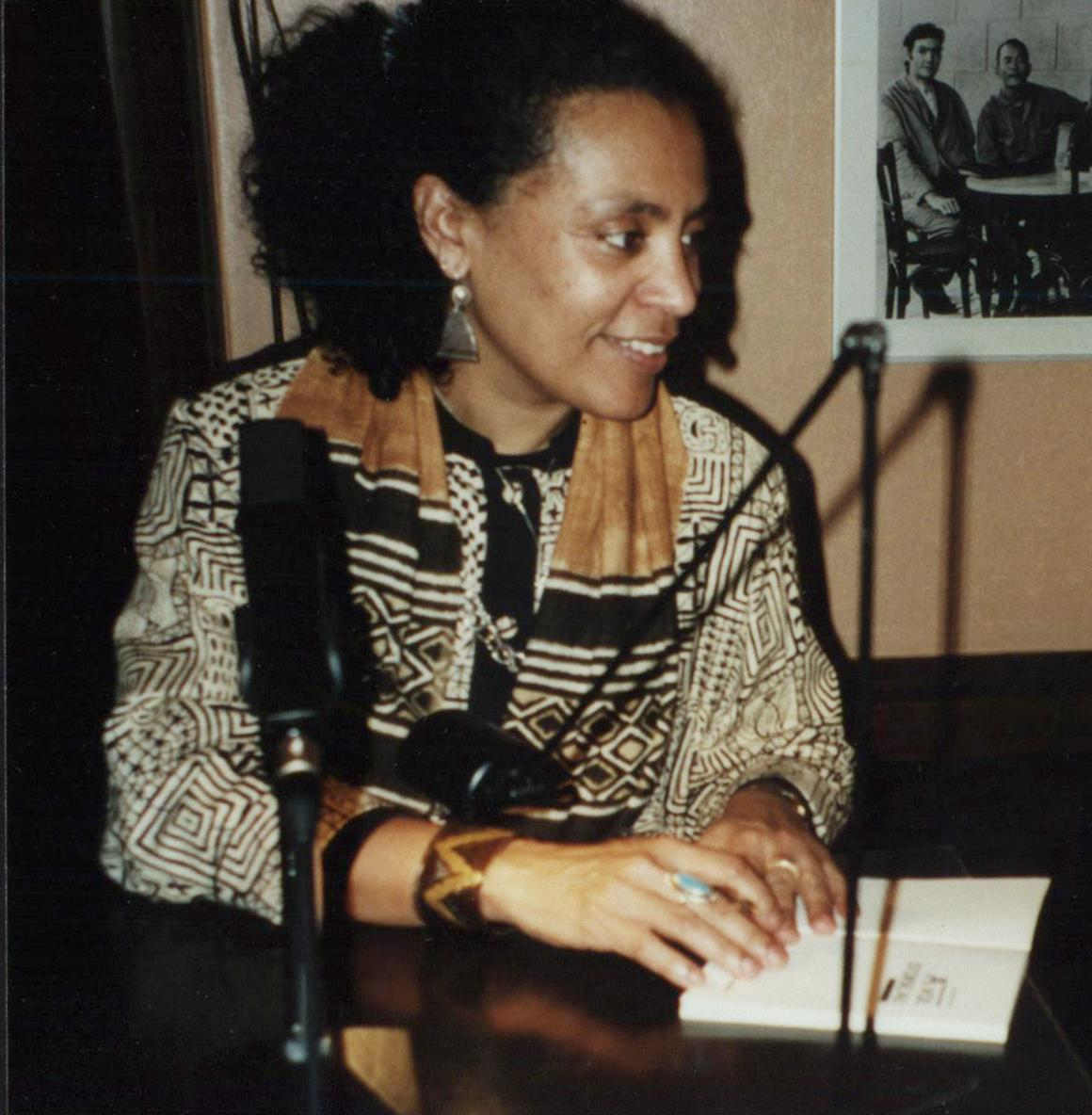
Tadjo during a public reading in Frankfurt/Main, 2001.

== Biography ==
=== Early years and education ===
Born in Paris, France, Véronique Tadjo is the daughter of an Ivorian civil servant and a French painter and sculptor. Brought up in Abidjan, Côte d'Ivoire, she travelled widely with her family.

Tadjo completed her BA degree at the University of Abidjan and her doctorate at the Sorbonne in African-American Literature and Civilization. In 1983, she went to Howard University in Washington, D.C., on a Fulbright research scholarship.

=== Career ===
In 1979, Tadjo chose to teach English at the Lycée Moderne de Korhogo (secondary school) in the North of Côte d'Ivoire. She subsequently became a lecturer in the English department at the University of Abidjan until 1993.

In 1984, she published her first book of poetry, Latérite / Red Earth, winning a literary prize from the Agence de Coopération Culturelle et Technique. Writing by Tadjo was included in the 1992 anthology Daughters of Africa, edited by Margaret Busby.

In 1998, she participated in the project "Rwanda: Ecrire par devoir de mémoire" (Rwanda: Writing for the sake of memory) with a group of African writers who travelled to Rwanda to testify to the Rwandan genocide and its aftermath. Her book L'Ombre d'Imana (2000) emerged from her time in Rwanda.

In the past few years, Tadjo has facilitated workshops in writing and illustrating children's books in Mali, Benin, Chad, Haiti, Mauritius, French Guiana, Burundi, Rwanda, the United States, and South Africa. In 2006, she participated in the fall residency of the International Writing Program at the University of Iowa.

Tadjo has lived in Paris, Lagos, Mexico City, Nairobi and London. She was based in Johannesburg after 2007 as head of French Studies at the University of the Witwatersrand.

== Awards and honours ==
Tadjo received the Literary Prize of L'Agence de Coopération Culturelle et Technique in 1983 and the UNICEF Prize in 1993 for Mamy Wata and the Monster, which was also chosen as one of Africa's 100 Best Books of the 20th Century, one of only four children's books selected.

In 2005, Tadjo won the Grand prix littéraire d'Afrique noire and in 2016 the Bernard Dadié national grand prize for literature. Her 2021 book In the Company of Men won the Los Angeles Times Book Prize for Fiction.

In a June 2024 graduation ceremony at the University of St Andrews, Tadjo was awarded an honorary Doctor of Letters (DLitt).

== Works ==
=== Poetry ===
- Latérite (Éditions Hatier "Monde noir Poche", 1984). Bi-lingual edition, Red Earth – Latérite; translated by Peter S. Thompson (Washington University Press, 2006)
- A vol d'oiseau (Éditions Harmattan; 1986); translated by Wangui wa Goro with the title As The Crow Flies (Heinemann African Writers Series, 2001)
- A mi-chemin (Éditions Harmattan, 2000)

=== Novels ===
- Le Royaume aveugle (Éditions Harmattan, 1991); translated by Janis Mayes as The Blind Kingdom (Ayebia Clarke Publishing, 2008)
- Champs de bataille et d'amour (Éditions Présence Africaine; Les Nouvelles Éditions Ivoiriennes, 1999)
- L'ombre d'Imana: Voyages jusqu'au bout du Rwanda, Actes Sud, 2000); translated by Veronique Wakerley as The Shadow of Imana: Travels in the Heart of Rwanda (Heinemann AWS, 2002)
- Reine Pokou (Actes Sud, 2005); translated by Amy Baram Reid as Queen Pokou (Ayebia Clarke Publishing, 2009)
- Loin de mon père (Actes Sud, 2010); translated by Amy Baram Reid as Far from My Father (University of Virginia Press/CARAF, 2014)
- In the Company of Men (Other Press, 2021, ISBN 978-1-63542-095-1); translated by John Cullen

=== Children's ===
- La Chanson de la vie (1990)
- Lord of the Dance: An African Retelling (Le Seigneur de la Danse; Nouvelles Editions Ivoiriennes, 1993; 1988)
- Grandma Nana (Grand-Mère Nanan; Nouvelles Editions Ivoiriennes, 1996; 2000)
- Masque, raconte-moi (Nouvelles Editions Ivoiriennes)
- Si j´étais roi, si j´étais reine (Nouvelles Editions Ivoiriennes); translated by the author as If I Were a King, If I Were a Queen (London: Milet Publishing, 2002)
- Mamy Wata et le Monstre (Mamy Wata and the Monster) (Nouvelles Editions Ivoiriennes, 1993; Prix UNICEF, 1993; bi-lingual edition London: Milet Publishing, 2000)
- Le Grain de Maïs Magique (Nouvelles Editions Ivoiriennes, 1996)
- Le Bel Oiseau et la Pluie (Nouvelles Editions Ivoiriennes, 1998)
- Nelson Mandela: "Non à L'Apartheid" (Actes Sud Junior, 2010)
- Ayanda, la petite fille qui ne voulait pas grandir (Actes Sud Junior, 2007; Nouvelles Editions Ivoiriennes/CEDA)
