= Afrology =

Scientific study of contemporary social structures of Africa

Afrology is a scientific study of the organization of the contemporary social structures of Africa. It places in the heart of African social change the notion of identity.

Afrology is a way of thinking about the various forms of social, institutional and personal identification. It posits that each individual, though determined by mental and psychological structures, reconstructs himself within the framework of specific or general broad collective identities, of which the modern State is an example.

This identity remains to be created in Africa. The problem arising in contemporary Africa is that of the reality of the State, federator of the institutions of socialization like the family, the village and the market, is for the most part unrealized. The collective identity, its delimitations, and its instrumentalization by politics consequently constitute the major axes of the comprehension of African society.

== Afrology Think Tank ==
The objective of Afrology Think Tank is to share a vision of the current socio-economic topicality with various actors, writers, economists, lawyers, data processing specialists, accountants and others. It also tries to collect information on the Internet and make some randomly selected texts available to readers. The goal of Afrology is to create a true space for reflection and debates on the African continent.

== Afrology and Africology ==
Following the Black studies movement and Africana studies movement, Molefi Kete Asante identifies the Africological movement as a subsequent academic movement. Asante authored the book, Afrocentricity, in 1980. Within the book, Asante used the term, "Afrology," as the name for the interdisciplinary field of Black studies and defined it as "the Afrocentric study of African phenomena." Later, Winston Van Horne changed Asante's use of the term "Afrology" to "Africology." Asante then went on to use his earlier definition for "Afrology" as the definition for his newly adopted term, "Africology." Systematic Africology, which is a research method in the field of Black studies that was developed by Asante, utilizes the theory of Afrocentricity to analyze and evaluate African phenomena.
