= Anti-Injunction Act =

US federal statute

The Anti-Injunction Act (28 U.S.C. § 2283), is a United States federal statute that restricts a federal court's authority to issue an injunction against ongoing state court proceedings, subject to three enumerated exceptions. It states:

"A court of the United States may not grant an injunction to stay proceedings in a state court except as expressly authorized by Act of Congress, or where necessary in aid of its jurisdiction, or to protect or effectuate its judgments."

The Act was originally enacted as part of the Judiciary Act of 1793. The current Act was enacted in 1948. As interpreted by the Supreme Court of the United States, the Act is a bastion of federalism and embodies the need to avoid "needless friction" between state and federal courts.

== History ==
=== 1793 enactment and 19th-century development ===
Section 5 of the Judiciary Act of 1793 provided that no "writ of injunction [shall] be granted to stay proceedings of any court of a state."

The provision has no legislative history. The traditional view, as advanced by the Supreme Court, is that the statute's prohibition promoted federalism by "unconditionally" prohibiting federal courts from interfering in state court proceedings. Some modern scholars have argued for a more limited reading: that the 1793 Act merely prevented a single Supreme Court justice riding circuit from enjoining state court proceedings. Nonetheless, the Supreme Court in the 19th century interpreted the statute to prohibit any federal court from enjoining state court proceedings.

In 1874, the Act was amended to formally prohibit injunctions by both the Supreme Court and lower federal courts. Congress later inserted the provision, unchanged, into the Judicial Code of 1911.

During the nineteenth and early twentieth centuries, the Supreme Court and lower federal courts read in numerous exceptions to the Anti-Injunction Act. Some exceptions were based on statutes: the Act was held to allow injunctions to protect cases in federal court pursuant to the federal removal and interpleader statutes, legislation limiting shipowners’ liability and granting federal jurisdiction over farm mortgages, as well as federal habeas cases.

The other exceptions came from the common law. For instance, a federal court could stay state court proceedings where the federal court had previously seized the piece of property (also called a res) that was the subject of the litigation, or where a litigant who lost a federal case sought to relitigate a precluded claim or issue in state court (also known as the Relitigation Exception).

Because of all these exceptions, a prominent law review article in 1932 declared that, by that year, the statute was “long . . . dead.”

=== Toucey v. New York Life Insurance Co. (1941) ===
The modern era of Anti-Injunction Act doctrine began in 1941, when the Supreme Court decided Toucey v. New York Life Insurance Co. The case began when New York Life prevailed in federal court on Toucey's claim to collect monthly disability insurance payments. Toucey then assigned his benefits to another individual, who sued New York Life in state court on functionally the same claim. On New York Life's request, the federal district court enjoined the state court proceeding. The Eighth Circuit upheld the injunction, reasoning that the Anti-Injunction Act did not apply because the injunction at issue was necessary to "effectuate and preserve" the "fruits of the decree" in the initial federal case.

The issue before the Supreme Court was the propriety of this application of the common-law Relitigation Exception. The Supreme Court, in a majority opinion by Justice Felix Frankfurter, held that the injunction was inappropriate because the Relitigation Exception "patently violates the expressed prohibition of Congress." The Court declared its intention going forward to only recognize exceptions to the AIA where Congress had expressly authorized them or where a federal court first acquires jurisdiction over a res and seeks to exclude duplicative state litigation over the same res.

=== 1948 Act ===
Congress partially overruled Toucey in 1948 by revising the Anti-Injunction Act to allow injunctions, like the one in Toucey, to protect earlier federal court judgments. It also codified the two exceptions the Court had already acknowledged. The 1948 Act's legislative history states its purpose as "restor[ing] the basic law as generally understood and interpreted prior to the Toucey decision."

The Act hasn't changed since 1948. It reads: "A court of the United States may not grant an injunction to stay proceedings in a state court except as expressly authorized by Act of Congress, or where necessary in aid of its jurisdiction, or to protect or effectuate its judgments."

== Current doctrine ==
=== Purposes ===
The modern Supreme Court has affirmed Toucey’s understanding that the Act is rooted in notions of comity and federalism. Per the Court, the Anti-Injunction Act's "core message" is "respect for state courts," and it was "designed to prevent conflict between federal and state courts." Accordingly, the Court has interpreted the three statutory exceptions narrowly and prohibits lower courts from creating new exceptions.

=== Key terms ===
- "Court": The AIA only limits the power of a “court of the United States” to enjoin state proceeding. A “court of the United States” includes the United States Supreme Court and the lower federal courts, including the District Court of Puerto Rico but not the District Courts for the Canal Zone, Guam, the Northern Mariana Islands, or the Virgin Islands.
- "Injunction": The AIA's prohibition on injunctions of state court proceedings extends to declaratory judgments with the same effect as an injunction. Whether a temporary restraining order or preliminary injunction counts as an injunction is a fact-specific question.
- "Proceeding": A “proceeding” for the purposes of the AIA include “[a]ll steps taken or which may be taken in the state court or by its officers from the institution to the close of the final process." The prohibition applies to appellate as well as to original proceedings. It does not include arbitration or other private dispute resolution mechanisms instituted by agreement between the parties, unless the arbitration involves a judicial inquiry (for instance, to decide and enforce rights and liabilities). The Act's prohibition also does not apply to state administrative proceedings.
- "Parties bound": The Anti-Injunction Act's text applies to all parties to a federal court proceeding, but the Supreme Court has recognized a number of exceptions. In Leiter Minerals, Inc. v. United States, the Court held that the federal government may enjoin state proceedings if necessary to prevent irreparable injury to the national interest. Similarly, the Act does not apply to federal agencies that effectively function as a national sovereign and that assert a superior federal interest.

=== Statutory exceptions ===
The Anti-Injunction Act contemplates three circumstances under which its bar on injunctions of state-court proceedings does not apply. Specifically, federal courts are not barred from enjoining proceedings (1) “as expressly authorized by Act of Congress,” (2) “when necessary in aid of” the federal court's jurisdiction, or (3) “to protect or effectuate federal court judgments.” These three exceptions are known as, respectively, the Expressly Authorized Exception, the Aid of Jurisdiction Exception, and the Relitigation Exception. The Supreme Court has stated that the three statutory exceptions are exclusive and “should not be enlarged by loose statutory construction.”

==== Expressly Authorized Exception ====
Under the Expressly Authorized Exception, federal courts can enjoin state court proceedings "as expressly authorized by Act of Congress." The theory behind the exception is that, by expressly allowing stays of state court proceedings pursuant to certain statutes, Congress validly overrides the limitation that it imposed in the Anti-Injunction Act. To fall within the exception, the Supreme Court has held, a statute "need not expressly refer to" the AIA, but it must "clearly create a federal right or remedy enforceable in a federal court [that] could be given its intended scope only by the stay of a state court proceeding."

The major Supreme Court cases interpreting the Expressly Authorized Exception are Mitchum v. Foster and Vendo Co. v. Lektro-Vend Corp.

- Mitchum v. Foster (1972): 42 U.S.C. § 1983 allows a person to sue in federal court for violations of federal constitutional rights. In Mitchum, the Supreme Court held that Section 1983 "expressly authorizes" federal injunctions of state proceedings because its purpose was to "interpose the federal courts between the States and the people" and to enforce the Fourteenth Amendment against state action, "whether that action be executive, legislative, or judicial." Thus, the federal district court in Mitchum could lawfully issue an injunction preventing a Florida state court from issuing a temporary restraining order that violated Mitchum's First and Fourteenth Amendment rights.
- Vendo Co. v. Lektro-Vend Corp. (1977): Section 16 of the Clayton Antitrust Act allows federal suits for injunctive relief against unlawfully anticompetitive behavior. In Vendo Co., the Supreme Court held that Section 16 was not an "expressly authorized" exception to the AIA. Then-Justice William Rehnquist's plurality opinion reasoned that a federal court's power to enjoin state court proceedings was not necessary to give the Clayton Act "its intended scope" because the Act's legislative history did not convey the same distrust of state judiciaries as did Section 1983's. Justice Harry Blackmun's concurring opinion argued that Section 16 should expressly authorize injunctions, but only where a pending state court proceeding is itself part of a "'pattern of baseless repetitive claims' that are being used as an anti-competitive device."

According to a leading treatise, "[l]ower courts have struggled to reconcile" these two decisions. Statutes held to fall within the exception include the Anti-Drug Abuse Act of 1988 and the Agricultural Credit Act. Statutes held to fall outside the exception include the Longshore and Harbor Workers' Compensation Act; the Federal Rules of Civil Procedure; the Equal Credit Opportunity Act; and the Americans with Disabilities Act.

==== Aid of Jurisdiction Exception ====
Under the Aid of Jurisdiction Exception, federal courts can enjoin state court proceedings if "necessary in aid of" the federal court's jurisdiction. The exception's legislative history indicates that its purpose was "to make clear the recognized power of the Federal courts to stay proceedings in State cases removed to the district courts." In other words, if a lawsuit begun in state court is removed to federal court, the federal court can enjoin the state court from continuing to exercise jurisdiction. The Aid of Jurisdiction Exception also applies "when the federal court first acquires jurisdiction in parallel in rem actions."

Despite the exception's seemingly permissive language, however, the Supreme Court has reiterated that it does not extend to in personam actions (i.e. cases not dealing with real property). In Atlantic Coast Line Railroad Co. v. Brotherhood of Locomotive Engineers, Justice Hugo Black's majority opinion held that the exception does not apply simply because there is duplicative litigation in state and federal courts, even if the federal court has exclusive subject matter jurisdiction.

==== Relitigation Exception ====
Under the Relitigation Exception, federal courts can enjoin state proceedings if necessary to "protect or effectuate" a previous federal judgment. According to the Supreme Court, this exception is "designed to implement 'well-recognized concepts' of claim and issue preclusion." The exception was included in the 1948 Act to expressly overrule Toucey v. New York Life Insurance Co. Its purpose, according to one treatise, is to "prevent the harassment of successful federal litigants through repetitious state litigation."

Litigation concerning the Relitigation Exception centers on whether the requirements of claim preclusion (also called res judicata) and issue preclusion (also called collateral estoppel) were met in a previously-decided federal action. For instance, the Supreme Court has held that the exception only applies to issues that a federal court has finally and fully decided. Likewise, the exception only applies when the state court itself has not yet ruled on the merits of a preclusion defense. Several commentators have suggested that this incentivizes defendants not to argue preclusion in state court, which may not be as receptive as a federal court to granting a motion to dismiss. Rather, one treatise counsels, "the person subjected to a repetitive suit in state court should immediately seek a federal court injunction."

== Related issues ==
=== Relationship to non-statutory abstention ===
The Anti-Injunction Act can be seen as one of several abstention doctrines invoked by federal courts to decline to decide certain matters that would intrude upon the powers of another court. For instance, under so-called Pullman abstention, a federal court will generally abstain from deciding a case presenting unresolved state-law and federal constitutional questions if a state court could clarify the state-law question to make the constitutional ruling unnecessary. Under Younger abstention, a federal court will generally abstain from interfering with ongoing state criminal proceedings. Other important abstention doctrines include Burford abstention (abstain where state court has particular expertise in a complex area of state law) and Thibodaux abstention (abstain to allow state court to decide matters of great local importance).

Like the Anti-Injunction Act, Pullman, Younger, Burford, and Thibodaux abstention are rooted in principles of federalism. Unlike the Anti-Injunction Act, they are not based in statute. For that reason, they have been prominently criticized as "judicial usurpation[s] of legislative authority in violation of separate of powers." This is because, as the Supreme Court has repeatedly recognized, "[i]n the main, federal courts are obliged to decide cases within the scope of federal jurisdiction."

=== Relationship to similarly named statutes ===
A number of other federal statutes are also referred to as "Anti-Injunction Acts." They are:

- The Tax Anti-Injunction Act, 28 U.S.C. § 1341, prevents federal district courts from "enjoin[ing], suspend[ing] or restrain[ing] the assessment, levy or collection of any tax under State law where a plain, speedy and efficient remedy may be had in the courts of such State."
- 26 U.S.C. § 7421, sometimes also called the Anti-Injunction Act, prevents federal courts from exercising jurisdiction over pre-enforcement suits to restrain "the assessment or collection of any tax." This statute is similar to the Tax Anti-Injunction Act but has been held to apply only to federal taxes.

== See also ==
- Abstention doctrine
- United States federal judiciary legislation
- Younger v. Harris
