= Colorado River Water Conservation District v. United States =

- Supreme Court of the United States

Argued January 14, 1976 Decided March 24, 1976
- Full case name: Colorado River Water Conservation District, et al. v. United States
- Citations: 424 U.S. 800 (more) 96 S. Ct. 1236; 47 L. Ed. 2d 483; 1976 U.S. LEXIS 22; 9 ERC (BNA) 1016

Case history
- Prior: On certiorari from the United States Court of Appeals for the Tenth Circuit

Holding
- Under exceptional circumstances, a federal district court may abstain out of deference to state court proceedings to avoid duplicative or piecemeal litigation.

Court membership
- Chief Justice Warren E. Burger Associate Justices William J. Brennan Jr. · Potter Stewart; Byron White · Thurgood Marshall; Harry Blackmun · Lewis F. Powell Jr. William Rehnquist · John P. Stevens

Case opinions
- Majority: Brennan, joined by Burger, White, Marshall, Powell, Rehnquist
- Dissent: Stewart, joined by Blackmun, Stevens
- Dissent: Stevens

Laws applied
- 28 U.S.C. § 1345, 43 U.S.C. § 666

Colorado River Water Conservation District v. United States, 424 U.S. 800 (1976), was a case in which the Supreme Court of the United States extensively refined the abstention doctrine to prevent duplicative litigation between state and federal courts.

== Background ==
In the Southwestern United States, water scarcity was (and remains) a critical problem. The McCarran Amendment, 43 U.S.C. § 666, was a statute enacted by United States Congress in 1952 allowing the United States to be joined as a defendant in certain suits concerning the adjudication or administration of rights to use of waters. In 1969, the state of Colorado enacted a law to attempt to reorganize the procedure for legal determination of water claims within the state.

The procedure that Colorado created divided the state into seven Water Divisions, each one encompassing one or more drainage basins for the largest rivers in the state. Each month, Water Referees in each division would rule on applications for water rights, or refer the case to a Water Judge, who would rule on referred or contested applications on a six-month schedule, applying the prior appropriation doctrine. A State Engineer, along with engineers for each division, were responsible for the administration and distribution of waters in each division.

== Facts and procedural history ==
The federal government reserves the water rights on federal lands such as Indian reservations and national parks and forests. The rights to such federal lands in the state of Colorado affect the rights of users in Colorado Water Division No.7. On November 14, 1972, the government filed suit in the United States District Court for the District of Colorado, asserting jurisdiction under both 28 U.S.C. § 1331 (the federal question jurisdiction statute) and 28 U.S.C. § 1345, which grants the United States district courts with original jurisdiction over all civil actions in which the United States is the plaintiff. The government sued for a declaratory judgment asserting its own reserved rights and those of several Native American tribes, against over 1,000 water users named as defendants. The government had previously filed similar suits in three other divisions.

Shortly after the suit over Division No.7 was commenced, one of the defendants in one of the other suits filed an application in state court to join the United States as a party in a state court proceeding, pursuant to the McCarran Amendment. Several defendants in the federal court suit then moved to dismiss, challenging the federal court's jurisdiction to continue to hear matters pertaining to water rights. The district court granted the defendant's motion on ground of abstention doctrine, but the United States Court of Appeals for the Tenth Circuit reversed, holding that abstention was inappropriate.

== Majority opinion ==
Justice Brennan wrote for the majority. He first determined that the McCarran Amendment did not create an express or implied exception to § 1331 or § 1345, and then turned to the issue of whether or not the district court should have dismissed the suit because of the concurrent proceedings in state court. The McCarran Amendment permitted adjudication of the Native American tribes' rights in state court, and Brennan held there was no strong policy argument to eliminate the state courts' jurisdiction in this area. Moreover, the circumstances necessitating abstention were not present here, largely because this case did not present complex issues of state law or policy to be resolved, as was the case in past abstention cases such as Railroad Commission v. Pullman Co. (1941), Burford v. Sun Oil Co. (1943), or Louisiana Power & Light Co. v. City of Thibodaux (1959). Nor was this an attempt to enjoin state criminal proceedings, as in Younger v. Harris (1971).

However, Brennan also ruled that even though the case did not fall into any of the previously recognized categories of abstention, certain principles of judicial administration militated in favor of upholding the district court's decision to dismiss the case. Even though dismissal of a federal suit to avoid duplicative litigation was something of an exceptional nature, Brennan determined that it was permissible in some circumstances. He compared this case to an in rem action over the disposition of property, wherein a court first assuming jurisdiction may exercise jurisdiction to the exclusion of other courts. He listed factors federal courts may consider in determining the appropriateness of dismissal where concurrent jurisdiction exists:

- Inconvenience of the federal forum
- The desirability of avoiding piecemeal litigation
- The order in which jurisdiction was obtained by the concurrent forums

Brennan concluded by explaining that the whole policy advanced by the McCarran Amendment was to avoid "piecemeal adjudication of water rights," which would lead to concurrent litigation with inconsistent outcomes. Congress was well aware of pre-existing state procedures to determine water rights when it passed the McCarran Amendment. Furthermore, the federal government was already involved in pending state lawsuits in three other Water Divisions (4, 5, and 6), there was a 300-mile distance between the federal courthouse in Denver and the state courthouse in Division 7 (which potentially created transportation difficulties for the over 1,000 defendants named in the federal suit), and there had been very few proceedings in the federal suit prior to the district court's dismissal. Brennan held that when all these factors were taken into account, the district court ruled correctly in dismissing the suit.

== Dissenting opinions ==
=== Justice Stewart's dissent ===
Justice Stewart agreed with the majority that the McCarran Amendment did not diminish the federal courts' jurisdiction, and that the conventional doctrines of abstention were not implicated here. He disputed the majority's comparison of this suit to an in rem action, because a rule creating exclusive jurisdiction for the first court to take control of the property only applies when exclusive control of the property in question is required. In the litigation of water rights, where actual administration or control of a river was not being determined, this rule was clearly unnecessary.

Additionally, Stewart reasoned that dismissal of the federal suit was unnecessary because the rights the federal government sought to uphold were different from those being litigated in the state courts. Specifically, the federal suit was about rights the federal government had previously reserved, rather than rights based on the prior appropriation doctrine. Finally, Stewart gave two more reasons not to dismiss the federal suit: issues of federal law were involved, as were the rights of Native American tribes (who were typically free of state jurisdiction).

=== Justice Stevens' dissent ===
Justice Stevens also added a brief dissenting opinion. He felt that the majority was unfairly shrinking the scope of federal jurisdiction, and that it was anomalous to forbid the federal government the right to a federal forum. He urged the affirmation of the opinion of the Tenth Circuit.

== See also ==
- List of United States Supreme Court cases, volume 424
- Abstention doctrine
- Moses H. Cone Memorial Hospital v. Mercury Construction Corp., 460 U.S. 1 (1983)
