= Winters v. United States =

- Supreme Court of the United States

Argued October 24, 1907 Decided January 6, 1908
- Full case name: Henry Winters, John W. Acker, Chris Cruse, Agnes Downs, et al., Appts. v. United States
- Citations: 207 U.S. 564 (more) 28 S. Ct. 207; 52 L. Ed. 340; 1908 U.S. LEXIS 1415

Holding
- The decree enjoining the companies from utilizing river waters intended for a Reservation was affirmed.

Court membership
- Chief Justice Melville Fuller Associate Justices John M. Harlan · David J. Brewer; Edward D. White · Rufus W. Peckham; Joseph McKenna · Oliver W. Holmes Jr. William R. Day · William H. Moody

Case opinions
- Majority: McKenna, joined by Fuller, Harlan, White, Peckham, Holmes, Day, Moody
- Dissent: Brewer

Winters v. United States, 207 U.S. 564 (1908), was a United States Supreme Court case clarifying water rights of American Indian reservations. This doctrine was meant to clearly define the water rights of indigenous people in cases where the rights were not clear. The case was first argued on October 24, 1907, and a decision was reached January 6, 1908. This case set the standards for the United States government to acknowledge the vitality of indigenous water rights, and how rights to the water relate to the continuing survival and self-sufficiency of indigenous people.

== Background ==
=== Water rights ===
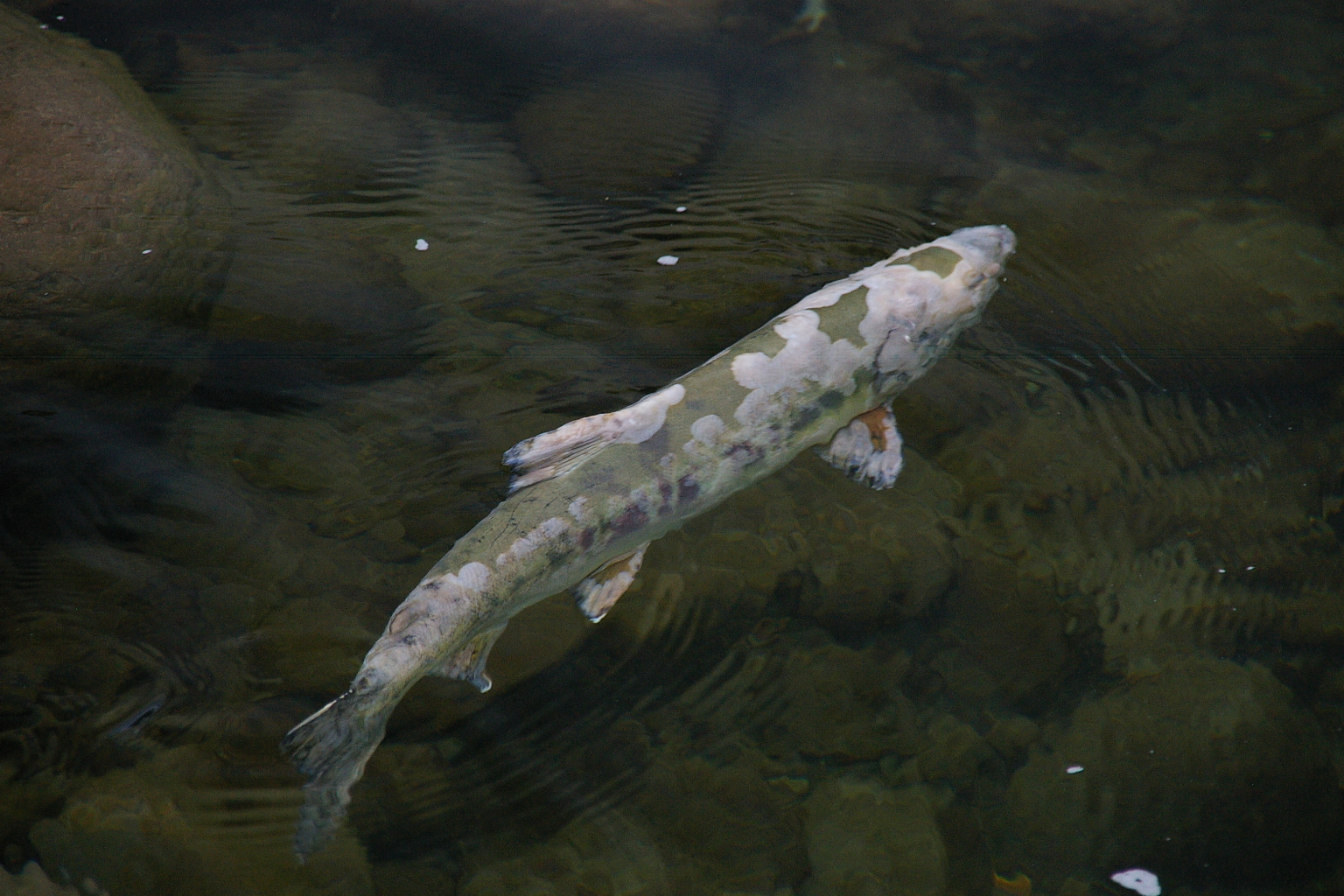
Water rights for indigenous peoples go much further than the water itself, as the rights also control where they are allowed to fish.

Water rights are extremely important to Indigenous peoples, especially those tribes living in the West, where water supplies are limited. Reservations, and those who live within them, rely on water sources for the water necessary for them to be self-sufficient. Reservations rely on streams and rivers for agricultural purposes. Not only is the water itself important to the Reservations, but also what the water contains. By having the rights to an area of water, one also gains rights to what is in the water. This gives an implied right to fish the waters. Because life relies on water, it may be fair to say that whoever controls the water ultimately has control over life on the reservation.

==== Riparian system ====
The Riparian water system is the system controlling water use in the eastern states where water is found to be more plentiful. Under this system the owner of the land bordering the source of water is entitled to use of said water. This system is sufficient for the states where water is found in abundance, but in the less water-rich western states the control of water must be handled differently.

==== Appropriative system ====
In the western part of the country, water ownership is controlled by the appropriative system. This system states that the owner of a piece of land does not automatically own the rights to water found on that land. Rights to water belong to the first user who puts the water to beneficial use. The first people to become appropriators of the water source have the right to continue using the water in the same quantity as always as long as they continue putting the water to good use. This holds true no matter how many other people wish to use the water. The latest water appropriator loses all of their water rights before any water rights are taken from the next latest appropriator. The Fort Belknap Reservation in Montana, which had been created by the government in 1888, experienced issues with the appropriative water system when water flow to their reservation was being diverted to settlements of non American Indians.

==== Fort Belknap American Indian Reservation ====
The Fort Belknap Indian Reservation was created in 1888 in Montana. It was created from what had once been a much larger area of land to be set aside for tribes. The 1888 agreement neglected to mention any water rights that were reserved for the reservation in relation to the Milk River. Soon there came a huge demand for water by settlers which was an issue for the Fort Belknap American Indian reservation. As non-Indian settlers began moving closer to the Fort Belknap Reservation, the settlers claimed rights to the water. The settlers did things such as building dams and reservoirs which prevented the reservation from receiving water needed for agricultural purposes. The settlers used the terms of the appropriative water system to support their actions, claiming that they had appropriated the water before the Natives living on the reservation had put the water to beneficial use.

== Decision ==
The United States Supreme Court case of Winters v. United States held that the decree enjoining the companies from utilizing river waters intended for a Reservation was affirmed. It was also held that when reservations were created by the United States government, they were created with the intention of allowing indigenous settlements to become self-reliant and self-sufficient. As reservations require water to become self-sufficient in areas such as agriculture, it was found that water rights were reserved for tribes as an implication of the treaties that created the reservations.

=== Majority opinion ===
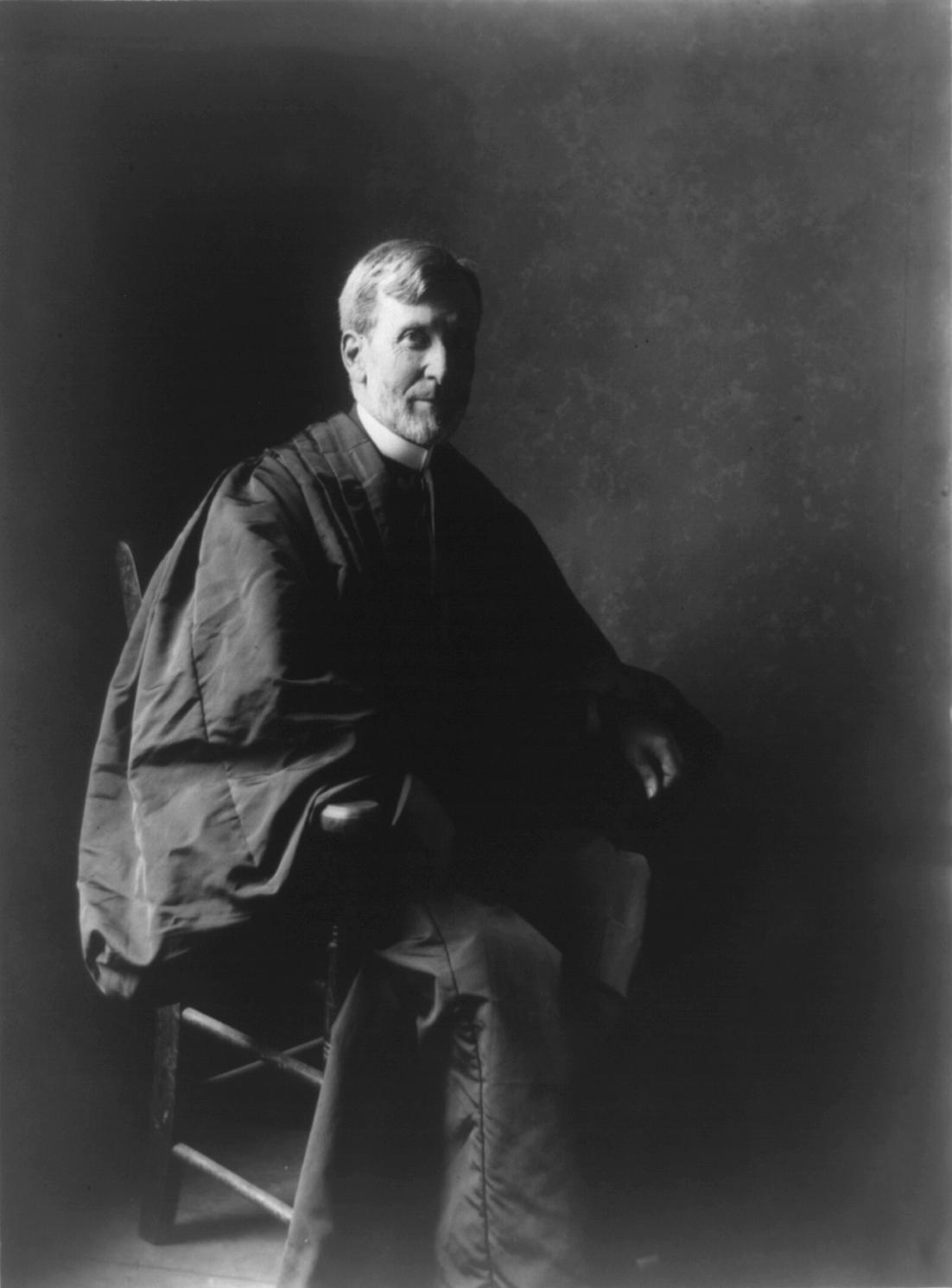
Associate Justice Joseph McKenna delivered the majority opinion.

The Supreme Court came to the decision that the Fort Belknap reservation had reserved water rights through the 1888 agreement which created the Fort Belknap American Reservation. It was found unnecessary for the natives to have to reserve the water rights if they had already reserved the rights to the land for agricultural purposes because the natives would have no use for the farmland if they could not have access to a water source. It was decided that the water rights of the Milk River were implied when the Fort Belknap Reservation was created in order to uphold provisions that had been previously stated. The majority opinion was delivered to the United States Supreme Court by associate justice, Joseph McKenna. McKenna wrote that five of the defendants named in the bill failed to answer. He wrote that the other defendants who did answer filed a joint and several answer. From this answer, the case was heard and a decree was entered against all of the defendants. It was determined by the Supreme Court that the reasoning behind the establishment of reservations was to provide a permanent homeland for the natives. The majority opinion found that the decree held. The majority opinion was held by Chief Justice Melville W. Fuller and Associate Justices William R. Day, Oliver Wendell Holmes Jr., John M. Harlan, William H. Moody, Rufus Wheeler Peckham, and Edward D. White. After the verdict had been reached, the United States government allocated $25,000 to be used for the purpose of extending the irrigation system on the Milk River for use by the Fort Belknap American reservation.

=== Dissenting opinion ===
Associate justice David J. Brewer dissented from the majority opinion.

== Implications ==
The Winters court reasoned that water rights were implied in the agreement that had been made with the natives in 1888, when the reservation was created. This agreement stated that the Fort Belknap Reservation had been created with the intention of the tribal people being able to become self-sufficient. The court noted that land without water has no value, especially when the purpose of a land was to help a group become self-supporting in the way of agriculture. Therefore, a reservation of water goes along with the reservation of the land. Water rights may be implied from reservations made by presidential executive order, or reservations which are created by an act of Congress. Other implications of this court case include setting more of a standard for indigenous water rights along with setting a precedent for later Supreme Court cases which deal with implied water rights.

=== Winters rights ===
Winters rights refers to the reserved water rights cases that followed Winters.

- First, that they are defined by the federal government and federal law controls them.
- Second, when reservations were established by either a treaty, statute, or executive order, and water rights were not specifically mentioned, a reservation of water rights was implied. These water rights apply to water sources that are either within the reservation or bordering it.
- Third, then states that the water rights are reserved as soon as the portion of the reservation cases where competing users of the water source have prior appropriation dates of said water source, they will take precedence over the indigenous rights. Only those with prior appropriation dates take precedence, those with later dates are subordinate to the reservation in question. In most cases, it is found that tribes do in general have senior priority dates for quantities of surface water than competing settlements.

The amount of water reserved for the use of tribes is equal to the amount of water that would sufficiently irrigate all of the irrigable acreage within the reservation. In some cases this part of the Winters rights is extended to include water used not just for agricultural purposes, but for all purposes. For example, a Bureau of Indian Affairs document breaks down what the BIA believes to be the estimated water requirements of all different reservations, including the Fort Belknap Reservation in Montana. This document states that the Fort Belknap reservation will need water for uses such as recreation, wildlife, forestry, energy, minerals, industrial use, domestic use, and agricultural use. These uses are listed in ascending order of the amount of water estimated to be required.

It is also said that Winters rights are not lost by an reservation's lack of use of the water; the rights apply even if the reservation is not using their full portion of water.

=== Effects following ruling ===
Although the ruling of Winters v. United States was made very clear, accounts show that water rights relating to reservations were put aside and neglected for decades after the ruling. While the United States government was caught up in the emergence of non-native settlers moving west, the government seemed to turn a blind eye to many non-native settlers who were making use of water sources which, under the terms of Winters v. United States, had been reserved for reservation use. The United States Supreme Court was not called upon to further define reserved water rights until the case of Arizona v. California in 1963.

=== Related cases ===
Winters v. United States was a United States Supreme Court Case with many implications. One thing that makes this case so monumental is the precedent that is set by it for Supreme Court cases that would follow it.

==== Arizona v. California ====
Arizona v. California was a set of 11 United States Supreme Court cases dealing with water rights. These cases took place between the years of 1931 and 2006. The initial question of this case was to determine how much water from the Colorado river Arizona was entitled to. Many western states became involved in the debate over the rights of the water from the Colorado River, and finally the federal government became involved stating that several federal establishments, including five reservations, had water rights as defined by Winters v. United States. This case helped to solve a problem found in Winters v. United States.; while the court in Winters v. United States held that Reservations do have reserved water rights equal to the amount of water needed on the reservation to sufficiently irrigate all of the irrigable reservation acreage, there was always the question of how to decide what amount of water was needed to sufficiently irrigate on the reservations. Arizona v. California offers the solution of adjudication to help fix this problem.

==== Arizona v. San Carlos Apache Tribe of Arizona ====
This case dealt with either the United States as trustee or certain tribes asserting their rights to have certain water rights in Arizona or Montana determined in federal court. The court ruled that all limits that any federal legislation put on state-court jurisdiction over indigenous water rights were removed by the McCarran Amendment. This piece of legislation allowed state courts jurisdiction to determine indigenous water rights. This ruling included suits brought by tribes and pertaining to only indigenous claims. The decision of this case was that the judgment in each of the cases was reversed, and the cases were to be reviewed further.

==== Nevada v. United States ====
This case centered around water rights involving the Truckee River. The defendants in the case were all people who used water from the Truckee River, while the plaintiff was the United States. The defendants argued against tribal use of the water in the Truckee River stating that the American tribes were not parties to the original cause of action between the United States and the non-indigenous users of the water. The court ruled that the tribes did have water rights and were allowed to make use of the water in the Truckee River.

==== United States v. New Mexico ====
The United States claimed to have reserved the use of water out of the Rio Mimbres stream only where necessary to preserve the environment and wildlife. For instance, to care for the timber in the forest or to secure favorable water flows. The Supreme Court upheld the ruling made earlier by the Supreme Court of New Mexico. This ruling stated that the United States did not have reserved rights in the Rio Mimbres stream when it came to recreational purposes.

==== Cappaert v. United States ====
Devils Hole cavern in Nevada became a detached part of Death Valley National Monument in 1952, by a proclamation of President Harry S. Truman made under the Antiquities Act. The cavern is home to a rare species of desert fish, the Devils Hole pupfish (Cyprinodon diabolis). In 1968 the Cappaerts, who were ranchers, were granted an application by the Nevada state engineer to begin using a water supply which took water from Devil's Hole cavern, which lowered water levels in the cavern and endangered the viability of the fish. The federal government sought to place limits on the Cappaerts' use of the water, so as to protect the fish from extinction.

The U.S. Supreme Court ruled in favor of the United States. The Court held that the implied-reservation-of-water-rights doctrine applies to groundwater as well as surface water. The Court next reaffirmed that "Federal water rights are not dependent upon state law or state procedures and they need not be adjudicated only in state courts." Finally, the Court held that when the United States had reserved Devil's Hole in 1952, "it acquired by reservation water rights in unappropriated appurtenant water sufficient to maintain the level of the pool to preserve its scientific value" (i.e., preserve the fish, which are "objects of historic or scientific interest" under the American Antiquities Preservation Act).

==== Colorado River Water Conservation Dist. v. United States ====
The United States Supreme Court case Colorado River Water Conservation District v. United States concerned the abstention doctrine which helped to prevent duplicate litigation between state courts and federal courts.

==== United States v. Powers ====
This case occurred over the argument of tribal water rights, and whether or not the water rights are passed along with the tribal land. When reservations would sell allotments of land to non-tribe members, those to whom the land was sold would want the same proportion of the reservation's water that the previous indigenous land owner had received. The Supreme Court upheld the earlier ruling that water rights are passed along with the land, meaning that a person who purchases land from an reservation also purchases an allotment of the water source used on the reservation.
