= Doctrines of civil procedure =

Civil procedure doctrines are rules developed by case law as opposed to being set down in codes or legislation, which, together with court rules and codes, define the steps that a person involved in a civil lawsuit can (or can not) take.

== Purpose ==
In the United States federal jurisdiction, these doctrines have developed to comprehensively deal with certain common issues that arise when a person is involved in bringing, or contemplating bringing a civil lawsuit.

== Other jurisdictions ==
Similar doctrines exist In other jurisdictions, (however they are sometimes referred to under names other than 'Doctrines of Civil Procedure'), although often they have much less importance.

For example, in England and Wales, all civil procedure is covered by the Civil Procedure Rules 1998, which according to Part 1 of those rules are a 'new procedural code', and have therefore largely replaced any pre-existing doctrines.

== See also ==
- Civil procedure
