= Bill Cole (musician) =

College educator, composer, free jazz musician, multi-instrumentalist

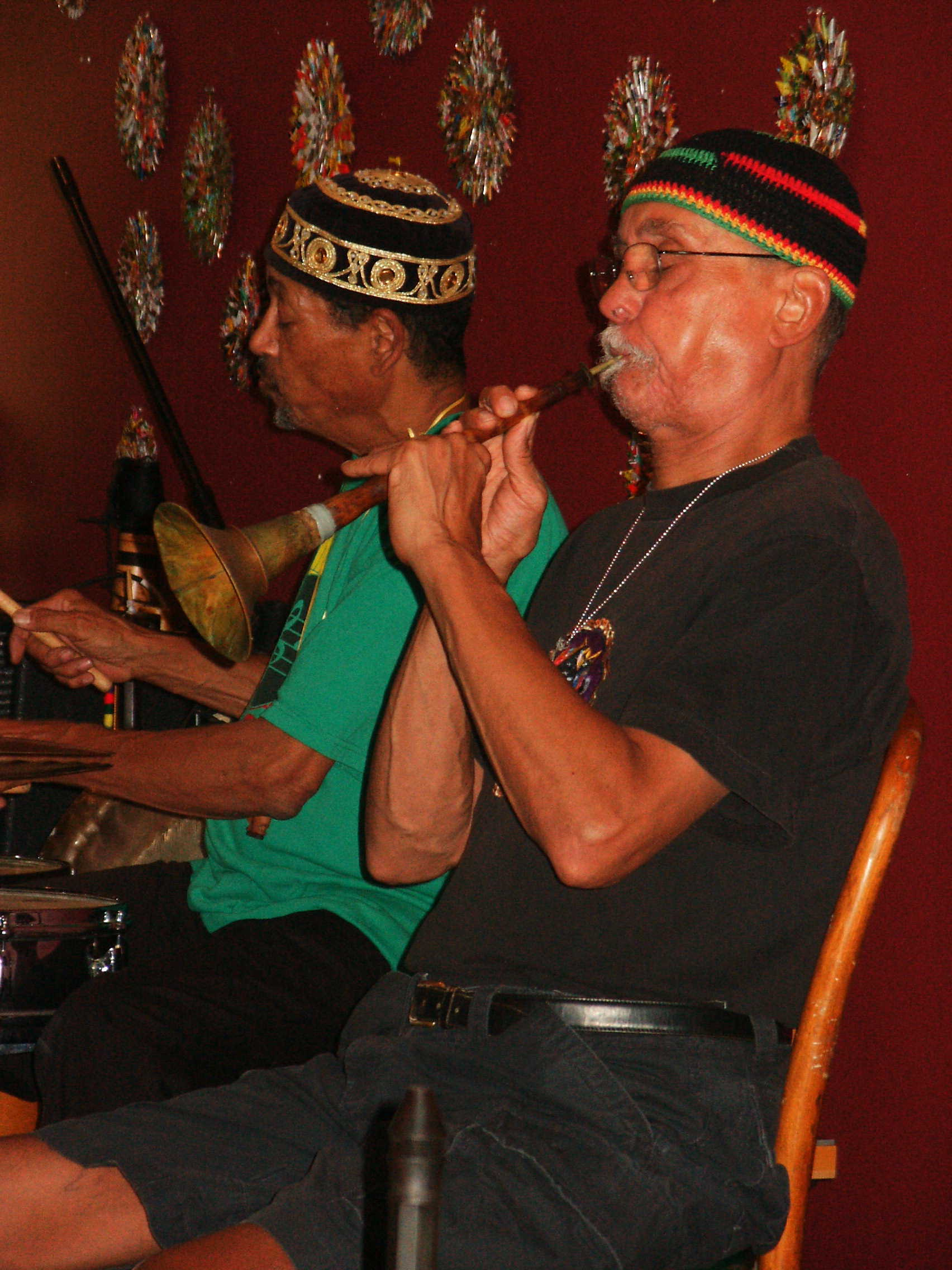
- Bill Cole (right) performing with Warren Smith in October 2005 in Takoma Park, Maryland

Background information
- Born: William Shadrack Cole; 1937 (age 88–89); Pittsburgh, Pennsylvania
- Genres: Avant-garde jazz; free jazz; experimental jazz; free Improvisation; atonality; dissonance
- Occupations: Musician (multi-instrumentalist); composer; professor of music; professor of African-American studies
- Instruments: Ghanaian atenteben; Chinese suona; Korean hojok; Korean piri; South Indian nagaswaram; North Indian shehnai; Tibetan trumpet; Australian didjeridu
- Years active: 1974 – present
- Label: Boxholder Records (de)
- Formerly of: Untempered Ensemble
- Spouse(s): Linda Joy Punchatz (maiden); m. 1967 Sarah Elizabeth Sully (maiden); m. 1982

Academic background
- Education: 1967: University of Pittsburgh, BA 1970: University of Pittsburgh, MA 1974: Wesleyan University, PhD (with highest honors) 1987: Dartmouth College, Honorary MA
- Influences: Miles Davis; John Coltrane; Clifford Thornton; Sam Rivers
- Website: billcole.org

William Shadrack Cole is an American jazz musician, ethnomusicologist, professor of music, professor of African-American studies, and author. As All About Jazz jazz journalist Dan McClenaghan put it, "Cole – a rare breed of jazz artist who has focused his efforts on uniting Eastern sounds with the American art form – is a musical seeker who has, over the better part of four decades [since 1974], mastered an array of non-traditional, non-Western [wind] instruments." Cole specializes in the Ghanaian atenteben, the Chinese suona, the Korean hojok and piri, the South Indian nagaswaram, the North Indian shehnai, the Tibetan trumpet, and the Australian didjeridu. Cole has a Ph.D. in ethnomusicology from Wesleyan University. Cole has written two books, one on Miles Davis and one on John Coltrane. Cole is the founder and leader of the Untempered Ensemble.

== Academic career ==
Cole was professor of music at Amherst College from 1972 to 1974 and at Dartmouth College from 1974 to 1990. Dartmouth awarded Cole tenure in 1979, full professorship in 1985, and an honorary degree in 1987. Cole, for three years, beginning 1981, was Chair of the Music Department. From 2005 to 2010, Cole was Professor of African American Studies at Syracuse University, where he served as Chair of the Department. Cole retired in 2010 as Professor Emeritus. Syracuse, in 2010, appointed Renate Simson, PhD (1934–2017), to succeed Cole. She was a scholar and teacher of 19th century African-American literature, as Chair of the Department.

Jazz multi-instrumentalist and ethnomusicologist Nathan Davis, PhD, was Cole's academic advisor when he was working on his master's degree at the University of Pittsburgh. Davis was Cole's first African-American teacher in all his formal education, stretching back to kindergarten. Clifford Thornton, PhD, was Cole's academic advisor when he was working on his doctorate at Wesleyan University. Cole also studied with Sam Rivers, visiting artist at Wesleyan.

== Musical collaborations ==
Cole has performed with Ornette Coleman, Jayne Cortez, Julius Hemphill, Sam Rivers, James Blood Ulmer, and Fred Ho.

== Books ==
1. Miles Davis: The Early Years (1974)
2. John Coltrane (1976).
  In his book about Coltrane, Cole states, "Wherein, then, lies the magic of this man's music? The answer, from my point of view, is that it dealt with human problems in human terms for human beings in a human world. If there is 'turmoil' in his music, it includes the turmoil in the hearts and minds of ordinary men and women. It includes the turmoil and violence of the times through which Trane lived. But the magic in Trane's music also must derive from the 'peace which passeth all understanding' that was in this man's heart." Later in the book, Cole reflects on the bombing of the 16th Street Baptist Church Birmingham that killed four African-American girls. He points out that the melodic line of "Alabama," composed and first recorded as a memorial to the tragedy by Coltrane November 18, 1963 – sixty-four days after the event – "was developed from the rhythmic inflections of a speech given by Dr. Martin Luther King."

Jazz critic John Wilson, in his review of Cole's book on Coltrane, stated, "Cole has done a painstaking job of analyzing the recordings, looking at them almost phrase by phrase (with the help of Andrew White's transcriptions)."

== Discography ==
=== Solo and with selected artists ===
1. The First Cycle (1980)
  Musicians: Bill Cole (Ghanaian flute, Chinese musette, Indian shenai, voice); Sam Rivers (tenor sax, piano); & Warren Smith (trap set, kettledrum, marimba, other percussive instruments)
  Recorded August 1, 1975, Spaulding Auditorium, Hopkins Center
  Music from Dartmouth (label)
  OCLC 13625717 (all editions)
2. Unsubmissive Blues (1980). Bill Cole & Jayne Cortez, Bola Press. Recorded October 1, 1979, Brooklyn
3. There It Is (1982). Jayne Cortez and the Firespitters, with Bill Cole. Bola Press. Recorded July 22, 1982, Brooklyn
4. Everywhere Drums (1990). Bill Cole & Jayne Cortez, Bola Press. Recorded June 21, 1990, New York
5. William Parker: Double Sunrise Over Neptune (2007)
  Musicians: *William Parker (bass); Lewis Barnes (trumpet); Rob Brown (alto sax); Hamid Drake (drums); Bill Cole (double Reeds); Shayna Dulberger (de) (bass); Sangeeta Bandyopadhyay (born 1974) (voice)
  Recorded June 19, 2007, at Vision Festival XII, New York.
  AUM Fidelity AUM 047.
  OCLC 716920267
6. Billy Bang and Bill Cole (2010). Billy Bang (violin); Bill Cole (didgeridoo, nagaswaram, sona, flute, shenai), Live, University of Virginia Chapel, Charlottesville, April 17, 2009. Shadrack
7. As If You Knew (2011)
  Jayne Cortez (reciter); the Firespitter Band (Denardo Coleman, drums; Bern Nix, guitar; Alex Harding, bari sax; Al MacDowell, bass; TK Blue, alto saxophone; Bill Cole, Indian shenai, Chinese sona)
  Bola Press
  OCLC 979986515
8. Joseph Daley – Portraits: Wind, Thunder and Love (2014)
  7. "Shadrack / Portrait of Bill Cole"
    Akua Dixon (soloist; cello); Bill Cole (soloist; nagaswarm)
  Recorded at MSR Sound April 24–25, 2012.
  ℗ JoDaMusic
9. Trayvon Martin Suite (2015). Bill Cole & Joseph Daley, ℗ JoDaMusic. (label of Joe Daley)
10. Bill Cole & William Parker – Two Masters (Live at the Prism) (2005)
  1. "Angels in Golden Mud"
  2. "Ojibwa Song"
  3. "Waterfalls of the South Bronx"
  4. "Bird and Branch"
  5. "Election Funeral Dance"
  6. "Ending Sequence and Sunset"
  Recorded live, direct to DAT, at the Prism, Charlottesville, Virginia, April 1, 2004
  Boxholder (de) BXH 047 (Note: Boxholder Records Inc. (de) was an American label incorporated March 16, 1999, in Vermont, by Lou Kannenstine (né Louis Fabian Kannenstine; 1938–2014). Boxholder specialized in producing CDs of avant-garde, free, and experimental jazz. Kannenstine and his wife, Peggy (née Margaret Lampe), ran Boxholder from their home at Rivendell Farm on Old River Road in Woodstock, Vermont.)
  OCLC 1078051725 (all editions)
11. Boy From Black Mountain (2009)
  Cole is an additional musician, playing the Chinese suona
  OCLC 430059891

=== Bill Cole's Untempered Ensemble ===
1. Vision ONE [excerpts from "Seasoning the Greens"] (1997). Arts for Art. Live at the Orensanz Art Center, Lower East Side, Manhattan, 2nd Annual Vision Festival, May 28 – June 1, 1997
  Musicians: Bill Cole (didgeridoo, shenai, bell, agogô, piri, nagaswaram, hojok, sona); Cooper-Moore (harp, flute, rim-d); William Parker (double bass); Joe Daley (tuba, baritone horn); Warren Smith (drums)
2. The Untempered Trio (1992).
  Musicians: Bill Cole (nagaswaram, hojok, sona, shenai, balaphone); Warren Smith (multi-percussion); Joe Daley (baritone horn, tuba, synthesizer). Recorded BMG Studios, New York, NY, November 22, 1991, and Howard Schwartz Studios, New York, NY, September 21, 1992. Shadrack Records. OCLC 35689489
  1. "Evil Sown By a Man Will Grow on His Children's Heads," composed by Cole
  2. "Peace for Nagaswarm," composed by Cole
  3. "Sayonara Baby," composed by Smith
  4. "Song for Clifford Thornton," composed by Cole
  5. "When the Needle Drops From the Leper's Hand He Struggles to Grasp It – So Struggles the Mind With a Difficult Problem," composed by Cole
  6. "Dear Sarah Sully," composed by Cole
  7. "Don't Let Politeness Make You Run the Risk of Contracting Disease," composed by Cole
  See: Clifford Thornton (1936–1989)
  Sarah Elizabeth Sully was Cole's wife, who he married April 24, 1982, in Hartford, Vermont.
  Titles for 1st, 5th, and 7th works are Yorùbá proverbs.
  OCLC 35689489
3. Untempered Ensemble Live in Greenfield, Massachusetts (2000). Bill Cole's Untempered Ensemble, Boxholder (de)
  Musicians: Bill Cole (didgeridoo, sona, Tibetan trumpet, hojok, shenai, nagaswaram, bamboo flute); Cooper-Moore (flute and hand-made instruments, mouth bow, harp (horizontal hoe-handle), rim-drums, three-string fretless banjo); Sam Furnace (de) (alto sax, flute); William Parker (double bass); Joe Daley (tuba, baritone horn); Warren Smith (trap drum set, gongs, marimba, dunno drum – one of several talking drums, hourglass shape, West Africa – rainsticks); Atticus Cole (congas, bongos, timbales, rainsticks)
  First CD:
  1. "Struggles of Fanny Lou Hamer"
  2. "The Short Life of Amadou Diallo"
  Second CD:
  3. "Freedom 1863: a fable"
    1. "Introduction"
    2. "Sojourner Truth"
    3. "Harriett Tubman"
    4. "Frederick Douglass"
    5. "W. E. B. Du Bois"
    6. "Marcus Garvey"
    7. "Interlude"
    8. "Medgar Evers"
    9. "Martin Luther King Jr."
    10. "Rosa Parks"
    11. "Barbara Jordan"
    12. "Malcolm X – El Hajj Malik El Shabazz"
  Boxholder (de) BXH008 & BXH009
  OCLC 56747508
4. Duets and Solos, Volume I" (2000); Boxholder (de) BXH 011
5. Duets and Solos, Volume II" (2001); Boxholder (de) BXH 015; OCLC 56672940
6. Seasoning the Greens (2002)
  1. "Introduction by Bill Cole" (spoken)
  2. "Grounded"
  3. "The Triple Towers of Kyongbokkang," by Warren Smith
  4. "South Indian Festival Rhythm"
  5. "Ghanaian Funeral Rhythm"
  6. "South Indian Marriage Rhythm"
  7. "Colombian Rhythm"
  8. "Free Rhythm"
  9. "A Man Sees a Snake, A Woman Kills It; No Matter, As Long as It Is Dead"
7. All compositions by Bill Cole, except as noted
8. Recorded at FlynnSpace, Burlington, Vermont, March 31, 2001
9. Boxholder (de) BXH 031
10. OCLC 56792406
11. Proverbs for Sam (2008)
  1. "Don't Wait For the Day of Battle Before Getting Your Weapons Ready"
  2. "If a Blacksmith Continues to Strike an Iron at One Point, He Must Have a Reason"
  3. "The Drum Sounding a Message in War Is Beaten in a Cryptic Manner"
  4. "No One Knows the Paths in a Garden Better Than the Gardener"
  The album, when released, was titled to honor saxophonist Sam Furnace, who died January 26, 2004.
  Musicians: Bill Cole Chinese sona, digeridoo, Indian shenai, Ghanaian flute, Indian nagaswarm); Sam Furnace (de) (alto saxophone, flute); Joseph Daley (baritone horn, tuba, trombone); William Parker (double bass); Warren Smith (percussion, marimba, voice, whistle); Cooper-Moore, diddly bow, rim drums, flute, voice); Atticus Cole (percussion)
  Proverbs 1–3 recorded live June 1, 2001, at the Vision Festival, Lower East Side, Manhattan. Proverb 4 recorded live March 31, 2001, at the Flynn Center for the Performing Arts, Burlington, Vermont
  Boxholder (de) BXH 056
  OCLC 399557131
12. Untempered Ensemble (2011)
  1. "A Man of Outstanding Quality Is Preeminent Among His Comrades"
  2. "Poverty Is the Father of Fear"
  3. "Hamsavazi E Tonbak O Nay"
  Boxholder (de)
13. Politicsm – A Tribute to Jayne Cortez (2013); Boxholder (de)
14. Sunsum (released December 29, 2014)
  Musicians: Bill Cole (didgeridoo, shenai, nagaswaram, suona, composition, liner notes); Joseph Daley (euphonium, tuba, percussion, arrangements); Ras Moshe (tenor saxophone, flute, percussion); Gerald Veasley (bass guitar); Lisette Santiago (percussion); Warren Smith (drums, percussion)
  1. "Grounded" (audio via YouTube)
  2. "The Dove Finds Peace Everywhere" (audio via YouTube)
  3. "Great Loss Is Yours if Your Love for Another Is Not Returned" (audio via YouTube)
  4. "A Scar Is Never so Smooth As Natural Skin" (audio via YouTube)
  5. "Evil Sown By a Man Will Grow on His Children's Heads" (audio via YouTube)
  Recorded July 7th, 2014, at the Clemente Soto Velez Cultural and Educational Center, Lower East Side, Manhattan as part of the Evolving Music Series of Arts of Art.
  Boxholder (de)
15. The Living Lives Not Among the Dead. Why Seek It There? Text by Chief Fela Sowande. Live recording, October 11, 2002, New York. Bill Cole (label) (2018)
  1. Part I
  2. Part II
  The performance was dedicated to Wilber Morris, bassist who died August 8, 2002.

== Videography ==
1. Rubble Dance – Long Island City (U-matic videocassette; 20 minutes). May–June 1991. OCLC 83574876.
  - Dancers: Douglas Dunn and dancers
  - Grazia Della-Terza
  - Grazia Della-Terza
  - Douglas Dunn
  - Sam Keany
  - Gwen Welliver
  - Christopher Caines
  - Laura Oguiza
  - Presented by Douglas Dunn and Rudy Burckhardt
  - Produced by Elisabeth Powers
  - Directed by Rudy Burckhardt
  - Cameras by Christopher Sweet and Jacob Burckhardt
  - Choreography by Douglas Dunn
  - Musical score by Bill Cole
  - Sound effects (jungle and city sounds) by Richard Kostelanetz
  - Costumes by Mimi Gross
  - Musicians
  - Robert Black (double bass)
  - Warren Smith (percussion)
2. Cocca Mocca (VHS). May 1, 1998. OCLC 44521889.
  - Dancers: Douglas Dunn and Dancers
  - Douglas Dunn
  - Guadelupe Martinez
  - Le Minh Tam (Trio 1)
  - Brooke Davila
  - Monica Olsson
  - Michelle Olson (Trio 2)
  - Terrence Brown
  - Georgia Corner
  - Bill Hedberg (Trio 3)
  - Stefanie Bland
  - Janet Charleston
  - Edmund Melville (Trio 4)
  - Grazia Della-Terza (walk-on)
  - Music by Bill Cole
  - Esther Lamneck
  - Warren Smith
  - Gamelan Son of Lion (Sasha Bogdanowitsch, Darryl Gregory, Lisa Karrer, David Simons)
  - Set design by Mimi Gross
  - Costumes by Charles Atlas
  - Lighting by Carol Mullins

== Attacks by the Dartmouth Review ==
Prologue
The Dartmouth Review – an arch-conservative publication founded in 1980, not affiliated with the college but operated by students – had been part of an aggressive movement to criticize Dartmouth's academic programs in non-Eurocentric disciplines, including Women's Studies, African-American Studies and ethnomusicology. The Review had published provocative criticism of its interpretation of political correctness on subjects ranging from Apartheid in South Africa to sexual orientation to race. William F. Buckley Jr., and his publication, the National Review, supported the Review with (i) funding and (ii), from 1982 to 1998, more than two dozen editorials by authors that included Laura Ingraham (then a student), Jeffrey Hart (Dartmouth faculty member whose son, Benjamin, had been an editor for the Review), and David Boaz.

Part One
Beginning in 1983, the Review ran a series of antagonistic articles that harshly ridiculed Cole, personally and professionally. Laura Ingraham, then a student, authored the first one in January 1983. Dinesh D'Souza, then a student, was the paper's chairman; Edmond William Cattan Jr., was editor-in-chief. After two local newspapers cited the Review and declared Cole "incompetent", Cole sued the Review for slander. Also, Cole, in April 1983, filed a libel suit in Burlington's U.S. District Court for $600,000 against the publisher (Hanover Review, Inc.), D'Souza, Cattan, and Ingraham – but later dropped that suit. The slander case was settled out of court after two years without the Review admitting guilt or providing any monetary compensation, but both the Review's and Cole's reputations were damaged.

Part Two
In 1988, four students who were Review journalists – John William Quilhot (with a camera), John Henby Sutter (with a tape recorder), Christopher Baldwin (with a printout of the Review's editorial policy statement), and Sean Nolan – all white, showed up to Cole's classroom, after class, to give Cole a copy of the editorial policy and demand an apology for his remarks during the second of two phone calls made in an attempt to give him an opportunity to reply to the article, "Dartmouth's Dynamic Duo of Mediocrity", of February 24, 1988. The confrontation grew into an altercation, for about five minutes, during which Quilhot was taking photos. Cole grabbed Quilhot's arm, which, among other things, resulted in damaging the camera flash. Dartmouth College charged all four with harassment and disorderly conduct, and suspended the first three – Quilhot until fall 1988 (two quarters), Sutter until fall 1989 (four quarters), and Baldwin until fall 1989 (four quarters). Nolan was placed on disciplinary probation for four quarters. A lawsuit, in Federal Court, against the college, filed in 1989 by the Review, ensued. On January 3, 1989, the Grafton County Superior Court, in state court parallel litigation, revoked the suspensions of Sutter and Baldwin. The Federal Court later dismissed the suit against Dartmouth College.

When 60 Minutes aired a segment about the lawsuit November 13, 1988, Morley Safer, the host, left out the Review's political connections. Quilhot was subsequently invited by then Senator Dan Quayle to spend his summer suspension as an unpaid volunteer in his Washington office. Esi Eggleston Bracey ('91), then a student who witnessed the confrontation told PBS Frontline, "That moment let me know that there are people in the world who hate you just because of your color ... not dislike you, or choose not to be friends with you, but hate you".

Epilogue
In August 1990 – after sixteen years at Dartmouth with tenure, under duress of seven years of repeated attacks by the Review – Cole resigned. "I was totally blackballed." A year later, as a guest lecturer in Bill Dixon's class at Bennington College, Cole reflected on the cost of success in a White world: "I was taught all my life that if you get an education, things will open up. But what I learned is if you want to help your own people, it won't open up." "You have to sell yourself out enough so when you look in the mirror in the morning, you don't know who that is".

== Family ==
Cole was born to William Lucius "John" Cole (1896–1961) and Gladys Alice Seel (1902–1997). Cole, a Miles Davis scholar, shared a distinction with Miles. Both of their fathers were dentists. Cole's first wife, Linda Joy Punchatz (maiden), an artist, is a niece of the late science fiction and fantasy artist Don Ivan Punchatz (1936–2009), whose son, Gregor Punchatz (her cousin), is a digital artist for film and video games.

== Bibliography ==
=== References ===
- "Dartmouth Professor Drops Libel Suit Against Student Paper". Associated Press. May 30, 1985.
- Casey, John Dudley (February 26, 1989). "At Dartmouth – The Clash of '89". New York Times Magazine. Vol. 138, no. 47793. pp. 28–30, 66–68, 77. ISSN 0028-7822. OCLC 21129666. EBSCOhost 8903130017. Alternate URL
- Cole, William "Bill" Shadrack (1994) [1974]. Miles Davis – The Early Years. Da Capo Press. ISBN 0-306-80554-5. LCCN 93-36391. OCLC 28848744 – via Internet Archive.
- Cole, Bill (1976). John Coltrane. Schirmer. ISBN 978-0-3068-1062-6. LCCN 76-14289. OCLC 680351269 – via Internet Archive.
- Cole, Malvine (January 3, 1989). "Highly Literate Teacher". Letters to the Editor. Rutland Daily Herald. Vol. 133, no. 2. p. 15. LCCN sn86-071669. OCLC 11902841 – via Newspapers.com.
- Locher, Francis C., ed. (1981). "Cole, William Shadrack". Contemporary authors, v. 101. Contemporary Authors: A bio-bibliographical guide to current writers in fiction, general nonfiction, poetry, journalism, drama, motion pictures, television, and other fields. Vol. 101. Detroit: Gale Research International, Limited. p. 120. ISBN 0-8103-1901-2. ISSN 0010-7468. LCCN 62-52046. OCLC 24564692.
- Crabtree, Peter (October 31, 1991). "In Shooting Aftermath, Talk of Bias". Rutland Daily Herald. Vol. 135, no. 261. pp. 1, 6. LCCN sn86-071669. OCLC 11902841 – via Newspapers.com.
- Emmons, Jim (March 25, 1988). "Cole Still Plays His Music Amid Din of Controversy". Vermont Report. Rutland Daily Herald. Vol. 132, no. 73. p. 7. LCCN sn86-071669. OCLC 11902841 – via Newspapers.com.
- Enslin, Rob (July 20, 2010). "Rennie Simson Named Chair of SU's African American Studies". Syracuse University News.
- Farnsworth, Steve (February 1, 1983). "Over Review Attack – Professor May Quit". Vermont Report. Rutland Daily Herald. Vol. 129, no. 27. pp. 5 & 7. LCCN sn86-071669. OCLC 11902841 – via Newspapers.com.
- Ford, Jane (April 18, 2007). "Master Musician Bill Cole to Perform at 214 Community Art Center April 26". UVA Today. Archived from the original on November 7, 2016.
- Ford, Jane (April 3, 2009). "U. Va. Presents an Evening of Jazz With Billy Bang and Bill Cole". UVA Today. Archived from the original on April 29, 2021.
- Woodruff, Judy; Thomas Lennon (May 10, 1988). "Racism 101". Frontline. PBS. OCLC 23351912.
- Gardner, Howard (2004). "Leading an Institution: How to Deal With a Uniform Population". Changing Minds – The Art and Science of Changing Our Own and Other Peoples. Leadership for the Common Good (series). Harvard Business Publishing. pp. 93–94, 96–100, 102–103. ISBN 1-4221-0329-3. LCCN 2003-019437. OCLC 71261262 – via Internet Archive.
- Ho, Fred Wei-Han (2008). "Bill Cole:African American Musician of the Asian Double Reeds". In Ho, Fred Wei-Han; Mullen, Bill V. (eds.). Afro Asia: Revolutionary Political and Cultural Connections Between African Americans and Asian Americans. Durham, NC: Duke University Press. pp. 256–264, esp. 263f. ISBN 978-0822381174. OCLC 1226706442.
- Ingraham, Laura (October 24, 1984). "Bill Cole's Song and Dance". The Dartmouth Review.
  - —— (May 9, 2016). "Bill Cole's Song and Dance". The Dartmouth Review. Vol. 36, no. 3. p. 8 – via Issuu.
- "Cole, William Shadrack". Who's Who in America: 70th Platinum Anniversary ed. Who's Who in America. Marquis Who's Who. n.d. ISBN 978-0-8379-7062-2. OCLC 4780345346.
- Monroe, Steve (September 2015). "Bill Cole Group Plays Next for Transparent Productions". Jazz Avenues. East of the River Magazine. Archived from the original on 2016-11-07.
  - —— (September 2015). "Bill Cole Group Plays Next for Transparent Productions". Jazz Avenues. East of the River Magazine. p. 40.
- Moses, Desiré (November 17, 2016). "American Jazz Great Bill Cole Reveals New Work ['A Piece for Peace']". C-Ville Weekly. OCLC 31820304.
- "Education: Target of Paper's Barbs Resigns At Dartmouth". The New York Times. Vol. 139, no. 46355. August 22, 1990. p. B7. (alternate URL (subscription required))
- Reidinger, Paul A. (February 1990). "Sue U: From Classroom to Courtroom". Trends in the Law. ABA Journal. 76 (2). American Bar Association: 82, 84–86. ISSN 0747-0088. JSTOR 20760893. OCLC 5556350127.
- Selya, Bruce M.; Aldrich, Bailey; Gibson, Floyd R. (November 9, 1989). "The Dartmouth Review v. Dartmouth College". Open Jurist. F2d (889): 13.
- Safer, Morley; Freedman, James O.; Baldwin, Christopher E.; Cole, Bill; Hart, Jeffrey (November 13, 1988). "Dartmouth v. Dartmouth". 60 Minutes (VHS). CBS News. OCLC 19007739.
- Sullivan, Eamonn (August 21, 1990). "Cole Quits As Dartmouth Professor – Dartmouth Review Flap Involved Music Teacher". Southern Vermont. Rutland Daily Herald. Vol. 134, no. 201. Rutland, Vermont. pp. 6, 7. LCCN sn86-071669. OCLC 11902841 – via Newspapers.com.
- Wilson, John (June 1977). "John Coltrane" (PDF). High Fidelity (Book Review). Vol. 27, no. 6. pp. 137–138 – via World Radio History.

=== Album reviews ===
- Aaron, S. Victor (August 15, 2011). "Untempered Ensemble – Untempered Ensemble (2011)". Something Else! (webzine).
- Bivins, Jason C. (Winter 2009). "Bill Cole's Untempered Ensemble – Proverbs for Sam". Signal to Noise. No. 52. OCLC 1078026911 – via ISSUU.
- McClenaghan, Daniel Richard (August 9, 2008). "Proverbs for Sam". All About Jazz (Review).
- Nastos, Michael George (n.d.). "Bill Cole's Untempered Ensemble: Proverbs for Sam". AllMusic (Review). mw0001236834.
- Shanley, Michael C. (April 1, 2009). "Bill Cole: Proverbs for Sam". JazzTimes (Review).
- Wiener, Jon (2002) [February 27, 1989]. "Racial Hatred on Campus: Reagan's Children". In Giddings, Paula (ed.). Burning All Illusions: Writings From The Nation on Race, 1866–2002. New York: Thunder's Mouth Press/Nation Books. pp. 381–389. ISBN 978-1-5602-5384-6. LCCN 2002-103622. OCLC 49793520 – via Internet Archive.
- Wilmoth, Charlie (January 27, 2003). "Bill Cole's Untempered Ensemble – Seasoning the Greens". Dusted Reviews. Dusted. OCLC 873184083. Archived from the original on March 22, 2015.

=== Discography references ===
- "Bill Cole Discography". Discogs. n.d. 376244.
- "Joe Daley Discography". Discogs. n.d. 260584.
- "Bill Cole's Untempered Ensemble Discography". Discogs. n.d. 376237.
- Lord, Tom, ed. (n.d.). "Bill Cole". The Jazz Discography Online (musician ID 29474). Chilliwack, British Columbia: Lord Music Reference Inc. OCLC 182585494.
