= Prayer for Peace (Billy Bang album) =

Studio album by Billy Bang
- Released: July 20, 2010
- Recorded: August 30 and 31, 2005
- Studios: Avatar (New York, New York)
- Genre: Jazz
- Labels: Tum Records; CD 018
- Producer: Petri Haussila

Billy Bang chronology
Four Seasons - East meets West (2009)	Prayer for Peace (2010)	Billy Bang/Bill Cole (2010)

Prayer for Peace is an album by violinist Billy Bang. It was recorded on August 30 and 31, 2005, at Avatar Studios in New York City, and was released in 2010 by Tum Records. On the album, Bang is joined by trumpeter James Zollar, pianist Andrew Bemkey, double bassist Todd Nicholson, drummer Newman Taylor Baker, and, on two tracks, percussionists Milton Cardona and Joe Gonzalez.

Regarding the album title, Bang wrote:

"We do not need war, any kind of war, especially within our homes, our families, our loved ones. Our own unfortunate acts lead to petty arguments, bickering, ugly squabbles and nasty, unnecessary fights. We should search for true harmony and humbleness in our lives. We should listen to each other, and be good to each other."

== Reception ==
Professional ratings
Review scores
Source	Rating
All About Jazz	4.5/5 stars
AllMusic	4/5 stars
PopMatters	7/10 stars
Tom Hull – on the Web	A

In a review for AllMusic, Michael G. Nastos wrote: "The partnership established between all of these musicians is rare, and as unique unto itself as any other ensemble Billy Bang has ever assembled. This CD comes with a very high recommendation, containing music even skeptics of Bang's previous outings can easily enjoy."

Chris Barton of the Los Angeles Times stated: "listeners who might ordinarily shy away from the at-times turbulent world of free jazz shouldn't miss this recording, a rewarding and often gorgeous record that hopefully will remedy Bang's comparatively low profile." He praised the title track, commenting: "Some might still call it avant-garde, but leave it to a man who took his name from a cartoon to prove labels don't mean a thing."

Writing for All About Jazz, Troy Collins remarked: "Bang's eclectic conception is one of exaltation, not excoriation; his quintet conveys its enthusiasm with a feverish vitality reminiscent of the violinist's seminal loft era days, delivering expressive testimonials with a sense of ardor undiminished by frustration or rage."

PopMatters's John Garratt called the album "a subtle yet worthy addition" to Bang's recorded output, and called the group "an able ensemble in the face of stylistic diversity."

In an article for The Village Voice, Tom Hull awarded the album a grade of "A", and wrote: "Joy all around, from Stuff Smith well beyond Sun Ra, with James Zollar's tart trumpet challenging Bang’s razor-sharp violin."

S. Victor Aaron of Something Else! stated: "Prayer For Peace is a record that doesn’t pack the punch of the gravitas that made Bang's Vietnam albums essential, but it makes its impact sure enough with repeated listens. Billy Bang maintains his status of being one of the most important jazz violinists of the last couple of generations with this release, and that's enough to please any fan of—or newcomer to—his music."

== Track listing ==
1. "Only Time Will Tell" (Stuff Smith) – 7:11
2. "At Play in the Fields of the Lord" (Billy Bang) – 9:32
3. "Dance of the Manakin" (Billy Bang) – 9:58
4. "Prayer for Peace" (Billy Bang) – 19:55
5. "Chan Chan" (Compay Segundo) – 7:02
6. "Dark Silhouette" (Billy Bang) – 9:36
7. "Jupiter's Future" (Billy Bang) – 6:31

== Personnel ==
- Billy Bang – violin
- James Zollar – trumpet, flugelhorn
- Andrew Bemkey – piano
- Todd Nicholson – double bass
- Newman Taylor Baker – drums
- Milton Cardona – conga, percussion (tracks 2 and 5)
- Joe Gonzalez – bongos, percussion (tracks 2 and 5)
