= Anderson v. Martin =

- Supreme Court of the United States

Argued November 20, 1963 Decided January 13, 1964
- Full case name: Dupuy H. Anderson v. Wade O. Martin, Jr
- Citations: 375 U.S. 399 (more) 84 S.Ct. 454, 11 L.Ed.2d 430

Case history
- Prior: Dupuy H. Anderson and Acie J. Belton, Complainants, v. Wade O. Martin, jr, E.D. La.

Holding
- Compulsory designation by Louisiana of the race of the candidate on the ballot operates as a discrimination against appellants, and is violative of the Equal Protection Clause of the Fourteenth Amendment.

Court membership
- Chief Justice Earl Warren Associate Justices Hugo Black · William O. Douglas; Tom C. Clark · John M. Harlan II; William J. Brennan Jr. · Potter Stewart; Byron White · Arthur Goldberg

Case opinion
- Majority: Clark, joined by unanimous

Laws applied
- U.S. Const. amend. XIV

Anderson v. Martin, 375 U.S. 399, was a 1964 United States Supreme Court case in which the Court held unconstitutional a Louisiana statute that required that the race of all candidates be listed on ballots.

== Background ==
In 1962, African-American Democratic candidates for the school board elections of East Baton Rouge Parish filed suit against the Louisiana Secretary of State to stop enforcement of Act 538 of the 1960 Louisiana Legislature, § 1174.1 of Title 18 of the Louisiana Revised Statutes. This law requires the race of the candidate to be printed in parentheses next to the candidate's name, which they alleged violated the 14th Amendment and 15th Amendment. The United States District Court denied requests for a temporary restraining order and injunctions. Soon after, the plaintiffs amended their complaint on the basis that they lost on the election due to the law in question.

== See also ==
- List of United States Supreme Court cases, volume 375
