= Louisiana Power & Light Co. v. City of Thibodaux =

- Supreme Court of the United States

Argued April 2, 1959 Decided June 8, 1959
- Full case name: Louisiana Power & Light Co. v. City of Thibodaux
- Citations: 360 U.S. 25 (more) 79 S. Ct. 1070; 3 L. Ed. 2d 1058

Case history
- Prior: City of Thibodaux v. La. Power & Light Co., 153 F. Supp. 515 (E.D. La. 1957); reversed, 255 F.2d 774 (5th Cir. 1958); cert. granted, 358 U.S. 893 (1958).
- Subsequent: Rehearing denied, 360 U.S. 940 (1959); on remand, 225 F. Supp. 657 (E.D. La. 1963); affirmed in part, reversed in part, 373 F.2d 870 (5th Cir. 1967); cert. denied, 389 U.S. 975 (1967).

Court membership
- Chief Justice Earl Warren Associate Justices Hugo Black · Felix Frankfurter; William O. Douglas · Tom C. Clark; John M. Harlan II · William J. Brennan Jr. Charles E. Whittaker · Potter Stewart

Case opinions
- Majority: Frankfurter, joined by Black, Clark, Harlan, Whittaker
- Concurrence: Stewart
- Dissent: Brennan, joined by Warren, Douglas

Louisiana Power & Light Co. v. City of Thibodaux, 360 U.S. 25 (1959), was a case in which the Supreme Court created a new doctrine of abstention.

== Case ==
The city of Thibodaux, citing a 1900 state law, Act 111, sought to condemn buildings, land, equipment, poles, lines, and other properties that belonged to the Louisiana Power and Light Company and that were located in areas that had recently been annexed by the city. The company, a Florida corporation, challenged the city's authority to condemn only a part of a utility system. The case was originally brought in the Louisiana state courts, but then removed to the United States district court on the grounds of diversity of citizenship, the petitioner being a Florida corporation.

Although the 1900 law had never been judicially interpreted, it had been cited in a similar case by the state's Attorney General, who had concluded that a city of Louisiana did not possess the authority under that law that was being asserted by the city of Thibodaux.

The district court, on its own motion, stayed further proceedings in order to allow the Supreme Court of Louisiana to interpret Act 111. An appeals court rejected the district court's action. On appeal to the U.S. Supreme Court, the district court ruling was affirmed on the grounds that eminent domain is “intimately involved with sovereign prerogative,” that the Louisiana law cited was unclear, and that a federal ruling based upon that law could therefore not be determinative.

The case was argued before the Supreme Court on April 2, 1959, and decided on June 8, 1959.

=== Result ===
The court, overturning the Court of Appeals decision, concluded that “the District Court properly exercised the power it had in this case to stay proceedings pending a prompt state court construction of a state statute of dubious meaning.”

=== Majority opinion ===
The majority in Thibodaux consisted of Justices Black, Clark, Frankfurter, Harlan, Whittaker, and Stewart; the majority opinion was written by Justice Frankfurter.

The majority held that the district court's abstention was justified because the issue of eminent domain was “intimately involved with the sovereign prerogative.” Given that such matters “normally turn on legislation with much local variation interpreted in local settings,” it was proper for federal courts to defer to state courts “in a matter close to the political interests of a State” in the interests of “harmonious federal-state relations.” The majority also noted that the district court had not abdicated jurisdiction but simply postponed it, allowing for the possibility of the case being returned to the district court following a declaratory judgment about the state law by a Louisiana court.

The majority cited Justice Holmes's dissenting opinion in Madisonville Traction Co. v. St. Bernard Mining Co.: “The fundamental fact is that eminent domain is a prerogative of the state which, on the one hand, may be exercised in any way that the state thinks fit, and, on the other, may not be exercised except by an authority which the state confers.” The majority, specifically citing Railroad Commission v. Pullman Co., further noted: “We have increasingly recognized the wisdom of staying actions in the federal courts pending determination by a state court of decisive issues of state law.” The majority opinion went on to say that:

The special nature of eminent domain justifies a district judge, when his familiarity with the problems of local law so counsels him, to ascertain the meaning of a disputed state statute from the only tribunal empowered to speak definitively – the courts of the State under whose statute eminent domain is sought to be exercised – rather than himself make a dubious and tentative forecast. This course does not constitute abnegation of judicial duty. On the contrary, it is a wise and productive discharge of it. There is only postponement of decision for its best fruition.

The court then applied these principles to the specific case:

In providing on his own motion for a stay in this case, an experienced district judge was responding in a sensible way to a quandary about the power of the City of Thibodaux into which he was placed by an opinion of the Attorney General of Louisiana in which it was concluded that, in a strikingly similar case, a Louisiana city did not have the power here claimed by the City. A Louisiana statute apparently seems to grant such a power. But that statute has never been interpreted, in respect to a situation like that before the judge, by the Louisiana courts, and it would not be the first time that the authoritative tribunal has found in a statute less than meets the outsider's eye. Informed local courts may find meaning not discernible to the outsider. The consequence of allowing this to come to pass would be that this case would be the only case in which the Louisiana statute is construed as we would construe it, whereas the rights of all other litigants would be thereafter governed by a decision of the Supreme Court of Louisiana quite different from ours. Caught between the language of an old but uninterpreted statute and the pronouncement of the Attorney General of Louisiana, the district judge determined to solve his conscientious perplexity by directing utilization of the legal resources of Louisiana for a prompt ascertainment of meaning through the only tribunal whose interpretation could be controlling – the Supreme Court of Louisiana. The District Court was thus exercising a fair and well considered judicial discretion in staying proceedings pending the institution of a declaratory judgment action and subsequent decision by the Supreme Court of Louisiana.

Finally, the majority claimed that the present case was “totally unlike” another case that had been decided that same day, County of Allegheny v. Mashuda Co., “except for the coincidence that both cases involve eminent domain proceedings.” In Mashuda, the Court held that a district court had been in error when it dismissed a complaint, and that, since the state law in question was clear and “only factual issues need be resolved,” there was no just reason “to refrain from prompt adjudication.”

=== Dissent ===
Justices Warren, Douglas, and Brennan dissented; Justice Brennan wrote the dissent.

The dissent argued that when a district court is presented with a case between citizens of different states, it is disrespectful to the concept of diversity jurisdiction to send the case to a state court. A judge can abdicate his duty, wrote Justice Brennan, “only in the exceptional circumstances where the order to the parties to repair to the state court would clearly serve one of two important countervailing interests: either the avoidance of a premature and perhaps unnecessary decision of a serious federal constitutional question or the avoidance of the hazard of unsettling some delicate balance in the area of federal-state relationships.” Justice Brennan, too, cited Railroad Commission v. Pullman Co., in which “this Court held that the District Court should have stayed its hand while state issues were resolved in a state court when an injunction was sought to restrain the enforcement of the order of a state administrative body on the ground that the order was not authorized by the state law and was violative of the Federal Constitution.”

Justice Brennan pointed out that the Supreme Court had “upheld an abstention when the exercise by the federal court of jurisdiction would disrupt a state administrative process” (Burford v. Sun Oil Co.) or “interfere with the collection of state taxes” (Toomer v. Witsell), or “otherwise create needless friction by unnecessarily enjoining state officials from executing domestic policies” (Alabama Public Service Commission v. Southern R. Co.). But no such circumstances, he stated, were present in the Louisiana case:

There is no more possibility of conflict with the State in this situation than there is in the ordinary negligence or contract case in which a District Court applies state law under its diversity jurisdiction. A decision by the District Court in this case would not interfere with Louisiana administrative processes, prohibit the collection of state taxes, or otherwise frustrate the execution of state domestic policies. Quite the reverse, this action is part of the process which the City must follow in order to carry out the State's policy of expropriating private property for public uses. Finally, in this case, the State of Louisiana, represented by its constituent organ the City of Thibodaux, urges the District Court to adjudicate the state law issue. How, conceivably, can the Court justify the abdication of responsibility to exercise jurisdiction on the ground of avoiding interference and conflict with the State when the State itself desires the federal court's adjudication? It is obvious that the abstention in this case was for the convenience of the District Court, not for the State.

== Thibodaux abstention ==
The issues addressed in Thibodaux had previously been the subject of an earlier Supreme Court case, Railroad Commission v. Pullman Co. (1941), which established a principle called the "Pullman abstention".

Although the decisions in the two cases were similar, what set Thibodaux apart was that it did not involve a constitutional issue that could be avoided or modified by a state court interpretation of some underlying issue of state law. In Thibodaux, a ruling at the federal level would have amounted to an interpretation of a vague Louisiana law and, thus, a determination of the circumstances under which the city could or could not exercise the power it claimed to have under the 1900 Louisiana law.

The decision in Thibodaux gave rise to a new principle, the "Thibodaux abstention", which is defined as "[a] federal court’s act of declining to exercise its jurisdiction to allow a state court to decide difficult issues [o]f importance in order to avoid unnecessary friction between federal and state authorities".

A key difference between the Pullman and Thibodaux doctrines is that under Pullman the court retains jurisdiction over federal issues and does not dismiss the case, while under the Thibodaux doctrine the case will, in fact, be dismissed in some instances.

There are several other federal abstention doctrines that derive from various Supreme Court cases, including the so-called Younger and Colorado River abstentions. The Burford abstention, derived from Burford v. Sun Oil Co. (1943), in which a federal court sent a dispute over oil-drilling rights to a Texas court that was far more familiar with the issues involved, is similar to the Thibodaux abstention, and some abstentions are in fact identified as Burford-Thibodaux or Thibodaux-Burford abstentions.

== Allegheny County v. Frank Mashuda Co. ==
A number of observers have commented on the difference between the rulings in Thibodaux and Allegheny County v. Frank Mashuda Co., which involved the question of whether a plaintiff's property could be confiscated under eminent domain in order to enlarge a private airport. In Allegheny County, the Court did not allow for abstention. “The apparent inconsistency between the two decisions has been the subject of considerable law review commentary,” notes one observer.
