= Billy Bang/Bill Cole =

Live album by Billy Bang and Bill Cole
- Released: 2010
- Recorded: April 17, 2009
- Venue: University of Virginia Chapel, Charlottesville, Virginia
- Genre: Free Improvisation
- Length: 42:01
- Label: Shadrack

Billy Bang chronology
Prayer for Peace (2010)	Billy Bang/Bill Cole (2010)	Black Man's Blues (2011)

Billy Bang/Bill Cole is a live album by violinist Billy Bang and multi-instrumentalist Bill Cole. It was recorded on April 17, 2009, at the University of Virginia Chapel in Charlottesville, Virginia, and was released in 2010 by Cole's Shadrack label. On the album, which features three compositions and three free improvisations, Cole performs on flute, digeridoo, nadaswaram, suona, and shehnai.

== Reception ==
Professional ratings
Review scores
Source	Rating
All About Jazz	5/5 stars
PopMatters	7/10 stars
Tom Hull – on the Web	B+

In a review for All About Jazz, Raul d'Gama Rose stated that the album "will remain one of the most mystical confluences in music to be captured on record," with Bang "at the height of his powers" and Cole inventing "a singular improvisatory language." He commented: "The otherworldly charm of the album makes it all the more enduring."

Mike Shanley of JazzTimes wrote: "In some ways, the combination can be a little unsettling in its dissonance, especially when both men kick up the energy. But when Bang quotes 'Take the A Train' and Sun Ra's 'Space Is the Place' in 'Jupiter's Future,' he proves that a jazz mindset still underscores this music."

Writing for PopMatters, John Garratt remarked: "The music that the two of them create spontaneously is elastic, weird, and indescribably moving... [it] is the kind of collaborative live album that pulls out all the stops and just runs with it. Exactly what 'it' is isn't easily defined, nor should we expect it to be. This is music that exists by floating, so I say let it."

The New York City Jazz Record's Clifford Allen stated that the six tracks "exemplify the honest, simple air at the heart of Bang's playing," and noted: "this collaboration with Bill Cole is a fitting and immediate reflection on his instrumental conception, rapport and raw, poetic emotionalism."

Bruce Lee Gallanter of the Downtown Music Gallery called the album "superb," stating that the musicians "make a perfect pair of heavy spirits," and commenting: "Bang-Cole are a most extraordinary duo to be reckoned with."

== Track listing ==
1. "Improvisation" – 10:12
2. "Shades of Kia Mia" (Billy Bang) – 8:23
3. "Poverty is the Father of Fear" (Bill Cole) – 7:22
4. "Improvisation" – 5:31
5. "Jupiter's Future" (Billy Bang) – 7:12
6. "Improvisation" – 3:25

== Personnel ==
- Billy Bang – violin
- Bill Cole – flute, digeridoo, nadaswaram, suona, shehnai
