= Hunter v. City of Pittsburgh =

- Supreme Court of the United States

Argued October 25–28, 1907 Decided November 18, 1907
- Full case name: D. Hunter, Jr., [et al.] v. City of Pittsburgh
- Citations: 207 U.S. 161 (more) 28 S. Ct. 40; 52 L. Ed. 151

Case history
- Subsequent: Case

Holding
- States have supreme sovereignty over their local governments.

Court membership
- Chief Justice Melville Fuller Associate Justices John M. Harlan · David J. Brewer; Edward D. White · Rufus W. Peckham; Joseph McKenna · Oliver W. Holmes Jr. William R. Day · William H. Moody

Case opinion
- Majority: Moody, joined by unanimous

Laws applied
- U.S. Const. article I and amend. XIV

Hunter v. Pittsburgh, 207 U.S. 161 (1907), is a landmark case that confirmed the supreme sovereignty of a state over its municipalities.

== Background ==
In 1906, Pennsylvania passed a law permitting the joining of adjacent municipalities if, during an election regarding the issue, the majority of all votes passed approve the union. Subsequently, the City of Pittsburgh filed in state court to begin the process of an election regarding joining with the City of Allegheny, Pennsylvania. Allegheny pushed back but was turned down in court.

The election was allowed to continue, and a majority of all voters in the two cities combined voted for joining. The vast majority of voters in Allegheny voted in opposition, and most of the votes in favor came from Pittsburgh. However, because the majority of the total votes were in favor, the Supreme Court of Pennsylvania ruled the union constitutional under Pennsylvania law. Plaintiffs appealed under the United States Constitution's Contract Clause (Article 1, Section 10, Paragraph 1) and the Due Process Clause of the Fourteenth Amendment.

== Decision ==
The United States Supreme Court unanimously ruled that the Pennsylvania law violated neither Article I nor the Fourteenth Amendment of the Constitution. Some important lines from the opinion concerning the supremacy of states over the municipalities include the following:

- "We have nothing to do with the policy, wisdom, justice, or fairness of the act under consideration; those questions are for the consideration of those to whom the state has intrusted its legislative power, and their determination of them is not subject to review or criticism by this court. We have nothing to do with the interpretation of the Constitution of the state and the conformity of the enactment of the assembly to that Constitution; those questions are for those consideration of the courts of the state, and their decision of them is final. The 5th Amendment to the Constitution of the United States is not restrictive of state, but only of national, action."
- "This [claim] does not rest upon the theory that the charter of the city is a contract with the state, a proposition frequently denied by this and other courts."
- "Municipal corporations are political subdivisions of the state, created as convenient agencies for exercising such of the governmental powers of the state as may be entrusted to them.... The number, nature, and duration of the powers conferred upon these corporations and the territory over which they shall be exercised rests in the absolute discretion of the state."
- "The state, therefore, at its pleasure, may modify or withdraw all such powers, may take without compensation such property, hold it itself, or vest it in other agencies, expand or contract the territorial area, unite the whole or a part of it with another municipality, repeal the charter and destroy the corporation. All this may be done, conditionally or unconditionally, with or without the consent of the citizens, or even against their protest. In all these respects the state is supreme, and its legislative body, conforming its action to the state Constitution, may do as it will, unrestrained by any provision of the Constitution of the United States."
- "Although the inhabitants and property owners may, by such changes, suffer inconvenience, and their property may be lessened in value by the burden of increased taxation, or for any other reason, they have no right, by contract or otherwise, in the unaltered or continued existence of the corporation or its powers, and there is nothing in the Federal Constitution which protects them from these injurious consequences. The power is in the state, and those who legislate for the state are alone responsible for any unjust or oppressive exercise of it."

== See also ==
- Dillon's Rule
