= List of United States Supreme Court cases, volume 207 =

Supreme Court of the United States
- Interactive map of Supreme Court of the United States
- 38°53′26″N 77°00′16″W
- Established: March 4, 1789; 236 years ago
- Location: Washington, D.C.
- Coordinates: 38°53′26″N 77°00′16″W
- Composition method: Presidential nomination with Senate confirmation
- Authorised by: Constitution of the United States, Art. III, § 1
- Judge term length: life tenure, subject to impeachment and removal
- Number of positions: 9 (by statute)
- Website: supremecourt.gov

This is a list of cases reported in volume 207 of United States Reports, decided by the Supreme Court of the United States in 1907 and 1908.

== Justices of the Supreme Court at the time of volume 207 U.S. ==
The Supreme Court is established by Article III, Section 1 of the Constitution of the United States, which says: "The judicial Power of the United States, shall be vested in one supreme Court . . .". The size of the Court is not specified; the Constitution leaves it to Congress to set the number of justices. Under the Judiciary Act of 1789 Congress originally fixed the number of justices at six (one chief justice and five associate justices). Since 1789 Congress has varied the size of the Court from six to seven, nine, ten, and back to nine justices (always including one chief justice).

When the cases in volume 207 were decided the Court comprised the following nine members:

Portrait	Justice	Office	Home State	Succeeded	Date confirmed by the Senate (Vote)	Tenure on Supreme Court
	Melville Fuller	Chief Justice	Illinois	Morrison Waite	July 20, 1888 (41–20)	October 8, 1888 – July 4, 1910 (Died)
	John Marshall Harlan	Associate Justice	Kentucky	David Davis	November 29, 1877 (Acclamation)	December 10, 1877 – October 14, 1911 (Died)
	David Josiah Brewer	Associate Justice	Kansas	Stanley Matthews	December 18, 1889 (53–11)	January 6, 1890 – March 28, 1910 (Died)
	Edward Douglass White	Associate Justice	Louisiana	Samuel Blatchford	February 19, 1894 (Acclamation)	March 12, 1894 – December 18, 1910 (Continued as chief justice)
	Rufus W. Peckham	Associate Justice	New York	Howell Edmunds Jackson	December 9, 1895 (Acclamation)	January 6, 1896 – October 24, 1909 (Died)
	Joseph McKenna	Associate Justice	California	Stephen Johnson Field	January 21, 1898 (Acclamation)	January 26, 1898 – January 5, 1925 (Retired)
	Oliver Wendell Holmes Jr.	Associate Justice	Massachusetts	Horace Gray	December 4, 1902 (Acclamation)	December 8, 1902 – January 12, 1932 (Retired)
	William R. Day	Associate Justice	Ohio	George Shiras Jr.	February 23, 1903 (Acclamation)	March 2, 1903 – November 13, 1922 (Retired)
	William Henry Moody	Associate Justice	Massachusetts	Henry Billings Brown	December 12, 1906 (Acclamation)	December 17, 1906 – November 20, 1910 (Retired)

== Citation style ==
Under the Judiciary Act of 1789 the federal court structure at the time comprised District Courts, which had general trial jurisdiction; Circuit Courts, which had mixed trial and appellate (from the US District Courts) jurisdiction; and the United States Supreme Court, which had appellate jurisdiction over the federal District and Circuit courts—and for certain issues over state courts. The Supreme Court also had limited original jurisdiction (i.e., in which cases could be filed directly with the Supreme Court without first having been heard by a lower federal or state court). There were one or more federal District Courts and/or Circuit Courts in each state, territory, or other geographical region.

The Judiciary Act of 1891 created the United States Courts of Appeals and reassigned the jurisdiction of most routine appeals from the district and circuit courts to these appellate courts. The Act created nine new courts that were originally known as the "United States Circuit Courts of Appeals." The new courts had jurisdiction over most appeals of lower court decisions. The Supreme Court could review either legal issues that a court of appeals certified or decisions of court of appeals by writ of certiorari.

Bluebook citation style is used for case names, citations, and jurisdictions.

- "# Cir." = United States Court of Appeals
  - e.g., "3d Cir." = United States Court of Appeals for the Third Circuit
- "C.C.D." = United States Circuit Court for the District of . . .
  - e.g.,"C.C.D.N.J." = United States Circuit Court for the District of New Jersey
- "D." = United States District Court for the District of . . .
  - e.g.,"D. Mass." = United States District Court for the District of Massachusetts
- "E." = Eastern; "M." = Middle; "N." = Northern; "S." = Southern; "W." = Western
  - e.g.,"C.C.S.D.N.Y." = United States Circuit Court for the Southern District of New York
  - e.g.,"M.D. Ala." = United States District Court for the Middle District of Alabama
- "Ct. Cl." = United States Court of Claims
- The abbreviation of a state's name alone indicates the highest appellate court in that state's judiciary at the time.
  - e.g.,"Pa." = Supreme Court of Pennsylvania
  - e.g.,"Me." = Supreme Judicial Court of Maine

== List of cases in volume 207 U.S. ==
Case Name	Page & year	Opinion of the Court	Concurring opinion(s)	Dissenting opinion(s)	Lower Court	Disposition
Lawson v. United States M. Co.	1 (1907)	Brewer	none	none	8th Cir.	affirmed
Raymond v. Chicago U.T. Co.	20 (1907)	Peckham	none	Holmes	C.C.N.D. Ill.	affirmed
Raymond v. Chicago E. Co.	42 (1907)	Peckham	none	none	C.C.N.D. Ill.	affirmed
Tilt v. Kelsey	43 (1907)	Moody	none	none	N.Y. Cnty. Sur. Ct.	reversed
Ex parte First Nat'l Bank	61 (1907)	Holmes	none	none	7th Cir.	reversed
Lee v. New Jersey	67 (1907)	Day	none	none	N.J.	affirmed
Seaboard et al. R.R. Co. v. Seegers	73 (1907)	Brewer	none	none	S.C.	affirmed
Interstate C.R.R. Co. v. Massachusetts	79 (1907)	Holmes	none	none	Mass. Super. Ct.	affirmed
Chapman v. Bowen	89 (1907)	Fuller	none	none	7th Cir.	dismissed
Leathe v. Thomas	93 (1907)	Holmes	none	none	Ill.	dismissed
Illinois ex rel. McNichols v. Pease	100 (1907)	Harlan	none	none	Ill.	affirmed
Kent v. Porto Rico	113 (1907)	White	none	none	P.R.	dismissed
Taylor v. United States	120 (1907)	Holmes	none	none	2d Cir.	multiple
Central et al. R.R. Co. v. Wright	127 (1907)	Day	none	none	Ga.	reversed
Chambers v. Baltimore & O.R.R. Co.	142 (1907)	Moody	Holmes	Harlan	Ohio	affirmed
Hunter v. City of Pittsburgh	161 (1907)	Moody	none	none	Pa.	affirmed
Webster C. & C. Co. v. Cassatt	181 (1907)	Fuller	none	none	3d Cir.	reversed
Pennsylvania C. & C. Co. v. Cassatt	187 (1907)	Fuller	none	none	3d Cir.	reversed
Shoener v. Pennsylvania	188 (1907)	Harlan	none	none	Pa.	dismissed
Cortelyou v. Johnson & Co.	196 (1907)	Brewer	none	none	2d Cir.	affirmed
Vail v. Arizona	201 (1907)	Brewer	none	none	Sup. Ct. Terr. Ariz.	affirmed
Bitterman v. Louisville & N.R.R. Co.	205 (1907)	White	none	none	5th Cir.	affirmed
United States v. R.P. Andrews & Co.	229 (1907)	White	none	none	Ct. Cl.	affirmed
Earle v. Myers	244 (1907)	Peckham	none	none	D.C. Cir.	reversed
Ozan L. Co. v. Union Cnty. Nat'l Bank	251 (1907)	Peckham	none	none	8th Cir.	reversed
Bank of Ky. v. Kentucky	258 (1907)	McKenna	none	none	Ky.	affirmed
Arkansas S.R.R. Co. v. German Nat'l Bank	270 (1907)	Holmes	none	none	Ark.	dismissed
Patch v. Wabash R.R. Co.	277 (1907)	Holmes	none	none	C.C.S.D. Ill.	reversed
American T. Co. v. Werckmeister	284 (1907)	Day	none	none	2d Cir.	affirmed
Chunn v. City & S.R.R. Co.	302 (1907)	Moody	none	none	D.C. Cir.	reversed
Polk v. Mutual R.F.L. Ass'n	310 (1907)	Moody	none	none	2d Cir.	certification
Atlantic et al. R.R. Co. v. Wharton	328 (1907)	Peckham	none	none	S.C.	reversed
Heath & Milligan Mfg. Co. v. Worst	338 (1907)	McKenna	none	none	C.C.D.N.D.	affirmed
Vandalia R.R. Co. v. Indiana ex rel. City of South Bend	359 (1907)	Brewer	none	none	Ind.	dismissed
Paraiso v. United States	368 (1907)	Holmes	none	none	Phil.	dismissed
Flemister v. United States	372 (1907)	Holmes	none	none	Phil.	affirmed
Werckmeister v. American T. Co.	375 (1907)	Day	none	none	2d Cir.	affirmed
Water, L. & G. Co. v. City of Hutchinson	385 (1907)	McKenna	none	none	C.C.D. Kan.	affirmed
The Hamilton	398 (1907)	Holmes	none	none	2d Cir.	affirmed
Holt v. Murphy	407 (1908)	Brewer	none	none	Sup. Ct. Terr. Okla.	affirmed
Sullivan v. Texas	416 (1908)	Brewer	none	none	Tex. Civ. App.	affirmed
Williamson v. United States	425 (1908)	White	none	none	C.C.D. Or.	reversed
The Employers' Liability Cases	463 (1908)	White	Peckham	Moody; Harlan; Holmes	multiple	affirmed
Consolidated R. Co. v. Vermont	541 (1908)	Peckham	none	none	Vt.	affirmed
Anheuser-Busch B. Ass'n v. United States	556 (1908)	McKenna	none	none	Ct. Cl.	affirmed
Winters v. United States	564 (1908)	McKenna	none	none	9th Cir.	affirmed

== See also ==
- Certificate of division
