= Pullman Palace Car Co. v. Speck =

- Supreme Court of the United States

Submitted December 18, 1884 Decided January 5, 1885
- Full case name: Pullman Palace Car Co. & Others v. Speck & Others
- Citations: 113 U.S. 84 (more) 5 S. Ct. 374; 28 L. Ed. 925

Court membership
- Chief Justice Morrison Waite Associate Justices Samuel F. Miller · Stephen J. Field; Joseph P. Bradley · John M. Harlan; William B. Woods · Stanley Matthews; Horace Gray · Samuel Blatchford

Case opinion
- Majority: Miller, joined by unanimous

Pullman Palace Car Co. v. Speck, 113 U.S. 84 (1885), was an appeals case from the circuit court for the Northern district of Illinois a case that had been removed from that court. The appeal was on the grounds that while a party who has a case for removal is not put to his election to exercise or abandon the right to remove at the moment of entering his appearance, he is not permitted unreasonably to delay this election during all the period incident to the preparation of the case, until both parties find themselves in condition to go to trial at law.

Whether they be statutory or rules of the court's adoption, the cause would stand for trial if the parties had taken the usual steps as to pleading and other preparations. This term at which the case could be first tried is to be ascertained by these rules, and not by the manner in which the parties have complied with them, or have been excused for non- compliance by the court, or by stipulation among themselves.

It appears by a stipulation in the case that the first Monday in every month is the beginning of a new term of the Superior Court of Cook County, from which this suit was removed. It also appears that the suit was brought to the September term, 1883, of that court, and the defendants, who were the removing party, and are also appellants here, obtained an extension of time, by order of the court, for 30 days from September 20, to answer the original bill, and like time was granted to the defendants in a cross-bill to answer that. This time was extended afterwards in both cases, by agreement of counsel, until January 11, 1884, and on that day they were filed. The application for this removal was made in the February term, 1884.

It thus appears that, including the appearance term at which the case might have been tried if appellant had answered according to rule, instead of obtaining an extension of 30 days by order of the court, there were five terms of the court at which the motion could have been made for removal in which no such motion was made. We see no reason why this case was not triable at any of those terms according to the due course of proceedings in such cases. The only reason why it was not so tried, was the time beyond that of the usual course prescribed by rule, which was obtained by order of the court or by agreement of the parties. The case was certainly triable at the January term, after the answers were all in, for it could have been then tried on bill and answer, or the plaintiff have been forced to file replication, which could have been done instanter. The decree of the circuit court remanding the case to the state court is affirmed.

== See also ==
- Railroad Commission v. Pullman Co.
- List of United States Supreme Court cases, volume 113
