= England v. Louisiana State Board of Medical Examiners =

- Supreme Court of the United States

Argued October 15, 1963 Decided January 13, 1964
- Full case name: England, et al. v. Louisiana State Board of Medical Examiners, et al.
- Citations: 375 U.S. 411 (more) 84 S. Ct. 461; 11 L. Ed. 2d 440; 1964 U.S. LEXIS 2264

Case history
- Prior: Appeal from the United States District Court for the Eastern District of Louisiana. England v. Louisiana State Board of Medical Examiners, 194 F. Supp. 521, 1961 U.S. Dist. LEXIS 3270 (E.D. La. 1961)

Holding
- The Court refined the procedures for U.S. federal courts to abstain from deciding issues of state law, pursuant to the doctrine set forth in Railroad Commission v. Pullman Co., 312 U.S. 496 (1941).

Court membership
- Chief Justice Earl Warren Associate Justices Hugo Black · William O. Douglas; Tom C. Clark · John M. Harlan II; William J. Brennan Jr. · Potter Stewart; Byron White · Arthur Goldberg

Case opinions
- Majority: Brennan, joined by Warren, Clark, Harlan, Stewart, White, Goldberg
- Concurrence: Douglas
- Concur/dissent: Black

Laws applied
- U.S. Const.

England v. Louisiana State Board of Medical Examiners, 375 U.S. 411 (1964), was a United States Supreme Court decision that refined the procedures for U.S. federal courts to abstain from deciding issues of state law, pursuant to the doctrine set forth in Railroad Commission v. Pullman Co., 312 U.S. 496 (1941).

== Background ==
The plaintiffs were chiropractors in the state of Louisiana. They sued in the United States District Court to prevent state officials from applying a licensing scheme to them, arguing both that they were not within the group to whom the statute applied, and that the statute infringed the Fourteenth Amendment to the United States Constitution. The District Court noted that a state court might find that the state law did not apply to the plaintiffs, and abstained from hearing the case pursuant to the Pullman abstention doctrine.

The plaintiffs noted that a case refining Pullman called Government and Civil Employees Organizing Committee, CIO v. Windsor, 353 U.S. 364 (1957) had held that the judgment of the state court was meaningless unless the state court was aware that constitutional questions had also been raised as to the validity of the statute. The plaintiffs therefore brought both claims in the Louisiana state court (as they believed Pullman and Windsor required). The state court found against them on both statutory and constitutional claims.

The plaintiffs then returned to the District Court seeking a new hearing on the constitutional question. The defendant then sought a dismissal on res judicata grounds, contending that the decision of the state court was binding as to the constitutional issue.

== Result ==
The Supreme Court, in an opinion by Justice Brennan, noted that the state court determination would indeed bind the federal court. The proper procedure, the Court determined, is to give notice that the federal issue is contended, but to expressly reserve the claim on the federal issue for the federal court. If such a reservation is made, the parties can return to the federal court, even if the state court makes a ruling on the issue.

However, the Court also noted that even if the parties did not expressly reserve the federal issues, they can still return to the federal court if it is apparent that the parties had avoided adjudication of the federal law issues.

Because the plaintiffs in this case believed that they were just following the law as required, they would not be barred from continuing in the federal court.

== See also ==
- List of United States Supreme Court cases, volume 375
