= List of United States Supreme Court cases, volume 375 =

This is a list of all the United States Supreme Court cases from volume 375 of the United States Reports:

Case name	Citation	Date decided
Daegele v. Kansas	375 U.S. 1	1963
Pickelsimer v. Wainwright	375 U.S. 2	1963
Lemmon v. Robertson	375 U.S. 5	1963
Averitt v. Mississippi	375 U.S. 5	1963
Henry v. Rock Hill	375 U.S. 6	1963
Rapoport v. Ohio	375 U.S. 6	1963
Ryan v. President of Senate	375 U.S. 7	1963
Williams v. City of Wichita	375 U.S. 7	1963
Trunkline Gas Co. v. Hardin Cnty.	375 U.S. 8	1963
Kaukas v. City of Chicago	375 U.S. 8	1963
Sayles Finishing Plants, Inc. v. Toomey	375 U.S. 9	1963
Brewer v. North Carolina	375 U.S. 9	1963
Friedman v. Court on Judiciary	375 U.S. 10	1963
Louisiana ex rel. Schwegmann Bank & Tr. Co. v. Jeansonne	375 U.S. 10	1963
Miller v. City of Chicago	375 U.S. 11	1963
Butler v. Dunbar	375 U.S. 11	1963
Roadway Express, Inc. v. United States	375 U.S. 12	1963
Matson v. Queen's Hosp.	375 U.S. 12	1963
Higbee v. Thomas	375 U.S. 13	1963
Gray v. Pennsylvania	375 U.S. 13	1963
In re Jenison	375 U.S. 14	1963
Johnson v. Wilkins	375 U.S. 14	1963
State Corp. Comm'n v. United States	375 U.S. 15	1963
Salas v. Texas	375 U.S. 15	1963
Reatz v. New York	375 U.S. 16	1963
Cepero v. Peloso	375 U.S. 16	1963
King v. King	375 U.S. 17	1963
Ryan v. Tinsley	375 U.S. 17	1963
Trainmen v. Chicago & Ill. Midland R.R. Co.	375 U.S. 18	1963
Wabaningo Boy Scout Camp v. Michigan Tax Comm'n	375 U.S. 19	1963
Scarnato v. LaVallee	375 U.S. 20	1963
Newsome v. North Carolina	375 U.S. 21	1963
Shockey v. Illinois	375 U.S. 22	1963
Cooper v. Alabama	375 U.S. 23	1963
Ausbie v. California	375 U.S. 24	1963
Nicholson v. Boles	375 U.S. 25	1963
Herrera v. Heinze	375 U.S. 26	1963
Tabb v. California	375 U.S. 27	1963
Barnes v. North Carolina	375 U.S. 28	1963
Panico v. United States	375 U.S. 29	1963
Evola v. United States	375 U.S. 32	1963
Tipton v. Socony Mobil Oil Co.	375 U.S. 34	1963
Shenandoah Valley Broad., Inc. v. ASCAP	375 U.S. 39	1963
Dunlap v. Ohio	375 U.S. 42	1963
Stover v. New York	375 U.S. 42	1963
Humble Oil & Refining Co. v. Male	375 U.S. 43	1963
Davis v. City of Bowling Green	375 U.S. 43	1963
Fields v. South Carolina	375 U.S. 44	1963
Cade v. Louisiana	375 U.S. 44	1963
Hess v. Kriz	375 U.S. 45	1963
Luomala v. Shore	375 U.S. 45	1963
Jacobs v. Arizona	375 U.S. 46	1963
Chodorov v. New York	375 U.S. 46	1963
Simmons v. Oswald	375 U.S. 47	1963
Thompson v. Missouri	375 U.S. 47	1963
Aristeguieta v. First Nat'l Bank	375 U.S. 48	1963
Aristeguieta v. First Nat'l Bank	375 U.S. 49	1963
Crews v. Wainwright	375 U.S. 50	1963
Banks v. Wainwright	375 U.S. 51	1963
Bartone v. United States	375 U.S. 52	1963
South Coast Fisheries, Inc. v. Department of Fish and Game	375 U.S. 57	1963
Orkin Exterminating Co. v. Gulf Coast Rice Mills	375 U.S. 57	1963
Canton Co. v. Comptroller of Treasury	375 U.S. 58	1963
United States v. Zacks	375 U.S. 59	1963
Parsons v. Chesapeake & Ohio R.R. Co.	375 U.S. 71	1963
Aldrich v. Aldrich	375 U.S. 75	1963
Barker v. Metropolitan Life Ins. Co.	375 U.S. 77	1963
Mississippi Power & Light Co. v. Capital Elec. Power Ass'n	375 U.S. 77	1963
Courtesy Sandwich Shop, Inc. v. Port of N.Y. Auth.	375 U.S. 78	1963
Gotthilf v. Sills	375 U.S. 79	1963
Certified Credit Corp. v. Bowers	375 U.S. 84	1963
Fahy v. Connecticut	375 U.S. 85	1963
Retail Clerks v. Schermerhorn (Schermerhorn II)	375 U.S. 96	1963
Durfee v. Duke	375 U.S. 106	1963
United States v. Stapf	375 U.S. 118	1963
Dresner v. City of Tallahassee	375 U.S. 136	1963
Chicago & E. Ill. R. Co. v. United States	375 U.S. 150	1963
Meeker v. Ambassador Oil Corp.	375 U.S. 160	1963
Berry v. New York	375 U.S. 160	1963
Kirkland v. Texas	375 U.S. 161	1963
Abernathy v. Eastern Air Lines, Inc.	375 U.S. 161	1963
United States v. Behrens	375 U.S. 162	1963
Corey v. United States	375 U.S. 169	1963
SEC v. Capital Gains Research Bureau, Inc.	375 U.S. 180	1963
Dennis v. Denver & R.G.W.R.R. Co.	375 U.S. 208	1963
Kaye v. Spence Chapin Adoption Home	375 U.S. 214	1963
Eckstrom v. Reading Police Home Ass'n	375 U.S. 214	1963
Frank Adams & Co. v. United States	375 U.S. 215	1963
Maintenance Employes v. United States	375 U.S. 216	1963
Foti v. INS	375 U.S. 217	1963
Meyer v. United States	375 U.S. 233	1963
Fields v. Fairfield	375 U.S. 248	1963
Aldrich v. Aldrich	375 U.S. 249	1963
Eichel v. New York C.R.R. Co.	375 U.S. 253	1963
Fair Drain Taxation, Inc. v. City of St. Clair Shores	375 U.S. 258	1963
Macon v. Indiana	375 U.S. 258	1963
Smith v. California (1963)	375 U.S. 259	1963
McAllister v. Louisiana	375 U.S. 260	1963
Carey v. Westinghouse Elec. Corp.	375 U.S. 261	1964
Hardy v. United States	375 U.S. 277	1964
Liner v. Jafco, Inc.	375 U.S. 301	1964
National Equipment Rental, Ltd. v. Szukhent	375 U.S. 311	1964
Humphrey v. Moore	375 U.S. 335	1964
Polar Ice Cream & Creamery Co. v. Andrews	375 U.S. 361	1964
Thompson v. INS	375 U.S. 384	1964
Griffin v. School Bd.	375 U.S. 391	1964
Wintner v. United States	375 U.S. 393	1964
Walker v. Louisiana ex rel. Joint Legislative Comm'n on Un-American Activities	375 U.S. 393	1964
Ratigan v. Davis	375 U.S. 394	1964
Spatt v. City of New York	375 U.S. 394	1964
Consul Gen. of Yugoslavia v. Pennsylvania	375 U.S. 395	1964
Schiro v. Bynum	375 U.S. 395	1964
Hansell v. Douglass	375 U.S. 396	1964
NLRB v. Mine Workers	375 U.S. 396	1964
Faudel v. Iowa	375 U.S. 397	1964
Watkins v. Beto	375 U.S. 397	1964
Jennings v. Texas	375 U.S. 398	1964
Anderson v. Martin	375 U.S. 399	1964
NLRB v. Exchange Parts Co.	375 U.S. 405	1964
England v. Louisiana Bd. of Med. Examiners	375 U.S. 411	1964
Brazosport Sav. & Loan Assn. v. Phillips	375 U.S. 438	1964
Stickler v. Ohio	375 U.S. 438	1964
Blaikie v. Power	375 U.S. 439	1964
Pennington v. City of Corpus Christi	375 U.S. 439	1964
Reisman v. Caplin	375 U.S. 440	1964
Lanza v. New Jersey	375 U.S. 451	1964
Aronoff v. Franchise Tax Bd.	375 U.S. 451	1964
Arrow Carrier Corp. v. United States	375 U.S. 452	1964
