= Werckmeister v. American Tobacco Co. =

- Supreme Court of the United States

Argued October 30, 1907 Decided December 16, 1907
- Full case name: Werckmeister v. American Tobacco Co.
- Citations: 207 U.S. 375 (more) 28 S. Ct. 124; 52 L. Ed. 254

Holding
- A copyright holder is limited to one action to collect infringing copies and statutory damages because the act's remedies are penal and must be observed without construction. The United States is not required to be a party to copyright infringement litigation.

Court membership
- Chief Justice Melville Fuller Associate Justices John M. Harlan · David J. Brewer; Edward D. White · Rufus W. Peckham; Joseph McKenna · Oliver W. Holmes Jr. William R. Day · William H. Moody

Case opinion
- Majority: Day, joined by a unanimous court

Laws applied
- Copyright Act of 1870, amendment in 1895

Werckmeister v. American Tobacco Co., 207 U.S. 375 (1907), was a United States Supreme Court case in which the Court held a copyright holder is limited to one action to collect infringing copies and statutory damages because the act's remedies are penal and must be observed without construction. Additionally, the United States is not required to be a party to copyright infringement litigation.

The Copyright Act of 1870 does not specify what sort of action a litigant must bring to remedy copyright infringement. Werckmeister won an infringement claim against American Tobacco Company and United States Marshalls collected the infringing copies from the company. Werckmeister took American Tobacco Company back to court to get the monetary damages enumerated by the Copyright Act. In the United States, a successful penal (criminal) suit may collect property and money as restitution. Because the Court determined that the infringement damages were penal, Werckmeister had the opportunity to collect the property, as they did, and the money. They were thus limited to only one action to collect both property and money, because the statute only provided for one action.
