= National Equipment Rental, Ltd. v. Szukhent =

- Supreme Court of the United States

Argued November 20, 1963 Decided January 6, 1964
- Full case name: National Equipment Rental, Ltd. v. Szukhent
- Citations: 375 U.S. 311 (more) 84 S. Ct. 411; 11 L. Ed. 2d 354; 1964 U.S. LEXIS 2032

Case history
- Prior: 311 F.2d 79 (2d Cir. 1962)

Holding
- Service of process upon a party's designated agent does not invalidate personal jurisdiction that would otherwise be established, if the agent gives prompt notice to the party.

Court membership
- Chief Justice Earl Warren Associate Justices Hugo Black · William O. Douglas; Tom C. Clark · John M. Harlan II; William J. Brennan Jr. · Potter Stewart; Byron White · Arthur Goldberg

Case opinions
- Majority: Stewart
- Dissent: Black
- Dissent: Brennan, joined by Warren, Goldberg

National Equipment Rental, Ltd. v. Szukhent, 375 U.S. 311 (1964), was a case in which the Supreme Court of the United States held that service of process upon a party's designated agent does not invalidate personal jurisdiction that would otherwise be established, if the agent gives prompt notice to the party.

== Background ==
Defendants Szukhents, farmers in Michigan, entered into a contractual relationship with plaintiff National Equipment Rental, a New York-based company, for the leasing of farm equipment. This contract, written by National Equipment Rental, included a term designating Florence Weinberg, at a New York address, as agent for service of process regarding the contract. The Szukhents had never met Ms. Weinberg. In suing the Szukhents in the United States District Court for the Eastern District of New York, National Equipment Rental served process upon Ms. Weinberg, who then notified the Szukhents of the suit via mail. Subject-matter jurisdiction was founded upon diversity of citizenship. The Szukhents challenged personal jurisdiction on the grounds that there was no constitutional basis for personal jurisdiction.

== Opinion of the Court ==
The Supreme Court upheld the ability of parties to a contract to agree in advance to the jurisdiction of a particular court. The Court then proceeded to consider the validity of the agency relationship between Ms. Weinberg and the Szukhents, and found that since Ms. Weinberg appropriately notified the Szukhents, the agency was valid under relevant laws, and therefore the service upon Ms. Weinberg was effective service upon the Szukhents.

With effective service, the Court held that personal jurisdiction over the Szukhents had been established in the District Court, pursuant to the then-effective Federal Rule of Civil Procedure 4(d)(1).

Justice Black dissented, and would have found the agency relationship invalid by applying of New York state appellate court precedent, thus affirming the District Court's quashing of service. Alternatively, if defining agency law for the purposes of the Federal Rules of Civil Procedure, Justice Black would not include the relationship in question in such a definition. Finally, Justice Black questioned whether the Szukhents had received due process under the Fifth and Fourteenth Amendments, which form parts of the basis for Constitutional personal jurisdiction jurisprudence.

Justice Brennan, with whom the Chief Justice and Justice Goldberg joined, agreed with Justice Black's second contention, and would have held that 4(d)(1) requires a Federal standard for agency, and that the relationship with Ms. Weinberg would not meet such requirements.

== See also ==
- Law of agency
- List of United States Supreme Court cases
- Lists of United States Supreme Court cases by volume
- List of United States Supreme Court cases by the Warren Court
