= Parallel litigation =

Scenario where different courts hear the same claims

Parallel litigation is a scenario in which different courts are hearing the same claim(s). In the United States, parallel litigation (and the "race to judgement" that results) is a consequence of its system of "dual sovereignty, in which both state and federal courts have personal jurisdiction over the parties. A major exception to this rule is that a second parallel in rem proceeding will be enjoined by the first court to obtain jurisdiction, as it has already been drawn into constructive possession of the object of the dispute.

In rare cases the federal courts have announced a policy of not hearing (abstaining from) a case when there is parallel litigation going on in state courts, following the Colorado River abstention doctrine. In that case, the federal government sued for adjudication of certain water rights in Colorado; parties to a state court proceeding joined the U.S. as a defendant, and the Supreme Court said the federal courts should defer to that parallel litigation. This analysis can be conceptualized as a forum non conveniens analysis in which there is already an alternative forum in play.

The general rule is that "[a]bstention from the exercise of federal jurisdiction is the exception, not the rule."

== See also ==
- Multiplicity of suits
