= Younger v. Harris =

- Supreme Court of the United States

Argued April 1, 1969 Reargued April 29, 1970 Reargued November 16, 1970 Decided February 23, 1971
- Full case name: Evelle J. Younger, District Attorney of Los Angeles County v. John Harris, Jr., Jim Dan, Diane Hirsch, and Farrel Broslawsky
- Citations: 401 U.S. 37 (more) 91 S. Ct. 746; 27 L. Ed. 2d 669; 1971 U.S. LEXIS 136

Case history
- Prior: Judgment for plaintiffs, 281 F. Supp. 507 (C.D. Cal. 1968); probable jurisdiction noted, 393 U.S. 1013 (1969).

Holding
- The possible unconstitutionality of a state statute is not grounds for a federal court to enjoin state court criminal proceedings brought pursuant to that statute. District Court for the Central District of California reversed and remanded.

Court membership
- Chief Justice Warren E. Burger Associate Justices Hugo Black · William O. Douglas; John M. Harlan II · William J. Brennan Jr. Potter Stewart · Byron White; Thurgood Marshall · Harry Blackmun

Case opinions
- Majority: Black, joined by Burger, Harlan, Stewart, Blackmun
- Concurrence: Stewart, joined by Harlan
- Concurrence: Brennan, joined by White, Marshall
- Dissent: Douglas

Laws applied
- 28 U.S.C. § 2283

Younger v. Harris, 401 U.S. 37 (1971), was a case in which the United States Supreme Court held that United States federal courts were required to abstain from hearing any civil rights tort claims brought by a person who is currently being prosecuted for the underlying matters giving rise to those claims. The case is the namesake of Younger abstention.

== Facts ==
In 1966, several months after the Watts riots and in response to the killing of Leonard Deadwiler (a Black man shot by police while driving his pregnant wife to the hospital), John Harris, Jr., was arrested while handing out leaflets which said, among other things, "Wanted for the murder of Leonard Deadwiler, Bobo the cop."

Harris, a member of the Progressive Labor Party, was indicted on two violations of the California Criminal Syndicalism Act, §§11400 and 11401. These statutes prohibited advocating "unlawful acts of force or violence [to] effect political change." Harris faced 14 years on each count.

While prosecution was pending, Harris sued under 42 U.S.C. § 1983 to get an injunction preventing District Attorney Evelle J. Younger from enforcing the law on the grounds that it violated the free speech guarantee. He was joined in this action by Jim Dan and Diane Hirsch, members of the PLP, and Farrel Broslawsky, a history instructor. In Harris v. Younger, 281 F. Supp. 507 (C.D. Cal. 1968), the district court found the Act unconstitutional, enjoining the state from further prosecution of Harris. Younger appealed.

== Decision and precedent ==
In an 8–1 decision, the Court held that federal courts may not hear the case until the person is convicted or found not guilty of the crime unless the defendant will suffer an irreparable injury that is "both great and immediate." Merely having to endure a criminal prosecution is no such irreparable harm.

There are three exceptions to Younger abstention:

1. Where the prosecution is in bad faith (i.e. the state knows the person to be innocent)—as applied in Dombrowski v. Pfister; or
2. Where the prosecution is part of some pattern of harassment against an individual; or
3. Where the law being enforced is utterly and irredeemably unconstitutional (e.g., if the state were to pass a law making it a crime to say anything negative about its governor under any circumstances).

== Dissent ==
In dissent, Justice Douglas noted,

If the ‘advocacy’ which Harris used was an attempt at persuasion through the use of bullets, bombs, and arson, we would have a different case. But Harris is charged only with distributing leaflets advocating political action toward his objective...

The eternal temptation, of course, has been to arrest the speaker rather than to correct the conditions about which he complains. I see no reason why these appellees should be made to walk the treacherous ground of these statutes. They, like other citizens, need the umbrella of the First Amendment as they study, analyze, discuss, and debate the troubles of these days. When criminal prosecutions can be leveled against them because they express unpopular views, the society of the dialogue is in danger.

== Status as precedent ==
The doctrine was later extended to situations where the state is seeking to execute a civil fine against someone, or has jailed a person for contempt of court. The doctrine applies even where the state does not bring an action until after the person has filed a lawsuit in federal court, provided that the federal court has not yet taken any action on the suit. Moreover, the principle of abstention applies to some state administrative proceedings.

In regard to the exceptions which the Younger Court articulated, later decisions make it clear that these are highly difficult to meet.

1. Bad faith prosecution: in no case since Younger was decided has the Supreme Court found there to exist bad faith prosecution sufficient to justify a federal court injunction against state court proceedings. The Court has specifically declined to find bad faith prosecution even in circumstances where repeated prosecutions had occurred. As commentator Erwin Chemerinsky states, the bad-faith prosecution exception seems narrowly limited to facts like those in Dombrowski. Other scholars have even asserted that the possible range of cases which would fit the Dombrowski model and allow an exception to the no-injunction rule is so limited as to be an "empty universe."
2. Patently unconstitutional law: in no case since Younger was decided has the Supreme court found there to exist a patently unconstitutional law sufficient to justify a federal court injunction against state court proceedings. The Court has specifically declined to find such patent unconstitutionality in at least one case (Trainor v. Hernandez)
3. Inadequate state forum: the Supreme Court has found the state forum in question to be inadequate on a small number of occasions.

== See also ==
- Abstention doctrine
- Anti-Injunction Act (1793)
