= McCarran Amendment =

The McCarran Amendment, 43 U.S.C. § 666 (1952) is a federal law enacted by the United States Congress in 1952 which waives the United States' sovereign immunity in suits concerning ownership or management of water rights. It amended Chapter 15 (Appropriation of Waters; Reservoir Sites) of Title 43 (Public Lands) of the United States Code. The McCarran Amendment gives others the right to join in such a lawsuit as a defendant. Prior to the Amendment, sovereign immunity kept the United States from being joined in any suits. The Amendment enabled suits concerning federal water rights to be tried in state courts.

== Text ==
(a) Joinder of United States as defendant; costs

Consent is given to join the United States as a defendant in any suit (1) for the adjudication of rights to the use of water of a river system or other source, or (2) for the administration of such rights, where it appears that the United States is the owner of or is in the process of acquiring water rights by appropriation under State law, by purchase, by exchange, or otherwise, and the United States is a necessary party to such suit. The United States, when a party to any such suit, shall (1) be deemed to have waived any right to plead that the State laws are inapplicable or that the United States is not amenable thereto by reason of its sovereignty, and (2) shall be subject to the judgments, orders, and decrees of the court having jurisdiction, and may obtain review thereof, in the same manner and to the same extent as a private individual under like circumstances: Provided, That no judgment for costs shall be entered against the United States in any such suit.

(b) Service of summons

Summons or other process in any such suit shall be served upon the Attorney General or his designated representative.

(c) Joinder in suits involving use of interstate streams by State

Nothing in this section shall be construed as authorizing the joinder of the United States in any suit or controversy in the Supreme Court of the United States involving the right of States to the use of the water of any interstate stream.

== Background ==
While the original amendment specified that state courts only held concurrent jurisdiction in state and federal district courts in water rights adjudication cases under The McCarran Amendment, the case Colorado River Water Conservation District v. United States, 424 U.S. 800 (1976) specified that all water rights adjudication cases must originate in state court, though they can be appealed later to federal courts.

Many Indian legal scholars hoped the McCarran Amendment would not require origination in state courts in the Western states that joined the union late and were held under a "disclaimer clause", however the Supreme Court found that the Colorado River Water Conservation District case applied to all states in the 1985 Arizona v. San Carlos Apache Tribe case.

This case had an extraordinary effect on the adjudication of Indian reserved water rights, though some legal scholars argue that it was never intended to apply to Indian reservations. Elizabeth McCallister argued in 1976 American Indian Law Review article that legislative history shows proponents of the bill were more concerned with adjudication of individual water rights against the United States, rather than claims against Indian reservations. In fact, the acting secretary of the Interior at the time argued such a law should only be enacted if it explicitly excluded Indian reservations.

As a result of the McCarran Amendment and subsequent test cases, many Indian tribes have opted to quantify reserved water rights through negotiations rather than outright adjudication, as water rights adjudication in state court has often held poor results for tribes, and has proven very costly.
