= Federal jurisdiction =

Federal jurisdiction is the jurisdiction of the federal government in any country that uses federalism. Such a country is known as a Federation.

== Federal jurisdiction by country ==
All federations, by definition, must have some form of federal jurisdiction, this will commonly include powers relating to international relations and war. Though power for particular actions varies from one federation to another.

- Federal jurisdiction (Canada)
- Federal jurisdiction (United States)
- Federal jurisdiction (Iraq)

== See also ==
- Federation
