= Burford v. Sun Oil Co. =

- Supreme Court of the United States

Argued February 8–9, 1943 Reargued April 14–15, 1943 Decided May 24, 1943
- Full case name: Burford, et al. v. Sun Oil Company, et al.
- Citations: 319 U.S. 315 (more) 63 S. Ct. 1098; 87 L. Ed. 1424; 1943 U.S. LEXIS 1103

Case history
- Prior: Certiorari to the Circuit Court of Appeals for the Fifth Circuit

Holding
- A federal court sitting in diversity jurisdiction may abstain from hearing a case where the state courts likely have greater expertise in a particularly complex and unclear area of state law which is of special significance to the state, where there is comprehensive state administrative/regulatory procedure, and where the federal issues cannot be decided without delving into state law.

Court membership
- Chief Justice Harlan F. Stone Associate Justices Owen Roberts · Hugo Black; Stanley F. Reed · Felix Frankfurter; William O. Douglas · Frank Murphy; Robert H. Jackson · Wiley B. Rutledge

Case opinions
- Plurality: Black, joined by Jackson, Rutledge
- Concurrence: Douglas, joined by Murphy
- Dissent: Frankfurter, joined by Stone, Roberts, Reed

Laws applied
- U.S. Const.

Burford v. Sun Oil Co., 319 U.S. 315 (1943), was a United States Supreme Court case in which the Court created a new doctrine of abstention.

== Facts ==
The Railroad Commission of Texas granted defendant Burford an order which gave him a right to drill four oil wells on a small plot of land on the East Texas Oil Field. Plaintiff Sun Oil Co. sued Burford in United States District Court for the Western District of Texas, asserting both federal question jurisdiction and diversity jurisdiction, and alleging that the commission's order denied them Due Process of law under the Fourteenth Amendment.

The commission was charged by Texas state law with the administration of oil and gas regulations, including production quotas for each field and well. Quotas were set in conjunction with other oil- and gas-producing states. Part of its duties was regulating the spacing of the individual oil wells. Because of the complex geology of oil fields and multiple division of surface rights, one user's oil drilling activity can affect the production of others, which meant that both public and private interests were at stake. Underground water and gas pressure needed to be monitored in order to maintain steady oil production and prevent waste.

Because the rule governing the spacing of wells over the oil field, known as "Rule 37", generated a large amount of litigation among many competing landowners and potential drillers, the Texas Legislature had developed a special system of judicial review for such cases. Commission orders could be appealed to the state district court in Travis County, Texas, and could then be reviewed by the Texas Court of Civil Appeals, and then to the Texas Supreme Court, which had final authority over questions of state law.

The district court of Travis County was given exclusive jurisdiction over appeals of Commission orders, allowing them to specialize in such matters and promoting cooperation between the court and the commission. There already existed conflicting statutory interpretations between the state and federal courts in this matter, so the district court chose to abstain in deference to the state and dismiss the case. The United States Court of Appeals for the Fifth Circuit reversed the District Court's dismissal.

== Plurality opinion ==
Justice Black, writing for the plurality, reversed the judgment of the Fifth Circuit and upheld the District Court's dismissal of the matter. The central issue to the plaintiff's claim was the "reasonableness" of the commission's order according to state law, which Black agreed was a different standard than constitutional due process. Black compared the situation in this case to that in Railroad Commission v. Pullman Co., arguing that this was a matter of interpretation of state law which needed to be handled authoritatively by the state court system, and that state court review was adequate, especially in light of the fact that questions of federal law could still be reviewed by the U.S. Supreme Court via writ of certiorari from the Texas Supreme Court.

=== Holding ===
Under the doctrine of Burford abstention, a federal court sitting in diversity jurisdiction may abstain from hearing the case where the state courts likely have greater expertise in a particularly complex and a unique area of state law which is of special significance to the state, where there is comprehensive state administrative/regulatory procedure, and where the federal issues cannot be decided without delving into state law.

== Concurrence ==
Justice Douglas, concurring, implied that the Court's ruling did not go far enough. He noted that

the opinion of the Court as I read it does not hold or even fairly imply that 'the enforcement of state rights created by state legislation and affecting state policies is limited to the state courts.' Any such holding would result in a drastic inroad on diversity jurisdiction-a limitation which I agree might be desirable but which Congress, not this Court, should make. The holding in these cases, however, goes to no such length.

319 U.S. at 335.

Here, he is essentially criticizing the reach of the federal courts' diversity jurisdiction into matters of state law. He pointed out that even though the Court's opinion views the Commission and the Texas court system "working partners" in administering the law, the courts are in reality sitting in judgment of the commission's decisions. This is a role which a U.S. District Court would be unwise to play, for it would interfere with the State's administration of its own laws and create serious issues of federalism and create conflicting legal precedent.

== Dissent ==
Justice Frankfurter dissented, defending the concept of diversity jurisdiction as a method of providing an impartial forum for disputes between parties from different states, and criticizing the majority for denying the parties their day in federal court. He noted that the question of whether to limit or abolish diversity jurisdiction is a question for Congress, and not the courts. He distinguished Railroad Commission v. Pullman Co. on the grounds that in that case, the state law question could have displaced the federal issue entirely, and that the Texas Supreme Court had already defined the terms of the statute and the scope of judicial review thereunder.

== See also ==
- List of United States Supreme Court cases, volume 319
