= Abstention doctrine =

Doctrine prevalent in the American judiciary

An abstention doctrine is any of several doctrines that a United States court may (or in some cases must) apply to refuse to hear a case if hearing the case would potentially intrude upon the powers of another court. Such doctrines are usually invoked where lawsuits involving the same issues are brought in two different court systems at the same time (such as federal and state courts).

The United States has a federal court system with limitations on the cases that it can hear, while each state has its own individual court system. In some instances, the jurisdiction of these courts overlap, so a lawsuit between two parties may be brought in either or both courts. The latter circumstance can lead to confusion, waste resources, as well as cause the appearance that one court is disrespecting the other. Both federal and state courts have developed rules determining when one court will defer to another's jurisdiction over a particular case.

== Federal abstention doctrines ==
The various abstention doctrines applied by federal courts are named for the United States Supreme Court cases in which they were enunciated.

=== Pullman abstention ===
Pullman abstention was the first "doctrine of abstention" to be announced by the Court, and is named for Railroad Commission v. Pullman Co., 312 U.S. 496 (1941). The doctrine holds that "the federal courts should not adjudicate the constitutionality of state enactments fairly open to interpretation until the state courts have been afforded a reasonable opportunity to pass on them." This doctrine permits a federal court to stay a plaintiff's claim that a state law violates the United States Constitution until the state's judiciary has had an opportunity to apply the law to the plaintiff's particular case. The hope is to avoid a federal constitutional ruling by allowing the state courts to construe the law in a way that eliminates the constitutional problem or to rule it void under the state's own constitution.

For Pullman abstention to be invoked, three conditions must be apparent:

1. The case presents both state grounds and federal constitutional grounds for relief;
2. The proper resolution of the state ground for the decision is unclear; and
3. The disposition of the state ground could obviate adjudication of the federal constitutional ground.

Under Pullman abstention, the federal court retains jurisdiction to hear the constitutional issues in the case if the state court's resolution is still constitutionally suspect. In Government and Civil Employees Organizing Committee, CIO v. Windsor, 353 U.S. 364 (1957), the Supreme Court held that litigants must inform the state court that they are contending that the state law violates a federal constitutional provision, so that the state court may take that into consideration when interpreting the state statute. However, in England v. Louisiana State Board of Medical Examiners, 375 U.S. 411 (1964), the Supreme Court noted that the litigants must not ask the state court to resolve the constitutional issue itself, or the federal court would be bound by res judicata to follow the decision of the state court. In such a case, the litigant seeking a judgment that the law is unconstitutional must usually appeal to the higher courts of the state, rather than seeking review in a federal court.

=== Younger abstention ===
Younger abstention, named for Younger v. Harris, 401 U.S. 37 (1971), is less permissive to the federal courts, barring them from hearing civil rights tort claims brought by a person who is currently being prosecuted for a matter arising from that claim in state court. For example, if an individual who was charged with drug possession under a state law believes that the search was illegal, and in violation of their Fourth Amendment rights, that person may have a cause of action to sue the state for illegally searching him. However, a federal court will not hear the case until the criminal case is adjudicated favorably for the criminal defendant. The doctrine has been extended to state civil proceedings in aid of and closely related to state criminal statutes, administrative proceedings initiated by a state agency, or situations where the State has jailed a person for contempt of court. The doctrine applies even where the state does not bring an action until after the person has filed a lawsuit in federal court, provided that the federal court has not yet undergone proceedings of substance on the merits of the federal suit.

There are three exceptions to Younger abstention:

1. Where the prosecution is in bad faith (i.e. the state knows the person to be innocent); or
2. Where the prosecution is part of some pattern of harassment against an individual; or
3. Where the law being enforced is flagrantly and patently unconstitutional (e.g., if the state were to pass a law making it a crime to say anything negative about its governor under any circumstances).

=== Burford abstention and Thibodaux abstention ===
Burford abstention, derived from Burford v. Sun Oil Co., 319 U.S. 315 (1943), allows a federal court to abstain in complex administrative processes (the case itself dealt with the regulation of oil drilling operations in Texas). Burford allows a federal court to dismiss a case only if:

1. The case presents "difficult questions of state law bearing on policy problems of substantial public import whose importance transcends the result in the case then at bar," or
2. The adjudication of the case in a federal forum "would be disruptive of state efforts to establish a coherent policy with respect to a matter of substantial public concern."

Burford abstention is closely related to Thibodaux abstention, derived from Louisiana Power & Light Co. v. City of Thibodaux, 360 U.S. 25 (1959), which occurs when a federal court sitting in diversity jurisdiction chooses to allow a state to decide issues of state law that are of great public importance to that state, to the extent that a federal determination would infringe on state sovereignty.

Unlike the abstention doctrines raised in federal question cases, there is a strong presumption that federal courts should not apply Burford or Thibodaux Abstention.

=== Colorado River abstention ===
The Colorado River abstention, from Colorado River Water Conservation District v. United States, 424 U.S. 800 (1976) comes into play where parallel litigation is being carried out, particularly where federal and state court proceedings are simultaneously being carried out to determine the rights of parties with respect to the same questions of law.

In contrast to Pullman and other key abstention doctrines that came before, Colorado River is in application prudential and discretionary, concerned not so much with comity as with avoidance of waste from duplicate litigation.

The classification of the doctrine as a form of abstention has been disputed, with some courts simply calling it a "doctrine of exceptional circumstances".

Each of the various federal circuits has come up with its own list of factors to weigh in determining whether to abstain from hearing a case under this doctrine. Typically, these include:

- the order in which the courts assumed jurisdiction over property
- the order in which the courts assumed jurisdiction over the parties
- the relative inconvenience of the fora
- the relative progress of the two actions (added by Moses H. Cone Memorial Hospital v. Mercury Constr. Corp. in 1983)
- the desire to avoid piecemeal litigation
- whether federal law provides the rule of decision
- whether the state court will adequately protect the rights of all parties
- whether the federal filing was vexatious (intended to harass the other party) or reactive (in response to adverse rulings in the state court).

=== Ecclesiastical abstention ===
Under the ecclesiastical abstention doctrine, civil courts cannot delve into matters that focus on "theological controversy, church discipline, ecclesiastical government, or the conformity of the members of a church to the standard of morals required of them." Inserting the court’s secular values into religious affairs, the rationale goes, would inject the "power of the state into the forbidden area of religious freedom contrary to the principles of the First Amendment."

Courts have also declined to resolve disputes arising out of a business's claim that some good or service complied with the laws of a particular religion. In Mammon v. SCI Funeral Service of Florida, Inc., the Florida Court of Appeals cited the ecclesiastical abstention doctrine in rejecting a fraud and emotional distress lawsuit where a cemetery allegedly failed to provide a "proper Jewish burial" to the plaintiff's husband. Other courts have issued similar rulings in disputes over foods claimed to be Kosher or Halal where that status was disputed.

=== Note on the Rooker-Feldman doctrine ===
The Rooker-Feldman doctrine has some characteristics of an abstention doctrine, because it prohibits federal court review of state court actions. However, it does not require federal courts to abstain from hearing cases pending action in the state court, but instead deems that federal courts lack jurisdiction to hear cases already fully decided in state courts. The doctrine is not a judicially created exception to federal jurisdiction. Rather, the Rooker and Feldman cases simply recognized the fact that Congress has not granted the federal district or appeals courts statutory jurisdiction to consider appeals of state court decisions, only the Supreme Court of the United States via a writ of certiorari. It is an open question whether Congress could grant such jurisdiction.

== State court abstention doctrines ==
No national rule requires state courts to abstain from hearing cases brought in federal courts or in courts of other states, though the All Writs Act permits federal courts to enjoin state courts from hearing matters if necessary to preserve the jurisdiction of the federal court. But every state has some doctrine that lets its courts stay actions to avoid duplicative litigation.

Some states have doctrines that let state courts abstain from hearing cases already pending in other kinds of tribunals. For example, in Gavle v. Little Six, Inc., 555 N.W.2d 284 (Minn. 1996), the Minnesota Supreme Court upheld abstention where the state court might "undermine the authority of the tribal courts over Reservation affairs" or "infringe on the right of Indians to govern themselves".

== See also ==
- Domestic Relations and Probate Exceptions in Federal Diversity Jurisdiction
- Category:United States abstention case law
