= Railroad Commission v. Pullman Co. =

- Supreme Court of the United States

Argued February 4, 1941 Decided March 3, 1941
- Full case name: Railroad Commission of Texas, et al. v. Pullman Company, et al.
- Citations: 312 U.S. 496 (more) 61 S. Ct. 643; 85 L. Ed. 971; 1941 U.S. LEXIS 1102

Case history
- Prior: Appeal from the District Court of the United States for the Western District of Texas

Court membership
- Chief Justice Charles E. Hughes Associate Justices Harlan F. Stone · Owen Roberts; Hugo Black · Stanley F. Reed; Felix Frankfurter · William O. Douglas; Frank Murphy

Case opinion
- Majority: Frankfurter, joined by Hughes, McReynolds, Stone, Black, Reed, Douglas, Murphy
- Roberts took no part in the consideration or decision of the case.

Railroad Commission v. Pullman Co., 312 U.S. 496 (1941), was a case in which the United States Supreme Court determined that it was appropriate for United States federal courts to abstain from hearing a case in order to allow state courts to decide substantial Constitutional issues that touch upon sensitive areas of state social policy.

This form of abstention allows state courts to correct things like equal protection violations for themselves, thus avoiding the embarrassment of having state policy corrected by the federal courts. Under Pullman abstention, the federal court retains jurisdiction to hear the case if the state court's resolution is still constitutionally suspect.

== Facts ==
The Railroad Commission of Texas, an administrative agency in Texas issued an order requiring sleeping cars on trains to be staffed by conductors (who were white) instead of by porters (who were black). The railroad and the Pullman Company, as well as the Brotherhood of Sleeping Car Porters, sued, alleging a violation of Fourteenth Amendment equal protection. The case was initially considered by a three-judge panel of one Circuit Court judge and two local District Court judges, who held that the agency action violated the law of Texas. The case was appealed directly to the Supreme Court.

== Issue ==
Although the parties did not raise the issue before the United States Supreme Court, this case presented an opportunity for the Court to discuss whether it was appropriate for the United States District Court to grant relief, when the suit could have been brought in a state court in Texas.

== Result ==
The Supreme Court, in an opinion by Justice Frankfurter, noted that there are a number of reasons that this case should not be heard by a federal court.

- Although federal courts may often be called upon to interpret the law of a state, they are really just guessing at the conclusions a state court would arrive at when confronted by the same question.
- Furthermore, although this case presents a substantial constitutional issue, federal courts must not get into sensitive area of state social policy unless they have to. Therefore, the court concluded that the issue should be sent back to the state courts to see if the state courts can find some reason that the administrative order is invalid under state law.

== Later developments ==
Through a number of later decisions, courts clarified that in order for Pullman abstention to be invoked, three conditions must be apparent:

1. The case presents both state grounds and federal constitutional grounds for relief;
2. The proper resolution of the state ground for the decision is unclear; and
3. The disposition of the state ground could obviate adjudication of the federal constitutional ground.

The mechanics of employing the doctrine were refined in Government and Civil Employees Organizing Committee, CIO v. Windsor, and England v. Louisiana State Board of Medical Examiners. The first case held that when the issue is brought before the state court, the parties must inform the state court that a federal constitutional claim is involved—otherwise, the state court might not take that into account when interpreting the law of the state. The second case held that the parties could nonetheless reserve the right to have the federal constitutional claim adjudicated in the federal court.

== See also ==
- Abstention doctrine
- Pullman Palace Car Co. v. Speck
