= List of S. H. Kress and Co. buildings =

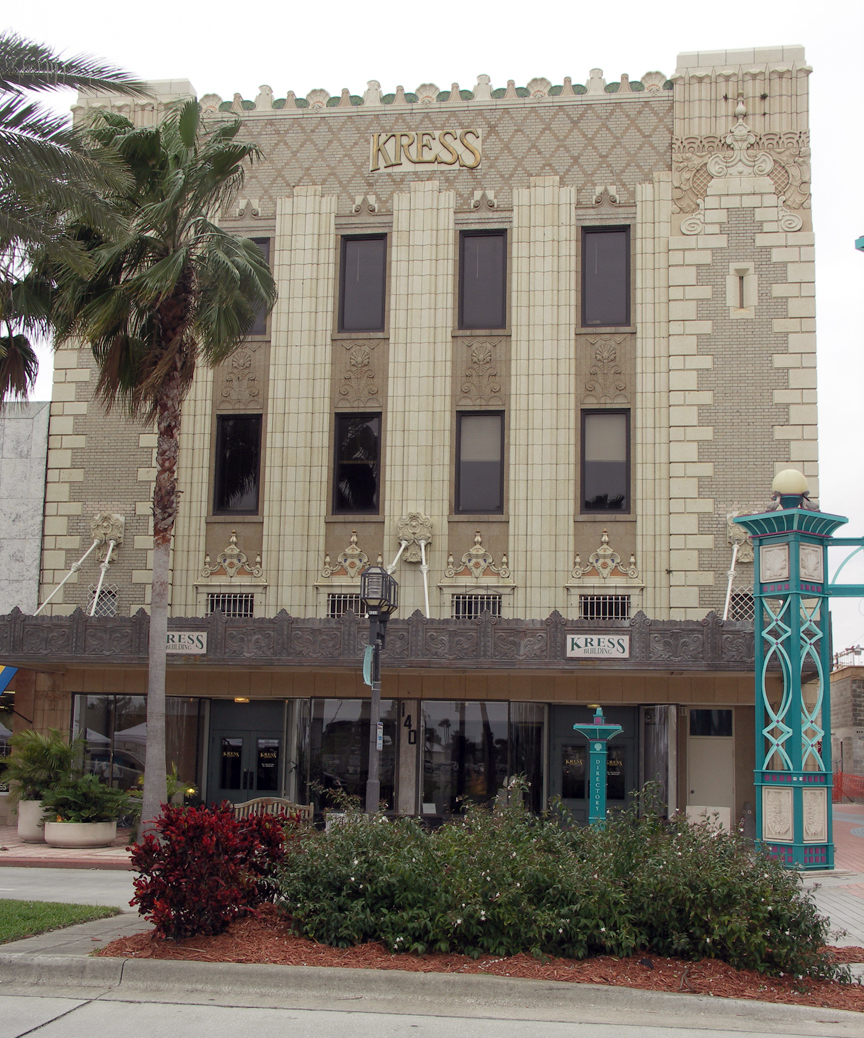
S. H. Kress and Co. Building (Daytona Beach, Florida)

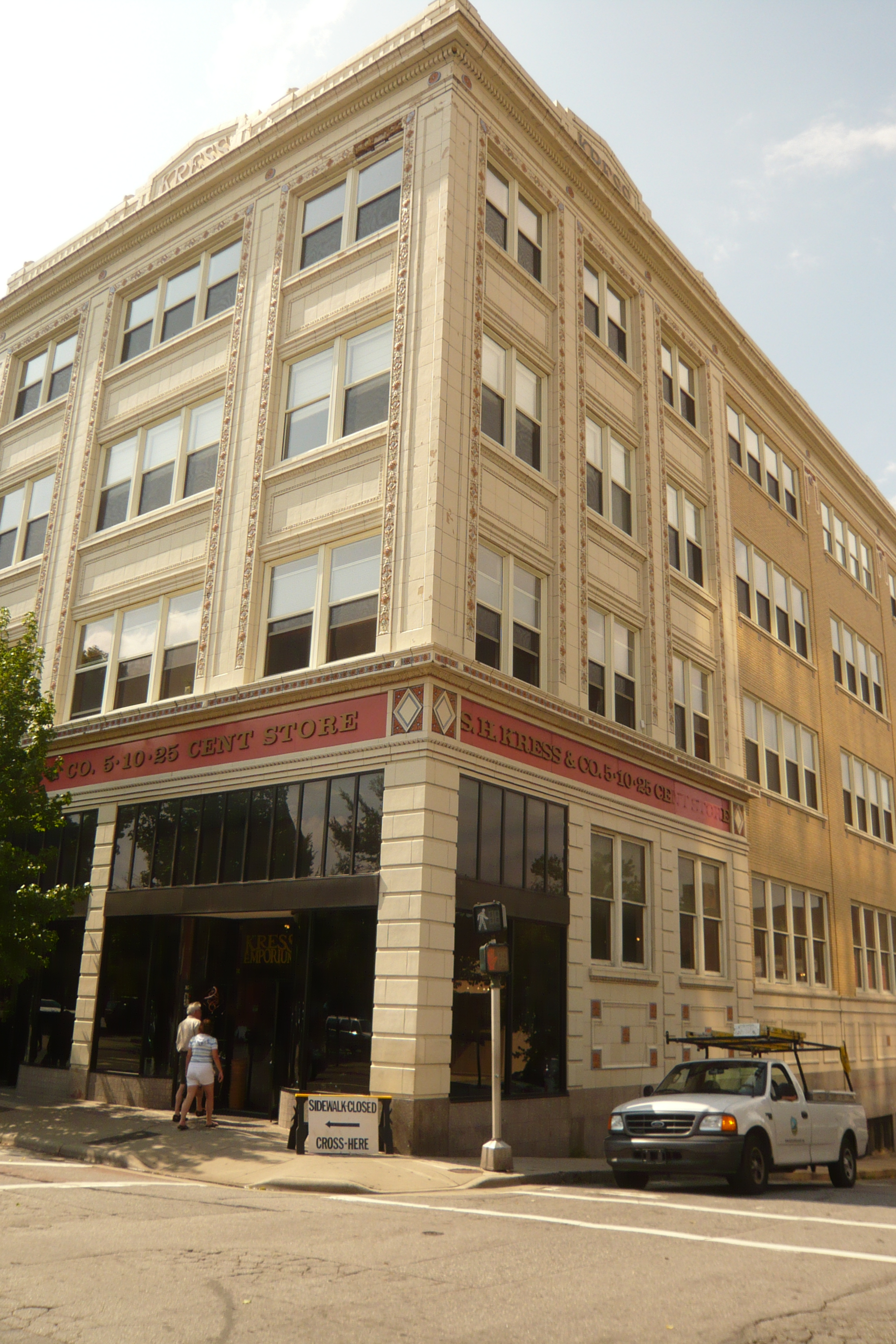
Kress Building, Asheville, North Carolina

This is a List of S. H. Kress and Co. buildings that are notable. This includes buildings named Kress Building or variations. Historic S. H. Kress & Co. structures include:

- S. H. Kress and Co. Building (Augusta, Georgia)
- S. H. Kress and Co. Building (Anniston, Alabama), listed on the NRHP in Calhoun County, Alabama in 1985
- S. H. Kress Building (Albuquerque, New Mexico), NRHP-listed in 1984
- S. H. Kress and Co. Building (Alexandria, Louisiana)
- S. H. Kress and Co. Building (Altoona, Pennsylvania)
- S. H. Kress and Co. Building (Amarillo, Texas)
- S. H. Kress and Co. Building (Americus, Georgia)
- S. H. Kress and Co. Building (Ardmore, Oklahoma)
- S. H. Kress and Co. Building (Asheville, North Carolina), NRHP-listed as part of the Downtown Asheville Historic District
- S. H. Kress and Co. Building (Athens, Georgia)
- S. H. Kress and Co. Building (Atlanta, Georgia)
- S. H. Kress and Co. Building (Bakersfield, California)
- S. H. Kress and Co. Building (Bartlesville, Oklahoma)
- S. H. Kress and Co. Building (Baton Rouge, Louisiana), listed on the NRHP in Louisiana in 2006
- S. H. Kress and Co. Building (Berkeley, California)
- S. H. Kress and Co. Building (Bessemer, Alabama)
- S. H. Kress and Co. Building (Billings, Montana)
- S. H. Kress and Co. Building (Biloxi, Mississippi)
- S. H. Kress and Company Building (Birmingham, Alabama) 1 of 3. 301 19th Street.
- S. H. Kress and Company Building (Birmingham, Alabama), listed on the NRHP in Alabama in 1982 2 of 3. 1910-1914 2nd Avenue.
- S. H. Kress and Company Building (Birmingham, Alabama) 3 of 3. 3001 27th Street.
- S. H. Kress and Co. Building (Blytheville, Arkansas), listed on the NRHP in Mississippi County, Arkansas In 1997
- S. H. Kress and Co. Building (Bristol, Tennessee)
- S. H. Kress and Co. Building (Brownsville, Texas)
- S. H. Kress and Co. Building (Brunswick, Georgia)
- S. H. Kress and Co. Building (Cairo, Illinois)
- S. H. Kress and Co. Building (Calexio, California)
- S. H. Kress and Co. Building (Charleston, South Carolina)
- S. H. Kress and Co. Building (Chanute, Kansas)
- S. H. Kress and Co. Building (Columbia, Missouri), NRHP-listed in 2005
- S. H. Kress and Co. Building (Columbia, South Carolina), NRHP-listed in 1979
- S. H. Kress and Co. Building (Columbus, Georgia), listed on the NRHP in Georgia in 1980
- S. H. Kress and Co. Building (Corpus Christi, Texas)
- S. H. Kress and Co. Building (Daytona Beach, Florida), NRHP-listed in 1983 and again in 1988
- S. H. Kress and Co. Building (Del Rio, Texas)
- S. H. Kress Building (Denison, Texas)
- S. H. Kress and Co. Building (Denver, Colorado)
- S. H. Kress and Co. Building (Dothan, Alabama), NRHP-listed as part of the Main Street Commercial District (Dothan, Alabama) in 1983.
- S. H. Kress and Co. Building (Durham, North Carolina)
- S. H. Kress and Co. Building (Eagle Pass, Texas)
- S. H. Kress and Co. Building (East Orange, New Jersey)
- S. H. Kress and Co. Building (Elizabethton, Tennessee)
- S. H. Kress Building (El Paso, Texas)
- S. H. Kress and Co. Building (Emporia, Kansas), listed on the NRHP in Kansas in 1983
- S. H. Kress and Co. Building (Enid, Oklahoma)
- S. H. Kress and Co. Building (Fairbanks, Alaska)
- S. H. Kress and Co. Building (Fayetteville, North Carolina)
- S. H. Kress and Co. Building (Florence, South Carolina)
- S. H. Kress and Co. Building (Fort Myers, Florida)
- S. H. Kress and Co. Building (Fort Scott, Kansas)
- S. H. Kress and Co. Building (Fort Smith, Arkansas)
- S. H. Kress and Co. Building (Fort Worth, Texas), NRHP-listed in 2007
- S. H. Kress and Co. Building (Fresno, California)
- S. H. Kress and Co. Building (Gadsden, Alabama)
- S. H. Kress and Co. Building (Galveston, Texas)
- S. H. Kress and Co. Building (Gastonia, North Carolina)
- S. H. Kress and Co. Building (Goldsboro, North Carolina)
- S. H. Kress and Co. Building (Grand Junction, Colorado)
- S. H. Kress and Co. Building (Great Falls, Montana)
- S. H. Kress and Co. Building (Greeley, Colorado)
- S. H. Kress and Co. Building (Greensboro, North Carolina)
- S. H. Kress and Co. Building (Greenville, South Carolina)
- S. H. Kress and Co. Building (Greenville, Texas)
- S. H. Kress and Co. Building (Guthrie, Oklahoma)
- S. H. Kress and Co. Building (Hattiesburg, Mississippi), involved U.S. Supreme Court Case [the linked page is for a SCOTUS case not this building]
- S. H. Kress and Co. Building (Helena, Arkansas)
- S. H. Kress and Co. Building (Hillsboro, Texas)
- S. H. Kress and Co. Building (Hilo, Hawaii)
- S. H. Kress and Co. Building (Hot Springs, Arkansas)
- S. H. Kress and Co. Building (Houston), NRHP-listed in 2002
- S. H. Kress and Co. Building (Huntsville, Alabama), listed on the NRHP in Alabama in 1980
- S. H. Kress and Co. Building (Hutchinson, Kansas)
- S. H. Kress and Co. Building (Idaho Falls, Idaho), listed on the NRHP in Idaho in 1984
- S. H. Kress and Co. Building (Inglewood, California)
- S. H. Kress and Co. Building (Iola, Kansas)
- S. H. Kress and Co. Building (Jacksonville, Florida)
- S. H. Kress and Co. Building (Johnson City, Tennessee), Currently owned by Allied Dispatch Solutions, LLC
- S. H. Kress and Co. Building (Key West, Florida)
- S. H. Kress and Co. Building (Knoxville, Tennessee)
- S. H. Kress and Co. Building (La Grange, Florida)
- S. H. Kress and Co. Building (Lakeland, Florida)
- S. H. Kress and Co. Building (Laredo, Texas)
- S. H. Kress and Co. Building (Laurel, Mississippi)
- S. H. Kress and Co. Building (Lawrence, Kansas)
- S. H. Kress and Co. Building (Little Rock, Arkansas)
- S. H. Kress and Co. Building (Long Beach, California), listed among the Long Beach historic landmarks
- S. H. Kress and Co. Building (Longview, Texas)
- S. H. Kress and Co. Building (Los Angeles, California) 1 of 5. 8617 Broadway.
- S. H. Kress and Co. Building (Los Angeles, California) 2 of 5. 629 South Broadway.
- S. H. Kress and Co. Building (Los Angeles, California) 3 of 5. 5350 Wilshire Boulevard.
- S. H. Kress and Co. Building (Los Angeles, California) 4 of 5. 4601 South Broadway.
- S. H. Kress and Co. Building (Los Angeles, California) 5 of 5. 6608 Hollywood Boulevard.
- S. H. Kress and Co. Building (Lubbock, Texas), NRHP-listed in 1992
- S. H. Kress and Co. Building (Macon, Georgia)
- S. H. Kress and Co. Building (Memphis, Tennessee), listed on the NRHP in Tennessee
- S. H. Kress and Co. Building (Meridian, Mississippi)
- S. H. Kress and Co. Building (Miami, Florida)
- S. H. Kress and Co. Building (Miami Beach, Florida)
- S. H. Kress and Co. Building (Mobile, Alabama)
- S. H. Kress and Co. Building (Modesto, California)
- S. H. Kress and Co. Building (Montgomery, Alabama)
- S. H. Kress and Co. Building (Muskogee, Oklahoma)
- S. H. Kress and Co. Building (Nashville, Tennessee)
- S. H. Kress and Co. Building (Natchez, Mississippi)
- S. H. Kress and Co. Building (New Bern, North Carolina)
- S. H. Kress and Co. Building (New Orleans, Louisiana)
- S. H. Kress and Co. Building (NYC, New York) 1 of 3. 444 5th Avenue.
- S. H. Kress and Co. Building (NYC, New York) 2 of 3. 256-258 West 125th Street.
- S. H. Kress and Co. Building (NYC, New York) 3 of 3. 1915 3rd Avenue.
- S. H. Kress & Co. Building (Nogales, Arizona), listed on the NRHP in Arizona in 1985
- S. H. Kress and Co. Building (Oakland, California)
- S. H. Kress and Co. Building (Oklahoma City, Oklahoma)
- S. H. Kress and Co. Building (Okmulgee, Oklahoma)
- S. H. Kress and Co. Building (Orangeburg, South Carolina)
- S. H. Kress and Co. Building (Orlando, Florida), 1936
- S. H. Kress and Co. Building (Paris, Texas)
- S. H. Kress and Co. Building (Parsons, Kansas)
- S. H. Kress and Co. Building (Pasadena, California)
- S. H. Kress and Co. Building (Pine Bluff, Arkansas)
- S. H. Kress and Co. Building (Pittsburg, Kansas)
- S. H. Kress and Co. Building (Pocatello, Idaho)
- S. H. Kress and Co. Building (Pomona, California)
- S. H. Kress and Co. Building (Ponca City, Oklahoma)
- S. H. Kress and Co. Building (Port Arthur, Texas)
- S. H. Kress and Co. Building (Portland, Oregon), NRHP-listed in 1996
- S. H. Kress and Co. Building (Provo, Utah)
- S. H. Kress and Co. Building (Pueblo, Colorado)
- S. H. Kress and Co. Building (Richmond, California)
- S. H. Kress and Co. Building (Riverside, California)
- S. H. Kress and Co. Building (Roanoke, Virginia)
- S. H. Kress and Co. Building (Rockford, Illinois)
- S. H. Kress and Co. Building (Rocky Mount, North Carolina)
- S. H. Kress and Co. Building (Rome, Georgia)
- S. H. Kress and Co. Building (Roswell, New Mexico)
- S. H. Kress and Co. Building (Sacramento, California)
- S. H. Kress and Co. Building (St. Petersburg, Florida), NRHP-listed in 2001
- S. H. Kress and Co. Building (Salina, Kansas)
- S. H. Kress and Co. Building (Salisbury, North Carolina)
- S. H. Kress and Co. Building (Salt Lake City, Utah)
- S. H. Kress and Co. Building (San Antonio, Texas) 1 of 2. 311-315 East Houston Street.
- S. H. Kress and Co. Building (San Antonio, Texas) 2 of 2. 149 West Commerce Street.
- S. H. Kress and Co. Building (San Pedro, California)
- S. H. Kress and Co. Building (Santa Rosa, California)
- S. H. Kress and Co. Building (Sapulpa, Oklahoma)
- S. H. Kress and Co. Building (Sarasota, Florida), NRHP-listed in 1984
- S. H. Kress and Co. Building (Savannah, Georgia)
- S. H. Kress and Co. Building (Seattle, Washington) 1 of 3. 1419-1431 3rd Avenue.
- S. H. Kress and Co. Building (Seattle, Washington) 2 of 3. 2220 NW Market Street.
- S. H. Kress and Co. Building (Seattle, Washington) 3 of 3. 4546 California Ave SW.
- S. H. Kress and Co. Building (Selma, Alabama)
- S. H. Kress and Co. Building (Shawnee, Oklahoma)
- S. H. Kress and Co. Building (Sherman, Texas)
- S. H. Kress and Co. Building (Spartanburg, South Carolina), NRHP-listed as part of the Spartanburg Historic District
- S. H. Kress and Co. Building (Spokane, Washington)
- S. H. Kress & Co. Building (Stockton, California), 1930
- S. H. Kress and Co. Building (Tacoma, Washington)
- S. H. Kress and Co. Building (Tampa, Florida), NRHP-listed in 1983
- S. H. Kress and Co. Building (Texarkana, Texas)
- S. H. Kress and Co. Building (Trinidad, Colorado)
- S. H. Kress and Co. Building (Tulsa, Oklahoma)
- S. H. Kress & Co. Building (Tuscaloosa, Alabama)
- S. H. Kress and Co. Building (Tyler, Texas)
- S. H. Kress and Co. Building (Waco, Texas)
- S. H. Kress and Co. Building (Waycross, Georgia)
- S. H. Kress and Co. Building (Wenatchee, Washington)
- S. H. Kress Company Building (Wichita, Kansas), listed on the NRHP in Kansas in 1985
- S. H. Kress and Co. Building (Wilmington, North Carolina)
- S. H. Kress and Co. Building (Ybor City, Florida)
- S. H. Kress and Co. Building (Youngstown, Ohio), listed on the NRHP in Ohio in 1986
- S. H. Kress and Co. Building (Yuma, Arizona)

== See also ==
- George R. Kress House, Los Angeles, CA
- Kresge Building (disambiguation)
