= Kresge =

Kresge may refer to:

- Kresge (surname)
- S. S. Kresge Corporation, a former American department store chain, predecessor of Kmart retail stores
- The Kresge Foundation, a philanthropic organization established by Sebastian S. Kresge in 1924
- Kresge Hearing Research Institute, a research institute of Department of Otolaryngology in Ann Arbor, Michigan
- Kresge College, one of the residential colleges that make up the University of California, Santa Cruz
- Kresge Auditorium, a main performance space on the campus of the Massachusetts Institute of Technology
- MIT Chapel or Kresge Chapel, on the campus of the Massachusetts Institute of Technology
- Kresge Building (disambiguation)
- Kresge Art Museum, predecessor of the Eli and Edythe Broad Art Museum on the campus of Michigan State University
