= S. H. Kress and Co. Building (Fort Worth, Texas) =

- Kress Building
- U.S. National Register of Historic Places
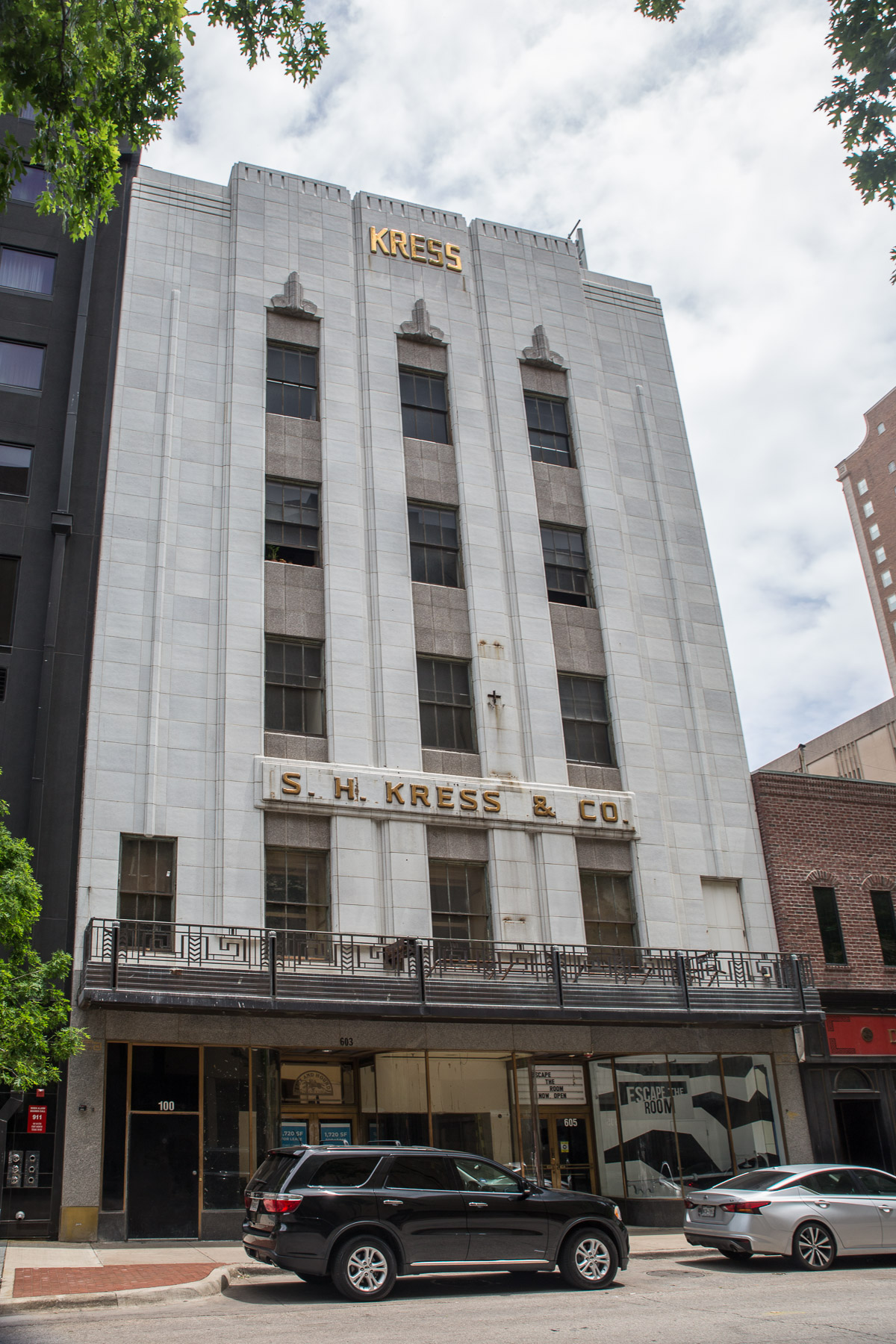
- Kress Building in 2021

- Location within Texas Location within the United States
- Location: 604 Main St., Fort Worth, Texas
- Coordinates: 32°45′12″N 97°19′52″W
- Area: less than one acre
- Built: 1936
- Built by: W. H. Bowen Construction Co. (El Paso, Texas)
- Architect: Edward F. Sibbert
- Architectural style: Moderne
- NRHP reference No.: 07000266
- Added to NRHP: April 4, 2007

The Kress Building, also known as S.H. Kress and Co. Building, is a Classical Moderne Art Deco building in downtown Fort Worth. Designed by New York architect Edward F. Sibbert, the five-story Kress building served the “five-and-dime” chain from 1936 through 1960 and was one of the only major construction projects in Fort Worth built using private money during the Great Depression. It was listed on the National Register of Historic Places in 2007. In 2016, the building was converted into downtown housing.

== 1905-1960: Background and Kress Ownership ==
The S.H. Kress company had a long-established presence in Fort Worth prior to 1936. The national chain of five-and-dimes first arrived in Cowtown in 1905 and since had moved into its third space in 1924. In 1936 it was determined a new structure was needed to handle growing business. Kress architect Edward F. Sibbert's design mimicked much of the flagship New York store’s design while making room for Meso-American accents (such as the stylized Mayan caps above the upper windows) popular throughout Fort Worth’s Art Deco buildings. Other key decorative features included an Italian marble floor and suspended second story ceiling that allowed for an expansive, pillar-less ground floor.

A technological marvel for its time, the Kress building was one of the first buildings in Fort Worth to be equipped with a central air-conditioning system. Additionally, a vermin-proof refrigerated room for the store’s confections drew considerable attention from the public. The Kress Company relocated at the end of December 1960 for the suburbs.

== 1960-2004: Transition ==
Following the relocation of five-and-dime business to a shopping center, the Kress Building housed Heritage Hall (a museum), a religious display, two women’s clothing stores, and the offices of Continental National Bank. In 1973 the building was purchased by Evelyn Clay O’Hara. In 1989 the short-lived “Kress Club” was located on the first floor, followed by the more successful Hyena Comedy Club in 1993. In 2001 the Club relocated to the larger basement of the tower to make room for a growing audience; the Fox and Hound sports bar took over the street level space.

== 2005-Present: The “Kress Mess” and Mixed-Use Development ==
In 2005 plans to renovate the upper floors of the Kress Building for conversion into downtown loft housing began. The multimillion-dollar project met a considerable financial and logistical challenge early on when a contractor blocked an incinerator shaft. The long-vacant upper floors of the building had been home to thousands of Mexican free-tailed bats, which became trapped between the walls. Dubbed the “Kress Mess” and “Nightmare on Houston Street” by the local press and animal rights activists, 1,800 bats perished while hundreds more, hungry and terrified, flooded through the Hyena Comedy Club and Fox and Hound restaurant, causing thousands in damages and inciting chaos. Volunteers managed to save several hundred stranded and injured bats, which were transported and released at Mineral Wells. Renovations were complete in 2006, although the building was later sold as part of a bankruptcy settlement. In 2007 the Kress Building was added to the National Register of Historic Places.

The tower is currently owned by Mike Karns, CEO of the Firebird Restaurant Group.

== See also ==
- National Register of Historic Places listings in Tarrant County, Texas
