= S. H. Kress and Co. Building (Columbia, South Carolina) =

- Kress Building
- U.S. National Register of Historic Places
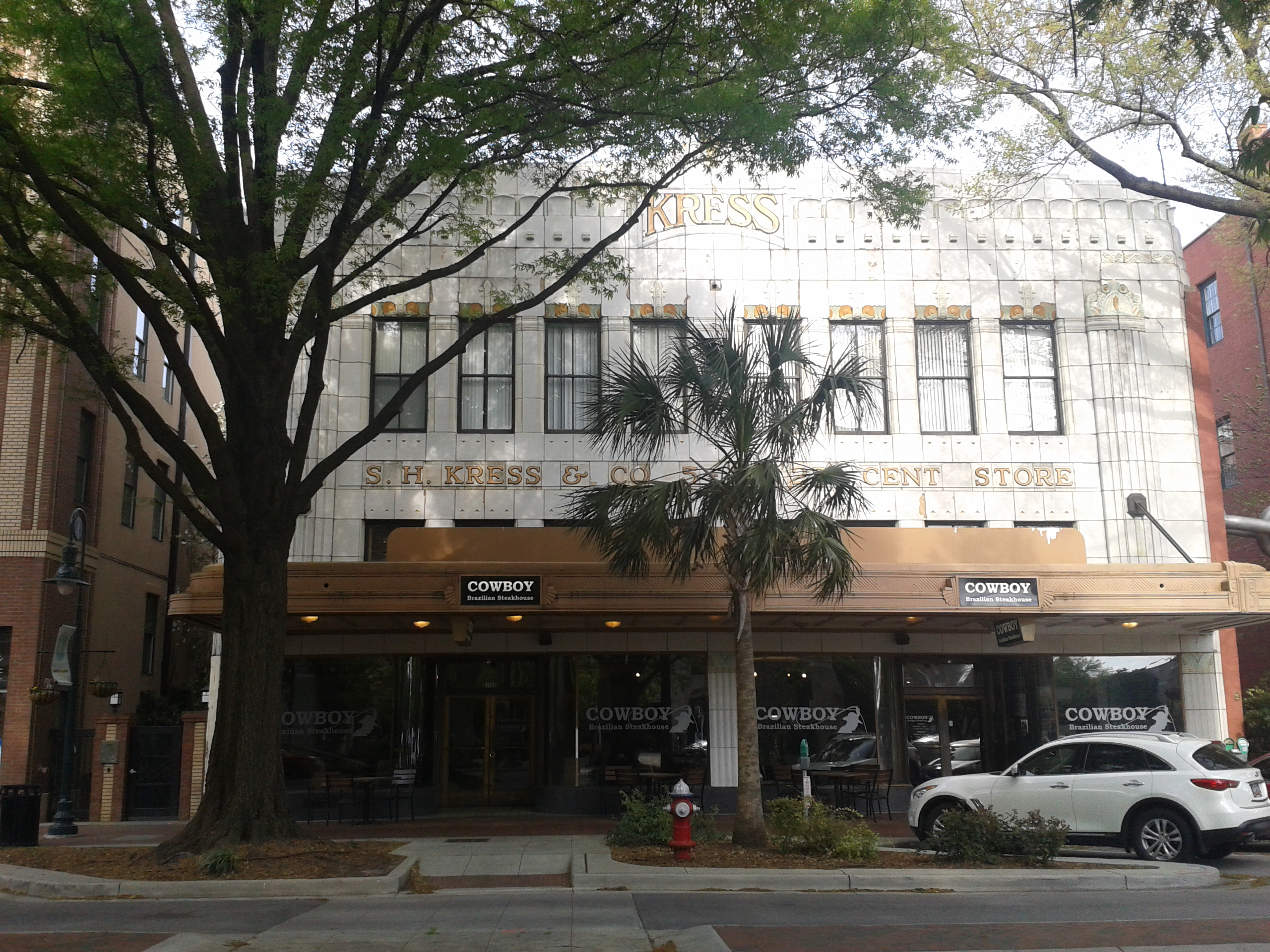
- Kress Building (Columbia, South Carolina) in April, 2015

- Location within South Carolina Location within the United States
- Location: 1508 Main St., Columbia, South Carolina
- Coordinates: 34°0′20″N 81°2′8″W
- Area: 0.2 acres (0.081 ha)
- Built: 1934
- Architect: Edward Sibbert
- Architectural style: Art Deco
- MPS: Columbia MRA
- NRHP reference No.: 79003376
- Added to NRHP: March 2, 1979

Kress Building is a historic commercial building located at Columbia, South Carolina across the street from the Columbia Museum of Art. It was built in 1934 by S. H. Kress & Co., and is a two-story, Art Deco style building faced with white terra cotta and colored terra cotta ornamentation. It features rounded storefront windows and cornice that contains the word "Kress" and surmounted by a stepped parapet.

As of 2016, the bottom floor is a Brazilian Steakhouse and the 2nd floor houses apartments. A penthouse is planned for the roof.

It was added to the National Register of Historic Places in 1979.
