= S. H. Kress and Co. Building (Daytona Beach, Florida) =

- U.S. National Register of Historic Places
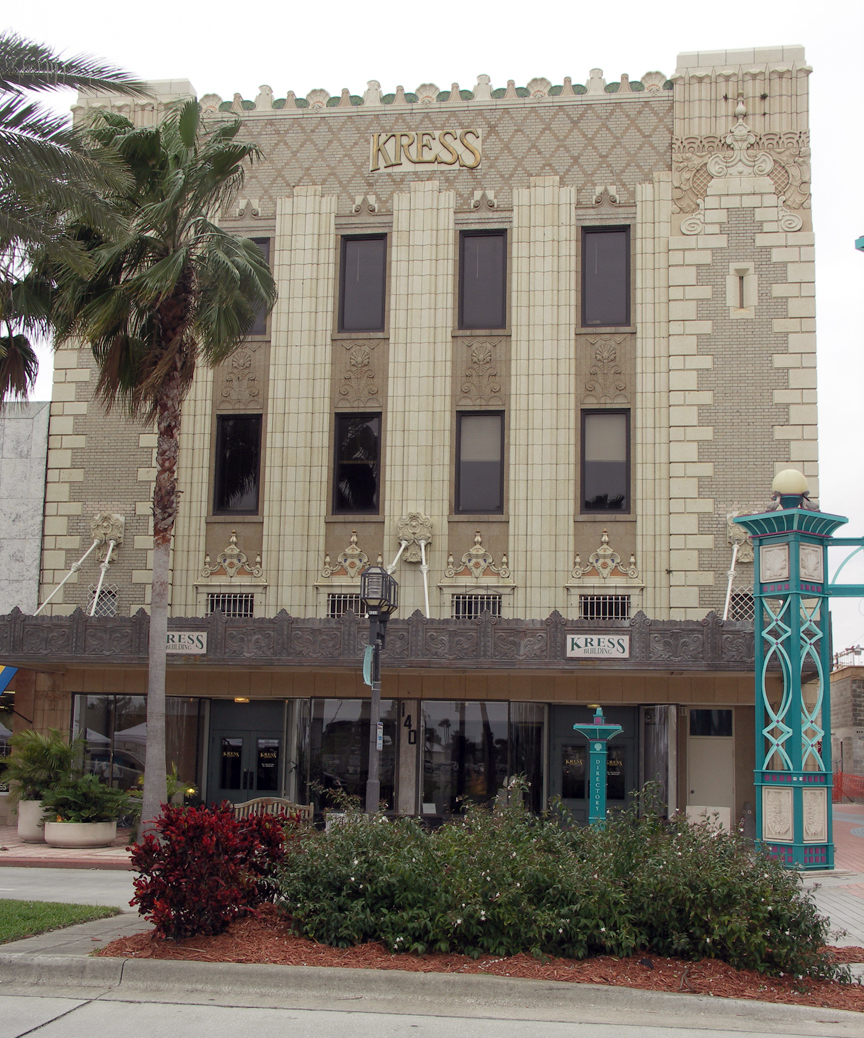

- Location within Volusia County
- Location: Daytona Beach, Florida
- Coordinates: 29°12′38″N 81°1′10″W
- Built: 1932
- Architect: G. A. Miller, Inc., Edward Sibbert
- Architectural style: Art Deco
- NRHP reference No.: 83001442
- Added to NRHP: July 7, 1983

The S. H. Kress and Co. Building at 140 South Beach Street in Daytona Beach, Florida, United States is celebrating its 91st year in continuous operation now as home to 40 professional office suite businesses in the historic building. In 1932 it was designed as one of America's 225 architectural "Main Street" treasures of the S. H. Kress & Co. "five and dime" department store chain. On July 7, 1983, it was added to the U.S. National Register of Historic Places.

The building is owned by Mac Smith, a Daytona Beach businessman who has owned it for over 40 years. It was subdivided into 21,000 sq ft (2,000 m^{2}) of office space in the early 1980s. Among the major professional office suites is the Celebration Title Group, the Balliker Art Gallery, Guaranteed Rate, DC Construction Company, Jane Devine, LMFT, Musca Law, Prime Lending, Zinn Legal, Street Smarts, Shawn Brown Insurance, Strategic Wealth Investments, William Weeks Architecture . Volusia Land Management Group, The office building is a family partnership business operated by the Smith family and dedicated to reinvigorating the downtown business community.
