= S. H. Kress and Co. Building (Lubbock, Texas) =

- Kress Building
- U.S. National Register of Historic Places
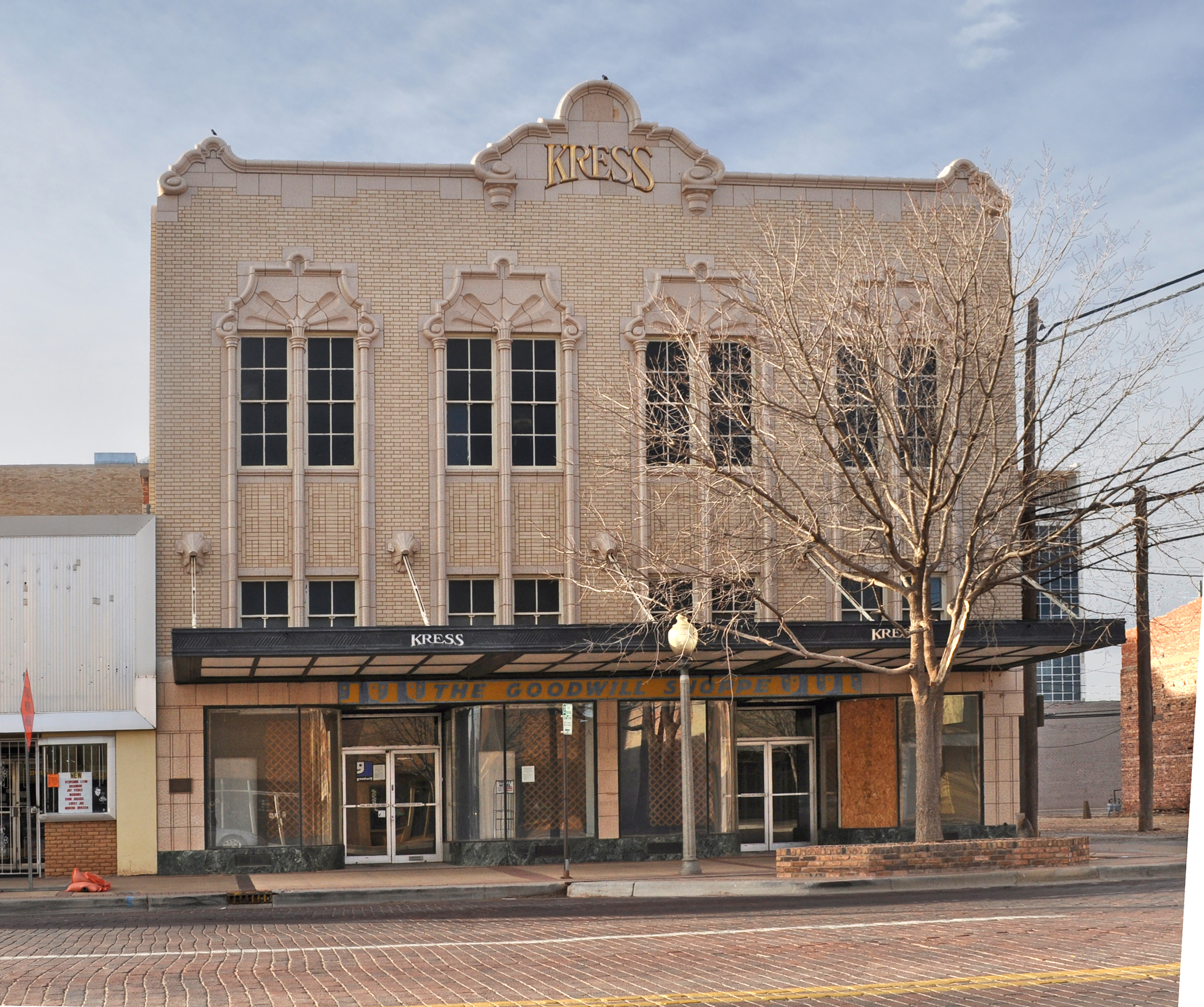
- Kress Building

- Location within Texas Location within the United States
- Location: 1109 Broadway, Lubbock, Texas
- Coordinates: 33°35′5″N 101°50′50″W
- Area: less than one acre
- Built: 1932
- Architect: Edward F. Sibbert
- Architectural style: Mission/Spanish Revival
- NRHP reference No.: 92001305
- Added to NRHP: October 2, 1992

The Kress Building at 1109 Broadway in Lubbock, Texas was built in 1932 as a S. H. Kress & Co. store building. It was listed on the National Register of Historic Places in 1992.

It is a Mission/Spanish Revival-style influenced building designed by Edward F. Sibbert. It was a S.H. Kress Company store until 1975.

== See also ==
- National Register of Historic Places listings in Lubbock County, Texas
