= Kress Building (Huntsville, Alabama) =

- U.S. National Register of Historic Places
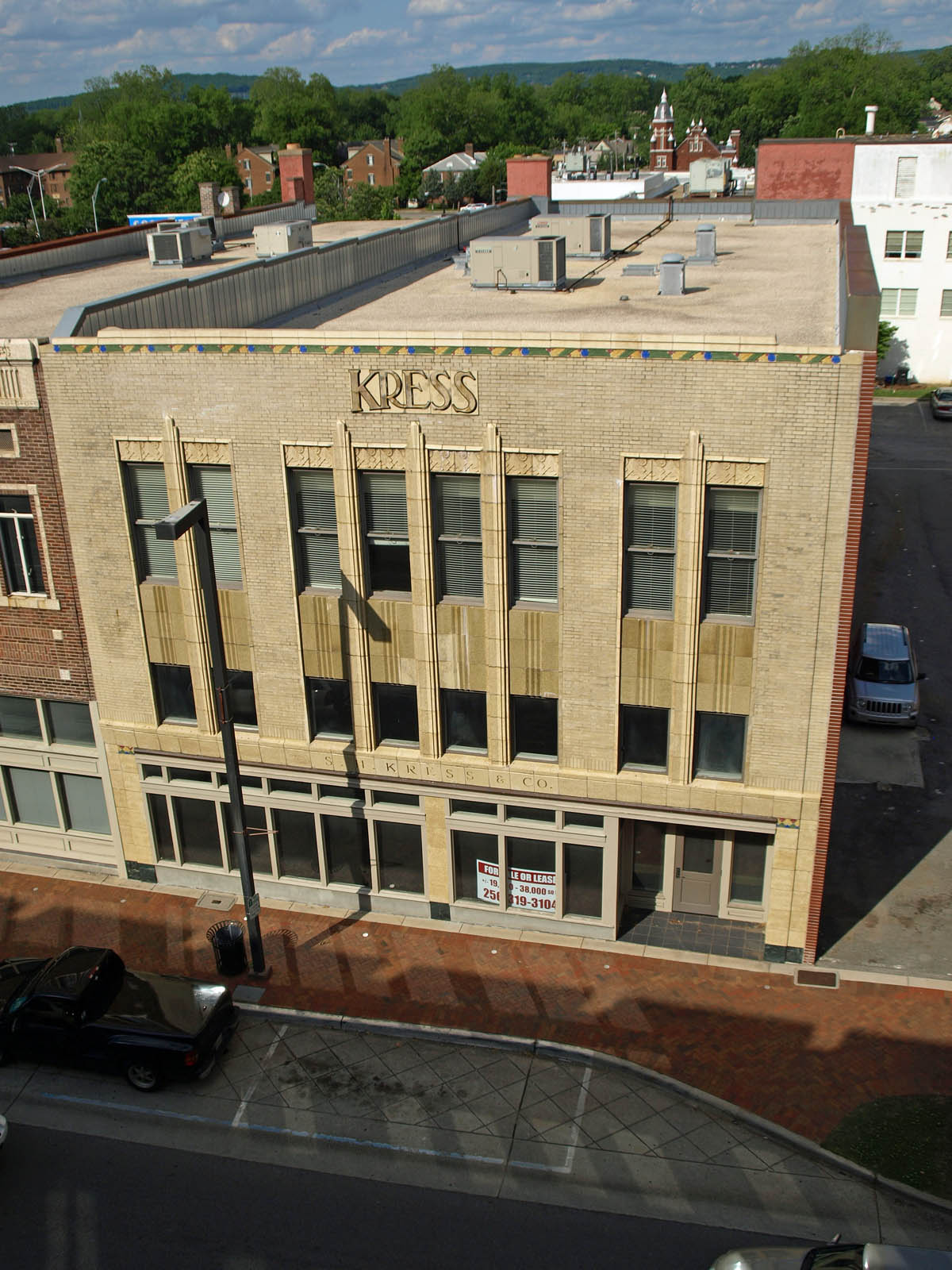
- The Kress Building in 2011

- Location within Alabama
- Location: 107 S. Washington St., Huntsville, Alabama
- Coordinates: 34°43′53″N 86°35′7″W
- Area: less than one acre
- Built: 1931
- Architect: Edward Sibbert
- Architectural style: Art Deco
- MPS: Downtown Huntsville MRA
- NRHP reference No.: 80000717
- Added to NRHP: September 22, 1980

The Kress Building is a historic building in Huntsville, Alabama, U.S.. It was built in 1931 for S. H. Kress & Co., a chain of department stores. It was designed in the Art Deco style by architect Edward Sibbert. It has been listed on the National Register of Historic Places since September 22, 1980.
