= S. H. Kress and Co. Building (Portland, Oregon) =

Historic building in Portland, Oregon, U.S.

- Kress Building
- U.S. National Register of Historic Places
- Portland Historic Landmark
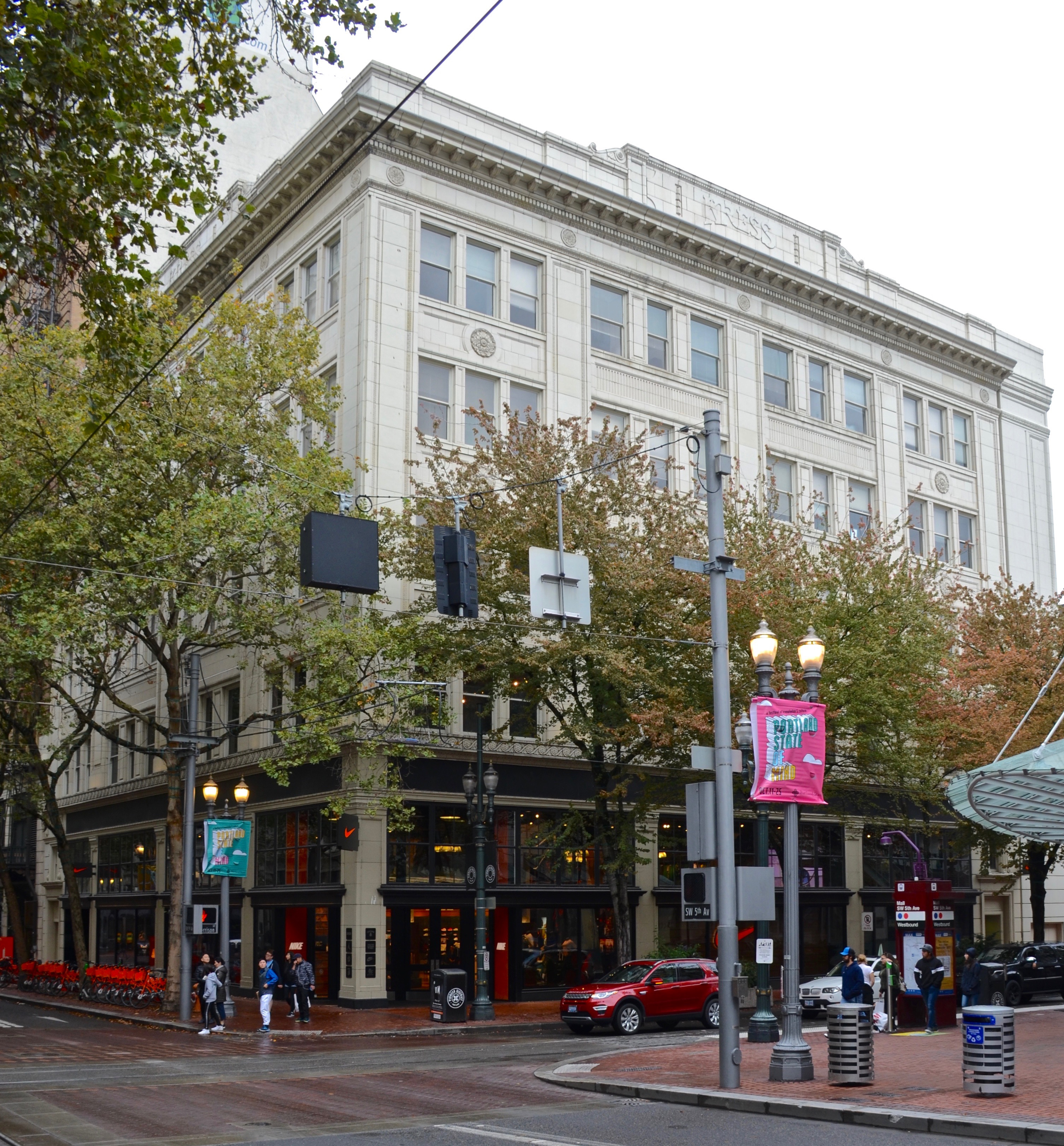
- Seen from 5th Avenue in 2018, with "Kress" lettering visible on the cornice

- Location within Portland, Oregon Location within Oregon Location within the United States
- Location: 638 SW 5th Avenue; Portland, Oregon
- Coordinates: 45°31′08″N 122°40′38″W
- Area: 0.3 acres (1,200 m^{2})
- Built: 1928
- Architect: E.J. Hoffman
- Architectural style: Chicago school, Beaux Arts Classicism
- NRHP reference No.: 96000994
- Added to NRHP: September 12, 1996

The Kress Building is a building located in downtown Portland, Oregon, listed on the National Register of Historic Places.

It was built in 1928 for S. H. Kress & Co. As of 2011, tenants of the building include Nike and Sephora.

== Description ==
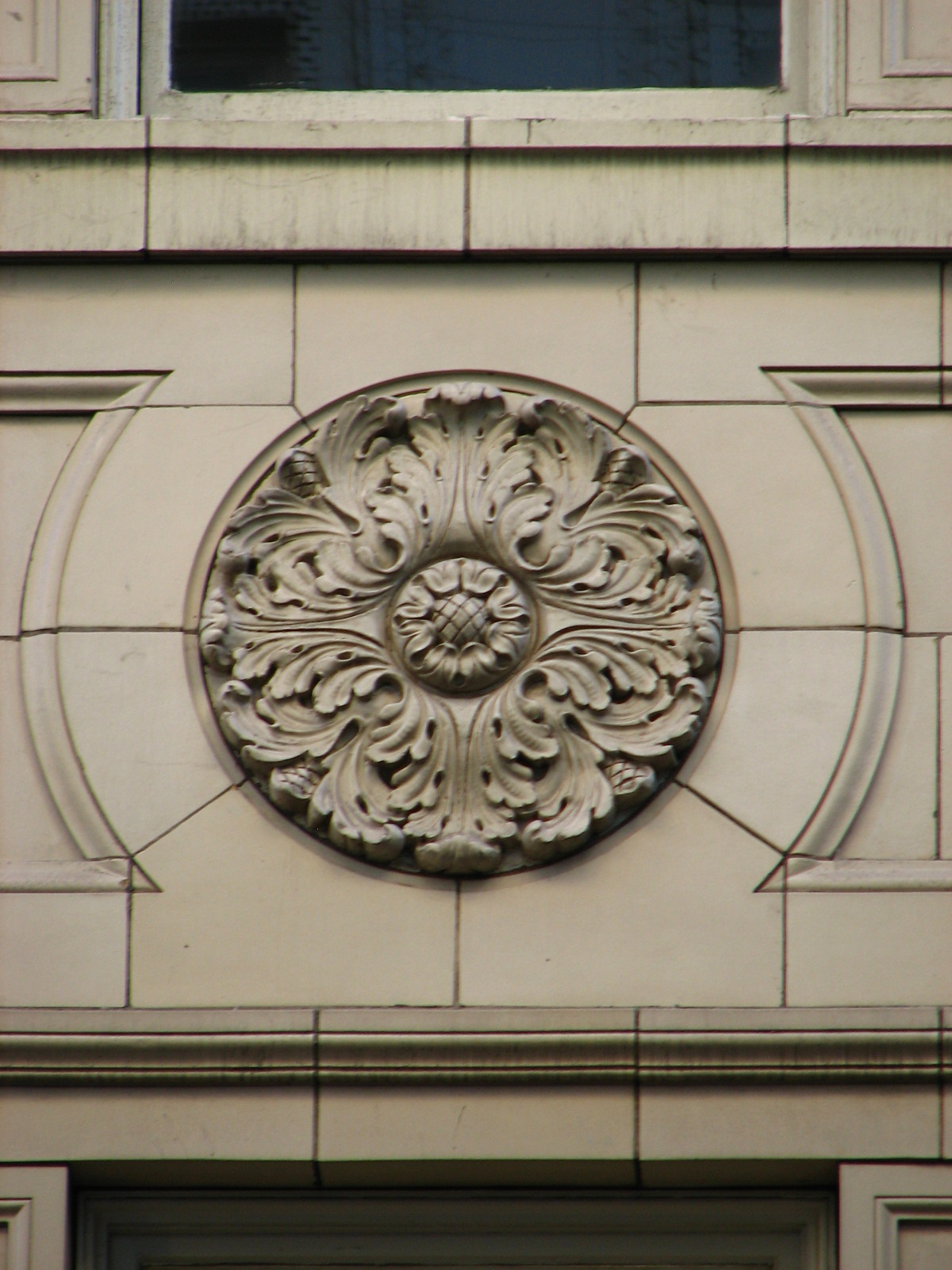
A glazed terra cotta rosette ornament from the Kress Building.

The five-story store and office building is located on the northeast corner of SW Fifth Avenue and Morrison Street in the center of Portland's retail district. It was built for S. H. Kress & Co. in 1928 from plans by their corporate architect, E. J. Hoffman.

The steel frame building rests on a concrete foundation. Its exterior is faced entirely with cream colored glazed terra cotta, enhanced with a variety of classically inspired decorative motifs. The roof is flat. The footprint of the building is rectangular; its original 100 square feet was extended to the east by a 50 × 100-foot single story wing in 1953 when an adjoining building was acquired and faced with terra cotta to conform with the rest of the block.

The store's design is in the Commercial style of the Chicago school, with detailing in the Classical vein. It exhibits the retail base including mezzanine level and multiple stories capped with a full classical entablature that are characteristic of Commercial style emporiums. The attic, or parapet wall above the cornice carries the store's title in escutcheons centered on either street face. While the entire scheme is conservative, especially in consideration of its late date, it is a generally well-preserved and well-crafted part of the aggregation of fireproof tall buildings dating from the 1910s and 1920s which distinguishes Portland's central business district.

== See also ==
- National Register of Historic Places listings in Southwest Portland, Oregon
