= Kresge (surname) =

Kresge is a surname. Notable people with the surname include:

- Alisa Kresge (born 1985), American college basketball coach
- Cliff Kresge (born 1968), American golfer
- Geoff Kresge, songwriter, guitarist, bassist, and record producer
- George Joseph Kresge (born 1935), American mentalist, the Amazing Kreskin
- Karen Kresge (born 1957), British choreographer
- Sebastian Spering Kresge (1867–1966), American merchant and philanthropist, founder of Kmart

Fictional characters:

- Lynne Kresge, character in the second season of the TV series 24
