= S. H. Kress and Co. Building (Houston) =

Historic building in Houston, Texas, U.S.

- Kress Building
- U.S. National Register of Historic Places
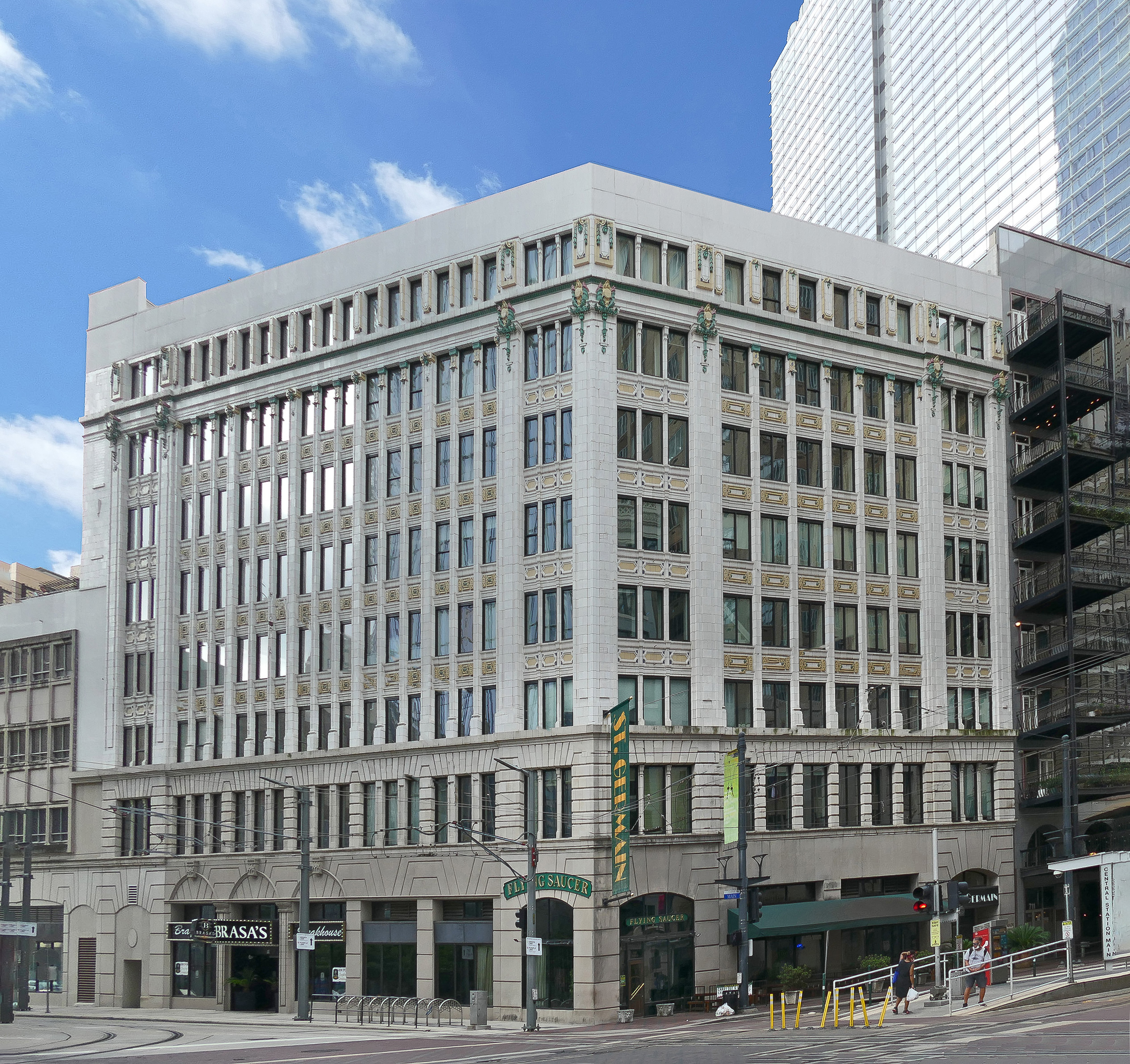
- The building's exterior in 2020

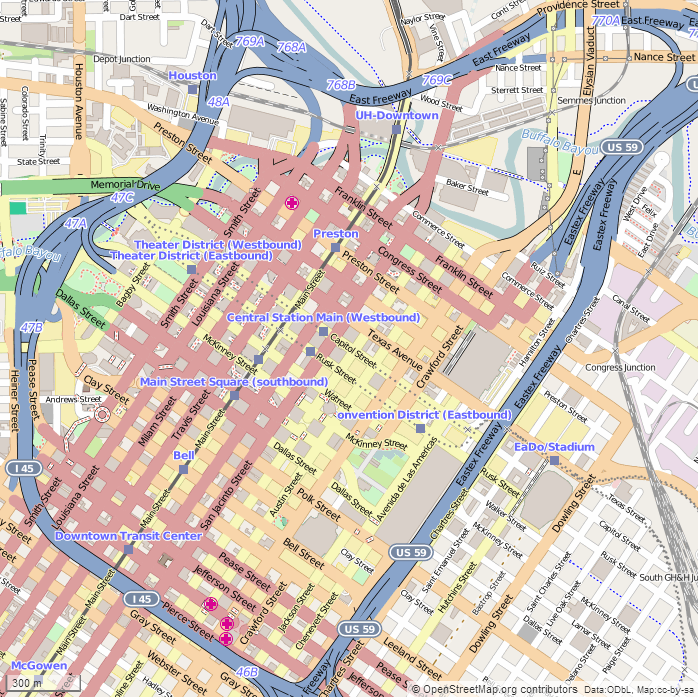
- Location within Houston Downtown Location within Texas Location within the United States
- Location: 705 Main St., Houston, Texas
- Coordinates: 29°45′32.1″N 95°21′47″W
- Area: less than one acre
- Built: 1913
- Built by: Buchanan and Gilder
- Architect: Seymour Burrell
- Architectural style: Renaissance
- NRHP reference No.: 02001102
- Added to NRHP: October 4, 2002

The S. H. Kress and Co. Building, or simply the Kress Building, is located at 705 Main Street in Houston, Texas. It was listed on the National Register of Historic Places on October 4, 2002.

The eight-story building is covered almost entirely in terra cotta. A 1983 renovation removed the Kress signage and other architectural features of its retail past, but the building retains the character of a 1913 skyscraper, one of several built in downtown Houston at the time. This S. H. Kress & Co. building was one of the largest the company built, and one of the few to incorporate professional offices.

== See also ==
- National Register of Historic Places listings in Harris County, Texas
