= Spartanburg Historic District =

Historic district in South Carolina, United States

- U.S. National Register of Historic Places
- U.S. Historic district
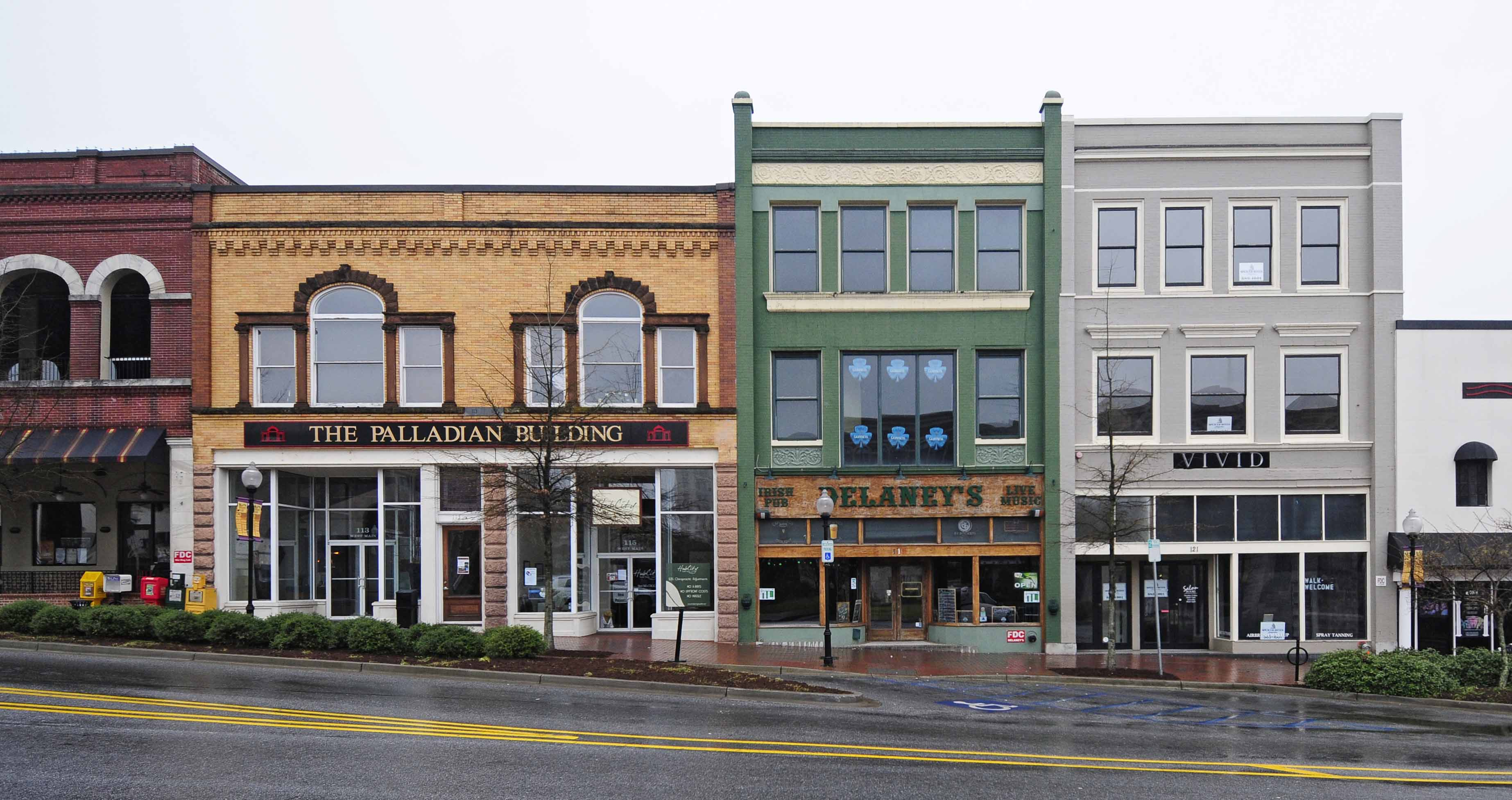

- Location within South Carolina Location within the United States
- Location: W. Main, Magnolia, Wall, Ezell, and Spring Sts., Spartanburg, South Carolina; 100 Blk. of E. Main St., (increase)
- Area: 7.4 acres (3.0 ha); 1.3 acres (0.53 ha) (increase)
- Architectural style: Early Commercial, Classical Revival, Italianate, Romanesque Revival
- NRHP reference No.: 83002209

Significant dates
- Added to NRHP: May 19, 1983
- Boundary increase: January 28, 2000

Spartanburg Historic District is a district in downtown Spartanburg, South Carolina It was named to the National Register of Historic Places in 1983. The district was expanded in 2000.

== History ==
The original district is centered on Morgan Square, which features the Daniel Morgan Monument. The district was largely built during a commercial expansion in the late 19th and early 20th century that was driven by expansion of the textile industry and railroads.

== Architecture ==
Most of the buildings are two- or three-story masonry structures. The district exhibits a variety of late 19th and early 20th century commercial architecture including Italianate Commercial, Richardson Romanesque Commercial, and simpler Commercial Style architecture. Most of the buildings have retained their original facades.

The two key structures identified in the NRHP application for the original district were the Cleveland Hotel and the Masonic Temple. The Cleveland Hotel, 178 W. Main Street, was a six-story Commercial Style building completed in 1917. After several plans to renovate it failed to come to fruition, the hotel was demolished in late 1991. The Masonic Temple, 188 W. Main Street, is a three-story brick building in Neo-Classical style.

== Gallery ==
Spartanburg Historic District

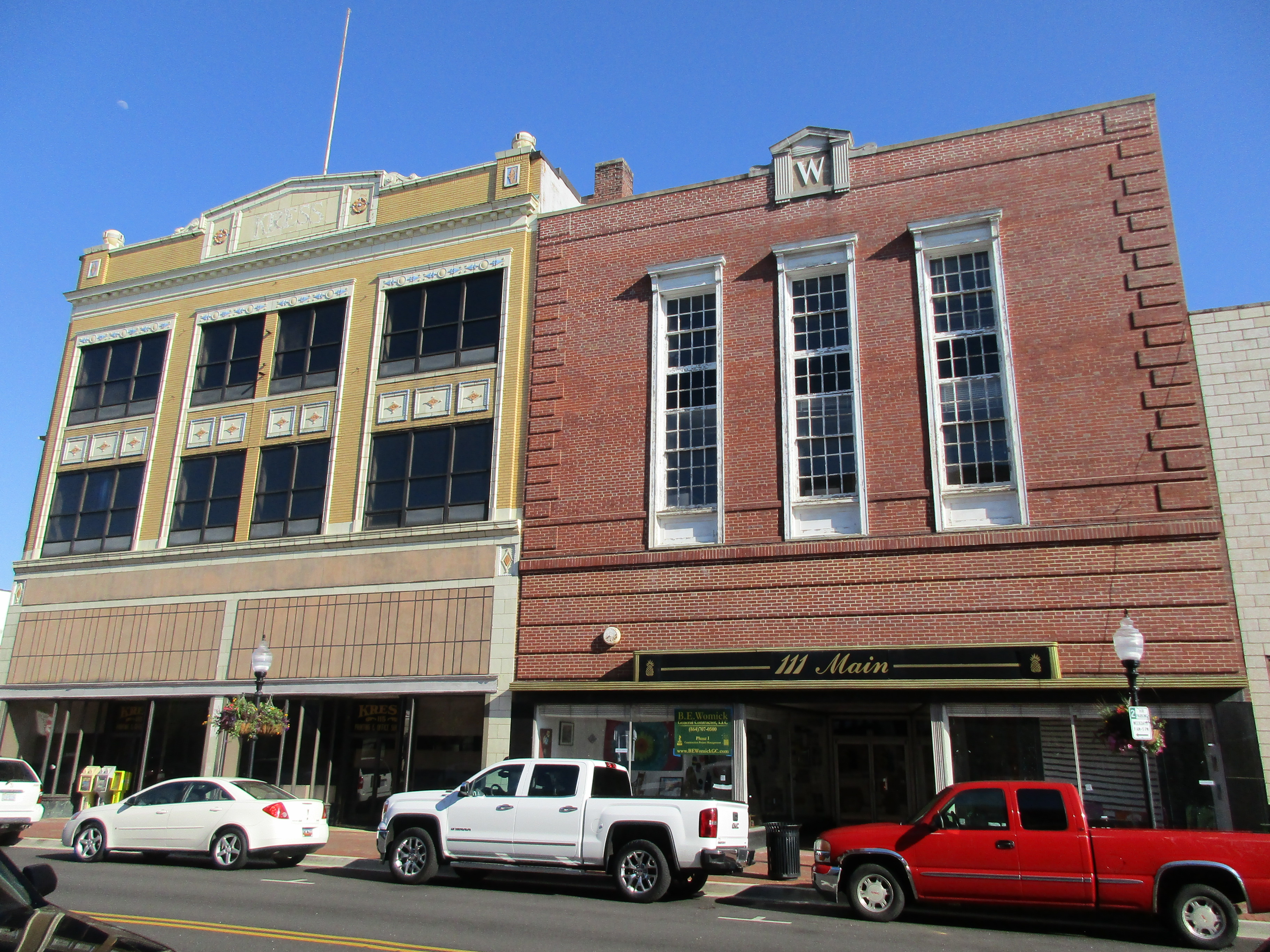
Kress and Montgomery Ward buildings

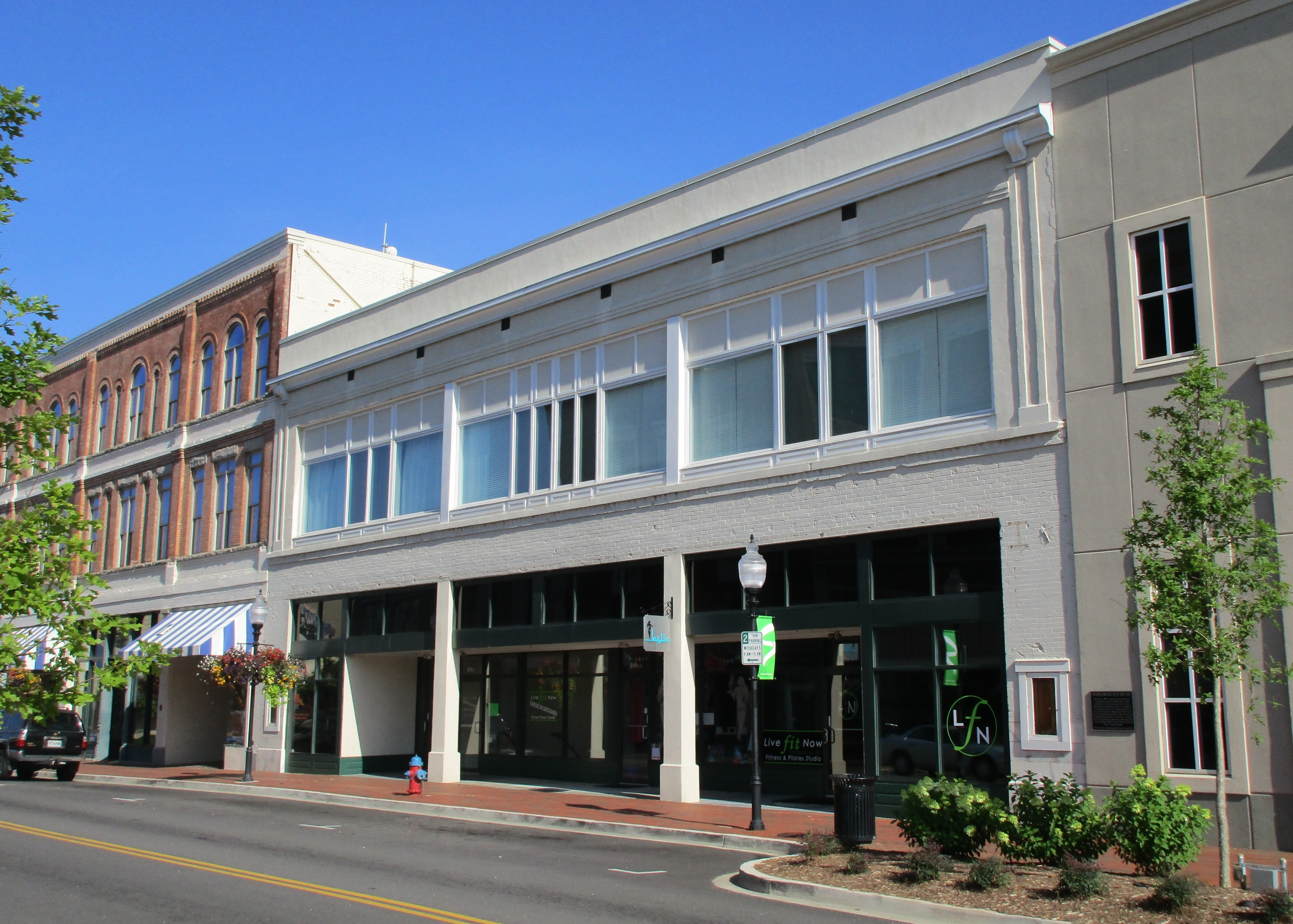
Aug. W. Smith Building

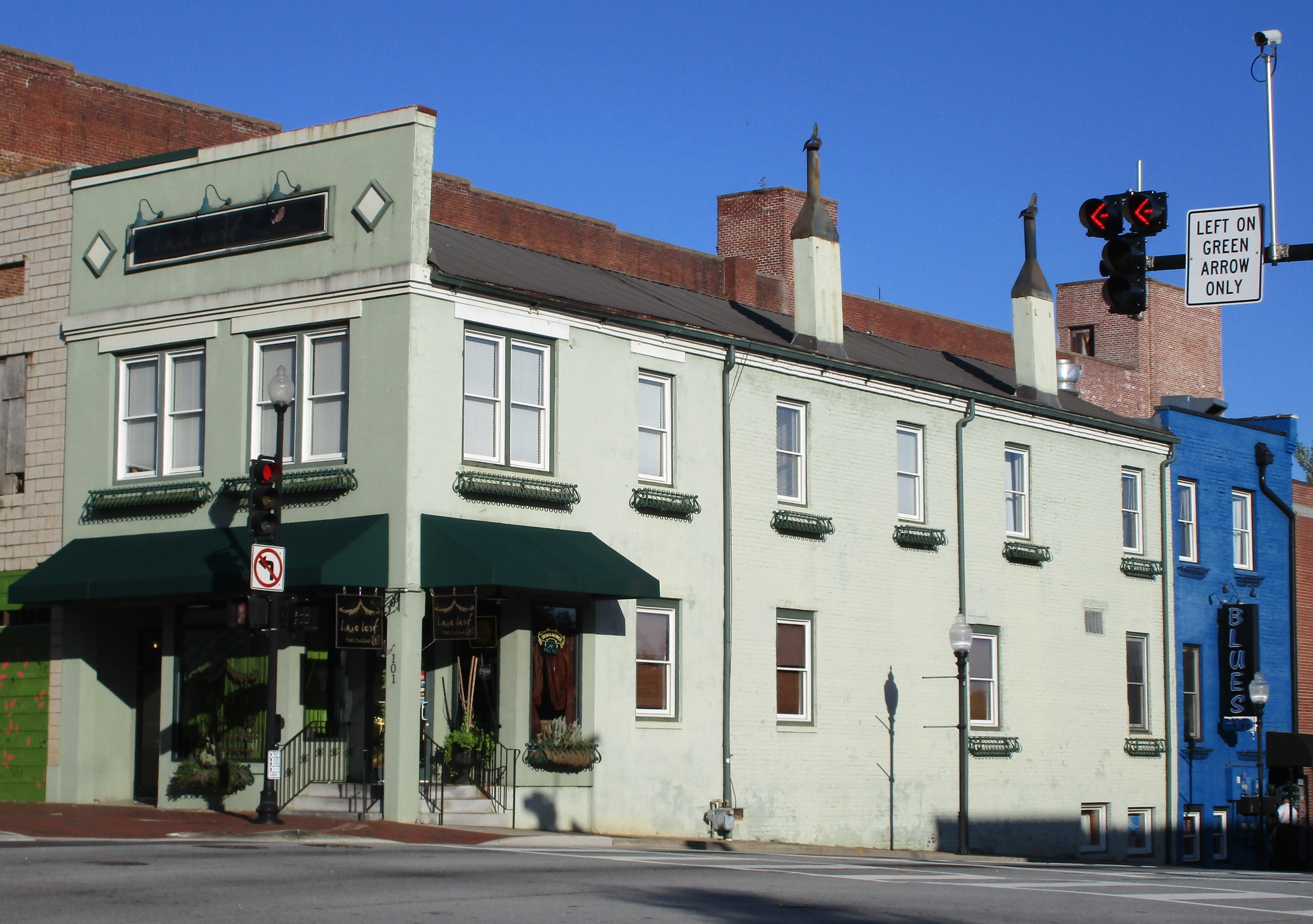
101 East Main Street

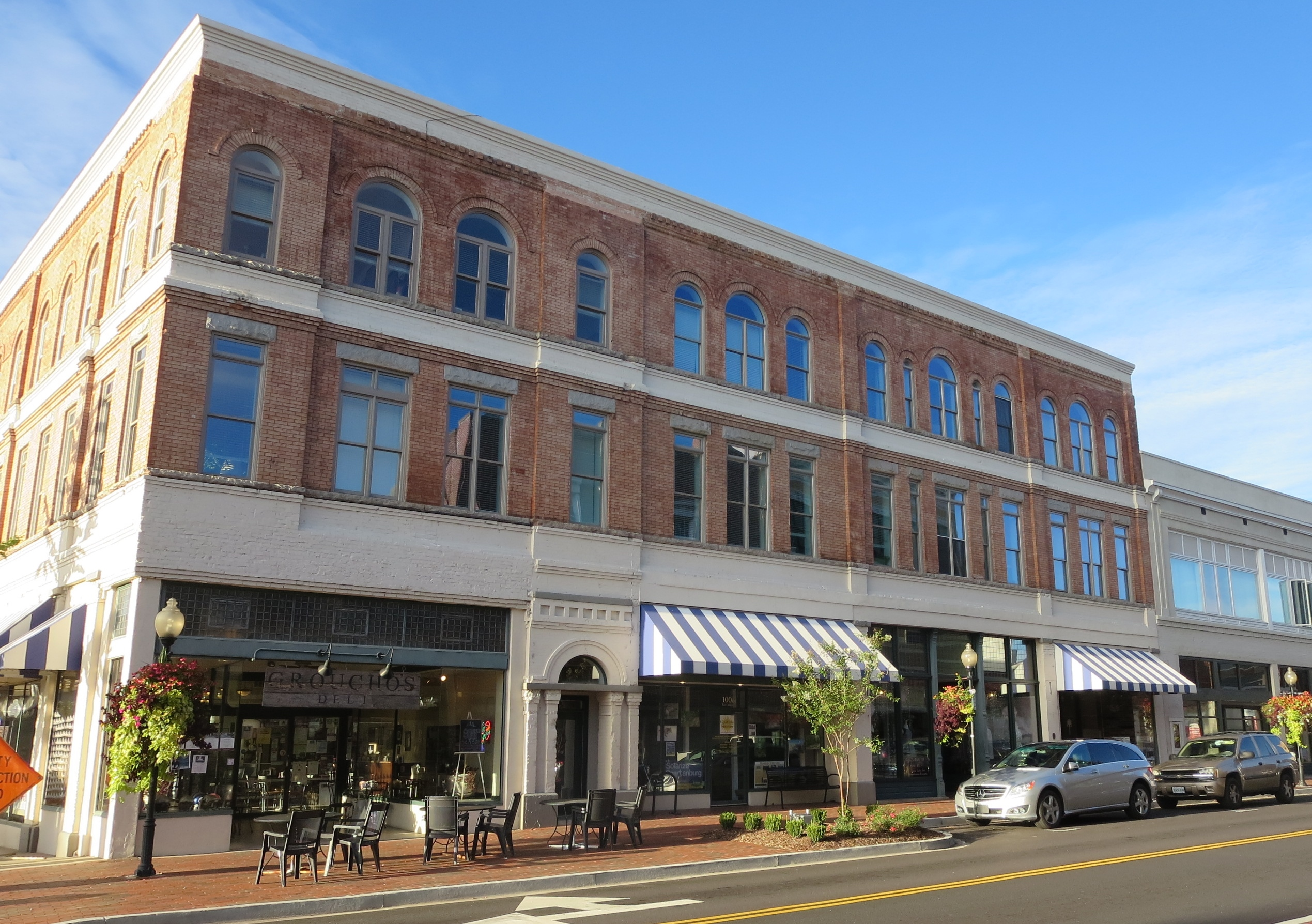
Palmetto Building

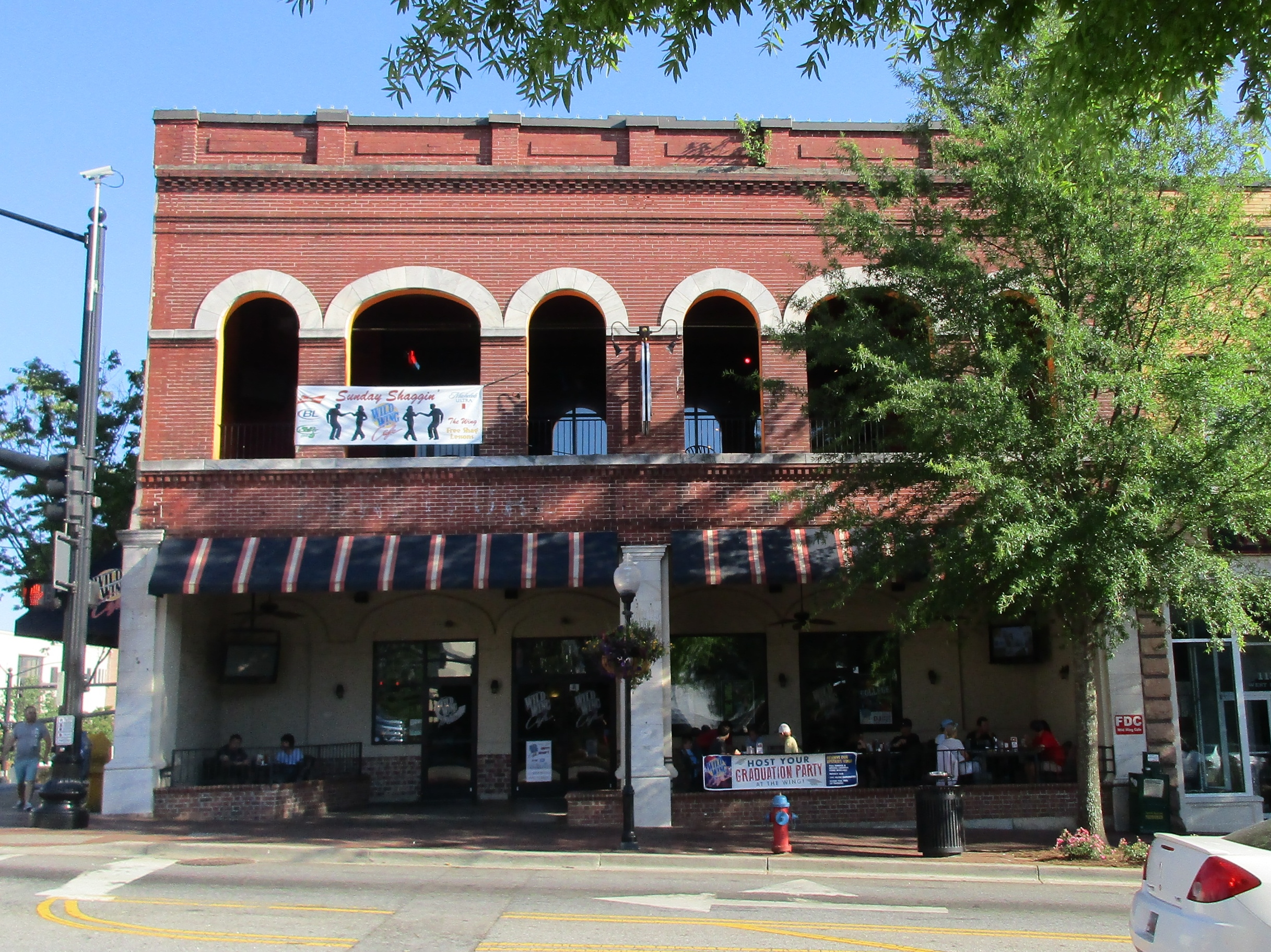
Greenewald's Building

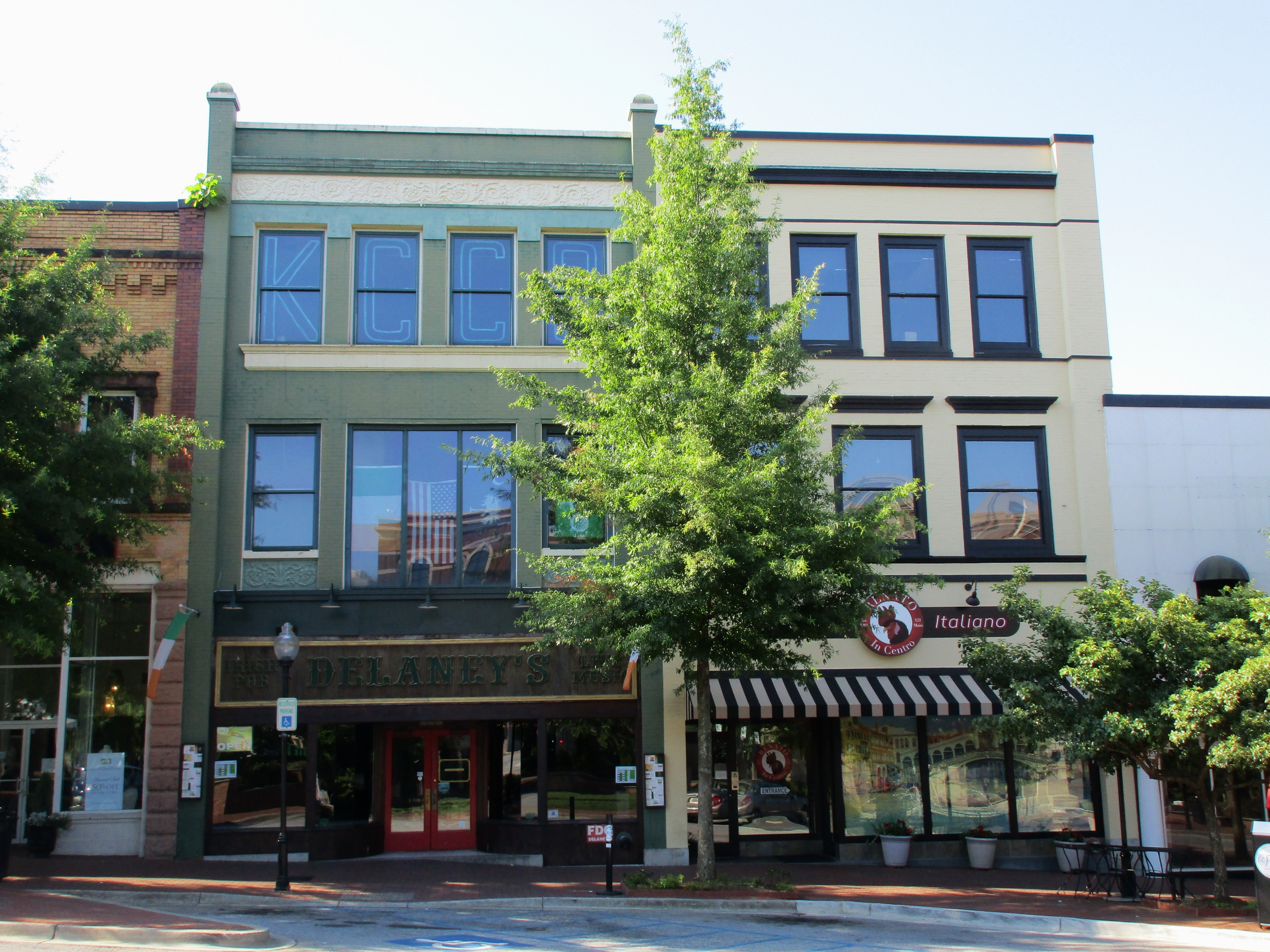
117-121 West Main Street

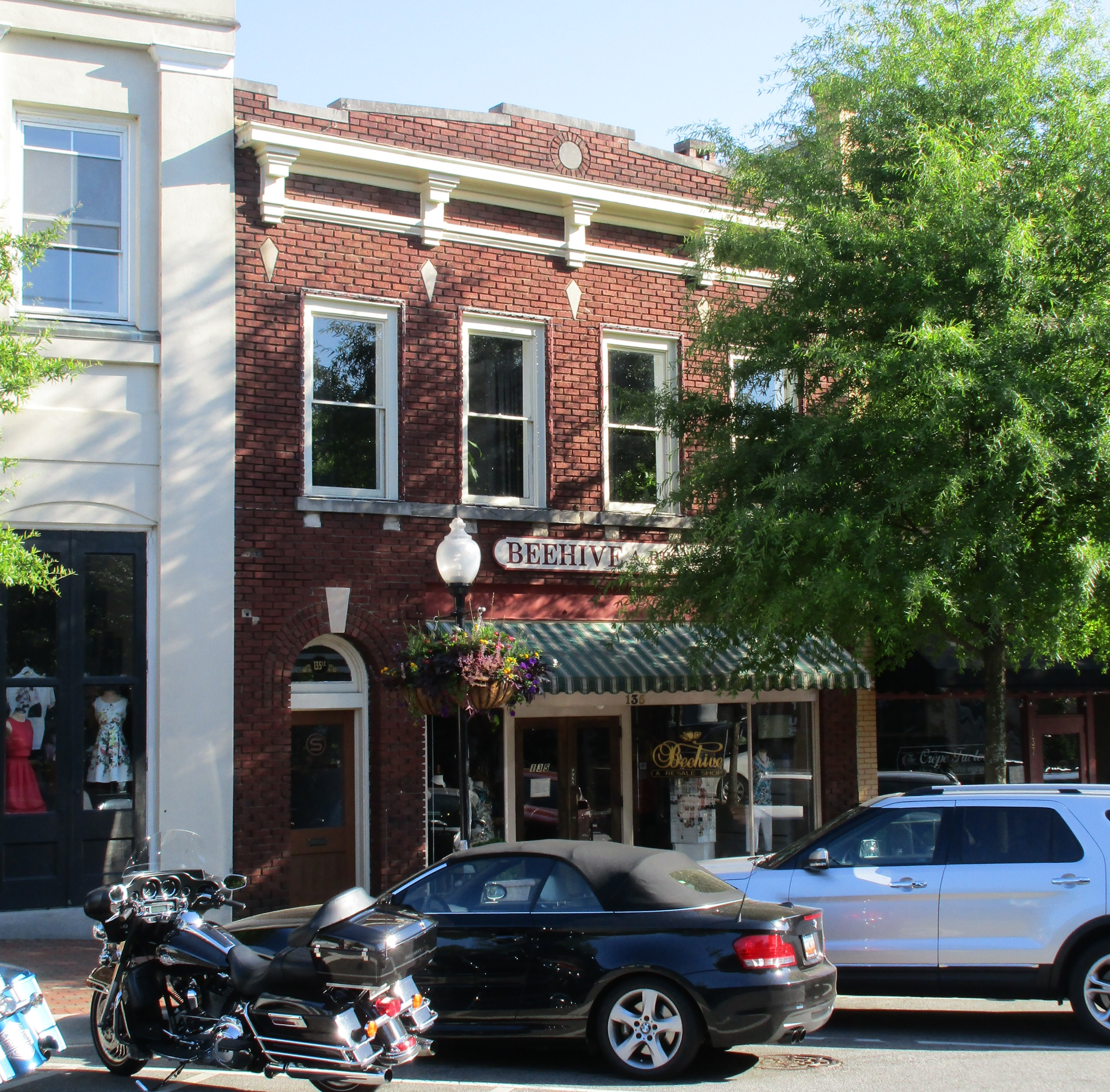
135 West Main Street

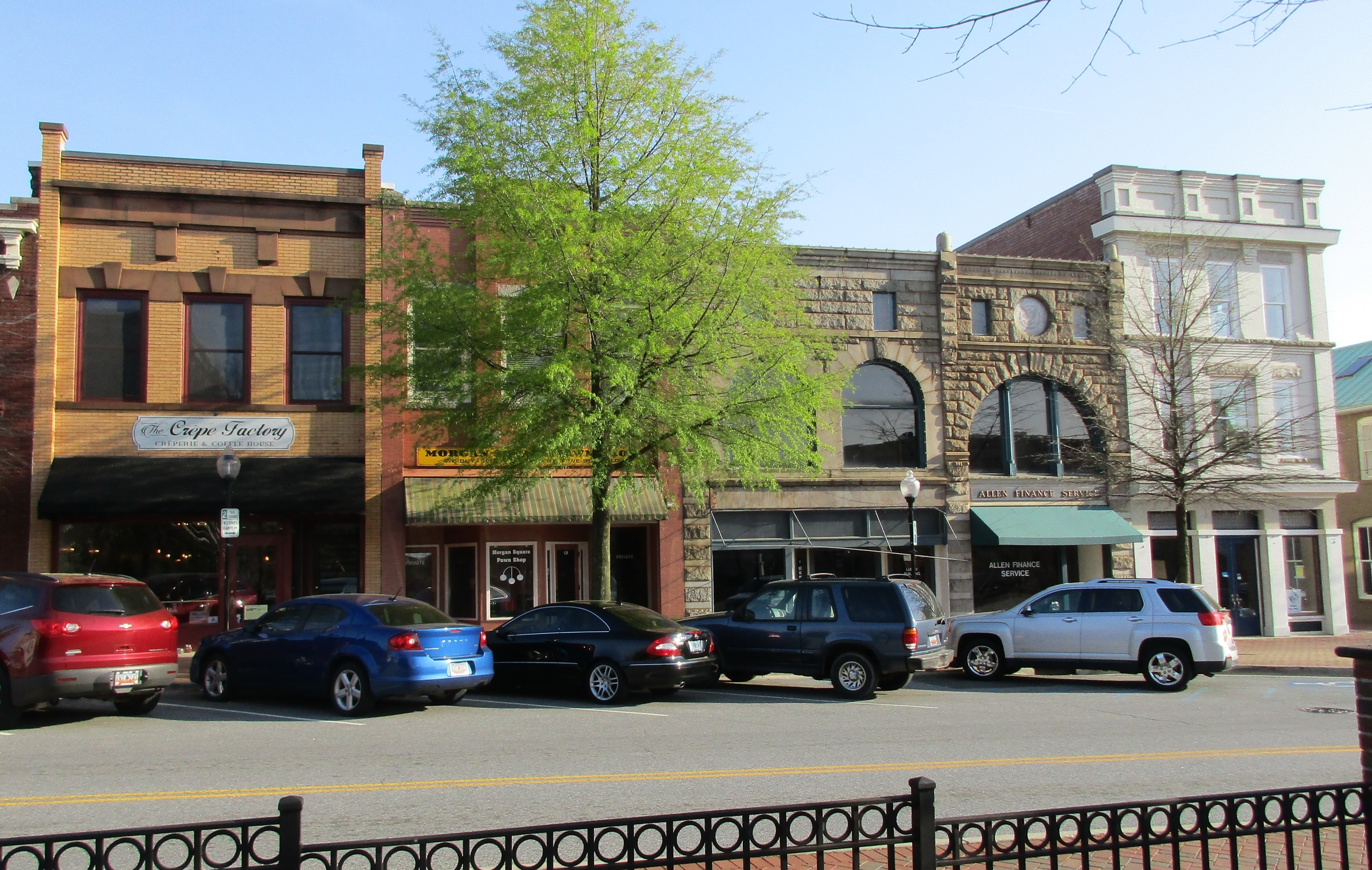
137-145 West Main Street

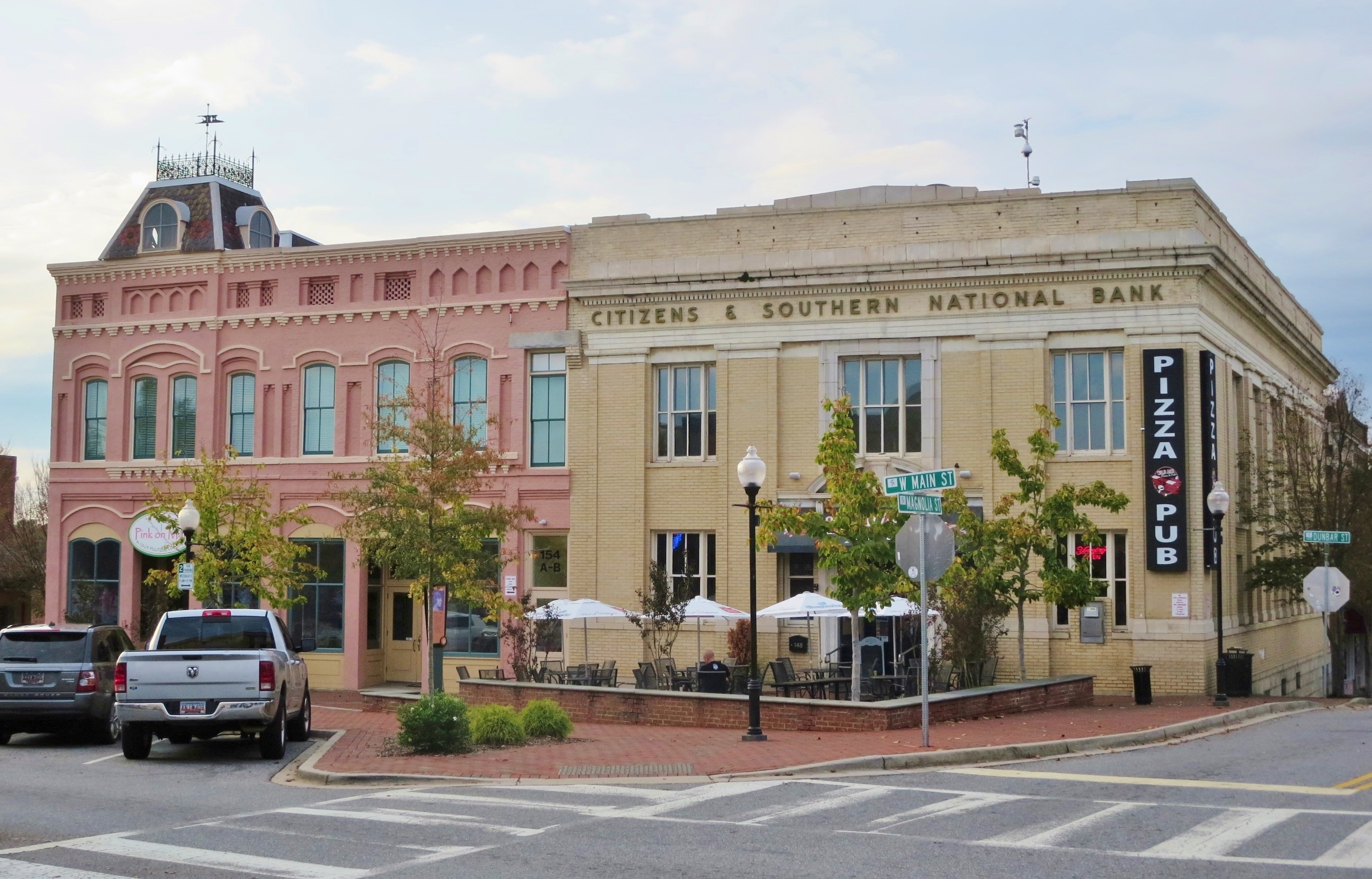
148-156 West Main Street

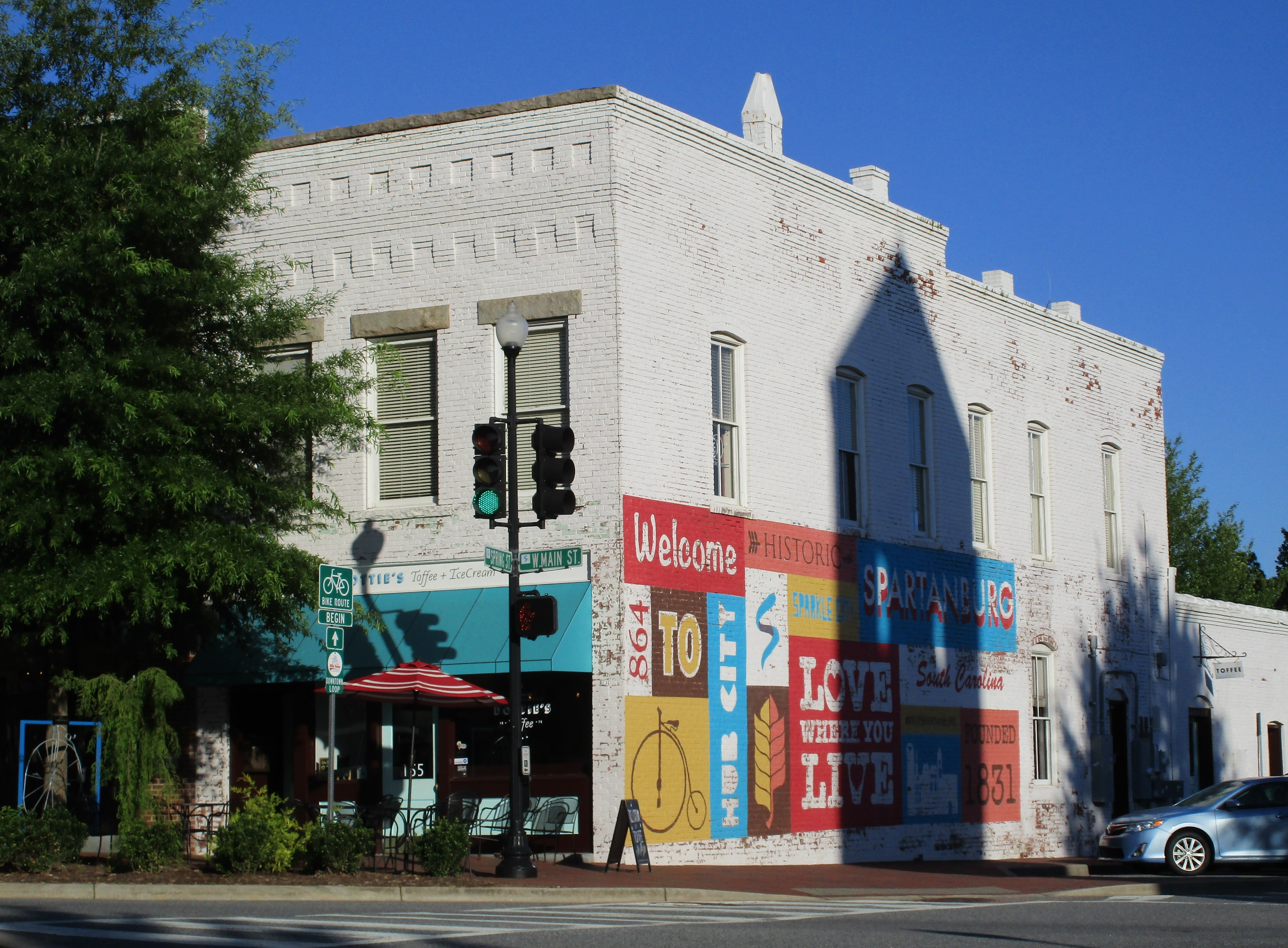
155 West Main Street

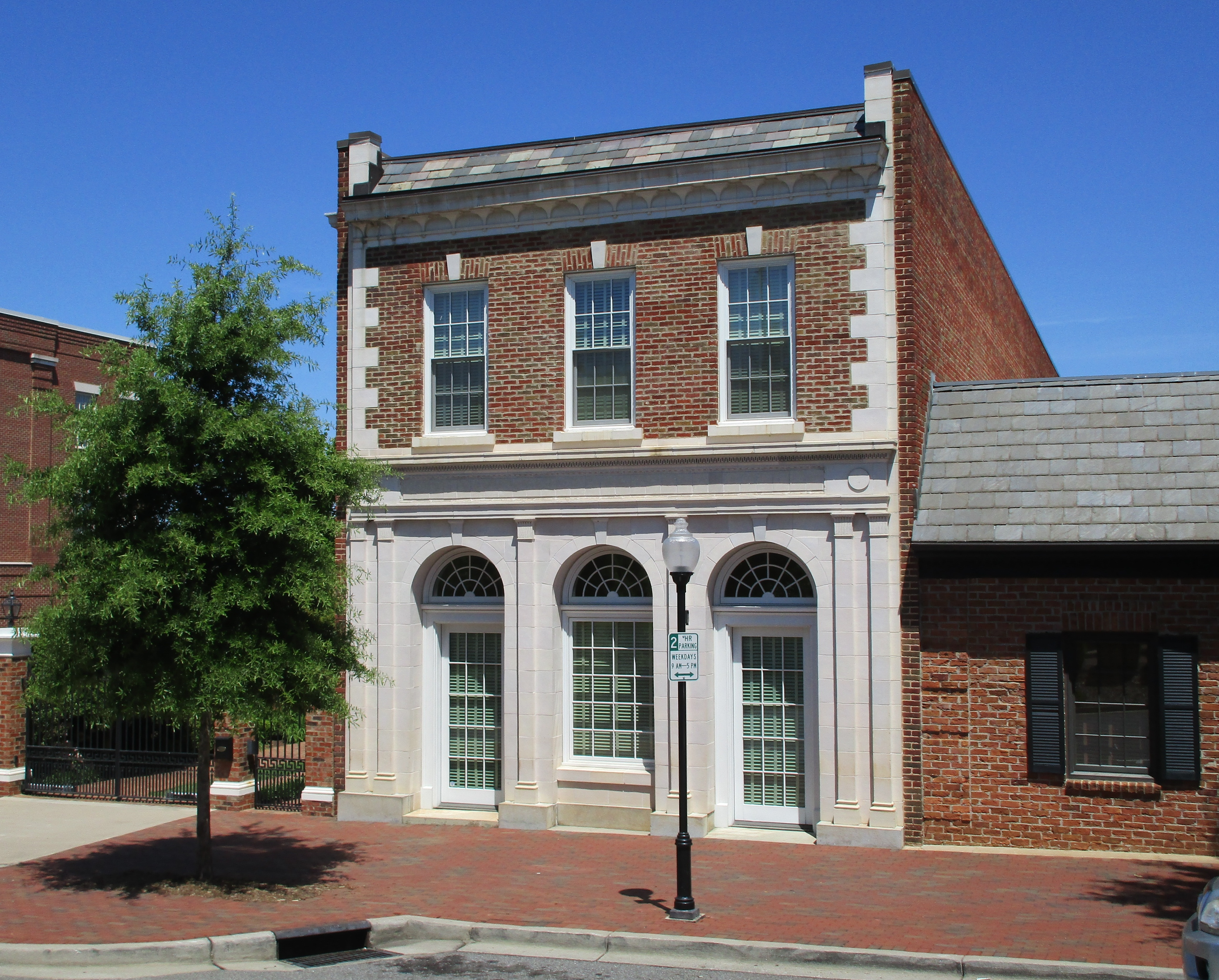
Waterworks building

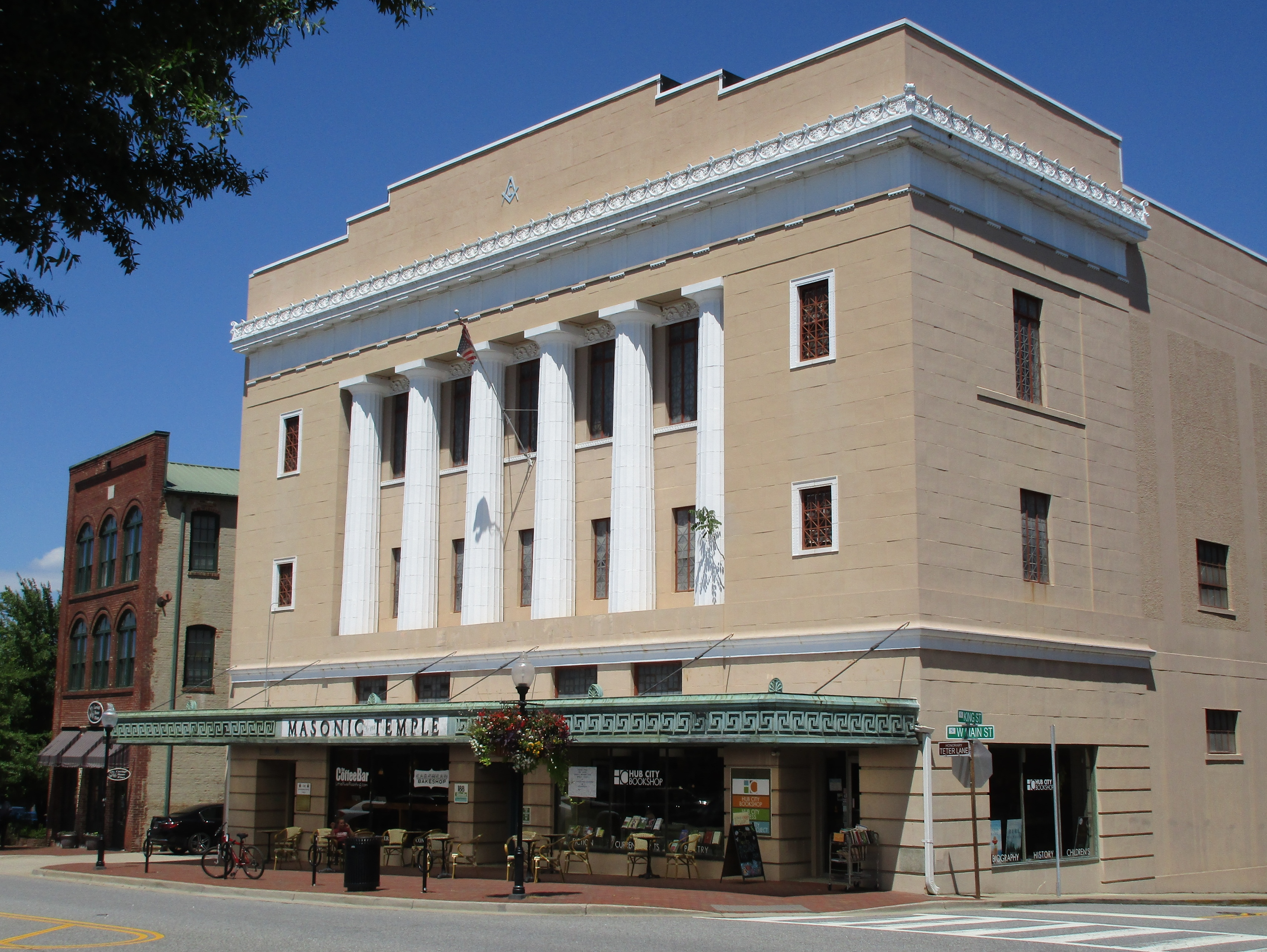
Masonic Temple and Cantrell Wagon building

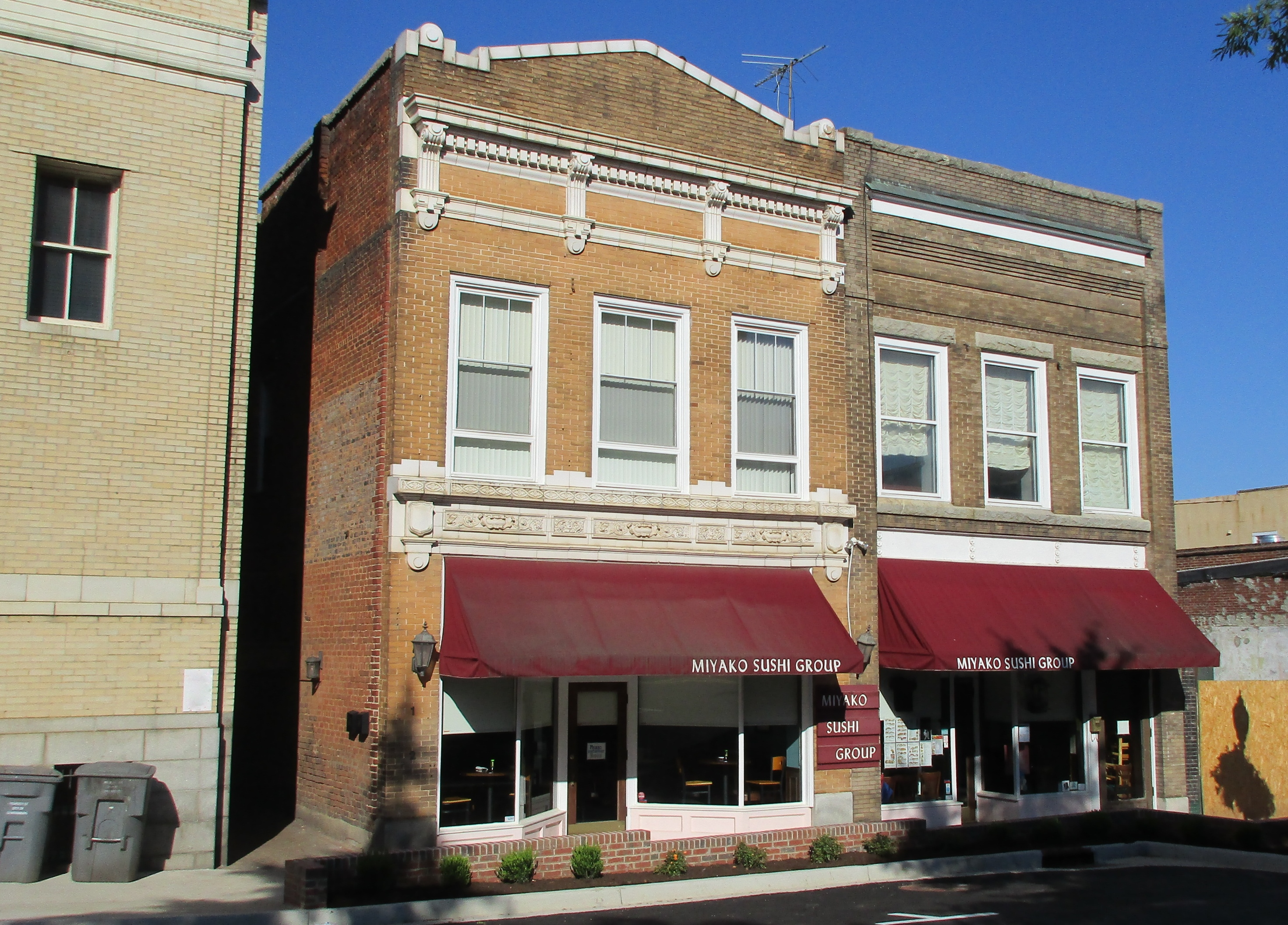
114-116 Magnolia Street

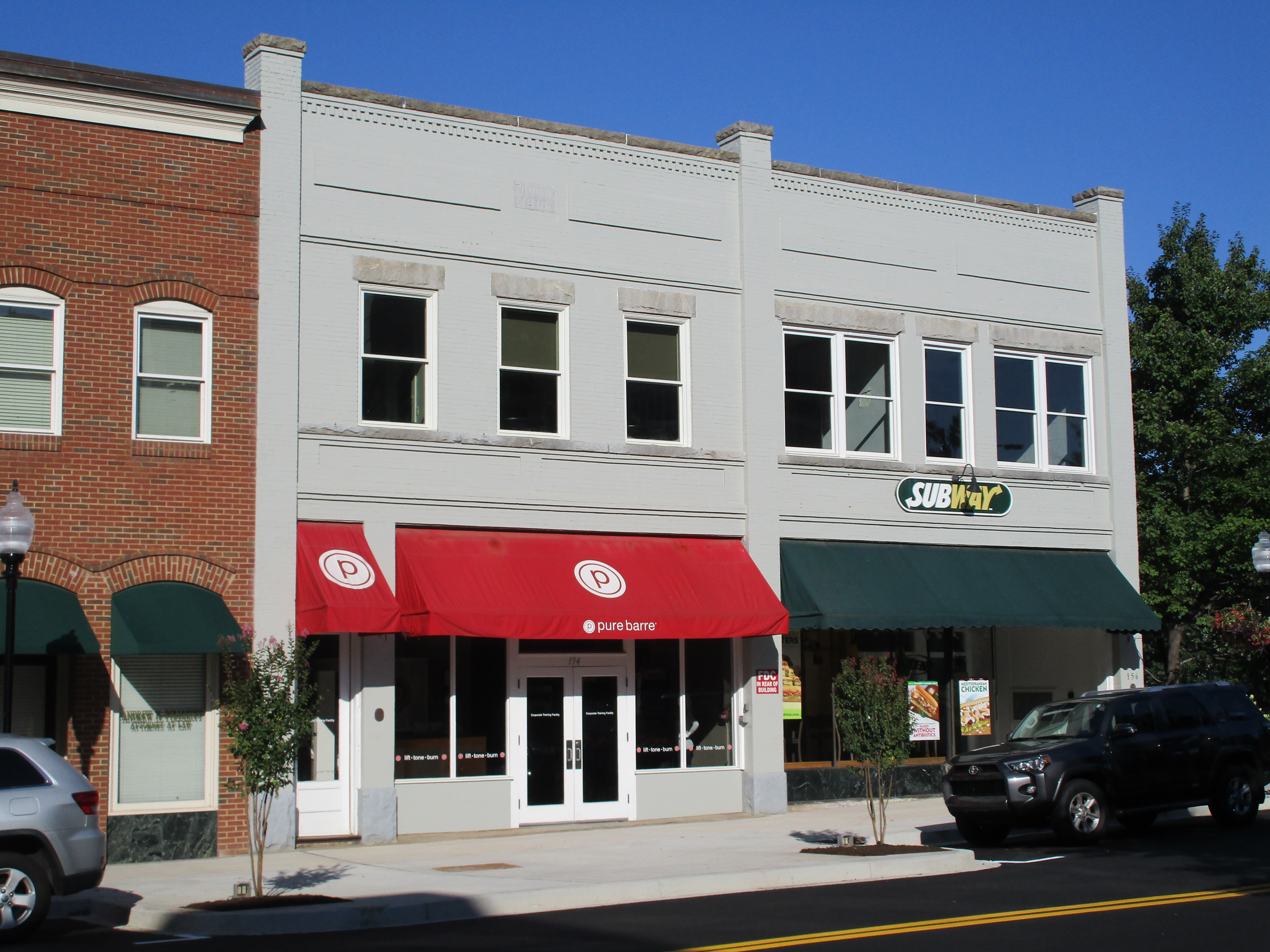
T.O. Monk buildings
