= S.H. Kress & Co. Building (Nogales, Arizona) =

- S. H. Kress & Co. Building
- U.S. National Register of Historic Places
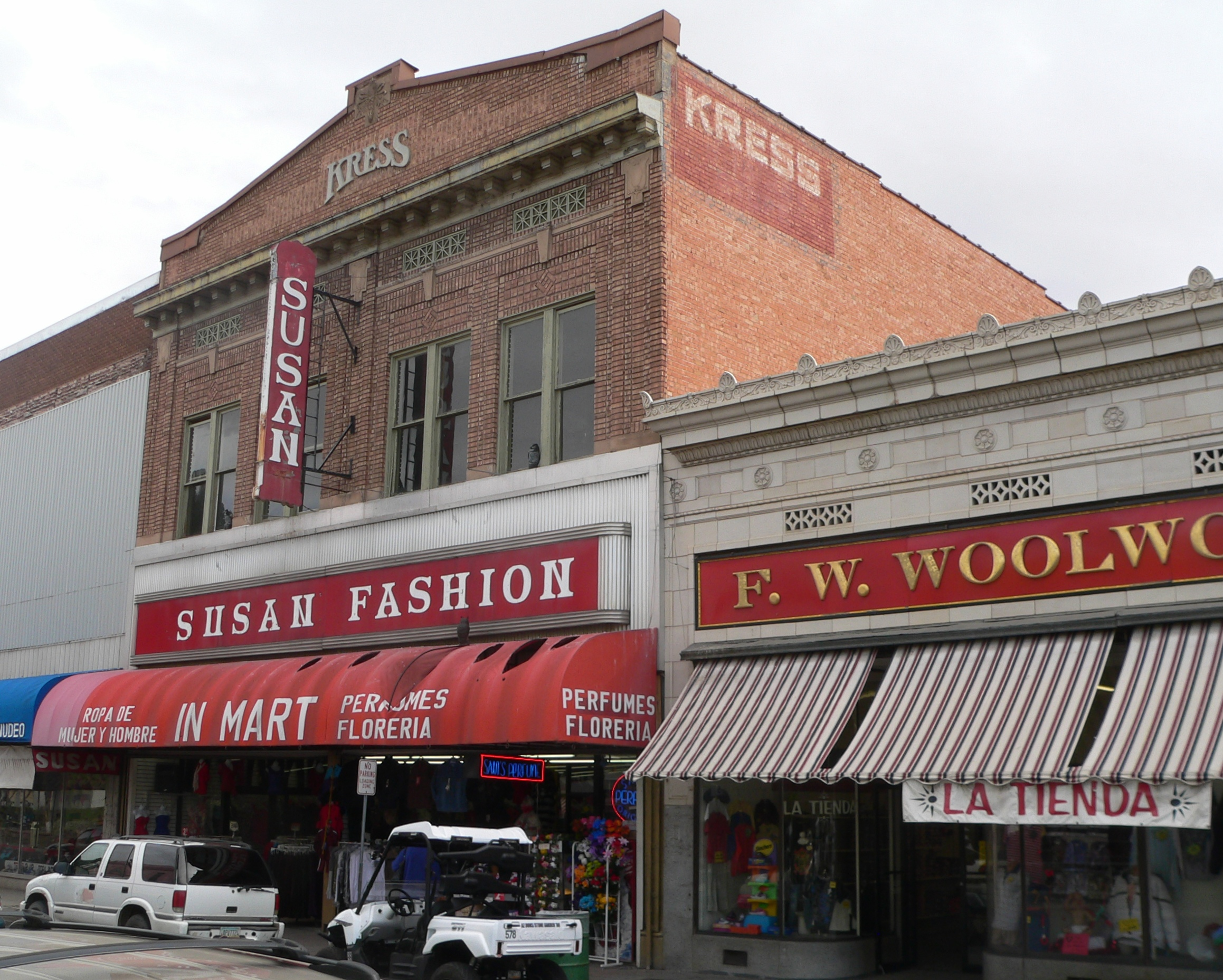
- Kress Building in 2012

- Location within Arizona Location within the United States
- Location: 48 North Morley, Nogales, Arizona
- Coordinates: 31°20′1″N 110°56′27″W
- Area: 0 acres (0 ha)
- Architectural style: Chicago, Commercial
- MPS: Nogales MRA
- NRHP reference No.: 85001859
- Added to NRHP: August 29, 1985

S. H. Kress, & Co. Building is a historic commercial building in Nogales, Arizona. Built sometime between 1917 and 1930, the building's stylized "Kress" on its pedimented parapet identifies its original use as part of the S. H. Kress & Co. chain of "five and dime" retail department stores.

The building is two story, fired brick, with cast stone keystones over flat arch windows and a pressed metal cornice. Aluminum signage has been added to the facade. Notable as an example of a brick commercial style building, it was added to the National Register of Historic Places in 1985. It now houses a local retail store.
