= Main Street Commercial District (Dothan, Alabama) =

Historic district in Alabama, United States

- U.S. National Register of Historic Places
- U.S. Historic district
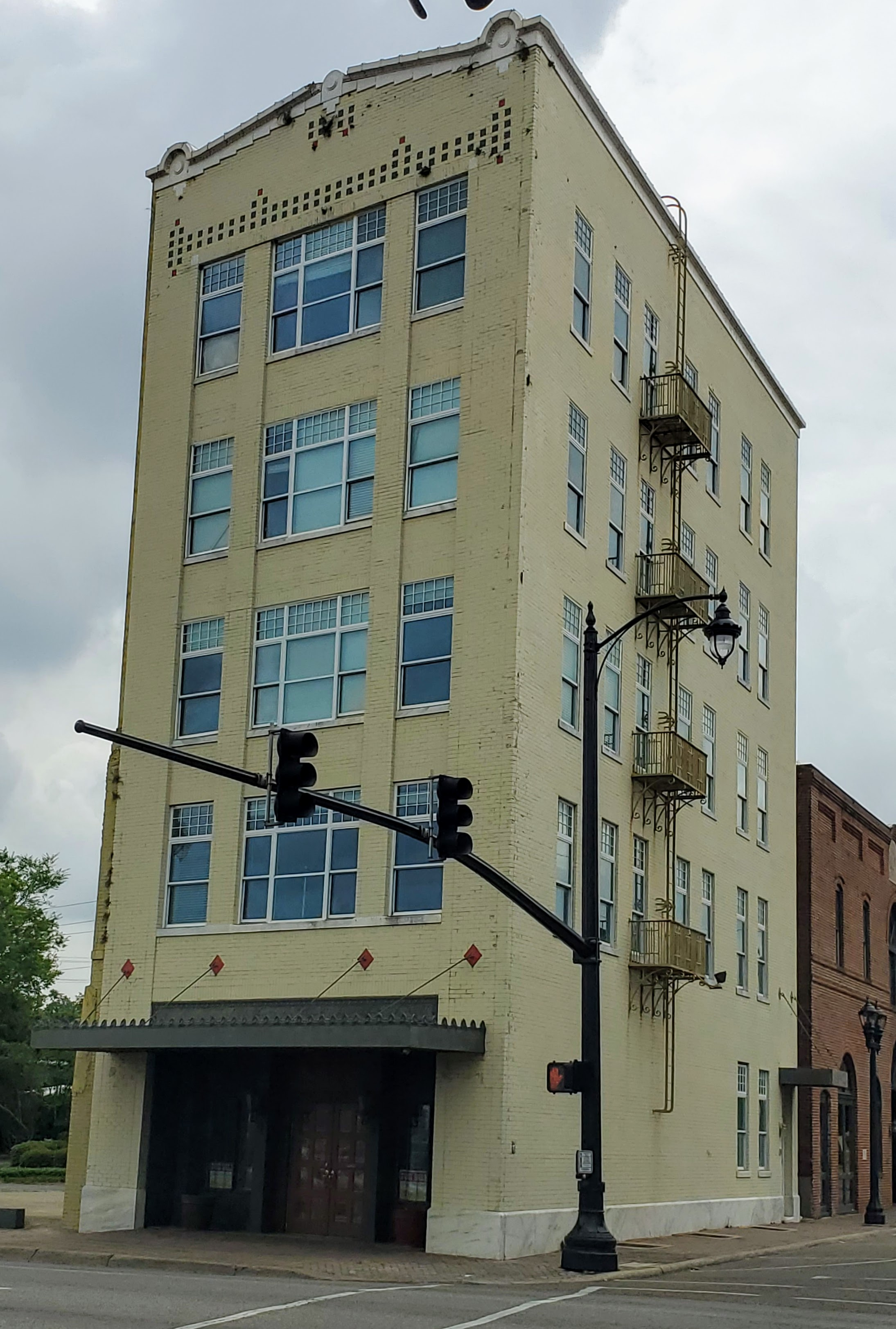
- Young Building - June 2021

- Location within Alabama Location within the United States
- Location: E. Main, Foster, St. Andrews, Crawford, and Troy Sts., Dothan, Alabama
- Coordinates: 31°13′24″N 85°23′31″W
- Area: 18 acres (7.3 ha)
- Built: 1885
- NRHP reference No.: 83002984
- Added to NRHP: April 21, 1983

The Main Street Commercial District is a historic district in Dothan, Alabama, United States. The district covers 18 acres (7 ha) and portions of six blocks in Dothan's historic commercial district. At the time of the nomination, it contained 68 contributing properties, however many have been demolished in the intervening years.

Dothan was founded on the site of Poplar Head Springs, which was an important crossroads in the Muscogee lands. Logging was the area's first major industry, but did not develop until after the Civil War. Settlers began building saw mills and blacksmith shops, and encouraged commercial development by donating land and bricks to new settlers. The town was incorporated in 1885, and began a period of great expansion with the coming of the Alabama Midland Railway in 1889. The oldest buildings in the district date from the 1900s, including the three-story Wadlington Hotel (built 1900, demolished 2012) and the Neoclassical First National Bank (1907). Several brick warehouses were also constructed along the railroad line. A symbol of the town's rapid growth, a five-story office building was completed in 1914.

Cotton had replaced lumber as the economic engine of the region, but the boll weevil outbreak of the 1910s sent Dothan into a recession. Fewer buildings date from beyond this period, including the Malone Motor Company Building (1923) and the Kress Building (1928). The importance of the downtown core declined after the 1960s, as retail establishments relocated to outlying areas.

The district was listed on the National Register of Historic Places in 1983.

== Gallery ==
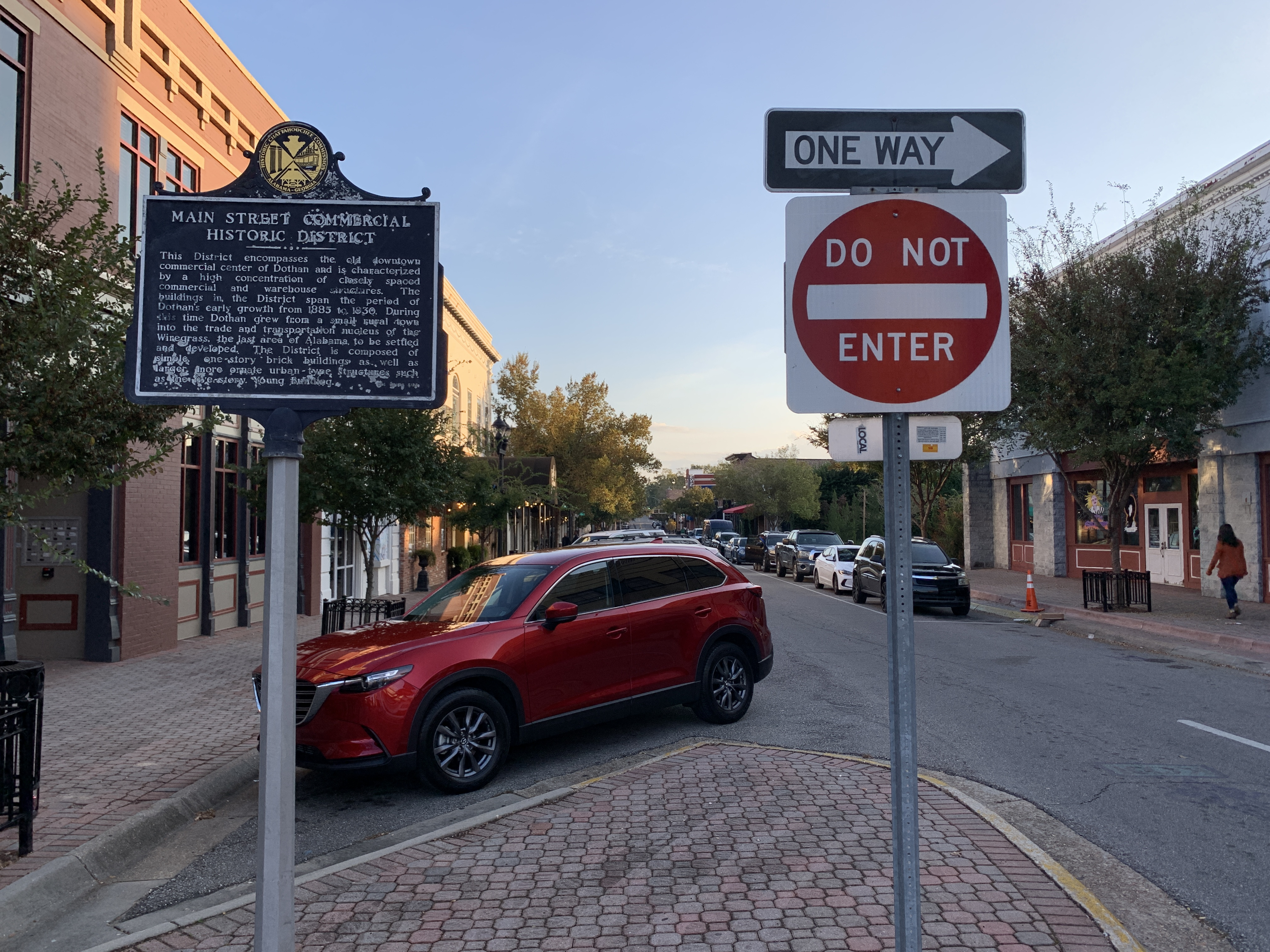
Main Street Historic District Historic Marker

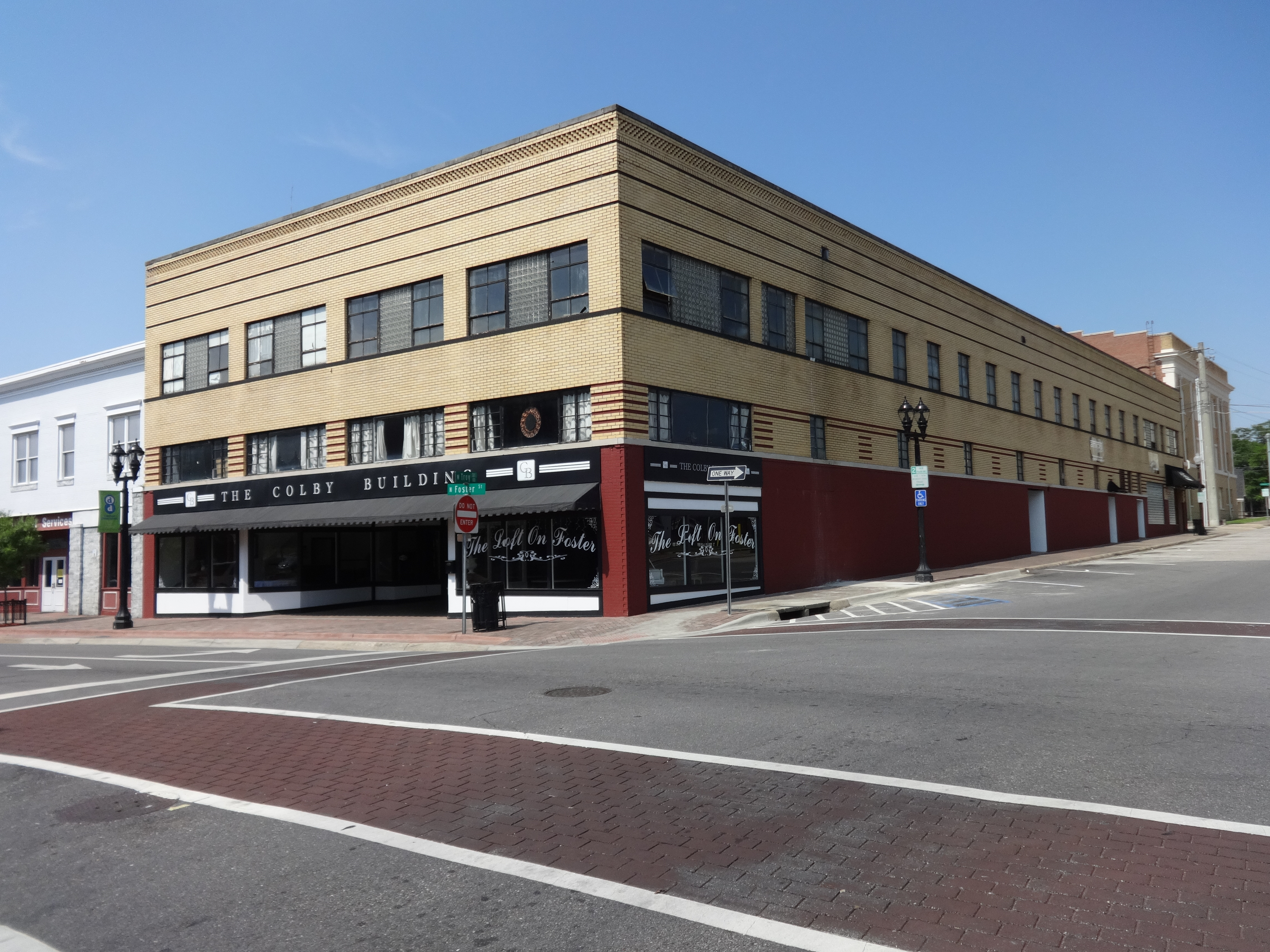
Colby Building

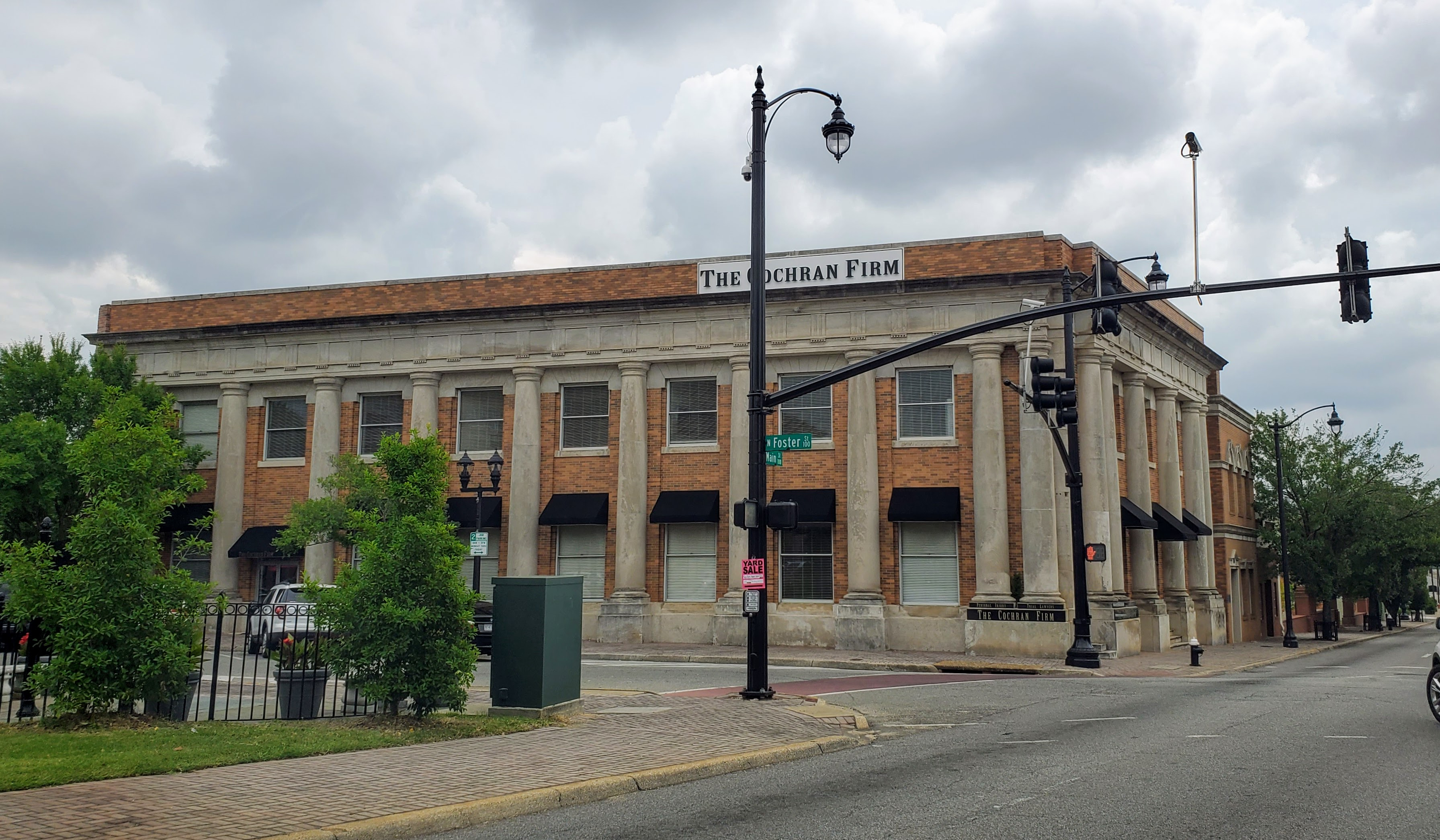
The First National Bank Building - June 2021
