= S. H. Kress and Co. Building (Columbia, Missouri) =

- Kress Building
- U.S. National Register of Historic Places
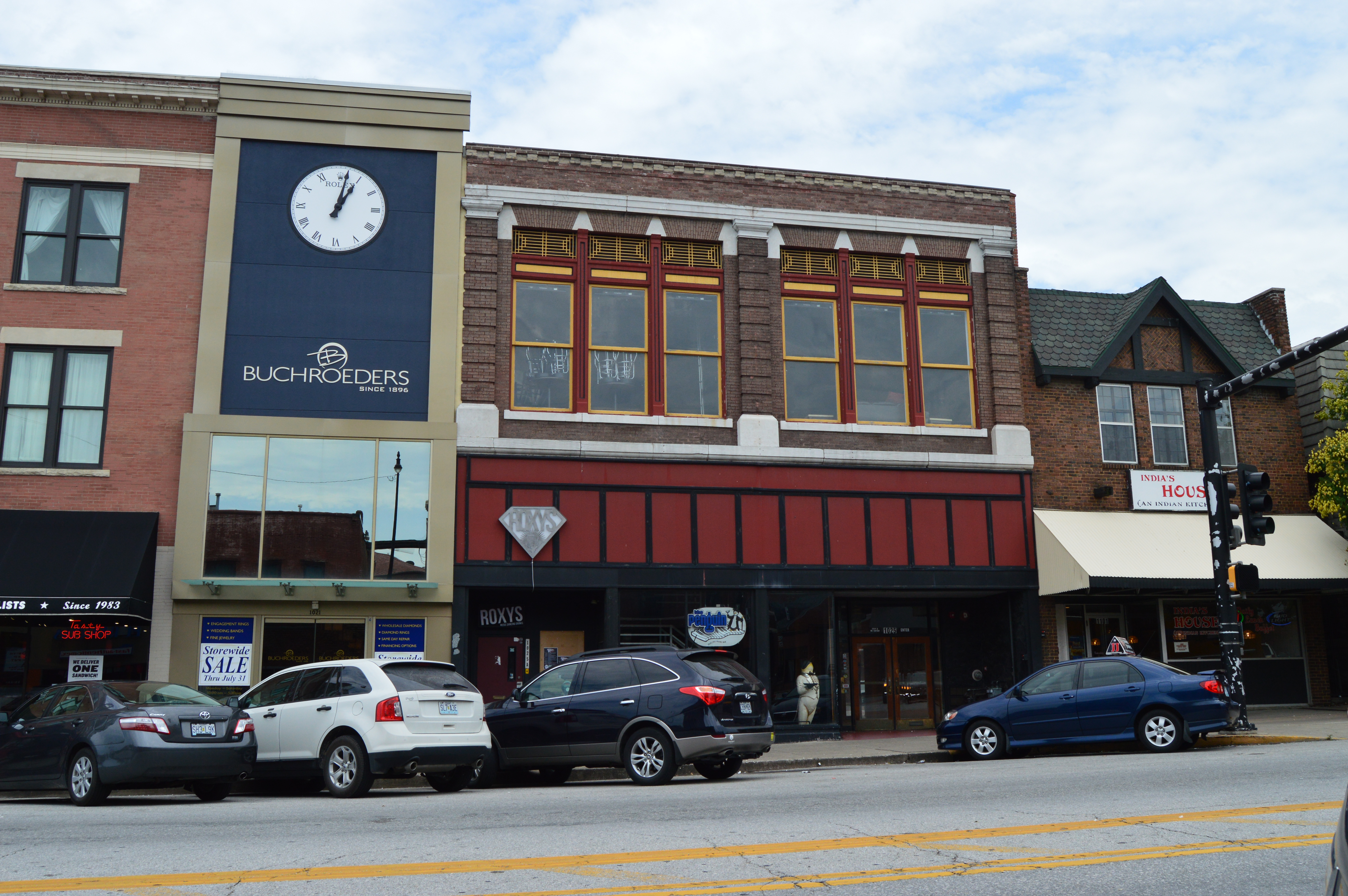

- Location within Missouri Location within the United States
- Location: 1025 E. Broadway, Columbia, Missouri
- Coordinates: 38°57′7″N 92°19′32″W
- Area: less than one acre
- Architect: likely Julius H. Zeitner and Seymour Burrell
- Architectural style: two-part commercial
- MPS: Downtown Columbia, Missouri MPS
- NRHP reference No.: 05000122
- Added to NRHP: March 9, 2005

The Kress Building, also known as Kress Wholesale Company Store and Mehornay Furniture Store, is a historic commercial building located in downtown Columbia, Missouri. It was built in 1910 for the S. H. Kress & Co., and remodeled in 1946 when it became Mehornay Furniture. It is a tall two-story, brick building with an open storefront topped by horizontal metal banding, that consists of large plate glass windows.

It operated as a furniture store from 1946 until 1979-80. It was again renovated in 2005. Post-renovation it became the home of the Penguin Piano Bar in 2005 on the ground floor and Roxy’s in 2015 on the 2nd floor. Both went out of business in 2020 due to the closures during the covid-19 pandemic.

It was listed on the National Register of Historic Places in 2005.
