= Kresge Building =

Kresge Building may refer to:

- Kresge Building (Augusta, Maine), listed on the National Register of Historic Places in Kennebec County, Maine
- Kresge Building (Boston, Massachusetts)
- Kresge Building (Detroit, Michigan)
- Kresge Building (Wilmington, Delaware), listed on the National Register of Historic Places in Sussex County, Delaware

== See also ==
- Kresge Auditorium, on the campus of the Massuchesetts Institute of Technology in Cambridge, Massachusetts
