= Edward Sibbert =

American architect

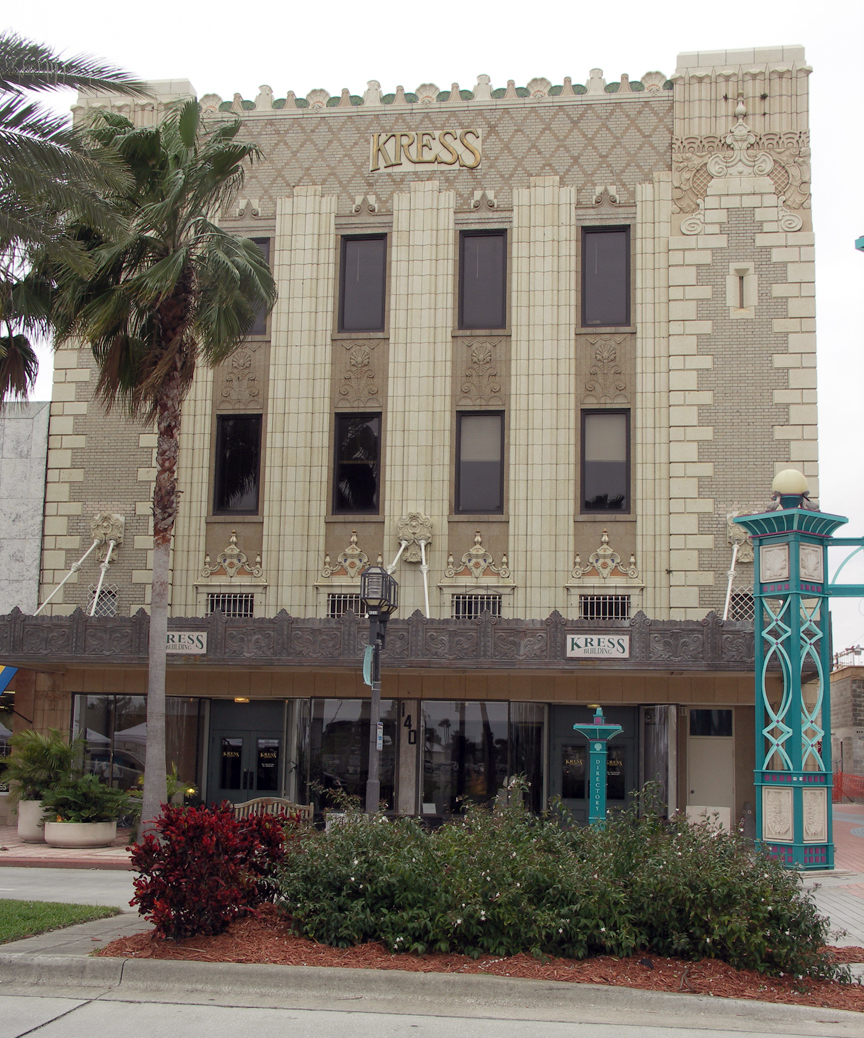
Sibbert-designed Kress Building in Daytona Beach, Florida

Edward F. Sibbert (July 1, 1889 – 1982) was a Brooklyn-born American architect. He is best remembered for the fifty or so retail stores he designed during a 25-year career as the head architect at the S. H. Kress & Co. chain of five-and-dimes. His tenure at Kress coincided roughly with the company's peak years of success, and many of his Art Deco-style buildings have survived beyond the chain's 1980 demise and are in use today in other purposes.

== Early years ==
Sibbert's architectural education began at the Pratt Institute (1919–20) where he studied structural engineering. This was followed by work at Cornell University (1921–22) in its architectural program, where he was tapped into the New York Alpha chapter of the Phi Kappa Psi fraternity, known for its artists and architects. Through that organization, he was a member of the Irving Literary Society. Following the end of his formal education he worked as a draftsman for W.T. Grant and Company, a dime store retail organization.

In 1924 Sibbert, along with Cornell classmate and fraternity brother Russell Pancoast, moved to Miami where Pancoast's grandfather John S. Collins was developing Miami Beach. It was the right place for an aspiring young architect: the great Florida land boom of the 1920s was in full swing, with some properties being bought and sold several times in one day. Then just when the bubble showed signs of imploding anyway, a serious hurricane in 1926 helped things along and all but ended the Miami building boom. So Sibbert and his wife Bertha left Florida and returned to Brooklyn, where he signed on as an architect for E. H. Faile.

== Architect for Kress ==
In 1929 Sibbert answered an advertisement in a newspaper and was hired by the S. H. Kress company. Samuel H. Kress was in the process of dismissing his head architect, George Mackay and it is possible that Sibbert worked with MacKay in designing the store for Pueblo, Colorado. Sibbert continued as Kress's chief architect for 25 years, designing chain stores across the United States in a consistent format and style, recognizable by its use of ornamental terra cotta.

Sibbert was a member of the American Institute of Architects and American Society of Civil Engineers as well as being a member of the Salmagundi Club in New York. He retired to Pompano Beach, Florida, after living for many years in New York City. Sibbert died in Pompano Beach on May 13, 1982.
