= Haywood v. National Basketball Association =

Haywood v. N.B.A.
- Supreme Court of the United States

Decided March 1, 1971
- Full case name: In re Spencer Haywood v. National Basketball Association
- Citations: 401 U.S. 1204 (more) 91 S. Ct. 672; 28 L. Ed. 2d 206

Holding
- Haywood was granted an injunction pendente lite which allowed him to play for Seattle and forbade the NBA to impose sanctions on the Seattle team.

Court membership
- Chief Justice Warren E. Burger Associate Justices Hugo Black · William O. Douglas; John M. Harlan II · William J. Brennan Jr. Potter Stewart · Byron White; Thurgood Marshall · Harry Blackmun

Case opinion
- Majority: Douglas
- All other justices took no part in the consideration or decision of the case.

Laws applied
- Sherman Antitrust Act

Haywood v. National Basketball Association, 401 U.S. 1204 (1971), was a U.S. Supreme Court decision that ruled against the NBA's requirement that a player could not be drafted by an NBA team until four years after graduating from high school. Justice Douglas, in an in-chambers opinion, allowed Spencer Haywood to play in the NBA temporarily until the litigation could proceed further. The case was settled out of court, Haywood continued playing, and the NBA modified its four-year rule to allow players to enter the league early in cases of "hardship".

== Background ==
Spencer Haywood turned pro after his sophomore season at the University of Detroit, joining the American Basketball Association’s (ABA) Denver Rockets in 1969. While both the NBA and the ABA required players to be at least four years removed from their high school graduation, the ABA offered a hardship exemption. With his mother raising 10 children while picking cotton at $2 per day (equivalent to about $17 per day in 2024), Haywood met the criteria.

Haywood led the ABA in scoring (30.0 per game) and rebounding (19.5 per game) in 1969-70, before jumping to the NBA the following season. Seattle SuperSonics owner Sam Schulman signed Haywood to a six-year, $1.5 million contract, ignoring the four-year rule. As a result, the NBA threatened to disallow the contract and implement various sanctions against the SuperSonics.

== Procedural history ==
Haywood challenged this decision by commencing an antitrust action against the NBA. As part of his claim against the NBA, Haywood argued that the conduct of the NBA was a "group boycott" and a violation of the Sherman Antitrust Act. The central issue that had to be determined was whether the NBA draft policy was a restraint on trade and therefore was illegal in accordance with the Sherman Act. Violations of the Sherman Antitrust Act had also previously played a factor with the NBA due to the league allowing for early talks of an NBA-ABA merger to follow suit in exchange for the ABA to drop a potential lawsuit on their end.

The case was filed in the United States District Court for the Central District of California, which issued an injunction in Haywood's favor, ruling:

If Haywood is unable to continue to play professional basketball for Seattle, he will suffer irreparable injury in that a substantial part of his playing career will have been dissipated, his physical condition, skills, and coordination will deteriorate from lack of high-level competition, his public acceptance as a super star will diminish to the detriment of his career, his self-esteem, and his pride will have been injured and a great injustice will be perpetrated on him.

The NBA appealed to the Ninth Circuit Court of Appeals, which stayed the injunction. Joined by the SuperSonics, Haywood appealed to the Supreme Court, which upheld the District Court, reinstated that court's injunction against the NBA, and remanded the case to the District Court for further proceedings.

== Impact ==
Shortly after the Supreme Court's decision, the league and Haywood reached an out-of-court settlement which allowed him to stay with the Sonics permanently.

The decision allowed a significant number of high school graduates and college attendees to make themselves eligible for the NBA draft without waiting until four years after high school. The ABA would also host a similar type of draft during this period of time called the "special circumstances draft" in 1971 and 1973 following the results of this case. The NBA would also allow for the "hardship draft" to exist under that nature for a few years before abolishing that effort by the 1976 NBA draft in relation to the NBA-ABA merger in exchange for allowing college underclassmen (and later, high school players during a certain period of time) to join the rest of the draft eligible players so long as they declare their intent to enter the draft and stay in it during the period of time they're allotted to before potentially being selected by a team of interest.

== See also ==
- List of United States Supreme Court cases, volume 401
- Toolson v. New York Yankees, 346 U.S. 356 (1953)
- Silver v. New York Stock Exchange, 373 U.S. 341 (1963)
- Robertson v. National Basketball Association 556 F.2d 682 (2nd Cir. 1977)
- Clarett v. National Football League, 369 F.3d 124 (2d Cir. 2004)
