= Adickes =

Adickes is a surname. Notable people with the surname include:

- David Adickes (1927–2025), American modernist sculptor and painter
- Erich Adickes (1866–1928), German philosopher
- Franz Adickes (1846–1915), German politician
- John Adickes (born 1964), American footballer
- Mark Adickes (born 1961), American footballer and physician
- Sandra Adickes (born 1933), American civil rights activist

== See also ==
- Adickes v. S. H. Kress & Co., a US Supreme Court case
