= Peterson v. City of Greenville =

- Supreme Court of the United States

Argued November 6–7, 1962 Decided May 20, 1963
- Full case name: Peterson v. City of Greenville
- Citations: 373 U.S. 244 (more) 15

Case history
- Prior: Supreme Court of South Carolina, State v. Randolph et al., 239 S.C. 79

Court membership
- Chief Justice Earl Warren Associate Justices Hugo Black · William O. Douglas; Tom C. Clark · John M. Harlan II; William J. Brennan Jr. · Potter Stewart; Byron White · Arthur Goldberg

Case opinion
- Majority: Harlan, joined by unanimous

Peterson v. City of Greenville, 373 U.S. 244, was a United States Supreme Court case that maintained the illegality of race-based segregation in public places. Ten African American student protesters were arrested and convicted in Greenville, South Carolina for attempting to purchase food at an S.H. Kress lunch counter. After the African American students arrived at the restaurant and sat at the lunch counter, the manager abruptly closed the store and instructed the protesters to leave. The manager and police argued that the protesters violated a state trespassing ordinance and were not arrested because of their race. While the Supreme Court of South Carolina maintained the students' guilt, the United States Supreme Court reversed the decision, citing that a "violation of the Fourteenth Amendment cannot be saved by attempting to separate the mental urges of the discriminators."

== Background ==
In the early 1960s, segregation in most public places in South Carolina was mandated by both by state law and city ordinance. A city of Greenville ordinance, 31-8, as amended in 1958 read, "It shall be unlawful for any person owning, managing or controlling any hotel, restaurant, cafe, eating house, boarding-house or similar establishment to furnish meals to white persons and colored persons in the same room, or at the same table, or at the same counter; provided." Non-violent protests against segregation in public places had intensified in Greenville in the early 1960s, including the Greenville Eight's sit-in at the city's public library and the sit-ins at local restaurants.

On August 9, 1960, fourteen African American high school students entered into a S.H. Kress Store in downtown Greenville, South Carolina. Many of the protestors were students of Sterling High School. When the protesters entered the restaurant and sat at a lunch counter designed for 59 people, the manager demanded that they leave, declaring the store closed and turning off the lights. The white patrons left the restaurant, but the African American protesters remained, refusing to leave. The manager instructed one of his employees to call the police. When the police arrived, the manager said that he asked the protesters to leave because the integration of public facilities was "contrary to local customs." The ten protesters who were over sixteen years of age were charged with trespassing; the four minors were not arrested. Each of the ten arrested were convicted and sentenced to either pay a $100 fine or serve 30 days in jail.

The store manager and the police admitted that the students were clean, well-dressed, and quiet. The manager stated that Negroes were invited to patronize all departments of S.H. Kress except for the lunch counter. The petitioners asserted that the state of South Carolina had denied them their First and Fourth Amendment rights to free speech and equal protection under the law respectively.

== Appealing the decision ==
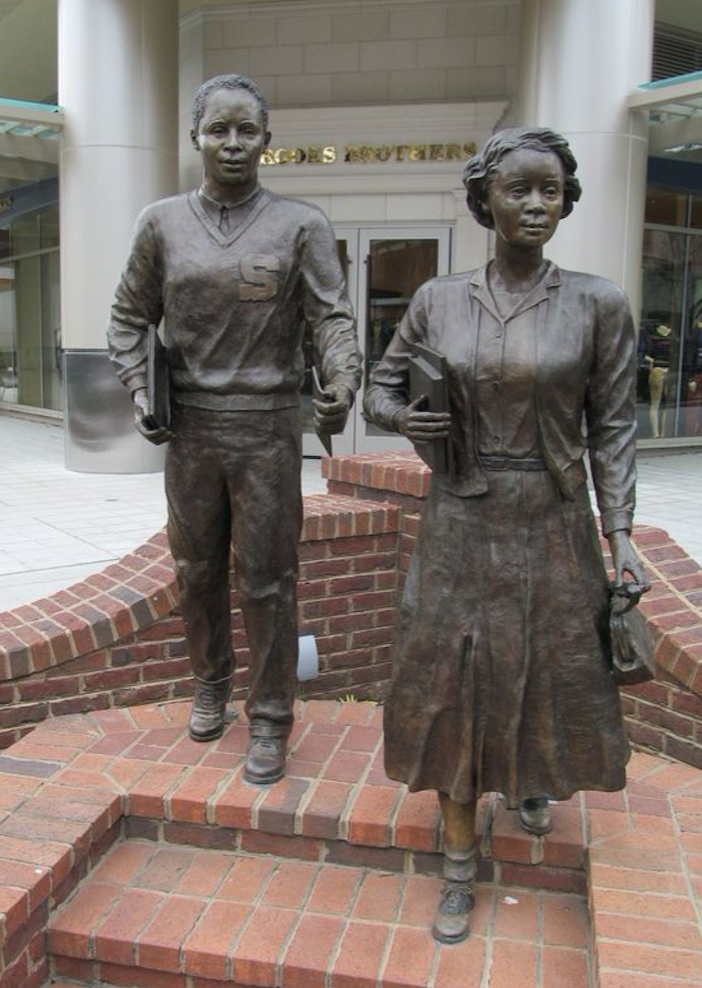
A statue dedicated to the nonviolent protests of students from Sterling High School, Greenville, SC.

The initial appeal to the Greenville County court was dismissed. In the case State v. Randolph et al., 239 S.C. 79, the defense argued that their arrest and conviction was not because of a trespassing violation but rather an effect of a custom of racial segregation. The defense appealed to the South Carolina Supreme Court.

The Supreme Court of South Carolina noted that the charge made no mention of a segregation-based law, citing the language of the trespassing ordinance: "Any person...who...fails and refuses, without good cause or excuse, to leave immediately upon being ordered or requested to do so by the person in possession, or his agent or representative." The state supreme court maintained that the reason the student protesters were arrested was because they were asked to leave, but remained on the premises. The court concluded that the arrest and conviction of the ten protesters was lawful and that the judgement was affirmed.

== Argument before the Supreme Court ==
Matthew Perry was the lead attorney for the defense, arguing a violation of the African American students' constitutional rights.

=== Decision ===
On May 20, the court decided unanimously that the arrest and conviction of the ten African American protesters was a violation of their Fourteenth Amendment rights and reversed the decision of the South Carolina Supreme Court.

Justice John Harlan authored the majority opinion, which was delivered by Chief Justice Earl Warren. In his opinion, Harlan wrote:

The evidence in this case establishes beyond doubt that the Kress management's decision to exclude petitioners from the lunch counter was made because they were Negroes. It cannot be disputed that under our decisions "private conduct abridging individual rights does no violence to the Equal Protection Clause unless to some significant extent the State in any of its manifestations has been found to have become involved in it." Burton v. Wilmington Parking Authority, 365 U.S. 715, 722; Turner v. City of Memphis, 369 U.S. 350 .

It cannot be denied that here the City of Greenville, an agency of the State, has provided by its ordinance that the decision as to whether a restaurant facility is to be [373 U.S. 244, 248] operated on a desegregated basis is to be reserved to it. When the State has commanded a particular result, it has saved to itself the power to determine that result and thereby "to a significant extent" has "become involved" in it, and, in fact, has removed that decision from the sphere of private choice. It has thus effectively determined that a person owning, managing or controlling an eating place is left with no choice of his own but must segregate his white and Negro patrons. The Kress management, in deciding to exclude Negroes, did precisely what the city law required.

Consequently these convictions cannot stand, even assuming, as respondent contends, that the manager would have acted as he did independently of the existence of the ordinance. The State will not be heard to make this contention in support of the convictions. For the convictions had the effect, which the State cannot deny, of enforcing the ordinance passed by the City of Greenville, the agency of the State. When a state agency passes a law compelling persons to discriminate against other persons because of race, and the State's criminal processes are employed in a way which enforces the discrimination mandated by that law, such a palpable violation of the Fourteenth Amendment cannot be saved by attempting to separate the mental urges of the discriminators. Reversed.

== See also ==
- Adickes v. S. H. Kress & Co.
- Greenville Eight
- African Americans in South Carolina
- South Carolina in the civil rights movement
