= Eleanor Jackson Piel =

American civil rights lawyer (1920–2022)

- Born: Eleanor Virden Jackson; September 22, 1920; Santa Monica, California, US
- Died: November 26, 2022 (aged 102); Austin, Texas, US
- Education: University of California, Los Angeles; University of California, Berkeley (BA, JD); University of Southern California
- Spouse: Gerard Piel (1955–2004)
- Children: 1
- Relatives: Serge Koussevitzky (cousin)

Eleanor Virden Jackson Piel (September 22, 1920 – November 26, 2022) was an American civil rights lawyer. She entered civil rights law after United States v. Masaaki Kuwabara, a case where interned Japanese Americans were tried for declining to be drafted. She practiced law until she was in her early 1990s.

== Education ==
Piel attended the University of California, Los Angeles and then transferred to University of California, Berkeley, graduating with a BA in 1940. She applied to the Berkeley law school, but was denied admission. She was told by the interviewing dean that "females always had nervous breakdowns". She attended the University of Southern California school of law for one year and then transferred to Berkeley where she graduated from in 1943. She was the only woman in the graduating class, and in 1970 she talked with the New York Times about the barriers women lawyers faced.

== Career ==
Piel clerked for Judge Louis Earl Goodman of the Federal District Court in San Francisco. In 1964, she represented Sandra Adickes in the case of Adickes v. S. H. Kress & Co. In 1999, she worked for ten years to free a man from Buffalo after DNA testing showed that he was innocent.

== Awards and honors ==
In 2013, Piel was awarded the Norman Redlich Capital Defense Distinguished Service Award from the Committee on Capital Punishment of the New York City Bar Association.

== Personal life and death ==
In 1955, Piel married Gerard Piel. Together they had a daughter. She Piel was born in Santa Monica, California. She died on November 26, 2022, at the age of 102.
