= Dorris Wright =

Civil rights activist

Dorris "DeeDee" Wright
- Born: Greenville, South Carolina
- Known for: Activism against segregation, one of the Greenville Eight
- Movement: Civil Rights Movement

Dorris "DeeDee" Wright is an American Civil Rights activist, and one of the Greenville Eight, who successfully protested the segregation of the Greenville Public Library in 1960.

== Activism ==
Born in Greenville, South Carolina, Wright's activism began when she was just a teenager. She was president of the State Youth Council of the NAACP Greenville Branch and served as secretary of the State Youth Council, and was arrested several times for civil disobedience at local sit-ins.

On July 16, 1960, eight Black students were arrested in Greenville, South Carolina, for reading in the "white's only" library. They came to be known as the Greenville Eight. These eight students were Jesse Jackson, Dorris Wright, Hattie Smith Wright, Elaine Means, Willie Joe Wright, Benjamin Downs, Margaree Seawright Crosby, and Joan Mattison Daniel. After a lawsuit was filed on the students' behalf, the Greenville City Council responded by closing all of their libraries. On September 19, 1960, as a direct result of the Greenville Eight's protest and a subsequent court ruling, the city of Greenville's public libraries were reopened and desegregated from that day forward.

Wright also helped organize statewide protests against segregation, including the State House demonstration in March 1961.

Wright was one of the plaintiffs in the landmark Edwards v. South Carolina decision, in which the Supreme Court ruled that the students had exercised constitutional rights in their public assembly and protest of segregation. The case is still an essential legal precedent for our rights of public assembly and protest.

While at Clark University, and serving as President of the Student Government Association, Wright and a group of students met with Coretta Scott King, and discussed their support for making Martin Luther King Jr.’s birthday a federal holiday. This student group was one of the first organizations to share their support for what would become Martin Luther King Jr. Day.

== Education and career ==
Wright earned a master’s degree in counseling and psychology from the University of Missouri and worked in non-profit and government social services, specializing in mental health care. After retiring to Salisbury, N.C., Wright served as the first African American chairwoman of the city’s planning board, as an executive community member of the NAACP, and as the interim director of Salisbury-Rowan Community Service Council.

Wright has received multiple awards and recognition for her activism work, including the NAACP’s Martin Luther King Humanitarian Award, Elizabeth Duncan Koontz Humanitarian Award, the University of Missouri’s Distinguished Alumna Award, and a Rainbow PUSH’s Freedom Fighter and Legacy Award.

In 2022, Wright published her memoir, The (W)right Thing: My Life in the Civil Rights Movement and Beyond, detailing her commitment to fighting for equality.

After the death of Reverend Jesse Jackson, Wright was interviewed and asked to share her memories of the late Jackson and their days as the Greenville Eight.
