= Celotex Corp. v. Catrett =

- Supreme Court of the United States

Argued April 1, 1986 Decided June 25, 1986
- Full case name: Celotex Corporation v. Catrett, Administratrix of the Estate of Catrett
- Citations: 477 U.S. 317 (more) 106 S. Ct. 2548; 91 L. Ed. 2d 265; 1986 U.S. LEXIS 118; 54 U.S.L.W. 4775; 4 Fed. R. Serv. 3d (Callaghan) 1024

Case history
- Prior: Cert. to the United States Court of Appeals for the District of Columbia Circuit

Holding
- A party moving for summary judgment show only that the opposing party lacks evidence sufficient to support its case.

Court membership
- Chief Justice Warren E. Burger Associate Justices William J. Brennan Jr. · Byron White; Thurgood Marshall · Harry Blackmun; Lewis F. Powell Jr. · William Rehnquist; John P. Stevens · Sandra Day O'Connor

Case opinions
- Majority: Rehnquist, joined by White, Marshall, Powell, O'Connor
- Concurrence: White
- Dissent: Brennan, joined by Burger, Blackmun
- Dissent: Stevens

Laws applied
- Rule 56(e) of the Federal Rules of Civil Procedure

Celotex Corp. v. Catrett, 477 U.S. 317 (1986), was a case decided by the United States Supreme Court. Written by Associate Justice William Rehnquist, the decision of the Court held that a party moving for summary judgment need show only that the opposing party lacks evidence sufficient to support its case. A broader version of that doctrine was later formally added to the Federal Rules of Civil Procedure.

Celotex was one of a "trilogy" of U.S. Supreme Court decisions on summary judgment issued in 1986, the other two being Anderson v. Liberty Lobby and Matsushita Electric Industrial Co. v. Zenith Radio Corp.. Within 20 years these three became the most-cited Supreme Court decisions in the U.S. federal court system.

== Case history ==
In September 1980, Catrett (respondent-plaintiff) sued fifteen asbestos manufacturers and distributors—including Celotex (petitioner-defendant)—in United States District Court for the District of Columbia, on the basis of evidence alleging that her husband, Louis H. Catrett, died in 1979 of health effects of exposure to asbestos manufactured or distributed by the defendants. Catrett sought recovery for claims arising from negligence, breach of warranty, and strict liability on the part of the defendant corporations.

Two of the defendants filed motions for dismissal for lack of personal jurisdiction. The district court granted the motions and the remaining thirteen defendant corporations including Celotex filed motions for summary judgment on other grounds. Celotex filed its motion in September 1981 and argued that summary judgment was proper because Catrett had failed to produce evidence that any of Celotex's products were the proximate cause of damages within the jurisdictional limits of the court. Celotex noted that in interrogatories, Catrett had failed to identify any witnesses who could testify to her husband's exposure to Celotex's products. Catrett then sought to enter into evidence three documents: a transcript of a deposition of decedent, a letter from one of decedent's former employers whom petitioner planned to call as a trial witness, and a letter from an official of an insurance company to Catrett's attorney. Catrett alleged that each of the documents tended to establish that the decedent had been exposed to Celotex's asbestos products in Chicago during 1970–1971. Celotex objected to the evidence, arguing that the three documents were hearsay and therefore could not be considered in opposition to Celotex's motion for summary judgment. The district court sustained Celotex's objection to the evidence.

The federal district court found that Catrett lacked evidence to show that she could prevail at trial on the basis of a preponderance of the evidence. Under Rule 56 of the Federal Rules of Civil Procedure, summary judgment, the case was dismissed. On appeal, the Court of Appeals for the District of Columbia Circuit reversed the district court's decision. Finally, the Supreme Court reversed the appeals court's decision and remanded the case.

== Issues ==
The issue of this case was whether petitioner-defendant Celotex Corp.'s attempted showing that the respondent-plaintiff had put forth inadequate evidence showing that her husband had been exposed to Celotex asbestos was a sufficient basis on which to grant summary judgment. Some have interpreted the decision as shifting the burden of proof for summary judgment from the moving party ("movant") to the respondent (facially challenging Adickes v. S.H. Kress Co. (1970), though the Court did not technically overrule Adickes, and in fact attempted to reconcile the Celotex decision with the former case). Celotex affirmed that the movant still must "show" the respondent does not have enough evidence to make out a prima facie case (for example, by pointing out specific discovery responses where the respondent admits a lack of evidence).

Respondent-plaintiff had argued that Celotex Corp.'s motion for summary judgment was insufficiently "supported," and that the moving party must provide affidavits. On this basis, the court of appeals reversed the decision to grant summary judgment for Celotex Corp., but the Supreme Court stated in its decision that affidavits were not necessary, as long as it demonstrated the lack of a genuine issue for trial.

Thus, according to the Celotex standard, the movant in a motion for summary judgment must show the absence of genuine factual issues in the nonmovant's case, although the movant is not required specifically to negate any aspects of his opponent's claims.

== See also ==
- List of United States Supreme Court cases, volume 477
- List of United States Supreme Court cases
- Lists of United States Supreme Court cases by volume
- List of United States Supreme Court cases by the Burger Court
