= White v. Maryland =

- Supreme Court of the United States

Decided April 29, 1963
- Full case name: White v. Maryland
- Citations: 373 U.S. 59 (more)

Holding
- A preliminary hearing where the defendant enters a plea is a critical stage in the criminal trial that attaches the Sixth Amendment right to counsel.

Court membership
- Chief Justice Earl Warren Associate Justices Hugo Black · William O. Douglas; Tom C. Clark · John M. Harlan II; William J. Brennan Jr. · Potter Stewart; Byron White · Arthur Goldberg

Case opinion
- Per curiam

Laws applied
- Sixth Amendment

White v. Maryland, 373 U.S. 59 (1963), was a United States Supreme Court case in which the Court held that a preliminary hearing where the defendant enters a plea is a critical stage in the criminal trial that attaches the Sixth Amendment right to counsel.

== Background ==
Arrested on a charge of murder, White was taken before a Maryland magistrate for a preliminary hearing, and he pleaded guilty without having the advice or assistance of counsel. Counsel was later appointed for him, and he pleaded not guilty at his formal "arraignment." White's earlier plea of guilt was not formally binding upon him, so the trial went forward. However, the fact of the plea of guilt made at the preliminary hearing was introduced in evidence at his trial, and he as convicted and sentenced to death.

Because White did not have counsel at the time of the preliminary hearing, he argued that Hamilton v. Alabama applied. The Court of Appeals of Maryland disagreed, saying that arraignment in Alabama is "a critical stage in a criminal proceeding" where rights are preserved or lost, while, under Maryland law, there was "no requirement (nor any practical possibility under our present criminal procedure) to appoint counsel" for petitioner at the "preliminary hearing... nor was it necessary for appellant to enter a plea at that time.

== Supreme Court ==
The Supreme Court held in a per curiam opinion that, under the facts of this case, the preliminary hearing was in this case as "critical" a state as an arraignment. The petitioner entered a plea before the magistrate, and that plea was taken at a time when he had no counsel. The case reaffirmed that the arraignment is a critical stage.

== Later developments ==
After White, a number of incarcerated people tried to collaterally attack their convictions based on the lack of representation at their preliminary hearings.
