= List of United States Supreme Court cases, volume 373 =

The following is a list of all United States Supreme Court cases from volume 373 of the United States Reports:

- Sanders v. United States, 373 U.S. 1 (1963)
- Locomotive Engineers v. Louisville & Nashville R. Co., 373 U.S. 33 (1963)
- Maximov v. United States, 373 U.S. 49 (1963)
- Hawaii v. Gordon, 373 U.S. 57 (1963) (per curiam)
- White v. Maryland, 373 U.S. 59 (1963) (per curiam)
- Johnson v. Virginia, 373 U.S. 61 (1963) (per curiam)
- A. L. Kornman Co. v. Pack, 373 U.S. 63 (1963) (per curiam)
- Foreman v. Bellefontaine, 373 U.S. 63 (1963) (per curiam)
- Halliburton Oil Well Cementing Co. v. Reily, 373 U.S. 64 (1963)
- Brady v. Maryland, 373 U.S. 83 (1963)
- Willner v. Committee on Character and Fitness, Appellate Div. of Supreme Court of N. Y., First Judicial Dept., 373 U.S. 96 (1963)
- Railway Clerks v. Allen, 373 U.S. 113 (1963)
- Florida Lime & Avocado Growers, Inc. v. Paul, 373 U.S. 132 (1963)
- Namet v. United States, 373 U.S. 179 (1963)
- Whipple v. Commissioner, 373 U.S. 193 (1963)
- Gutierrez v. Waterman S. S. Corp., 373 U.S. 206 (1963)
- NLRB v. Erie Resistor Corp., 373 U.S. 221 (1963)
- Smith v. Mississippi, 373 U.S. 238 (1963) (per curiam)
- Shott v. Ohio, 373 U.S. 240 (1963) (Appeal from the Supreme Court of Ohio. Certiorari denied, appeal dismissed; per curiam.)
- Flora Constr. Co. v. Grand Junction Steel Fabricating Co., 373 U.S. 240 (1963) (per curiam)
- Abernathy v. Carpenter, 373 U.S. 241 (1963) (per curiam)
- George v. Clemmons, 373 U.S. 241 (1963) (per curiam)
- Boyes v. United States, 373 U.S. 242 (1963) (per curiam)
- Copenhaver v. Bennett, 373 U.S. 242 (1963) (per curiam)
- Baker v. United States, 373 U.S. 243 (1963) (per curiam)
- Clark v. Pennsylvania, 373 U.S. 243 (1963) (per curiam)
- Peterson v. City of Greenville, 373 U.S. 244 (1963)
- Shuttlesworth v. Birmingham, 373 U.S. 262 (1963)
- Lombard v. Louisiana, 373 U.S. 267 (1963)
- Wright v. Georgia, 373 U.S. 284 (1963)
- Wisconsin v. FPC, 373 U.S. 294 (1963)
- Andrews v. United States, 373 U.S. 334 (1963)
- Silver v. New York Stock Exchange, 373 U.S. 341 (1963)
- Baltimore & Ohio R. Co. v. Boston & Maine R. Co., 373 U.S. 372 (1963) (per curiam)
- Gober v. Birmingham, 373 U.S. 374 (1963) (per curiam)
- Avent v. North Carolina, 373 U.S. 375 (1963) (per curiam)
- Ship-By-Truck Co. v. United States, 373 U.S. 376 (1963) (per curiam)
- Richards v. Pennsylvania, 373 U.S. 376 (1963) (per curiam)
- Atwood's Transport Lines, Inc. v. United States, 373 U.S. 377 (1963) (per curiam)
- Drexel v. Ohio Pardon and Parole Comm'n, 373 U.S. 377 (1963) (per curiam)
- Illinois v. United States, 373 U.S. 378 (1963) (per curiam)
- Sperry v. Florida ex rel. Florida Bar, 373 U.S. 379 (1963)
- United States v. Braverman, 373 U.S. 405 (1963)
- Reed v. The Yaka, 373 U.S. 410 (1963)
- Norvell v. Illinois, 373 U.S. 420 (1963)
- Lopez v. United States, 373 U.S. 427 (1963)
- Boesche v. Udall, 373 U.S. 472 (1963)
- Campbell v. United States, 373 U.S. 487 (1963)
- Haynes v. Washington, 373 U.S. 503 (1963)
- Watson v. Memphis, 373 U.S. 526 (1963)
- Hathaway v. Texas, 373 U.S. 540 (1963) (per curiam)
- Yale Transport Corp. v. United States, 373 U.S. 540 (1963) (per curiam)
- Food Fair Stores, Inc. v. Zoning Bd. of Appeals of Pompano Beach, 373 U.S. 541 (1963) (per curiam)
- Mile Road Corp. v. Boston, 373 U.S. 541 (1963) (per curiam)
- Gonzalez v. Chicago, 373 U.S. 542 (1963) (per curiam)
- Milne v. Rhode Island, 373 U.S. 542 (1963) (per curiam)
- Buffington v. Wainwright, 373 U.S. 543 (1963) (per curiam)
- Counts v. Counts, 373 U.S. 543 (1963) (per curiam)
- Smith v. Kansas, 373 U.S. 544 (1963) (per curiam)
- Cepero v. United States, 373 U.S. 544 (1963) (per curiam)
- Alabama v. United States, 373 U.S. 545 (1963) (per curiam)
- Cepero v. United States Congress, 373 U.S. 545 (1963) (per curiam)
- Arizona v. California, 373 U.S. 546 (1963)
- Wheeldin v. Wheeler, 373 U.S. 647 (1963)
- McNeese v. Board of Ed. for Community Unit School Dist. 187, 373 U.S. 668 (1963)
- Goss v. Board of Ed. of Knoxville, 373 U.S. 683 (1963)
- Plumbers v. Borden, 373 U.S. 690 (1963)
- Iron Workers v. Perko, 373 U.S. 701 (1963)
- United States v. Carlo Bianchi & Co., 373 U.S. 709 (1963)
- Rideau v. Louisiana, 373 U.S. 723 (1963)
- NLRB v. General Motors Corp., 373 U.S. 734 (1963)
- Retail Clerks v. Schermerhorn (Schermerhorn I), 373 U.S. 746 (1963)
- Jones v. Healing, 373 U.S. 758 (1963) (per curiam)
