= Florida Lime & Avocado Growers, Inc. v. Paul =

- Supreme Court of the United States

Argued January 8, 1963 Decided May 13, 1963
- Full case name: Florida Lime & Avocado Growers, Inc., et al. v. Paul, Director of the Department of Agriculture of California, et al.
- Citations: 373 U.S. 132 (more) 83 S. Ct. 1210; 10 L. Ed. 2d 248; 1963 U.S. LEXIS 1617

Case history
- Prior: Complaint dismissed, Fla. Lime & Avocado Growers, Inc. v. Jacobsen, 169 F. Supp. 774 (N.D. Cal. 1958), reversed, 362 U.S. 73 (1960); injunction denied on remand, Fla. Lime & Avocado Growers, Inc. v. Paul, 197 F. Supp. 780 (N.D. Cal. 1961); probable jurisdiction noted, 368 U.S. 964 (1962).
- Subsequent: Rehearing denied, 374 U.S. 858 (1963).

Holding
- California Agricultural Code § 792 neither violates the Supremacy Clause nor the Equal Protection Clause.

Court membership
- Chief Justice Earl Warren Associate Justices Hugo Black · William O. Douglas; Tom C. Clark · John M. Harlan II; William J. Brennan Jr. · Potter Stewart; Byron White · Arthur Goldberg

Case opinions
- Majority: Brennan, joined by Warren, Harlan, Stewart, Goldberg
- Dissent: White, joined by Black, Douglas, Clark

Florida Lime & Avocado Growers, Inc. v. Paul, 373 U.S. 132 (1963), was a 1963 decision of the United States Supreme Court in which the Court declined to invalidate a California law that imposed minimum fat content standards on avocados sold in the state, including those imported from other states. The law prohibited the sale of avocados that did not contain at least 8% oil by weight. Florida, a major avocado producer, employed, for wholesale marketing purposes, a federal standard unrelated to oil content. Most Florida avocados that were marketable at home failed to meet the California standard, because they were a different variety from those sold in California, with a lower fat content. Accordingly, Florida avocado growers brought this suit, arguing (unsuccessfully) that the California law (1) was preempted by federal law, (2) violated equal protection, and (3) unduly burdened and interfered with their right to engage in interstate commerce. The case is widely used in law school casebooks on constitutional law and federal jurisdiction as illustrative of preemption issues.

== Background ==
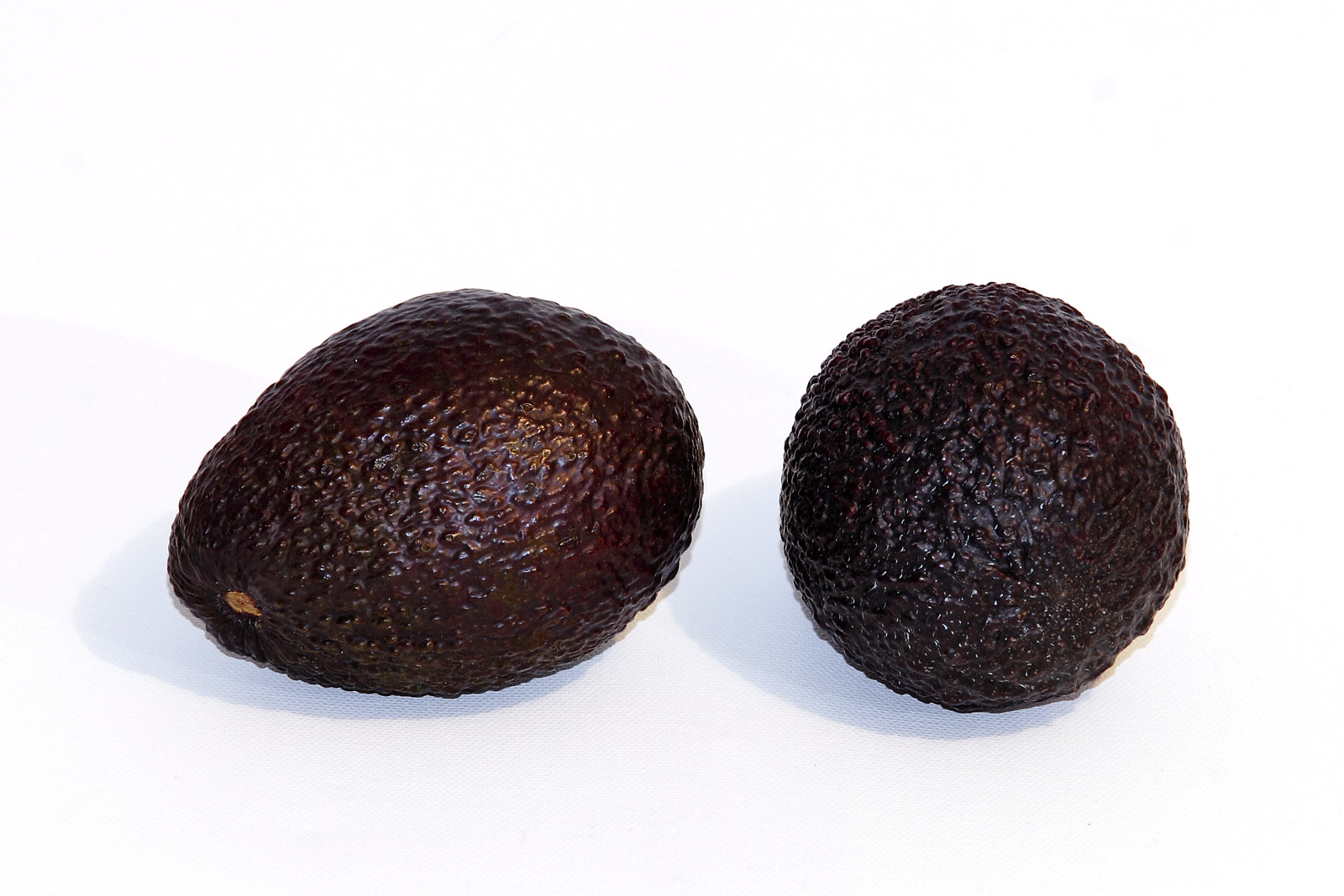
California avocado (Haas)

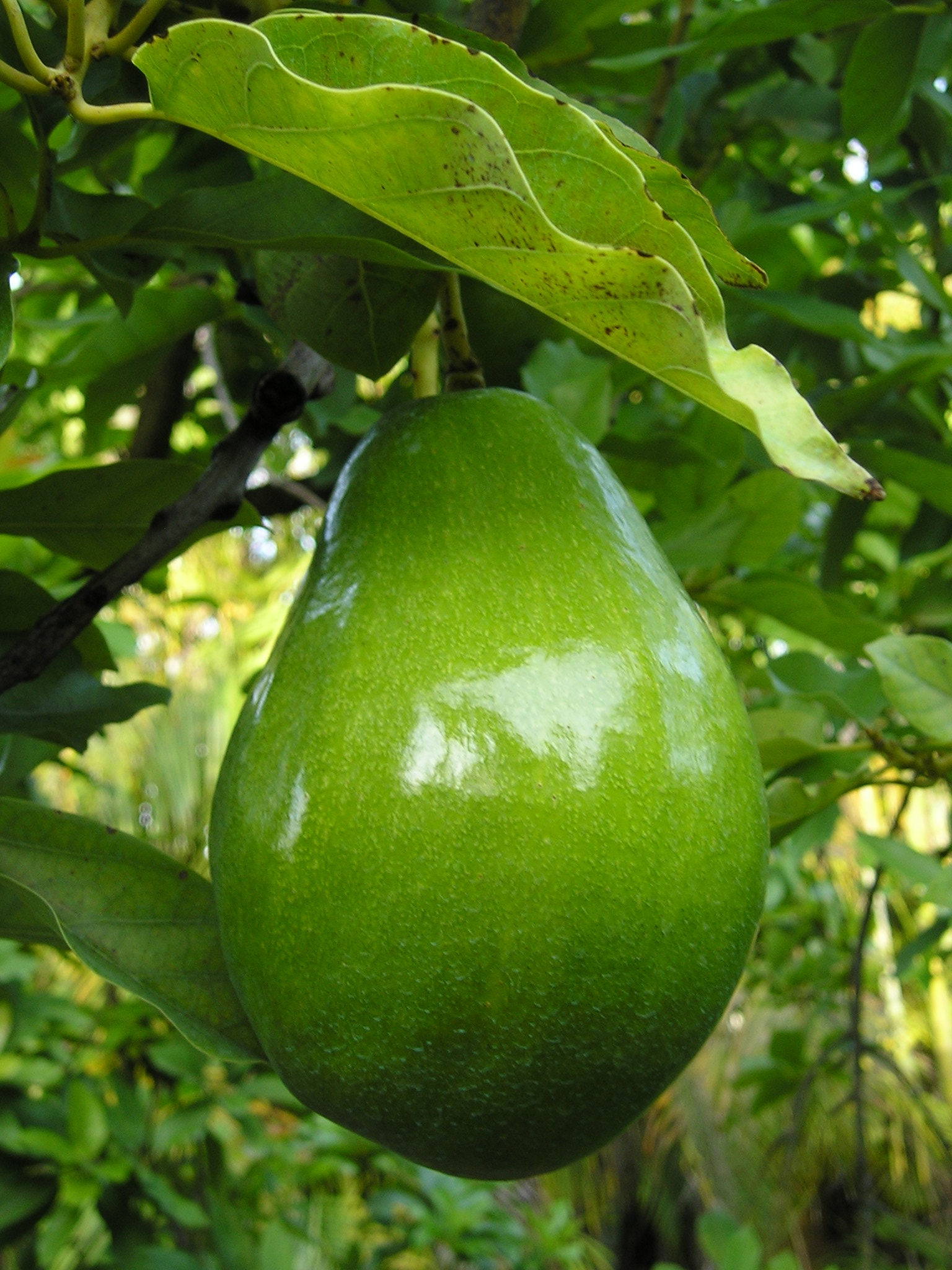
Florida avocado (West Indian)

This is a comparison of a West Indian avocado (left) with a Mexican avocado (right) – human hand shows sizes.

There are three principal races or groups of avocado: Mexican, Guatemalan and West Indian, named for the areas where they were originally cultivated. Mexican avocados have foliage with an anise scent and small fruits about the size of a plum, with black or purple smooth skin. Guatemalan avocados have larger, blackish-green, rough-skinned fruits. The West Indian avocado has the largest fruits, up to 2 lbs (1 kg), with smooth light green skin. Mexican avocados have the highest oil content; West Indian the lowest. The important cultivars now in commercial production are mostly hybrids between these three original races.

In 1925, California enacted a law requiring that "all avocados, at the time of picking, and at all times thereafter, shall contain not less than 8 percent of oil, by weight of the avocado excluding the skin and seed." In 1925, practically all the avocados in the United States came from California. The purpose of this legislation was to prevent the marketing of immature avocados, which never ripen properly, but decay or shrivel up and become rubbery and unpalatable. The effect of marketing immature avocados is to antagonize consumers; this increases future sales resistance against buying avocados.

In 1925, most of the avocados grown in California were, as they are at the present time, from trees derived from Mexican varieties (e.g. Haas avocados). Such avocados contain at least 8% oil when mature. The Florida avocado growers, however, mostly cultivate West Indian, Guatemalan, and hybrid varieties, which may reach maturity and be acceptable and reach their prime for marketing prior to reaching an 8% oil content, or they may never reach that level of oil content. All members of the Court agreed that there is no health issue; the question is "a purely economic one."

The Florida avocado growers objected to the California law because it severely restricts the access of Florida growers to the California market.

While California's avocado maturity standard is provided by statute, Florida's is set by a marketing order under the Agricultural Adjustment Act (AAA), a New Deal measure creating a regime of self-government for farmers, designed to "promote orderly competition among the South Florida growers" of avocados. The marketing orders for avocados are drafted by the South Florida Avocado Administrative Committee, which consists entirely of representatives of the growers concerned. The Secretary of Agriculture invariably adopts the committee's recommendations for avocado maturity dates, sizes, and weights.

=== Proceedings in district court ===
Because the Florida avocado growers sued to enjoin the enforcement against them of the California law because it was unconstitutional, the case was brought before a three-judge district court. The growers challenged the constitutionality of the statute on three grounds:

(1) that, under the Supremacy Clause, the California standard must be deemed displaced by the federal standard for determining the maturity of avocados grown in Florida;
(2) that the application of the California statute to Florida-grown avocados denied appellants the Equal Protection of the Laws, in violation of the Fourteenth Amendment; and
(3) that its application unreasonably burdened or discriminated against interstate marketing of Florida-grown avocados in violation of the Commerce Clause.

At the initial stage of the case, the three-judge district court dismissed the case on jurisdictional grounds, finding that there was not a current justiciable case or controversy. On direct appeal, the Supreme Court held that the suit was one for a three-judge court and presented a justiciable controversy to be tried on the merits.

After a trial, the three-judge court denied an injunction against the enforcement of § 792 on the ground that the proofs did not establish that its application to Florida avocados violated any provision of the Federal Constitution. The District Court held for several reasons that the Supremacy Clause did not operate to displace § 792: (1) no actual conflict existed between the statute and the federal marketing orders; (2) neither the AAA nor the marketing orders occupied the field to the exclusion of the state statute, and (3) Congress had not ordained that a federal marketing order was to give a license to Florida producers to "market their avocados without further inspection by the states" after compliance with the federal maturity test.

Rather, the court observed, "[t]he Federal law does not cover the whole field of interstate shipment of avocados," but, by necessary implication, leaves the regulation of certain aspects of their distribution to the States. Further, the District Court found no violation of the Equal Protection Clause, because the California statute was applicable on identical terms to Florida and California producers, and was reasonably designed to enforce a traditional and legitimate interest of the State of California in the protection of California consumers. The District Court concluded, finally, that § 792 did not unreasonably burden or discriminate against interstate commerce in out-of-state avocados—that the 8% oil content test served, in practice, only to keep off California grocers' shelves fruit which was unpalatable because prematurely picked. This holding rested, in part, on the conclusion that mature Florida fruit had not been shown to be incapable of attaining 8% oil content, since only a small fraction of Florida avocados of certain varieties in fact failed to meet the California test.

Both parties then appealed to the Supreme Court.

== Ruling of the Supreme Court ==
=== Majority opinion ===
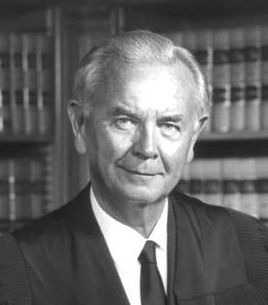
Justice Brennan delivered the majority opinion

Justice William J. Brennan delivered the 5-4 opinion of the Court, joined by Chief Justice Earl Warren, and Justices John Marshall Harlan II, Potter Stewart, and Arthur J. Goldberg.

==== Supremacy Clause issues ====
The Florida avocado growers' main challenge was under the Supremacy Clause, because some avocados that satisfy the standard set by the AAA marketing order do not satisfy the California 8% oil test.

The Court began by putting aside two issues that it considered beside the point. First, "a federal license or certificate of compliance with minimum federal standards [does not] immunize[] the licensed commerce from inconsistent or more demanding state regulations." (To this, the dissent responded that Gibbons v. Ogden is to the contrary.) Second, it is incorrect to claim that "the coexistence of federal and state regulatory legislation should depend upon whether the purposes of the two laws are parallel or divergent." The proper test, the Court said, "is whether both regulations can be enforced without impairing the federal superintendence of the field, not whether they are aimed at similar or different objectives." And preemption should be found only when there are "persuasive reasons—either that the nature of the regulated subject matter permits no other conclusion or that the Congress has unmistakably so ordained."

The Court then outlined the different ways preemption occurs. First, a holding of federal exclusion of state law "is inescapable, and requires no inquiry into congressional design where compliance with both federal and state regulations is a physical impossibility." This would occur, for example, if the federal marketing order forbade the marketing of any avocado testing more than 7% oil, while the California test excluded from the State any avocado measuring less than 8% oil. "As to those Florida avocados of the hybrid and Guatemalan varieties which were actually rejected by the California test, the District Court indicated that the Florida growers might have avoided such rejections by leaving the fruit on the trees beyond the earliest picking date permitted by the federal regulations, and nothing in the record contradicts that suggestion." (The dissent pointed out, however, that doing this would shorten the marketing window for those avocados, contrary to the federal scheme. Therefore, "inevitable collision between the two schemes of regulation" is present.)

Another basis for preemption would be whether "the nature of the subject matter, namely, the maturity of avocados, or any explicit declaration of congressional design to displace state regulation require § 792 to yield to the federal marketing orders." The Court said this is not a subject requiring national uniformity. On the contrary, as a regulation of food, "the maturity of avocados is a subject matter of the kind this Court has traditionally regarded as properly within the scope of state superintendence," because it is regarded as a matter of "peculiarly local concern." The majority distinguished between pre- and post-commerce federal regulation; it said that regulation of standards of the picking, processing, and transportation of agricultural commodities in commerce as properly a field of comprehensive federal regulation, but it should not displace "state control over the distribution and retail sale of those commodities in the interests of the consumers of the commodities within the State." Thus a state such as Florida could not prohibit exportation in commerce of federally certified avocados, but another state such as California may regulate their marketing in that state. At least: "Such a displacement may not be inferred automatically from the fact that Congress has regulated production and packing of commodities for the interstate market." The Court found it immaterial that this was an economic rather than health and safety measure: "neither logic nor precedent invites any distinction between state regulations designed to keep unhealthful or unsafe commodities off the grocer's shelves and those designed to prevent the deception of consumers."

The Court then turned to whether Congress intended that the AAA scheme should displace state law. "The settled mandate governing this inquiry, in deference to the fact that a state regulation of this kind is an exercise of the historic police powers of the States, is not to decree such a federal displacement "unless that was the clear and manifest purpose of Congress." There must be "an unambiguous congressional mandate to that effect," but the Court concluded, "We search in vain for such a mandate." Nothing in the AAA or its legislative history disclosed a "comprehensive congressional design."

Finally the Court expressed skepticism about the truly federal nature of the scheme:

The regulations show that the Florida avocado maturity standards are drafted each year not by impartial experts in Washington or even in Florida, but rather by the South Florida Avocado Administrative Committee, which consists entirely of representatives of the growers and handlers concerned. It appears that the Secretary of Agriculture has invariably adopted the Committee's recommendations for maturity dates, sizes, and weights. Thus, the pattern which emerges is one of maturity regulations drafted and administered locally by the growers' own representatives, and designed to do no more than promote orderly competition among the South Florida growers.

The Court therefore concluded that Congress did not intend "to oust or displace state powers to enact the regulation embodied in § 792." Rather: "The most plausible inference from the legislative scheme is that the Congress contemplated that state power to enact such regulations should remain unimpaired."

==== Equal Protection Clause ====
The Court affirmed the district court's conclusion that the state standard does not work an irrational discrimination as between persons or groups of persons." While "it may well be" that arguably superior tests of maturity could be devised than the 8% oil test, this possibility does not make the state's choice "either arbitrary or devoid of rational relationship to a legitimate regulatory interest." That is not a question for the courts to decide, and "it is sufficient that, on this record, we should conclude, as we do, that oil content appears to be an acceptable criterion of avocado maturity."

==== Undue burden on interstate commerce ====
The Court insisted that "the present record permits no inference that the California statute had a discriminatory objective." Nor has it been shown that "notwithstanding a legitimate state interest in some form of regulation," § 792 "exceeded the limits necessary to vindicate that interest"; or that § 792 was "an illegitimate attempt to control the conduct of producers beyond the borders of California." Nonetheless, the record was inadequate. Much of the proof was directed to other issues than those that would be probative on these points, and the court and parties left it uncertain what evidence entered the record. Therefore, a remand on the Commerce Clause issue was necessary for a new trial on this issue.

==== California's cross-appeal ====
California cross-appealed on the ground that the district court should have dismissed the action for want of equity, rather than for lack of merit. The contention is that there was no justiciable controversy and an insufficient showing of injury (there must be an irreparable injury) to the Florida growers to invoke the district court's equity jurisdiction. The Court rejected both arguments.

First, in the earlier appeal, Florida Lime & Avocado Growers, Inc. v. Jacobsen, the Court had held that, because of the Florida growers' allegations that California officials had consistently condemned Florida avocados as unfit for sale in California, "thus requiring [the Florida growers]—to prevent destruction and complete loss of their shipments—to reship the avocados to and sell them in other States." Thus it was evident that "there is an existing dispute between the parties as to present legal rights amounting to a justiciable controversy which appellants are entitled to have determined on the merits."

Second, even on the present inadequate and ambiguous record, the Florida growers demonstrated sufficient injury to warrant at least a trial of their allegations. It was conceded that the State, in objecting to the growers' proffered evidence, did not dispute the claim that some shipments of Florida avocados had, in fact, been rejected by California for failure to comply with the oil content requirement, to at least the extent of as much as 6.4% of the total shipments of Florida avocados into California. That is enough to warrant a trial on the merits. Furthermore, the case is not moot. It is clear that the California officials will continue to enforce the statute against the Florida-grown avocados, for the State's answer to the complaint declared that these officials "have in the past and now stand ready to perform their duties under their oath of office should they acquire knowledge of violations of the Agricultural Code of the State of California.

=== Dissenting opinion ===
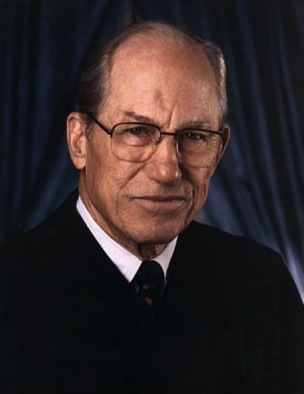
Justice Byron White

Justice Byron White filed a dissenting opinion, joined by Justices Hugo Black, William O. Douglas, and Tom C. Clark.

The four-justice dissent addressed only the preemption issue: "Since we in the minority have concluded that the Agricultural Adjustment Act and regulations promulgated thereunder leave no room for this inconsistent and conflicting state legislation, we reach only the Supremacy Clause issue."

The dissent invoked the same legal standard for preemption as the majority:

The ultimate question for the Court is whether the California law may validly apply to Florida avocados which the Secretary or his inspector says are mature under the federal scheme. We in the minority believe that it cannot, for, in our view, the California law "stands as an obstacle to the accomplishment and execution of the full purposes and objectives of Congress." Hines v. Davidowitz.

But it reached the opposite legal conclusion:

The central and unavoidable fact is that six out of every 100 Florida avocados certified as mature by federal standards are turned away from the California markets as being immature, and are excluded from that State by the application of a maturity test different from the federal measure. Congress empowered the Secretary to provide for the orderly marketing of avocados, and to specify the quality and maturity of avocados to be transported in interstate commerce to any and all markets. Although the Secretary determined that these Florida avocados were mature by federal standards and fit for sale in interstate markets, the State of California determined that they were unfit for sale by applying a test of the type which the Secretary had determined to be unsatisfactory. We think the state law has erected a substantial barrier to the accomplishment of congressional objectives.

The dissent asserted that the Secretary of Agriculture:

has promulgated a comprehensive and pervasive regulatory scheme for determining the quality and maturity of Florida avocados, pursuant to the statutory mandate to "effectuate orderly marketing of such agricultural commodities." He prescribes in minute detail the standards for the size, appearance, shape, and maturity of avocados. Inspection procedures and, for violation of the regulations, criminal and civil sanctions are provided. No gap exists in the regulatory scheme which would warrant state action to prevent the evils of a no-man's land . . . No aspects of avocado maturity are omitted under the federal regulations. Any additional state regulation to "supplement" federal regulation would pro tanto supplant it with another scheme, thereby compromising to some degree the congressional policy expressed in the Act.

Both the California and Secretary's regulatory scheme have the same purpose, a purely economic one—to protect against the marketing of immature avocados, which would antagonize consumers and thus harm the industry. But the California scheme uses one test and the Secretary's scheme uses another. The result is to interfere with national marketing of agricultural products, contrary to the stated purposes of the AAA:

It is declared that the disruption of the orderly exchange of commodities in interstate commerce . . . destroys the value of agricultural assets which support the national credit structure . . . and burden[s] and obstruct[s] . . . commerce.

It is declared to be the policy of Congress . . . to establish and maintain such minimum standards of quality and maturity and such grading and inspection requirements for agricultural commodities . . . as will effectuate . . . orderly marketing. . . .

It may be, as the majority suggests, White went on, that "local conditions of soil, climate, and the like" might call for different rules at the production end of the stream of commerce, but uniformity at the market end of the flow of commerce can be necessary to prevent burdens on commerce in agricultural produce:

It may not obstruct or burden commerce to admit avocados into commerce on diverse bases in different parts of the country; any individual grower in that situation would face but one standard. But it does burden commerce and frustrate the congressional purpose when each grower faces different standards in different markets. To slip from permissible nonuniformity at one end of the stream of commerce to permissible nonuniformity at the other end thus is to read the statute too casually and gloss over the congressional purpose, which expressly was to facilitate marketing in and transportation to "any and all markets in the current of interstate commerce."

The dissent saw a clear case of conflict between the state and federal regulatory schemes:

The conflict between federal and state law is unmistakable here. The Secretary asserts certain Florida avocados are mature. The state law rejects them as immature. And the conflict is over a matter of central importance to the federal scheme. The elaborate regulatory scheme of the marketing order is focused upon the problem of moving mature avocados into interstate commerce.

Because the Secretary of Agriculture adopted one avocado maturity test and California adopted a different one, the state test must give way to the federal one. It is not this Court's duty to decide which test is better. "Neither California nor this Court has any place second-guessing the wisdom of Congress or its delegate," the Secretary of Agriculture. The majority "ignores the plain words of the statute in concluding that the California law does not frustrate the federal scheme."373 U.S. at 175.

The dissent concluded:

The conclusion is inescapable that the California law is an obstacle to the accomplishment and execution of the congressional purposes and objectives, and that the California law and the Agricultural Adjustment Act, as supplemented by the regulations promulgated thereunder, cannot be reconciled, and cannot consistently stand together. The Court should not allow avocados certified as mature under the federal marketing order to be embargoed by any State because it thinks that they are immature.

== Subsequent developments ==
After the remand, and a decade later, a three-judge federal district court decided J.R. Brooks & Son, Inc. v. Reagan. The court found that "the California 8 percent oil content requirement has been maintained and applied against Florida-grown avocados, as the result of pressure from the California avocado industry, for the purpose . . . of excluding competition from Florida avocados in California markets," and the statute has been "maintained and applied to operate, and in fact has operated, as an embargo against Florida-grown avocados" with the effect that it "has caused higher avocado prices to California consumers by preventing the sale of competitive Florida fruit."

The court also found that the U.S. Secretary of Agriculture's regulations governing Florida avocado maturity "effectively keep [...] immature Florida avocados out of the channels of commerce." Moreover, these regulations "provide a better index of maturity than does an 8 percent oil content requirement." "Absent the 8 percent oil content requirement, Florida shippers of avocados would market substantial quantities of West Indian varieties of avocados in California," but even though they are in fact mature they will not pass the California 8 percent test. The effect is that the California statute "as applied to Florida avocados, discriminates in favor of California avocado growers and shippers and against Florida avocado growers and shippers" and "arbitrarily and unreasonably burdens interstate commerce in Florida avocados by imposing a standard which is irrational as applied to Florida avocados."

The court accordingly concluded:

Were it not for the United States Supreme Court decision in Florida Avocado Growers v. Paul, we would conclude that: the application of [the relevant section of the] California Agricultural Code . . . to Florida avocados previously certified as mature under the Federal Marketing Order, violates the Supremacy Clause. The application of the California statute to Florida avocados discriminates against Florida avocados and unreasonably burdens interstate marketing of Florida avocados in violation of the Commerce Clause.

The court therefore held that California could no longer enforce its law requiring 8 percent oil content "with respect to avocados grown in Florida and shipped to California in interstate commerce."

== Commentary ==
=== O'Neil ===
Robert M. O'Neil, who had been Justice Brennan's law clerk at the time of the Avocado decision, analyzed the case in a 1975 article. O'Neil asserted:

Federal regulation of one end of a stream of commerce did not inherently require the states to keep their hands off the other end. The Court did not distinguish between protecting consumers against wasting money on immature produce and protecting health or safety. In fact, the Court seems to have deliberately declined a clear invitation to establish a hierarchy of state regulatory interests. Thus, by implication, preventing deception is as constitutionally valid a purpose as preventing disease in event of a federal-state conflict.

O'Neil compared the Avocado case with the Head case decided during the same term of Court, in which Justice Brennan had concurred separately. In that case, a radio station challenged a New Mexico law forbidding the advertising of eyeglass prices, arguing that the law was in unconstitutional conflict with the regulatory authority of the Federal Communications Commission. The majority held that Congress could not have intended its grant of authority to the FCC to supplant all the detailed state regulation of professional advertising practices. According to O'Neil, "Justice Brennan, who wrote the majority opinion in the Avocado case, offered a . . . different view" in a separate concurring opinion. He disagreed that the FCC regulatory scheme did not address advertising practices. "Thus, preemption could not be avoided because of any lack of federal authority in the field." Rather, it was avoided by the teachings of the Avocado case. These were:

- The field of retail advertising, was not one that required exclusive federal superintendence, because a broadcaster could comply with both federal and state law.
- There was no clear evidence of federal intent to preempt the field; FCC regulation of broadcasting was confined to certain specific facets of licensee conduct, with the implication that other facets should remain open to state regulation.
- Finally, the operation of the state law did not threaten the federal superintendence of the field. It was a general law forbidding certain advertising in all media, not just radio. "Such legislation, whether concerned with the health and safety of consumers, or with their protection against fraud and deception, embodies a traditional state interest of the sort which our decisions have consistently respected."

O'Neil concluded that of the few preemption cases since 1963:

None of these has shed more light on consumer protection issues than the Avocado and Head cases. Meanwhile, lower federal and state courts, faced with regulatory conflicts in the consumer area, have looked to Avocado for guidance.

=== Deutsch ===
Jan Deutsch, who had been the law clerk of Justice Potter Stewart at the time of the Avocado and Head decisions, wrote at length about the Avocado case. Deutsch emphasized the difference between the majority's and dissent's respective views of the contexts of the two regulatory schemes, and in particular the legitimacy of each scheme. The majority opinion insists, "[T]he present record permits no inference that the California statute had a discriminatory objective." At the same time, the majority questioned the legitimacy of the AAA marketing order scheme because:

[T]he Florida avocado maturity standards are drafted each year not by impartial experts in Washington or even in Florida, but rather by the South Florida Avocado Administrative Committee, which consists entirely of representatives of the growers and handlers concerned. It appears that the Secretary of Agriculture has invariably adopted the Committee's recommendations for maturity dates, sizes, and weights. Thus the pattern which emerges is one of maturity regulations drafted and administered locally by the growers' own representatives, and designed to do no more than promote orderly competition among the South Florida growers.

On the other hand, the dissent defends the legitimacy of the AAA scheme:

It is suggested that the regulations involved here are "simply schemes for regulating competition among growers . . . initiated and administered by the growers and shippers themselves." From this proposition, it is in some way reasoned that "the self-help standards of this marketing program" should not be deemed to preclude application of state law which conflicts with and interferes with the operation of the comprehensive federal marketing program. The "simply" part of the proposition overlooks, however, the fact that these are the Secretary's regulations, promulgated under congressional authority. It also overlooks the Secretary's extensive supervisory powers, and his statutory duty under 7 U.S.C. § 602(3) to insure that regulations be carried on "in the public interest." And no case has been cited to us which indicates that the delegation to the regulatees of the power to propose regulations in the first instance violates any provision of general law.

The state legislature rubber-stamping the demands of the California avocado industry and the Secretary of Agriculture rubber-stamping the proposals of the Florida avocado industry thus appear to present a pot and kettle in a relative blackness contest. Deutsch concludes by asking a question that was never answered: given the findings of the 1973 remand decision in Brooks v. Reagan about blatant state protectionism for its domestic avocado industry and that the California 8% oil law "arbitrarily and unreasonably burdens interstate commerce in Florida avocados by imposing a standard which is irrational as applied to Florida avocados," what could the Court say on the appeal of the Brooks case to justify its 1963 decision?

=== WSJ 2016 ===
A June 2016 article in the Wall Street Journal describes the current state of the Avocado War between Florida and California. J.R. Brooks (now Brooks Tropicals LLC), the successful plaintiff in the remand after the Supreme Court opinion, established the trademark "SlimCados" to designate several different Florida avocado varieties that it markets. Brooks promotes the lower fat content of Florida avocados as a desirable diet feature in "trying to compete with California's Hass variety, which accounts for 95% of the American avocado market and 80% of global demand." However, according to the Journal, "the oversize SlimCados look like a guacamole lover's dream," because their weight is up to six times that of a Hass, but "their different taste has left many disappointed, making them the avocado some foodies love to hate." The Journal quotes one detractor of Florida avocados as complaining, "I've never felt so betrayed by a piece of food in my life," because the Florida "avocado's innards were watery, producing a soupy guacamole that lacked the rich, creamy flavor she craved."
