= S. H. Kress & Co. =

Defunct American chain of five and dime stores

- Founded: 1896 (130 years ago); United States
- Defunct: 2001 (25 years ago)
- Fate: Sold to McCrory Stores; defunct in 2001
- Headquarters: United States
- Parent: Genesco (1964–1980); McCrory (1981–2001)

S. H. Kress & Co. was the trading name of a chain of five-and-dime retail department stores in the United States established by Samuel Henry Kress. It operated from 1896 to 2001. In the first half of the 20th century, there were Kress stores with ornamented architecture in hundreds of cities and towns.

== History ==
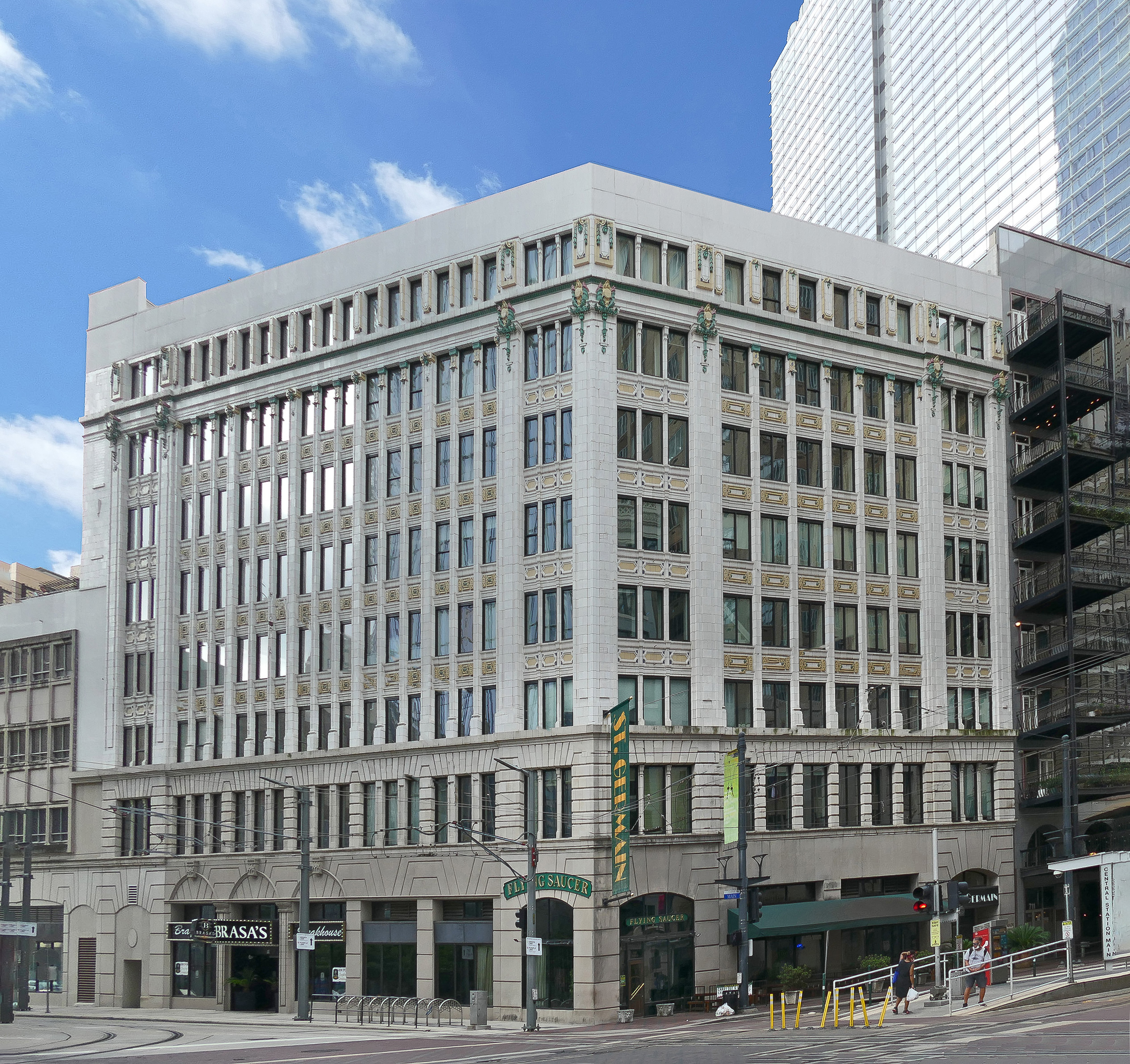
The Kress building in Houston, Texas, 2020

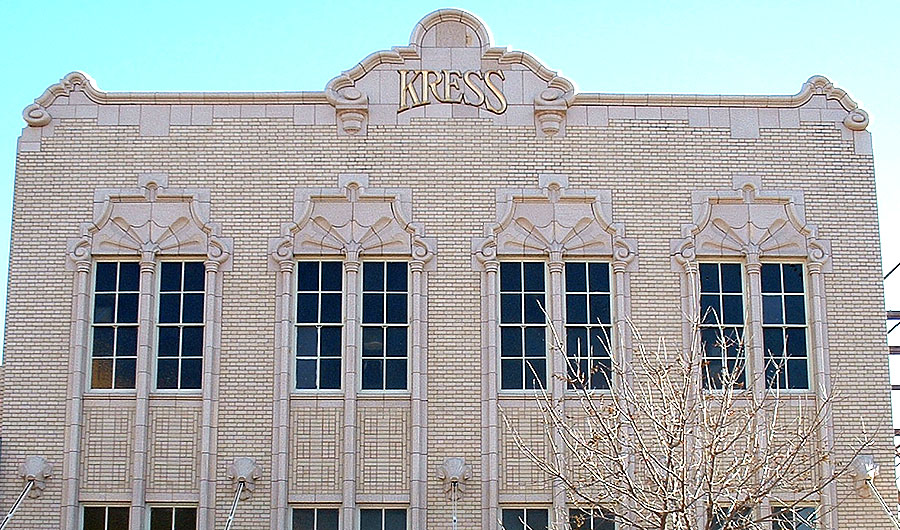
Kress store building in Lubbock, Texas, showing the characteristic design

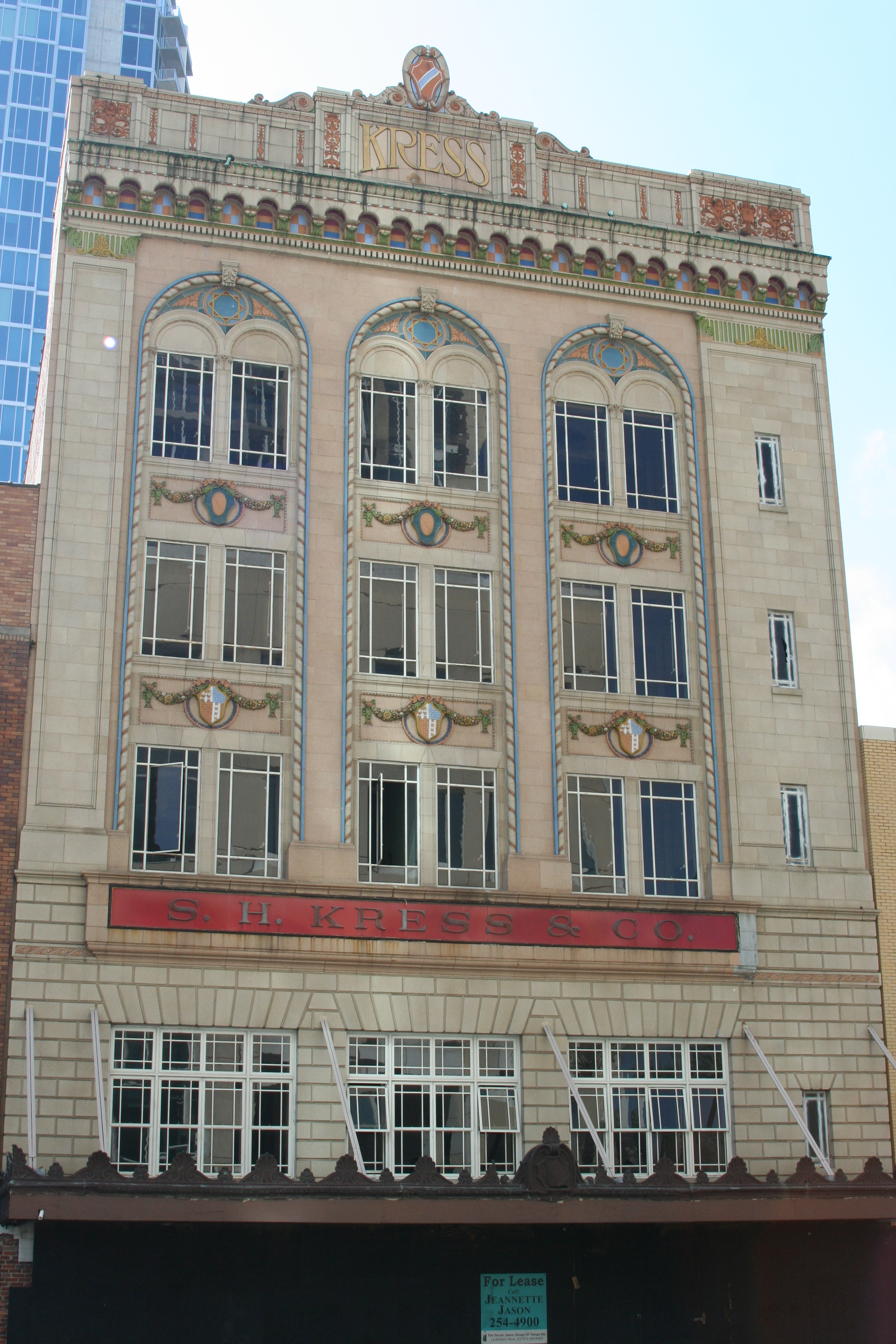
A Kress building in Tampa, Florida

Kress opened his first stationery and notions store in Nanticoke, Pennsylvania, in 1887. The chain of S. H. Kress & Co. 5-10-25 Cent Stores was established in 1896 in Memphis, Tennessee. In the 1920s and 1930s, Kress sold a house label of phonograph records under the Romeo trademark.

Samuel Henry Kress died in 1955.

The events that led to the Harlem riot of 1935 began at the Kress department store at 256 West 125th Street across from the Apollo Theater.

The company's exclusion of African Americans from its lunch counters also made Kress stores a target for civil-rights protests during the 1960 lunch counter sit-ins, along with Woolworth's, Rexall and other national chains. In Nashville, Tennessee, Kress repeatedly refused to serve the protesters but eventually agreed to integrate the downtown store in reaction to a consumer boycott. The Greensboro, North Carolina, Kress store was included in the first civil-rights demonstrations in the South. In Adickes v. S.H. Kress Co., the U.S. Supreme Court threw out convictions for vagrancy resulting from a sit-in at a Kress lunch counter in Mississippi. The Kress store in Baton Rouge, Louisiana, was the site of that city's first civil-rights sit-in, an event that helped save it from demolition forty-five years later.

In 1964, Genesco, Inc., acquired Kress. The company abandoned its center-city stores and moved to shopping malls. Genesco began liquidating Kress and closing down stores in 1980. The remaining Kress stores were sold to McCrory Stores on January 1, 1981. Most stores continued to operate under the Kress name until McCrory Stores went out of business in 2001.

Tiendas Kress, the subsidiary chain in Puerto Rico, survived the parent company until its remaining locations closed in 2022.

The Kress Foundation, a philanthropic organization promoting art, was established by Kress in 1929 and survives the parent company.

== Architecture ==
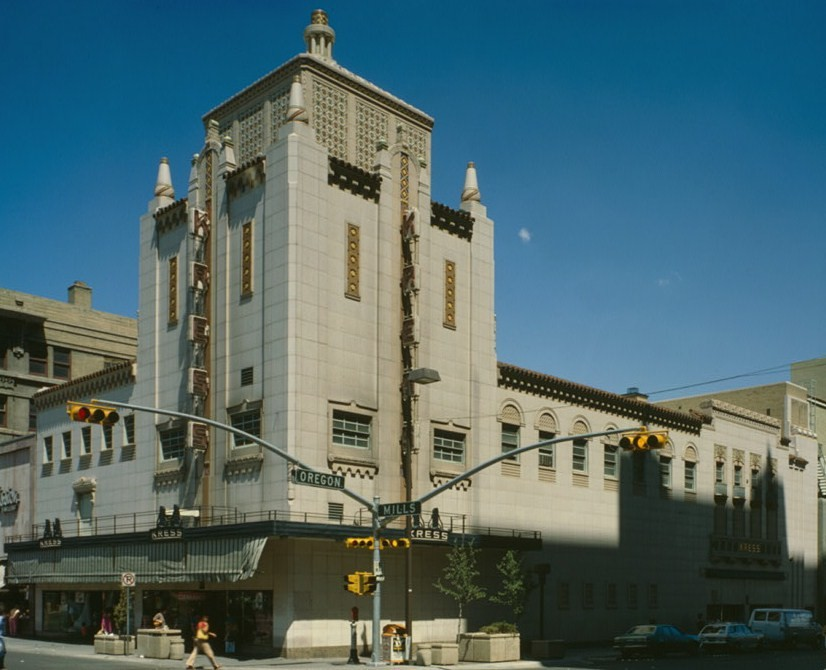
Kress building in El Paso, Texas

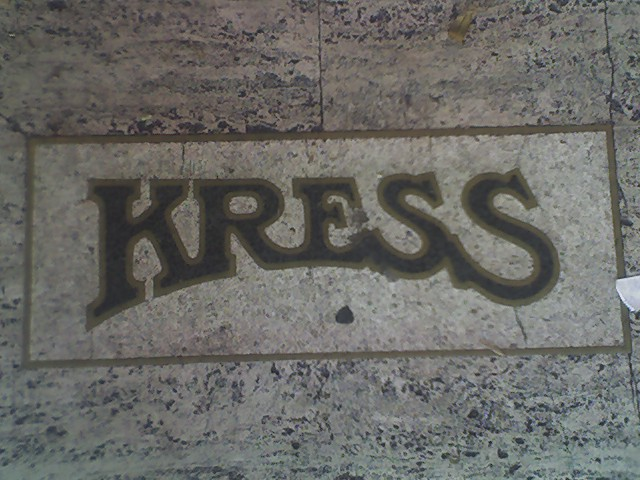
Kress inset on the site of the former Kress store in Berkeley, California

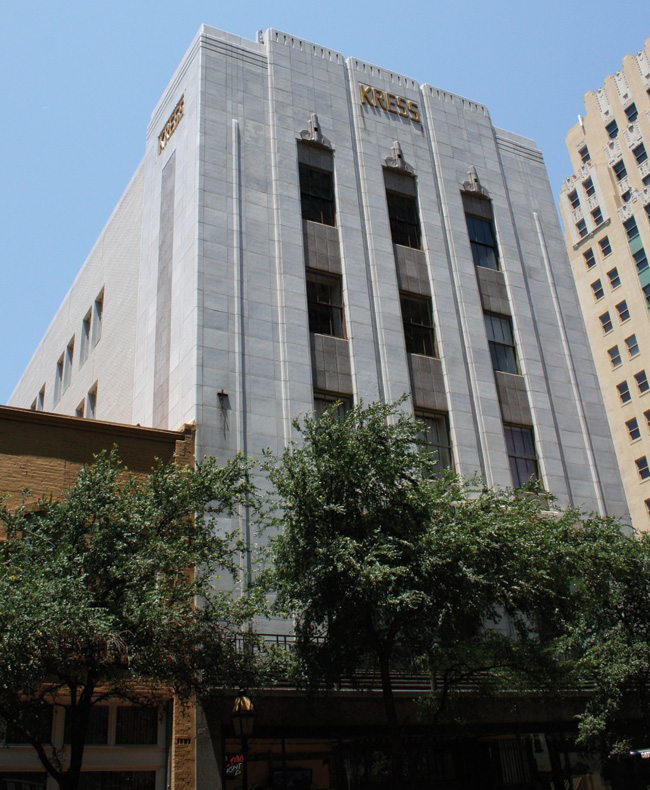
Newly renovated Fort Worth, Texas, Kress building

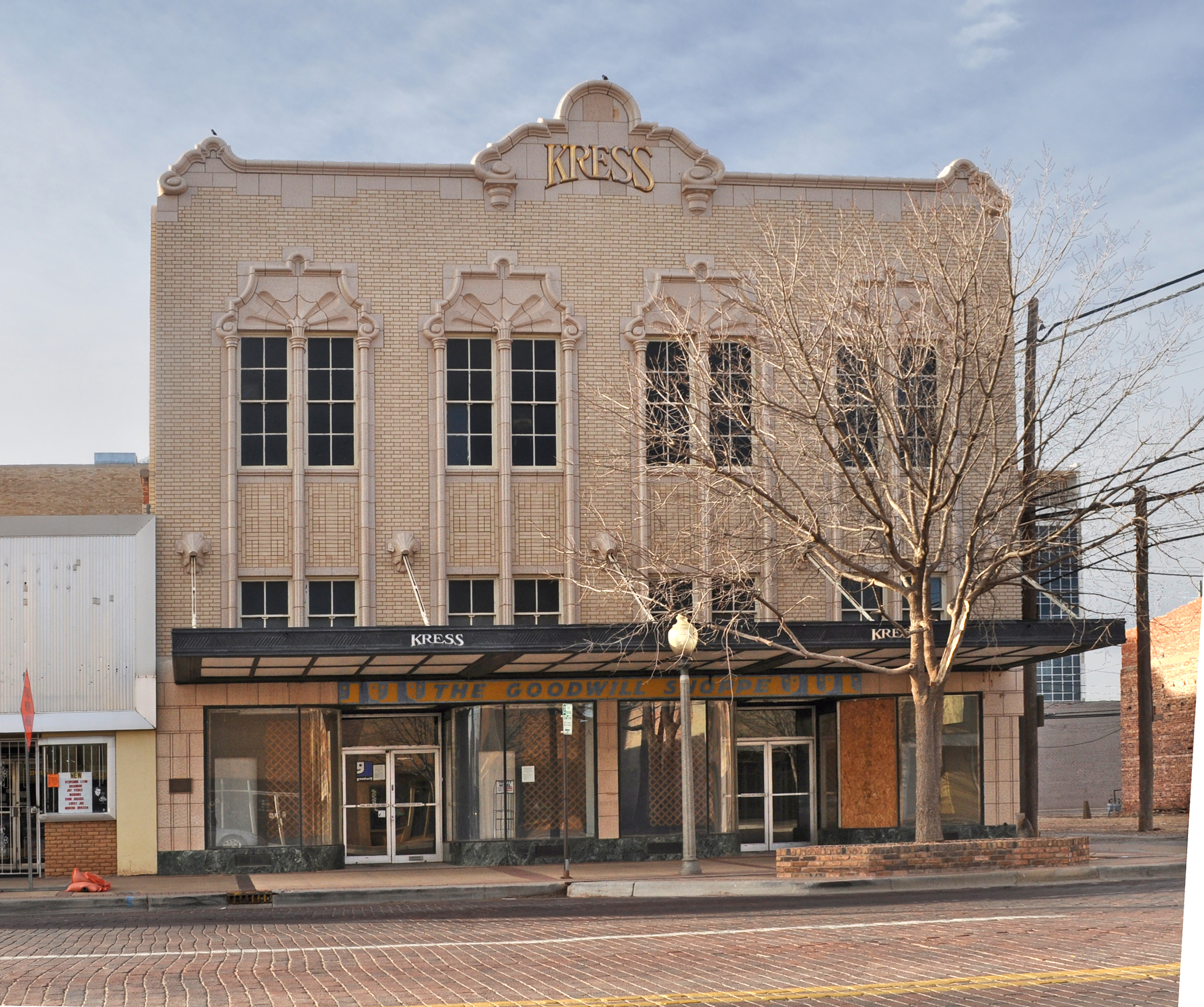
Kress Building in Lubbock, Texas, which is now a Goodwill store

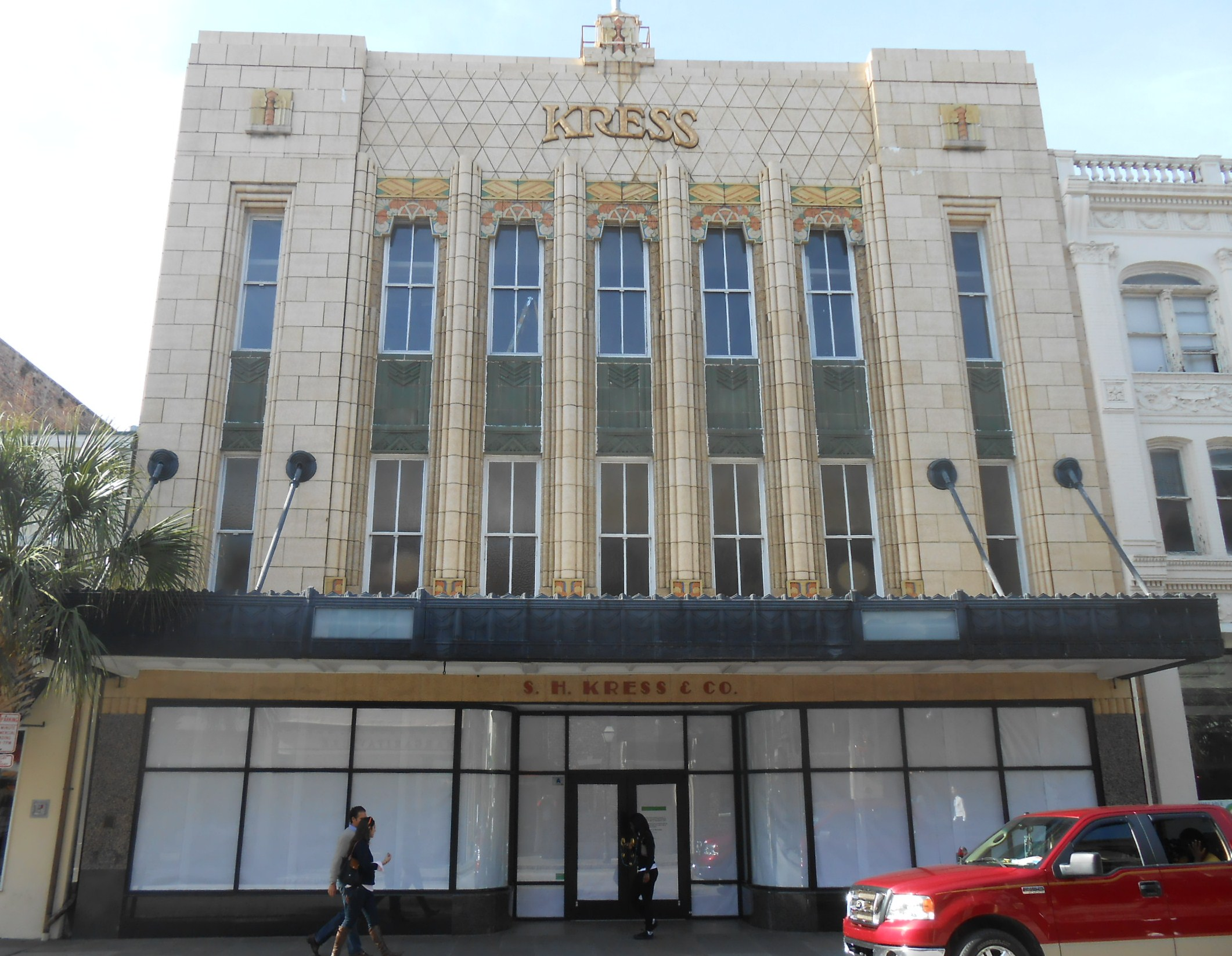
Kress building in Charleston, South Carolina, along the main commercial street

The Kress chain was known for the architecture of its buildings. "Samuel H. Kress... envisioned his stores as works of public art that would contribute to the cityscape." A number of former Kress stores are recognized as architectural landmarks and many are listed on the National Register of Historic Places, including the 1913 building on Canal Street in New Orleans (now the New Orleans Ritz-Carlton) and the 1929 neoclassical store in Asheville, North Carolina.

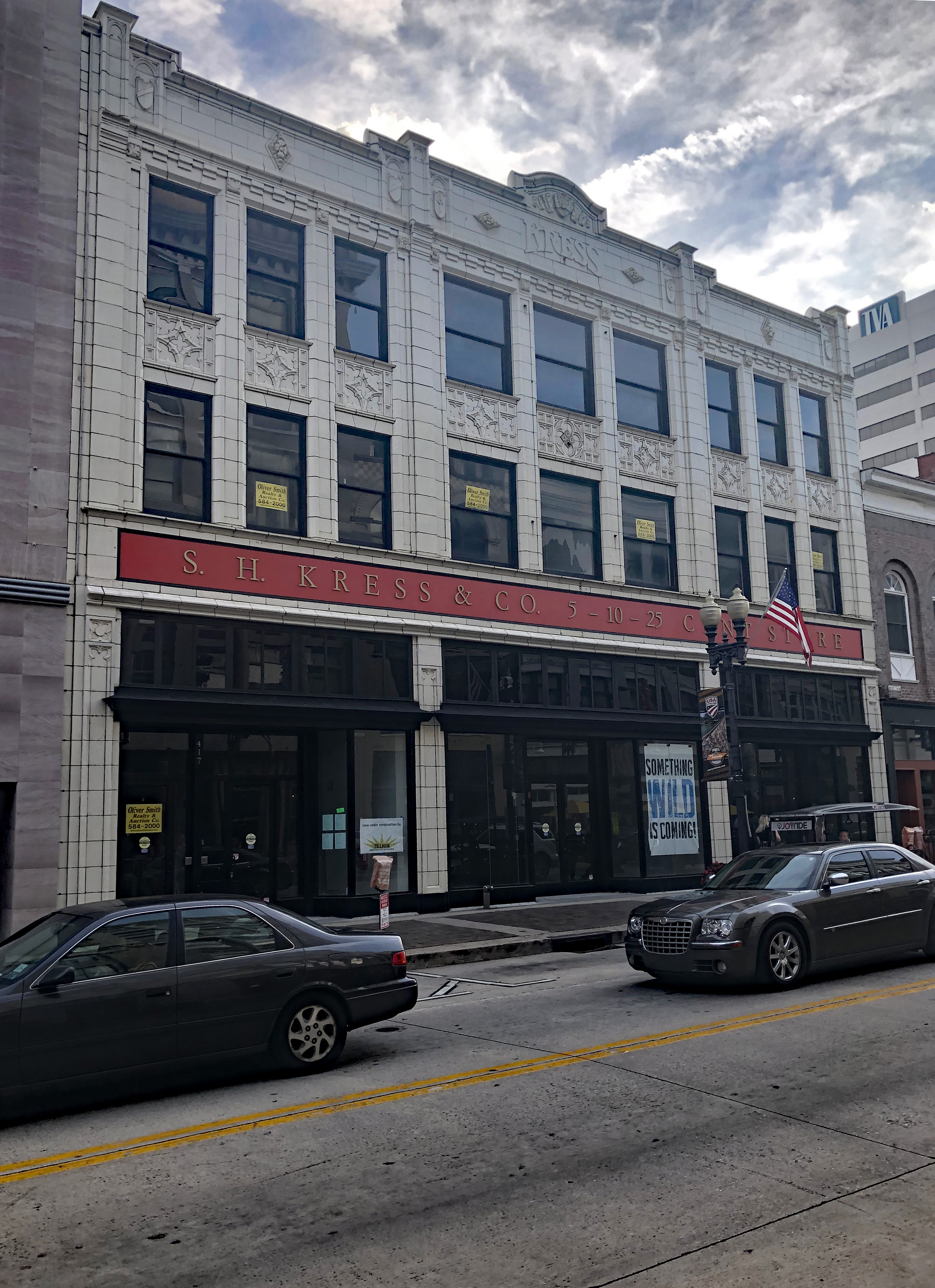
Former S.H. Kress store in downtown Knoxville, Tennessee.

Notable Kress architects include Seymour Burrell, who studied in New York with architect Emmanuel Louis Masqueray, and Edward Sibbert, who designed more than fifty Art Deco S. H. Kress & Co. stores between 1929 and 1944.

Sibbert's buildings streamlined the Kress image with a sleek buff modernity, the lavish use of terracotta ornament, and strong verticals supporting the golden letters "Kress". Curved glass display windows led the shopper through heavy bronze doors into an interior of rich marbles, fine woods, and large customized counters set crosswise down a long sales floor. Well-positioned hanging lamps created a bright atmosphere for an endless array of inexpensive items (there were 4,275 different articles on sale in 1934). Everything – from the constantly restocked merchandise to the gracious retiring rooms and popular soda fountain in the basement – encouraged customers to linger. Like the great movie houses of the day, the dime store – and 'Kress's' in particular – was a popular destination during hard economic times.

Sibbert's Mayan Revival Kress store on Fifth Avenue in New York City was built in 1935 and demolished in 1980.

A seven-story marble structure designed for every shopping comfort, its Art Deco elegance was graced by airborne Mayan gods on the sales floor and Mayan-style hieroglyphs of the gloves and padlocks and yard goods for sale. Awarded a gold medal for architectural quality, the store represented the zenith of the Kress empire in luxury, modernity, and retailing capacity.

The downtown Kress store in Greensboro, North Carolina, is a characteristic example that shows the chain's use of elaborate exterior details including coats-of-arms, metal work, and inlaid artistic flourishes on the keystones and corners.

The National Building Museum in Washington, D.C., holds a permanent collection of Kress building "records, including thousands of drawings and photographs relating to the design, construction, and operation of more than 200 stores stretching from New York to Hawaii."

== Reuse of Kress buildings ==
Various Kress buildings around the country have been adapted for reuse.

- Albuquerque, New Mexico: A new owner has purchased the Kress building, intends to make it a space for all arts Kress building in Albuquerque gets new use.
- Asheville, North Carolina: The Kress building on Patton Avenue in downtown Asheville was restored in the 1990s, and is now The Kress Emporium – a gallery featuring local artists, K2 Studio – a home and furniture store, as well as condominiums in the upper floors.
- Bakersfield, California: The Kress building at 1401 19th Street in downtown Bakersfield has been converted to office space, with the exterior architecture, including Kress signage, still intact.
- Baton Rouge, Louisiana: The Kress building was scheduled to be demolished but was spared in 2005, and has been renovated for residential use.
- Berkeley, California: The Kress building was converted into a discount bookstore, reversion date unknown.
- Biloxi, Mississippi: The downtown Kress store was converted in 2014 into a live music venue, Kress Live.
- Brunswick, Georgia: The Kress building was converted into a boutique hotel in 2023. The hotel also has a climbing gym, piano lounge, and rooftop restaurant.
- Columbia, South Carolina: The Kress building has been renovated into apartments with first floor restaurant and office space.
- Charleston, South Carolina: The Kress store on King Street is now an H&M store.
- Daytona Beach, Florida: The Kress Building located on Beach Street downtown is restored with each floor having a different retro theme and is now home to many small businesses as well as a business center and shared office facility called Work Webb.
- Durham, North Carolina: This 1932 Kress building is located downtown Durham on Main and Mangum streets. The building contains fourteen residential condo units, converted in 2007 and two levels of commercial space. The building retains many Art Deco features such as metal elevators doors, crown moldings, high ceilings, and light fixtures. The exterior architecture, including Kress signage and unique ornamental designs are still intact.
- El Paso, Texas. The building is currently planned for redevelopment into a food hall and entertainment complex, as well as a spa for the adjacent Plaza Hotel Pioneer Park hotel.
- Fort Worth, Texas: The 1936 Kress building in downtown Fort Worth leases residential and office space.
- Florence, South Carolina: The former Kress building is now a part of the Downtown Florence Revitalization Project. This building will house a new restaurant, named Town Hall, a rooftop bar, retail spaces, small condominiums, and office space. Many of the materials used in building these spaces came from the original building. The majority of the wood used in the project was reclaimed from original infrastructure and Kress store shelves – keeping the appearance as historically accurate as possible.
- Greensboro, North Carolina: The former Kress building is currently unoccupied, and waiting for re-development.
- Greenville, Texas: The former Kress building now houses the Landon winery and wine bar
- Gastonia, North Carolina: The former Kress building in downtown Gastonia now houses the second location of Sleepy Poet Antique Mall. Many of the original elements of the building were restored by Sleepy Poet.
- Greeley, Colorado: The Kress store on 8th Avenue and 9th Street is now an independent movie theater (since 2008; kresscinema.com)
- Hilo, Hawaii: The former Kress store has been renovated into Kress Cinema, a downtown movie theater.
- Huntsville, Alabama: The Kress store in downtown Huntsville closed and was boarded up for a while. In 2012, Fubar Nightclub opened on the main floor. A year later, Miller's Tavern, a karaoke bar, was added and then in 2015 the basement was renovated to add Whiskey Bottom Saloon. The exterior of the building remains mostly original.
- Key West, Florida: The Kress Building, located at 500 Duval Street, was home to the eccentric department store Fast Buck Freddie's from 1977 until 2013, and now is a 24-hour CVS drugstore.
- Knoxville, Tennessee: The Kress Building, located at 417 Gay Street, was home to J's Mega Mart until 2019. The street level has been divided into two retail spaces including independently owned and operated all-day cafe and specialty coffee roaster, Frothy Monkey (2022), and Fat Tuesday, a New Orleans daiquiri bar.
- Lakeland, Florida: The Kress Building, located at 109 Kentucky Avenue in downtown Lakeland, is occupied by the Explorations V Children's Museum.
- Los Angeles: In July 2008, The Kress Hollywood nightclub and restaurant opened for a few years in the Los Angeles Kress Building on Hollywood Boulevard. This former Kress store, built in 1935, also served as the flagship Frederick's of Hollywood boutique for 59 years. A second location in south Los Angeles has also been repurposed.
- Memphis, Tennessee: The fourth Kress store built on Main Street is now guest rooms and the conference center for the adjoining SpringHill Suites hotel.
- Meridian, Mississippi: The downtown Kress building is undergoing renovation and was slated to open in early 2016 as the new home of the Mississippi State University Meridian campus kinesiology program.
- Mobile, Alabama: The Kress building on Royal Street houses the offices of The Alabama Media Group (Al.com) on the first two floors. The third floor contains the offices of the building's owner, Hargrove Engineers and Constructors.
- Nashville, Tennessee: The Kress store on 5th Avenue in downtown Nashville is now two loft complexes called Art Avenue Lofts and Kress Lofts.
- Orlando, Florida: The Kres Chophouse restaurant occupies the downtown Orlando building.
- Parsons, Kansas: The Main Street location was turned into an office-supply store.
- Pomona, California: The Kress building on Second Street in downtown Pomona is now an Antique Market as part of Antique Row.
- San Antonio, Texas: The Rococo/NeoClassical 1939 Kress building at 218 S. Presa St. is now a museum and archives for multi cultural, African American art and exhibits.
- Santa Rosa, California: The 1932 Kress building at 615 4th Street houses a Mary's Pizza Shack.
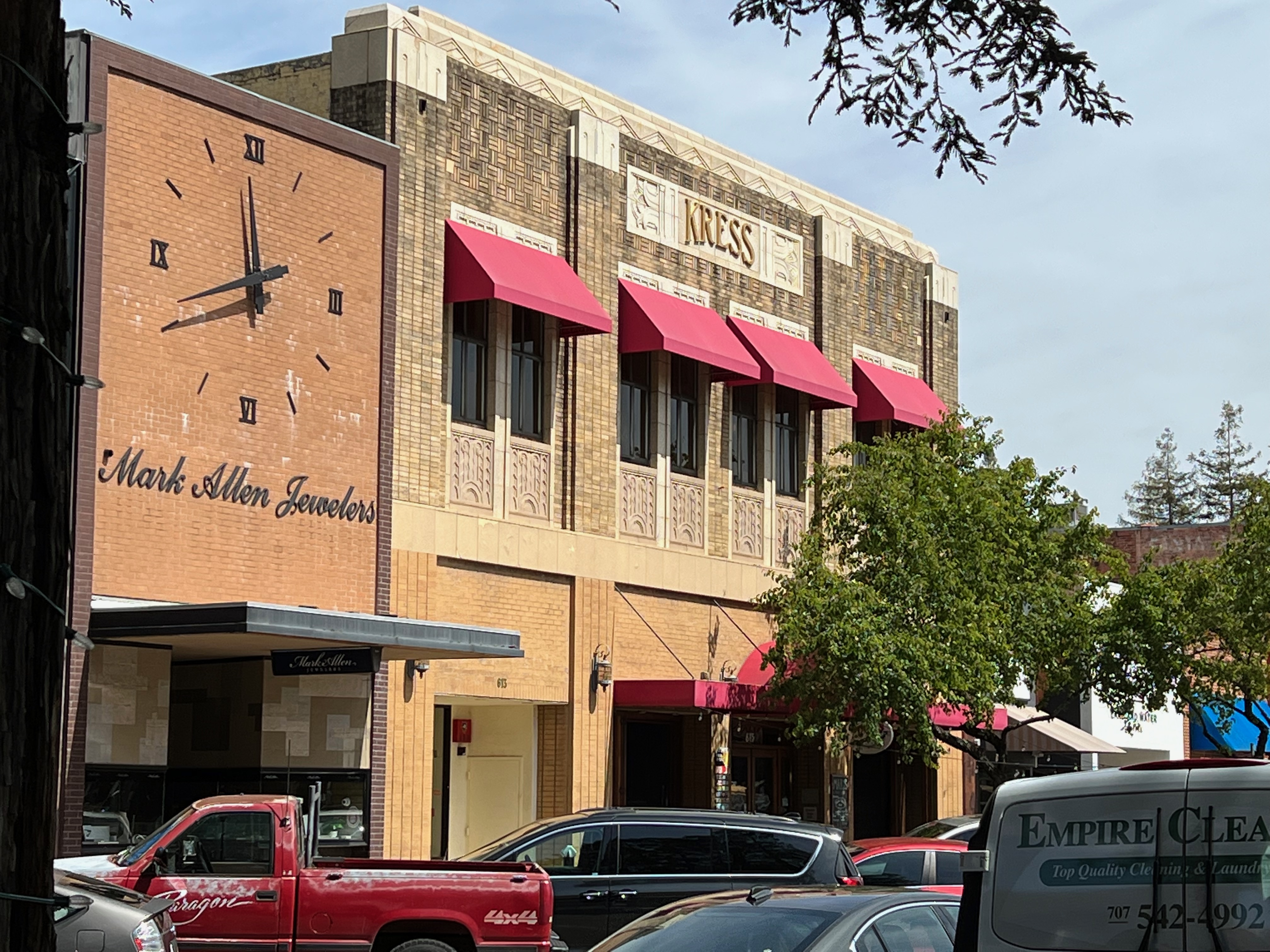
  Kress Building Santa Rosa
- Savannah, Georgia: Was in operation until 1997. In 1998, it remained abandoned until renovated and doubled in size and is now home to a Gap clothing store, as well as a basement restaurant and residential apartments. The building still remains a very well known landmark to the local population.
- Seattle: In June 2008, an IGA supermarket, the Kress IGA, opened on the basement level of the former Kress store in downtown Seattle.
- Selma, Alabama: The Kress building on Broad Street in downtown Selma was later converted in Butler Truax Jewelers.
- Wichita, Kansas: The Kress building is now called the Kress Energy Center. This Kress building is considered the best example of neo-gothic commercial architecture in Wichita. It is listed on city, state, and national registers of historic places.
- Yuma, Arizona: In March 2010, the Kress Ultra Lounge nightclub and Da Boyz Italian Cuisine opened in the Kress building in downtown Yuma on Main Street.

The Kress IGA Supermarket in Seattle, Kress Hollywood, and Kress Cinema in Hilo, Hawaii, differ from many other re-purposed Kress locations due to their prominent use of the Kress name and logo as a component of the branding of the business.

== See also ==
- Kress Building
- Kress Building (Fort Worth, Texas)
- List of S. H. Kress and Co. buildings
- S. H. Kress and Co. Building (Daytona Beach, Florida)
