= Margaree Seawright Crosby =

American civil rights activist

- Born: November 21, 1941
- Died: November 8, 2024 (age 82)
- Occupations: Educator, college professor, advocate for cancer research
- Known for: One of the Greenville Eight

Margaree Seawright Crosby (November 21, 1941 – November 8, 2024) was an American civil rights activist and academic. She was one of the Greenville Eight, Black students arrested for refusing to leave a whites-only public library in 1960. She was a professor of education at Clemson University, and later in life an advocate for breast cancer patients and survivors.

== Early life and education ==
Seawright was from Taylors, South Carolina, the daughter of Mark Seawright and Josie Williams Seawright. Her father served in the United States Navy during World War II, and her mother was a housekeeper. She graduated from Sterling High School, and attended South Carolina State College, where she was active in civil rights protests. Seawright graduated from South Carolina State in 1963, and earned a master's degree in reading education at Clemson University in 1973. She completed doctoral studies in education (Ed.D.) at the University of Massachusetts Amherst in 1976. She was a member of Alpha Kappa Alpha.

== Career ==
Seawright was arrested with Jesse Jackson and other members of the "Greenville Eight" in July 1960, for refusing to leave a whites-only public library. "Our parents were paying taxes on that library, just as well as whites," she explained in 2005. "So we went back; we immediately turned around and went back, and went in and sat down. I remember getting a book off the shelf about wooden false teeth."

Crosby was the first Black woman to become a tenured professor in the College of Education at Clemson University. She was appointed director of early childhood and elementary education at Clemson in 1993. She was the first woman to serve on the board of the Greenville Memorial Hospital System. She gave an oral history interview in 2005, for the "Champions of Civil Rights and Human Rights in South Carolina" digital exhibit at the University of South Carolina.

== Publications ==
- "The College Selection Process: An Empirical Model Proposal" (1989, with Judy D. Holmes and Michael D. Stahl)
- "A Reassessment of Principal Attitudes toward Community Involvement in a Southern Unitary School System" (1990, with Emma M. Owens)
- "An Assessment of Principal Attitudes toward Ability Grouping in the Public Schools of South Carolina" (1991, with Emma M. Owens)
- "The Disadvantages of Tracking and Ability Grouping: A Look at Cooperative Learning as an Alternative" (1993, with Emma M. Owens)

== Personal life ==
Seawright married Willis Herman Crosby Jr. in 1963. They had three children. She had a stroke in 1985; she also survived ovarian and breast cancer diagnoses in the 1980s. Her husband predeceased her in 2022, and she died in 2024, at the age of 82.
