= Greenville Eight =

African american students

- Part of the Civil Rights Movement in South Carolina
- Date: March 1, 1960 - September 19, 1960
- Location: Greenville, South Carolina
- Caused by: Racial segregation; segregation of public libraries
- Result: Integration of city libraries

Parties
National Association for the Advancement of Colored People (NAACP); Greenville Eight	City of Greenville

Lead figures
Greenville NAACP vice president: Reverend James S. Hall Jr.; Greenville Eight: Jesse Jackson; Dorris Wright; Hattie Smith Wright; Elaine Means; Willie Joe Wright; Benjamin Downs; Margaree Seawright Crosby; Joan Mattison Daniel	Mayor J. Kenneth Cass; Greenville City Council

The Greenville Eight was a group of African American students, seven in high school and one in college, that successfully protested the segregated library system in Greenville, South Carolina in 1960. Among the eight was Jesse Jackson, a college freshman. As a result of the staged sit-in, the library system in the city integrated.

== Background ==
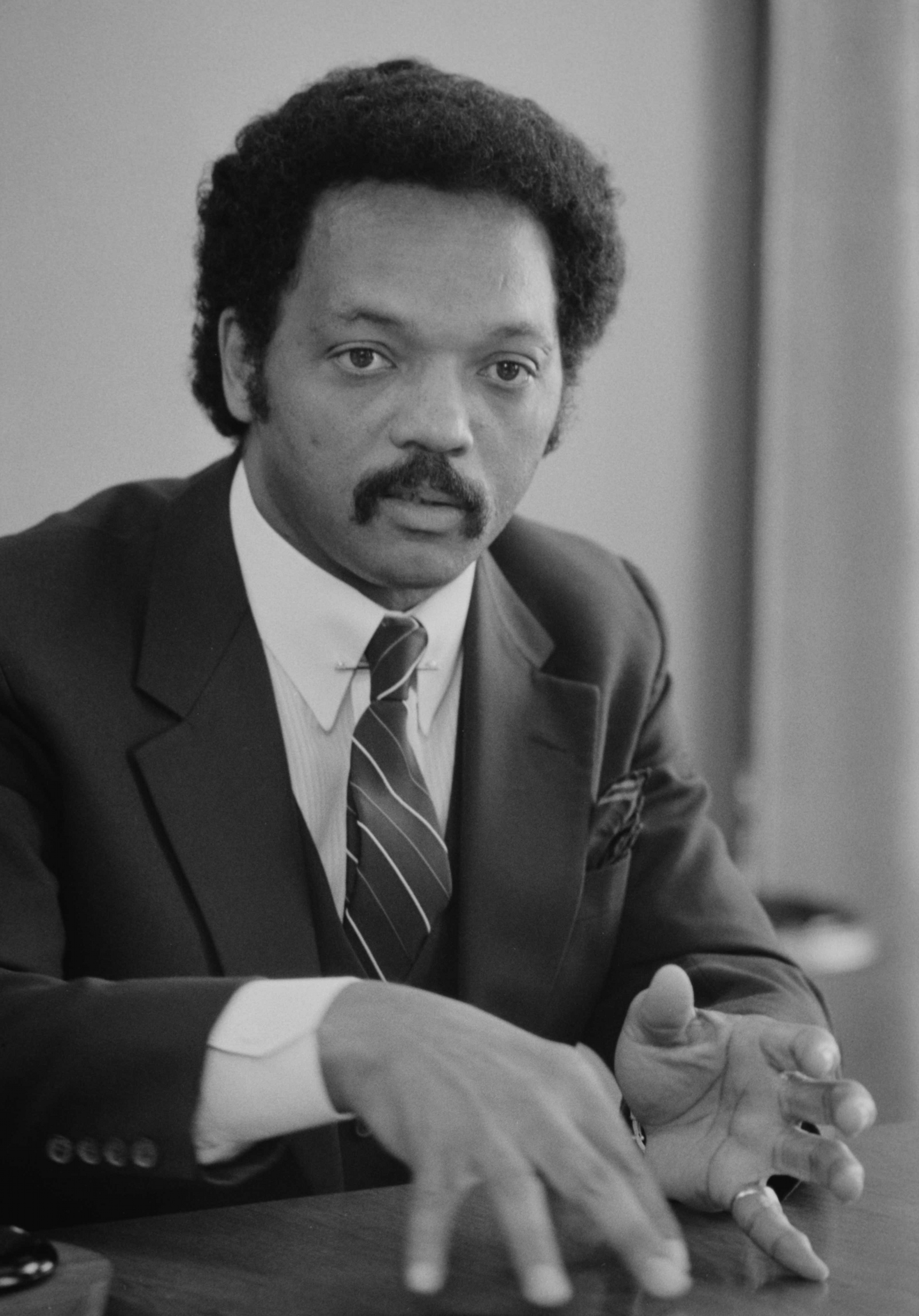
Jesse Jackson, one of the Greenville Eight arrested for staging a sit-in at the public library in Greenville, SC.

By 1960, public libraries in Columbia and Spartanburg integrated without much controversy, but the library system in Greenville remained segregated. Jesse Jackson, a Greenville native, who later became known for his civil rights activism, returned home from college over Christmas break during his freshman year at the University of Illinois. While in Greenville, Jackson required a book to write a research paper. The book Jackson needed was not available at the colored library branch, a one-room, dilapidated house on East McBee Avenue. Many of the books at the colored library were outdated and in poor condition. The librarian at the colored branch wrote Jackson a note and told him to visit the white-only branch as the librarian there was her friend. Upon arriving at the main branch, Jackson went to the rear of the building where the librarian was speaking with a few police officers. Jackson showed the librarian the note; the book Jackson needed was on the shelf inside, but the librarian said he would have to wait six days before he could use it. Jackson attempted to plead with the librarian, but the policeman took her side, adding, "you heard what she said." Angry, Jackson vowed to return in the summer to "take action" and use the library.

On March 1, 1960, twenty black high school students entered the whites-only library branch and attempted to utilize the facility. To counter the protest, officials closed the library for the day. Two weeks later, seven students returned to protest the library's segregation policies, and they were arrested for disorderly conduct, though their actions were never brought to trial. On July 14, Jackson and five other students stood on the steps of the library. After police threatened the protesters with arrest if they entered the building, the protesters left. The News and Courier, a white newspaper in Charleston, South Carolina, wrote in response to the incident, "Third time this year that groups of Negroes have invaded the quiet of the public library." Reverend James S. Hall Jr., the vice president of the Greenville South Carolina NAACP, who had counseled Jackson, noted that the entire point of the protest was to be arrested. He added that they but would likely be released without further incident after arrest. Two days later, Jackson returned to the library with seven other neatly dressed students.

== Protest ==
On July 16, 1960, eight African American students, seven in high school and one in college, entered the whites-only branch of the public library. The students included Jesse Jackson, Dorris Wright, Hattie Smith Wright, Elaine Means, Willie Joe Wright, Benjamin Downs, Margaree Seawright Crosby, and Joan Mattison Daniel. The eight students silently browsed the shelves and sat down to read. Several white patrons in the library left upon seeing the student protesters. A librarian immediately instructed the students to leave, but when they refused, he called the police. The sit-in lasted approximately 40 minutes before the police arrived and arrested all eight protesters. Donald J. Sampson, the first African-American lawyer in Greenville, arrived after the students had been in jail for approximately fifteen minutes, and the court released the students on a $30 bond. They were each charged with "disorderly conduct".

=== Result ===
On July 26, 1960, Sampson filed a federal lawsuit in the United States District Court for the Western District of South Carolina. Sampson claimed that the reason the students were arrested was that "we still have a bunch of illiterate white trash who don't know enough but to have these students arrested." The NAACP condemned Sampson's words. Under the threat of a lawsuit, the Greenville City Council voted to close both the white and colored branches of the library. Greenville Mayor J. Kenneth Cass added,

The efforts made by a few Negroes to use the White library will now deprive White and Negro citizens of the benefit of a library ... This same group, if allowed to continue in their self-centered purpose, may conceivably bring about a closing of all schools, parks, swimming pools and other facilities. It is difficult to see how such results could be of benefit to anyone.

Charles Cecil Wyche of the district court dismissed the case, stating that any ruling was irrelevant since the libraries were closed. But he contended that if the library system reopened in its segregated form, it would be "liable to further discrimination lawsuits". On September 19, the city reopened the libraries quietly after receiving many grievances from citizens throughout the city. The mayor, refusing to publicly admit that the libraries were integrated, added, "The city libraries will be operated for the benefit of any citizen having a legitimate need for the libraries and their facilities. They will not be used for demonstrations, purposeless assembly, or propaganda purposes." Ultimately, the sit-in staged by the Greenville Eight resulted in the library system's integration, and the charges against the students were later dropped. Simultaneous sit-in protests happened throughout the city in the early 1960s, and school desegregation began by the late 1960s.

== The Eight protesters ==
- Jesse Jackson
- Dorris Wright
- Hattie Smith Wright
- Elaine Means
- Willie Joe Wright
- Benjamin Downs
- Margaree Seawright Crosby
- Joan Mattison Daniel

== See also ==
- South Carolina in the civil rights movement
- African Americans in South Carolina
