= Silver v. New York Stock Exchange =

- Supreme Court of the United States

Argued February 25–26, 1963 Decided May 20, 1963
- Full case name: Silver, doing business as Municipal Securities Co., et al. v. New York Stock Exchange
- Citations: 373 U.S. 341 (more) 83 S. Ct. 1246; 10 L. Ed. 2d 389; 1963 U.S. LEXIS 2628

Holding
- The duty of self-regulation imposed upon the Exchange by the Securities Exchange Act of 1934 did not exempt it from the antitrust laws nor justify it in denying petitioners the direct-wire connections without the notice and hearing which they requested. Therefore, the Exchange's action in this case violated 1 of the Sherman Act, and the Exchange is liable to petitioners under 4 and 16 of the Clayton Act.

Court membership
- Chief Justice Earl Warren Associate Justices Hugo Black · William O. Douglas; Tom C. Clark · John M. Harlan II; William J. Brennan Jr. · Potter Stewart; Byron White · Arthur Goldberg

Case opinions
- Majority: Goldberg
- Concurrence: Clark
- Dissent: Stewart, joined by Harlan

Laws applied
- Sherman Antitrust Act of 1890; Clayton Antitrust Act of 1914; Securities Exchange Act of 1934

Silver v. New York Stock Exchange, 373 U.S. 341 (1963), was a case of the United States Supreme Court which was decided May 20, 1963. It held that the duty of self-regulation imposed upon the New York Stock Exchange by the Securities Exchange Act of 1934 did not exempt it from the antitrust laws nor justify its in denying petitioners the direct-wire connections without the notice and hearing which they requested. Therefore, the Exchange's action in this case violated 1 of the Sherman Antitrust Act, and the NYSE is liable to petitioners under 4 and 16 of the Clayton Act.

== Facts ==
Petitioners, two Texas over-the-counter broker-dealers in securities, who were not members of the New York Stock Exchange, arranged with members of the Exchange in New York City for direct-wire telephone connections which were essential to the conduct of their businesses. The members applied to the Exchange, as required by its rules promulgated under the Securities Exchange Act of 1934, for approval of the connections. Temporary approval was granted and the connections were established; but, without prior notice to petitioners, the applications were denied later, and the connections were discontinued, as required by rules of the Exchange. Allegedly as a result, one of the petitioners was forced out of business and the other's business was greatly diminished. Notwithstanding repeated requests, officials of the Exchange refused to grant petitioners a hearing or even to inform them of the reasons for denial of the applications. Petitioners sued the Exchange and its members in a Federal District Court for treble damages and injunctive relief, claiming that their collective refusal to continue the direct-wire connections violated the Sherman Act.

== See also ==
- US antitrust law
