= NLRB v. Erie Resistor Corp. =

United States legal case

NLRB v Erie Resistor Corp
- Court: US Supreme Court
- Citation: 373 US 221 (1963)

Keywords
- Right to organize

NLRB v Erie Resistor Corp 373 US 221 (1963) is a US labor law case concerning the right to organize.

== Background ==
Erie Resistor Corporation and Local 613 of the International Union of Electrical Radio and Machine Workers Employees attempted to negotiate a new collective bargaining agreement in January 1959, which was ultimately unsuccessful. Upon expiration of the previous collective bargaining agreement on March 31st, 1959, the union called a strike which was joined by all 478 employees. Erie Resistor Corporation made use of existing employees to cover operations, but began replacing striking employees. The union was informed by Erie Resistor Corporation that replacement employees and striking employees who crossed the picket line to work would be given 20 years of extra seniority, a benefit in any future layoffs. After the union agreed to lessen its demands in the wake of their dwindling picket line the strike was terminated and a new bargaining agreement approved. Over the following year, the workforce was dramatically downsized, with most layoffs being of strikers who returned to work without the extra seniority that may have insulated them from layoffs. The union filed a charge with the National Labor Relations Board, claiming that the affording of "super seniority" and the subsequent termination of workers without it was illegal. The NLRB found this constituted an unfair labor practice under § 8(a) of the National Labor Relations Act. The corporation appealed.

== Supreme Court Decision ==
Following the NLRB decision, Erie Resistor Corporation appealed the decision to the Third Circuit Court of Appeals, which ruled in favor of the company and held that the policy served a legitimate business purpose. However, the Supreme Court of the United States disagreed and on May 13th, 1963 ruled that Erie Resistor Corporation's policy of super-seniority was indeed an unfair labor practice. The Court's decision was unanimous with Justice Byron White writing the opinion. The Court's opinion stated that the policy had a destructive impact on the strike and union activity, and that the business interest of the corporation did not outweigh the protections afforded to workers by the NLRA. As such, the NLRB' s determination that Erie Resistor had violated Section 8(a)(3) of the NLRA was upheld. The Court did not modify the so-called Mackay Rule which states that companies may permanently replace striking workers, instead ruling more narrowly on the super-seniority benefit. The case was remanded to the Third Circuit Court of Appeals to address additional questions posed by the NLRB decision that were not reviewed in its initial decision.

== See also ==
- US labor law
