= Sandra Adickes =

American activist

Sandra L. Adickes is an American civil rights activist, both during the Vietnam War and with the New York City Teachers Union. She is known for her role in the Mississippi Freedom School of 1964, and as the plaintiff in Adickes v. S. H. Kress & Co. She has also written several books including To be Young was Very Heaven and Legacy of a Freedom School.

== Early life and education ==
Adickes was born on July 14, 1933, and grew up in New York. Adickes has a B.A. from Douglass College (1954), and an M.A. from Hunter College (1964). In 1977 she earned a Ph.D. from New York University. She has taught English at multiple schools, including the College of Staten Island where she and Elizabeth Worthman began a program called Vocational Education for Transitional Adults to women in need of funds to attend college. She also taught at Winona State University.

== Civil rights activism ==
In 1964 Adickes was a teacher at Benjamin Franklin High School in East Harlem, New York, and the disappearance of civil rights workers in Mississippi made her "sick and sore at heart" so she joined a group of six teachers from New York City on a civil rights project to Mississippi. The group in New York relied on fundraising by the United Federation of Teachers, and Adickes co-lead the project with Norma Becker. The program was a part of the movement for Freedom Schools in which temporary and free schools were started in the American south to provide new educational opportunities. In the spring of 1963, Adickes was recruited by Richard Parrish an African American officer of the UFT for a freedom school project in Prince Edward County. Adickes signed up to join members of the civil rights movement for the Freedom Summer of 1964 and she helped recruit forty other teachers for the Freedom Schools.

== Supreme Court case ==
In 1964, was in Hattiesburg, Mississippi and she took her students to the Hattiesburg Public Library to receive a library card. The library was closed by the chief of police in response to a request from the Hattiesburg town mayor, Claude Pittman. After being denied at the library, she and her students went to get lunch together at a Kress store where they were denied service because Adickes, a white woman, was with six of her black students.

In response, Adickes sued and filed a lawsuit, with her lawyer Eleanor Jackson Piel. Adickes sued on two counts— (1) her rights under the Equal Protection Clause of the 14th Amendment were violated as she was being denied service on the basis of race, and (2) she claimed the arrest was the result of Kress and Hattiesburg police collusion. The court decision said that Adickes was refused service under color of any . . . custom, or usage, of the State" in violation of her rights under the Equal Protection Clause of the 14th Amendment. Adickes appealed and the Supreme Court granted certiorari. The case was settled out of court, and Adickes gave her portion of the settlement to the Southern Conference Education Fund to be used for scholarships for the black youth.

== Later years ==
Adickes' activism continued during the Vietnam War when she was again working with Norma Becker in a group called Teachers Committee for Peace in Vietnam who gathered 2700 signatures from people against the war and took out a full-page ad on May 30, 1965, in NY Times. She also crossed picket lines in a 1968 New York City teachers' strike when she left the union because she felt it was no longer relevant.

== Awards and honors ==
Adickes was awarded the "Woman of the Year" by the National Association of Negro Business and Professional Women's Clubs in 1966.

== Select publications ==
Adickes is the author of multiple books. Legends of Good Women is a fiction. To be Young was Very Heaven presents women in New York City in the period prior to World War One, and Legacy of a Freedom School presents Adickes' experiences working with the Student Non-Violent Coordinating Committee.

- Adickes, Sandra (1991). The social quest : the expanded vision of four women travelers in the era of the French Revolution. New York: P. Lang. ISBN 0-8204-0657-0. OCLC 23689599.
- Adickes, Sandra (1992). Legends of good women. Long Lake, Minn.: Castalia Bookmakers. ISBN 978-1-878723-01-7.
- Adickes, Sandra (1998). To be young was very heaven : women in New York before the First World War. Thorndike, Maine: G.K. Hall. ISBN 978-0-7838-0184-1.
- Adickes, Sandra (2005). Legacy of a freedom school (1st ed.). New York: Palgrave Macmillan. ISBN 978-1-4039-7935-3. OCLC 312463972.
