= Adickes v. S. H. Kress & Co. =

- Supreme Court of the United States

Argued November 12, 1969 Decided June 1, 1970
- Full case name: Sandra Adickes, Petitioner v. S. H. Kress & Company
- Citations: 398 U.S. 144 (more) 90 S. Ct. 1598; 26 L. Ed. 2d 142

Case history
- Prior: Cert. to the United States Court of Appeals Second Circuit

Holding
- A party moving for summary judgment carries the burden of proof to establish a lack of factual controversy.

Court membership
- Chief Justice Warren E. Burger Associate Justices Hugo Black · William O. Douglas; John M. Harlan II · William J. Brennan Jr. Potter Stewart · Byron White; Thurgood Marshall

Case opinions
- Majority: Harlan, joined by Burger, Stewart, White
- Concurrence: Black
- Dissent: Douglas
- Dissent: Brennan (in part)
- Marshall took no part in the consideration or decision of the case.

Laws applied
- Rule 56(e) of the Federal Rules of Civil Procedure, 42 U.S.C. §1983

Adickes v. S. H. Kress & Co., 398 U.S. 144 (1970), was a United States Supreme Court case where the majority ruling, written by Justice Harlan, asserted that the burden of showing a lack of factual controversy rests upon the party asserting the summary judgment. It was later challenged by Celotex Corp. v. Catrett (1986), but the case was not officially overruled. While the issue before the Supreme Court was a fairly technical matter, the subject matter regarded the violation of white teacher Sandra Adickes' civil rights in the segregated South, after being refused service at a restaurant because she wished to eat with her black students.

== Background ==
The case centered around a series of incidents on August 14, 1964, in segregated Hattiesburg, Mississippi. The passage of the Civil Rights Act of 1964 on July 2 had on paper outlawed segregation but in practice had yet to catch up, especially in the deeply segregated South.

Plaintiff Sandra Adickes was a white schoolteacher at the Mississippi Freedom School. The Freedom School movement was part of a broad attempt to increase education for black people across the South; at the time the average black Mississippian had only a 6th grade education. The School relied greatly on liberal white teachers from the North, of which Adickes was one. She had spent the first half of 1964 training in New York to become a Freedom School teacher. She arrived in Mississippi on July 4 in the majority black Hattiesburg. Despite its large black population, its white residents had been on a prolonged offensive of harassment and intimidation, especially against supposed Northern agitators. Already that summer, three people had been beaten in Hattiesburg alone by segregationists. Throughout Mississippi, a campaign of church bombings and killings had marked the last few years; just the summer before Medgar Evers had been assassinated.

With the passage of the Civil Rights act and the nominal end of segregation, Adickes's black students were very excited to finally engage in such simple pleasures as being able to see a movie, visit the library, and go to the local Holiday Inn. Adickes determined to take the students on a field trip to show the civic opportunities now afforded to them. She chose the local library, which was funded by black taxpayer money yet had refused to admit blacks, and then to afterwards take the students to lunch. Thus on August 14, Adickes took six students to the Hattiesburg Public Library. Upon entering, they were told that no library cards would be offered to them, and that the library trustees would rather close the library than racially integrate it. Adickes refused to leave, and the library called police, the chief of which arrived and closed the library.

Adickes then took the students to lunch. Lunch counters had proved a previously explosive topic of the Civil Rights movement, such as in the Greensboro sit-ins. They chose to eat at defendant S. H. Kress & Co.'s lunch counter. The party sat down across two booths, and the black students were served. However, the restaurant refused to serve Adickes, saying that they would not be serving whites who came in with blacks, even though they were required to serve blacks. Testimony from the store manager says that the entrance of the Adickes party immediately soured the atmosphere of the lunch counter, and that a group gathered outside, and patrons inside started milling around, clearly agitated by Adickes. The manager believed mob violence was imminent, and claims that was why he refused to serve Adickes. A police officer entered the lunch counter at some point during this, and went into the back of the store. The group left soon after, without eating their food. Upon exiting, Adickes was arrested by that same officer, on the obviously trumped up charge of vagrancy (Adickes was hardly an itinerant, and earned a $2,200 salary as a teacher). She was bailed out of prison a few hours later by a group of lawyers.

Adickes filed a lawsuit in federal court in New York, alleging two counts: (1) Kress had deprived her of the right under the Equal Protection Clause of the Fourteenth Amendment not to be discriminated against on the basis of race, and (2) that both the refusal of service and her subsequent arrest were the product of a conspiracy between Kress and Hattiesburg police. The first count went to trial and was ruled in favor of Kress; the second count was dismissed before trial on a motion for summary judgment. Adickes appealed the case. The United States Supreme Court granted certiorari.

== Issues ==
The Court addressed two issues upon review of this case:

1. Would a conspiracy between Kress and a police officer allow the plaintiff to recover under 42 U.S.C. §1983 (§1983)?
2. Did the District Court err in granting summary judgment on the conspiracy count?

The summary judgement issue was the major issue, and regarded interpretation of rule 56(e) of the Federal Rules of Civil Procedure. The rules have since been amended as a result of Adickes and the later Celotex Corp. v. Catrett (1986).

== Holding ==
1. Yes, a conspiracy between Kress and a police officer would allow the plaintiff to recover under §1983. A §1983 claim requires two elements for recovery: (1) the plaintiff must prove that the defendant has deprived him of a right secured by the "constitution and laws," of the US, and (2) the plaintiff must show that the defendant deprived him of this constitutional right 'under color of any statute, ordinance, regulation, custom, or usage, of any State or Territory' (under color of law). The Court held that the involvement of a state official in such a conspiracy would plainly provide the state action necessary for a §1983 claim.
2. Yes, the District Court erred in granting summary judgment on the conspiracy count. The Court held that the respondent did not carry its burden of showing the lack of any genuine issue of fact. Looking at the evidence provided, the respondent did not, "foreclose the possibility that there was a policeman in the Kress store while petitioner was awaiting service and this policeman reached an understanding with some Kress employee that petitioner not be served." The store manager claimed that he had no communication with the police officer, but no affidavits were submitted by other store personnel. Additionally, the police officers who arrested Adickes did not provide affidavits to foreclose their potential participation in the conspiracy. Kress argued that Adickes did not bring forth evidence asserting the presence of the police officer in the store and that this allows for the summary judgment. The Court holds that because Kress did not meet the initial burden, Adickes had no need to provide this evidence.

Adickes kept summary judgment an "extraordinary remedy", which meant that summary judgement remained a not widely used tool. The drafters of the original Rules of Civil Procedure had not intended summary judgement to be widely used, as summary judgement prevents a jury from ever hearing the case. The finding in Celotex was seen as a partial reversal, and opened up the floodgates of summary judgement. Despite winning at the Supreme Court, Adickes did not take the case to trial again.

== See also ==
- Peterson v. City of Greenville: Another Supreme Court case involving a S. H. Kress lunch counter
