= Edward V. Sparer =

American lawyer

- Born: March 21, 1928; New York City, New York
- Died: June 21, 1983 (aged 55); Woodstock, New York
- Education: Benjamin Franklin High School (New York City); Brooklyn Law School
- Occupation: Attorney
- Known for: Father of Welfare Law

Edward V. Sparer (March 21, 1928 – June 21, 1983) was an attorney known as the "father of welfare law." He was a prominent legal scholar, founded the organizations now known as Mobilization for Justice and the National Center for Law and Economic Justice, and was the strategist behind the landmark U.S. Supreme Court case Goldberg v. Kelly.

== Early life and education ==
Sparer was born in New York City to Marcus Sparer, a retail merchant, and Ada Cohen. He graduated from Benjamin Franklin High School in New York City and enrolled at the City College of New York.

In the summer of 1947, Sparer traveled to the southern United States to organize textile workers on behalf of Henry A. Wallace. During his sophomore year of college he was vice president of the student council and led strikes against the school because of faculty and administrators who were antisemitic and racist. Disillusioned with the school he married his classmate Tanya Schecter and they dropped out and joined the American Communist Party. They moved to Schenectady, New York, and worked to organize a General Electric plant except for a two-year hiatus from 1951-1953 where he served in the U.S. Army as a teacher and later as a lifeguard in Panama.

Sparer resigned from the communist party in 1956 after learning of Joseph Stalin's Great Purge. Sparer then enrolled at Brooklyn Law School as it was the only law school in New York City that would accept him without an undergraduate degree. He graduated at the top of his class and was editor-in-chief of the Brooklyn Law Review.

== Career ==
Despite renouncing the Communist Party he needed a letter of recommendation from anti-communist labor leader David Dubinsky to gain his law license. Upon graduating from law school in 1959, he worked as a lawyer for the International Ladies' Garment Workers' Union. He then briefly transitioned to academia assisting Columbia Law School professor Monrad Paulsen with a study of juvenile courts.

It was through this research that he became familiar with the antipoverty organization Mobilization for Youth (MFY). At that time MFY was expanding into legal services to provide legal information to low-income clients based on a report by the Vera Foundation. Sparer was the first director of the legal services arm of MFY called MFY Legal Services in 1963. Sparer, instead of following the Vera Foundation's recommendation, pushed the organization to focus on impact litigation to change the institutions that created and sustained poverty. MFY Legal Services became the prototype for storefront poverty law offices which opened in virtually every major American city.

In 1965 he left MFY Legal Services and founded the Center on Social Welfare Policy and Law. It served as the center of the welfare rights movement in New York City. Sparer started the Center as the great need of individual clients' demands in neighborhood offices left little time to organize the strategic litigation. His two-tiered model allowed neighborhood lawyers and social workers in community-based offices to handle the day-to-day cases while the Center could partner for the impact litigation.

Sparer brought a series of test cases to create a constitutional "right to live" where the court would recognize the right of individuals to access the essentials of subsistence. Sparer viewed the source of poverty as not from a lack of skills or education but from a lack of power. His test case strategy failed to create a "right to live" but led to several landmark victories at the U.S. Supreme Court. These victories included King v. Smith, Shapiro v. Thompson, and Goldberg v. Kelly.

Sparer transitioned to academia where he taught at Yale Law School from 1967 to 1969 and at the University of Pennsylvania Law School from 1969 until his death. While at the University of Pennsylvania he founded the Health Law Project where he was a pioneer in health law and pushed for greater access to healthcare.

== Death ==
Sparer died on June 21, 1983, in Woodstock, New York. He was survived by his wife Tanya and their three children Ellen, Michael, and Carol.

== Legacy and honors ==
In 1984, University of Pennsylvania Law School renamed the Public Interest Law Conference to the Edward V. Sparer Symposium bringing together legal academics and practitioners to provide insight into the area of poverty law.

In 1985, Brooklyn Law School established the Edward V. Sparer Public Interest Law Fellowship Program for law students to prepare for careers in social justice.
