= Mobilization for Justice =

- Formation: 1963
- Type: Non-profit
- Locations: 100 William Street (6th Floor), New York City, U.S.; 424 East 147 Street (3rd Floor), Bronx, New York, U.S.
- Services: Legal Aid; Impact litigation; Legislative advocacy; Community education
- Key people: Tiffany Austin Liston (Executive Director)
- Staff: 160+
- Website: mobilizationforjustice.org
- Formerly called: MFY Legal Services

Mobilization for Justice (MFJ — formerly MFY Legal Services, Inc.) is a non-profit legal services and advocacy organization serving New York City. MFJ was founded in 1963 and became a model for using a holistic approach to community lawyering.

== History ==
Mobilization for Justice has its roots in Mobilization for Youth (MFY), a community-based social service initiative funded in 1962 by the Kennedy Administration, the National Institute of Mental Health, the Ford Foundation, and the City of New York, with the goal of “enlisting the actionist and researcher in a joint program of social engineering organized to improve opportunities for youth and guide young people into pursuing them.” MFY Legal Services, the legal unit of Mobilization for Youth was launched the following year in 1963 by Edward Sparer who advocated a new approach: “Instead of piecemeal direct legal services in the Legal Aid tradition, most of MFY Legal Unit’s resources should be channeled into targeted study and direct litigation designed to change the institutional structure that created and sustained poverty.” He advocated the use of test cases as an early form of cause lawyering or impact litigation that would “create new legal rights for the poor.” Sparer identified specific issues in the welfare rights arena that were ripe for legal challenges —including residency laws, violations of privacy, inadequate benefits and arbitrary welfare terminations — linking a litigation strategy to a social movement. MFY Legal Services became the prototype for storefront poverty law offices which opened in virtually every major American city. Its work was characterized by "activism and aggressive advocacy." Examples of the work include supporting organizing campaigns that included rent strikes, education boycotts against school segregation and demonstrations at construction sites demanding jobs for people of color.

In 1968, MFY Legal Services challenged the government’s arbitrary cutoff of welfare benefits, which resulted in the U.S. Supreme Court landmark decision Goldberg v. Kelly, affirming the right of public benefits recipients to a fair hearing before benefits are terminated. Writing in The New York Times, Linda Greenhouse noted that “Goldberg v. Kelly . . . proved to be . . . a critical building block in what came to be known as the due process revolution. A series of decisions that followed erected a constitutional shield for the ordinary citizen against the arbitrary or standardless use of governmental power in many contexts.”

In 1996, the Personal Responsibility and Work Opportunity Act imposed restrictions and reduced funding to the Legal Services Corporation that provided MFY Legal Services funding leading to the closing of several neighborhood offices. These federal restrictions such as preventing representation of undocumented New Yorkers or prohibition on class actions lawsuits led to MFY splitting from Legal Services NYC.

In June 2017, MFY Legal Services changed its name to Mobilization for Justice.

== Services ==
Mobilization for Justice provides free services on “pressing civil legal needs including matters regarding housing and foreclosure; consumer, bankruptcy, tax and employment; a variety of legal issues faced by the aged and people with mental illness and physical disabilities; government benefits and immigration; and legal issues that kinship caregivers and parents of children with disabilities struggle with, such as special education needs.” They provide access through legal hotlines and neighborhood clinics.

== Policy advocacy ==
Mobilization for Justice has led numerous campaigns to change and improve public policies and the administration of justice in the court system. Recent campaigns include:

Campaign to Fight “Sewer Service”: MFJ identified the problem that people were being sued for debts without ever getting notices from the debt collectors. MFJ worked with NYC Council Member Daniel Garodnick and the NYC Department Consumer Affairs to pass legislation and enact rules to more strictly regulate process servers.

Campaign to Protect Homeowners in Foreclosure: In 2011, MFJ issued Justice Deceived: How Large Foreclosure Firms Subvert State Regulations Protecting Homeowners, followed in 2012 by Justice Unsettled: How the Foreclosure Shadow Docket & Discontinuances Prevent New Yorkers from Saving their Homes. These reports brought public attention to the “shadow docket” issue, where foreclosure firms failed to move cases to a judge’s docket, allowed them to remain in “limbo,” while the banks rejected mortgage payments and charged homeowners fees and interest. The campaign helped eliminate the “shadow docket.”

Three-Quarter House Reform: In 2010, the organization launched a public campaign to expose abuses in the three-quarter house industry with a rally, a lawsuit, and, with Neighbors Together, a community-based organization, organized the Three-Quarter House Tenant Organizing Project, which produced Three Quarter Houses: The View From the Inside, documenting conditions from the tenants’ viewpoint. MFJ drew attention to widespread Medicaid fraud in which operators received kickbacks for referring tenants to rehab clinics, resulting in charges and convictions against several operators. After years of advocacy, the New York City Council passed five bills to help three-quarter house residents secure stable housing, prohibit landlords from interfering with tenants’ medical treatment, and increase access to relocation services.

== Notable alumni ==
- Nancy Biberman, founder, Women’s Housing and Economic Development Corporation
- Martha Davis, law professor and author, Northeastern University
- Judge Marcie Friedman, New York State Supreme Court
- Judge Lizbeth González, New York State Appellate Division
- Martha S. Jones, American historian and legal scholar, Johns Hopkins University
- Judge Doris Ling-Cohan, New York State Supreme Court
- Judge Margarita Lopez Torres, Kings County Surrogate Court
- Judge Michelle Schreiber, New York City Housing Court
- Judge Marilyn Shafer, New York State Supreme Court
- Hina Shamsi, director, ACLU National Security Project
- Norman Siegel, former director, New York Civil Liberties Union
- Edward V. Sparer, professor and attorney known as the "father of welfare law"
- Stephen Wizner, William O. Douglas Professor of Law, Yale Law School
