= Redistributive change =

Theory of economic justice in US law

Redistributive change is a legal theory of economic justice in the context of U.S. law that promotes the recognition of poverty as a classification, like race, ethnicity, gender, and religion, that should likewise draw extra scrutiny from the courts in matters pertaining to civil rights.

The theory was discussed in academia in the wake of Goldberg v. Kelly, a 1970 U.S. Supreme Court case, which decided that due process, such as a notice and a fair hearing, were required when dealing with the deprivation of a government benefit (such as a medical license) or an entitlement (such as welfare payments). However, attempts to promote redistributive change through the courts gained no traction, and the result of Goldberg v. Kelly was, thus, limited in scope.

One of the goals, in light of Brown v. Board of Education, was to promote equality in school funding, but this was specifically rejected by the Supreme Court in San Antonio Independent School District v. Rodriguez (1973), which ruled that there was no inherent right to education in the United States.

A discussion among two law professors and Illinois State Senator and law lecturer Barack Obama on the topic of civil rights aired on Chicago Public Radio's Odyssey program in 2001. Obama declared in the discussion that redistributive change needs to come through legislation, not the courts, and lamented that the civil rights movement failed to pursue political means to bring such a change about. As a result of Obama's candidacy in the 2008 U.S. Presidential election, the matter became a campaign issue during the final week of the election, fueling a charge made by his opponent, U.S. Senator John McCain, that Obama was a closet socialist.

== See also ==
- General Welfare clause
- Robin Hood plan
- Poverty in the United States
- De-industrialization crisis
