= Equal Protection Clause =

Guarantee of law protecting all persons equally in the US

The Equal Protection Clause is part of the first section of the Fourteenth Amendment to the United States Constitution. The clause, which took effect in 1868, provides "nor shall any State ... deny to any person within its jurisdiction the equal protection of the laws". It mandates that individuals in similar situations be treated equally by the law.

A primary motivation for this clause was to validate the equality provisions contained in the Civil Rights Act of 1866, which guaranteed that all citizens would have the right to equal protection by law. As a whole, the Fourteenth Amendment marked a large shift in American constitutionalism, by applying substantially more constitutional restrictions against the states than had applied before the Civil War.

The meaning of the Equal Protection Clause has been the subject of much debate, and inspired the well-known phrase "Equal Justice Under Law". This clause was the basis for Brown v. Board of Education (1954), the Supreme Court decision that helped to dismantle racial segregation. The clause has also been the basis for Obergefell v. Hodges (2015), which legalized same-sex marriages, along with many other decisions rejecting discrimination against, and bigotry towards, people belonging to various groups.

While the Equal Protection Clause itself applies only to state and local governments, the Supreme Court held in Bolling v. Sharpe (1954) that the Due Process Clause of the Fifth Amendment nonetheless requires equal protection under the laws of the federal government via reverse incorporation.

== Text ==
The Equal Protection Clause is located at the end of Section 1 of the Fourteenth Amendment:

[Nor shall any State] deny to any person within its jurisdiction the equal protection of the laws.

== Background ==
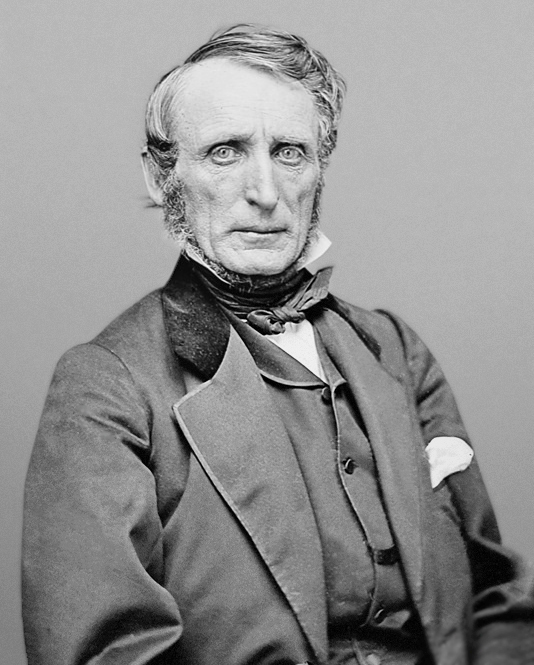
Congressman John Bingham of Ohio was the principal framer of the Equal Protection Clause.

Though equality under the law is an American legal tradition arguably dating to the Declaration of Independence, formal equality for many groups remained elusive. Before passage of the Reconstruction Amendments, which included the Equal Protection Clause, American law did not extend constitutional rights to black Americans. Black people were considered inferior to white Americans, and subject to chattel slavery in the slave states until the Emancipation Proclamation and the ratification of the Thirteenth Amendment.

Even black Americans that were not enslaved lacked many crucial legal protections. In the 1857 Dred Scott v. Sandford decision, the Supreme Court rejected abolitionism and determined black men, whether free or in bondage, had no legal rights under the U.S. Constitution at the time. Currently, a plurality of historians believe that this judicial decision set the United States on the path to the Civil War, which led to the ratifications of the Reconstruction Amendments.

Before and during the Civil War, the Southern states prohibited speech of pro-Union citizens, anti-slavery advocates, and northerners in general, since the Bill of Rights did not apply to the states during such times. During the Civil War, many of the Southern states stripped the state citizenship of many whites and banished them from their state, effectively seizing their property. Shortly after the Union victory in the American Civil War, the Thirteenth Amendment was proposed by Congress and ratified by the states in 1865, abolishing slavery. Subsequently, many ex-Confederate states then adopted Black Codes following the war, with these laws severely restricting the rights of blacks to hold property, including real property (such as real estate), and many forms of personal property, and to form legally enforceable contracts. Such codes also established harsher criminal consequences for blacks than for whites.

Because of the inequality imposed by Black Codes, a Republican-controlled Congress enacted the Civil Rights Act of 1866. The Act provided that all persons born in the United States were citizens (contrary to the Supreme Court's 1857 decision in Dred Scott v. Sandford), and required that "citizens of every race and color ... [have] full and equal benefit of all laws and proceedings for the security of person and property, as is enjoyed by white citizens."

President Andrew Johnson vetoed the Civil Rights Act of 1866 amid concerns (among other things) that Congress did not have the constitutional authority to enact such a bill. Such doubts were one factor that led Congress to begin to draft and debate what would become the Equal Protection Clause of the Fourteenth Amendment. Additionally, Congress wanted to protect white Unionists who were under personal and legal attack in the former Confederacy. The effort was led by the Radical Republicans of both houses of Congress, including John Bingham, Charles Sumner, and Thaddeus Stevens. It was the most influential of these men, John Bingham, who was the principal author and drafter of the Equal Protection Clause.

The Southern states were opposed to the Civil Rights Act, but in 1865 Congress, exercising its power under Article I, Section 5, Clause 1 of the Constitution, to "be the Judge of the ... Qualifications of its own Members", had excluded Southerners from Congress, declaring that their states, having rebelled against the Union, could therefore not elect members to Congress. It was this fact—the fact that the Fourteenth Amendment was enacted by a "rump" Congress—that permitted the passage of the Fourteenth Amendment by Congress and subsequently proposed to the states. The ratification of the amendment by the former Confederate states was imposed as a condition of their acceptance back into the Union.

== Ratification ==
With the return to originalist interpretations of the Constitution, many wonder what was intended by the framers of the reconstruction amendments at the time of their ratification. The Thirteenth Amendment abolished slavery but to what extent it protected other rights was unclear. After the Thirteenth Amendment the South began to institute Black Codes which were restrictive laws seeking to keep black Americans in a position of inferiority. The Fourteenth amendment was ratified by nervous Republicans in response to the rise of Black Codes. This ratification was irregular in many ways. First, there were multiple states that rejected the Fourteenth Amendment, but when their new governments were created due to reconstruction, these new governments accepted the amendment. There were also two states, Ohio and New Jersey, that accepted the amendment and then later passed resolutions rescinding that acceptance. The nullification of the two states' acceptance was considered illegitimate and both Ohio and New Jersey were included in those counted as ratifying the amendment.

Many historians have argued that Fourteenth Amendment was not originally intended to grant sweeping political and social rights to the citizens but instead to solidify the constitutionality of the 1866 Civil rights Act. While it is widely agreed that this was a key reason for the ratification of the Fourteenth Amendment, many historians adopt a much wider view. It is a popular interpretation that the Fourteenth Amendment was always meant to ensure equal rights for all those in the United States. This argument was used by Charles Sumner when he used the Fourteenth Amendment as the basis for his arguments to expand the protections afforded to black Americans.

Although the equal protection clause is one of the most cited ideas in legal theory, it received little attention during the ratification of the Fourteenth Amendment. Instead the key tenet of the Fourteenth Amendment at the time of its ratification was the Privileges or Immunities Clause. This clause sought to protect the privileges and immunities of all citizens which now included black men. The scope of this clause was substantially narrowed following the Slaughterhouse Cases in which it was determined that a citizen's privileges and immunities were only ensured at the Federal level and that it was government overreach to impose this standard on the states. Even in this halting decision the Court still acknowledged the context in which the Amendment was passed, stating that knowing the evils and injustice the Fourteenth Amendment was meant to combat is key in our legal understanding of its implications and purpose. With the abridgment of the Privileges or Immunities clause, legal arguments aimed at protecting black American's rights became more complex and that is when the equal protection clause started to gain attention for the arguments it could enhance.

During the debate in Congress, more than one version of the clause was considered. Here is the first version: "The Congress shall have power to make all laws which shall be necessary and proper to secure ... to all persons in the several states equal protection in the rights of life, liberty, and property." Bingham said about this version: "It confers upon Congress power to see to it that the protection given by the laws of the States shall be equal in respect to life and liberty and property to all persons." The main opponent of the first version was Congressman Robert S. Hale of New York, despite Bingham's public assurances that "under no possible interpretation can it ever be made to operate in the State of New York while she occupies her present proud position."

Hale ended up voting for the final version, however. When Senator Jacob Howard introduced that final version, he said:

It prohibits the hanging of a black man for a crime for which the white man is not to be hanged. It protects the black man in his fundamental rights as a citizen with the same shield which it throws over the white man. Ought not the time to be now passed when one measure of justice is to be meted out to a member of one caste while another and a different measure is meted out to the member of another caste, both castes being alike citizens of the United States, both bound to obey the same laws, to sustain the burdens of the same Government, and both equally responsible to justice and to God for the deeds done in the body?

The 39th United States Congress proposed the Fourteenth Amendment on June 13, 1866. A difference between the initial and final versions of the clause was that the final version spoke not just of "equal protection" but of "the equal protection of the laws". John Bingham said in January 1867: "no State may deny to any person the equal protection of the laws, including all the limitations for personal protection of every article and section of the Constitution ..." By July 9, 1868, three-fourths of the states (28 of 37) ratified the amendment, and that is when the Equal Protection Clause became law.

== Early history following ratification ==
Bingham said in a speech on March 31, 1871 that the clause meant no State could deny anyone "the equal protection of the Constitution of the United States ... [or] any of the rights which it guarantees to all men", nor deny to anyone "any right secured to him either by the laws and treaties of the United States or of such State." At that time, the meaning of equality varied from one state to another.

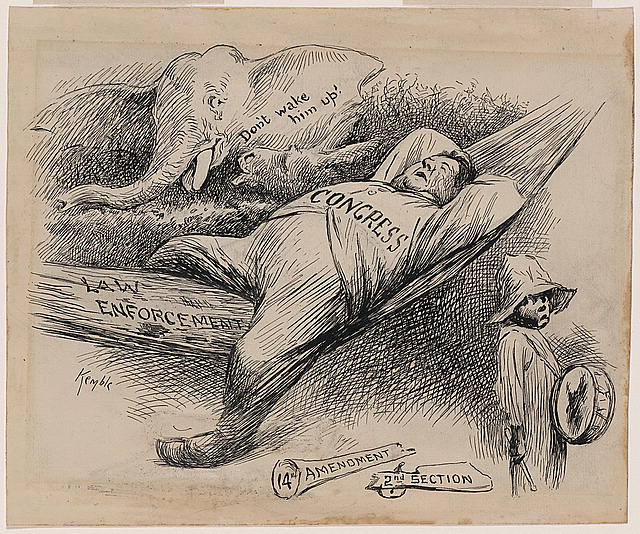
This drawing by E. W. Kemble shows a sleeping Congress with a broken Fourteenth Amendment. It makes the case that Congress ignored its constitutional obligations to Black Americans.

Four of the original thirteen states never passed any laws barring interracial marriage, and the other states were divided on the issue in the Reconstruction era. In 1872, the Alabama Supreme Court ruled that the state's ban on mixed-race marriage violated the "cardinal principle" of the 1866 Civil Rights Act and of the Equal Protection Clause. Almost a hundred years would pass before the U.S. Supreme Court followed that Alabama case (Burns v. State) in the case of Loving v. Virginia. In Burns, the Alabama Supreme Court said:

Marriage is a civil contract, and in that character alone is dealt with by the municipal law. The same right to make a contract as is enjoyed by white citizens, means the right to make any contract which a white citizen may make. The law intended to destroy the distinctions of race and color in respect to the rights secured by it.

As for public schooling, no states during this era of Reconstruction actually required separate schools for blacks. However, some states (e.g. New York) gave local districts discretion to set up schools that were deemed separate but equal. In contrast, Iowa and Massachusetts flatly prohibited segregated schools ever since the 1850s.

Likewise, some states were more favorable to women's legal status than others; New York, for example, had been giving women full property, parental, and widow's rights since 1860, but not the right to vote. No state or territory allowed women's suffrage when the Equal Protection Clause took effect in 1868. In contrast, at that time African American men had full voting rights in five states.

== Gilded Age interpretation and the Plessy decision ==
In the United States, 1877 marked the end of Reconstruction and the start of the Gilded Age. The first truly landmark equal protection decision by the Supreme Court was Strauder v. West Virginia (1880). A black man convicted of murder by an all-white jury challenged a West Virginia statute excluding blacks from serving on juries. Exclusion of blacks from juries, the Court concluded, was a denial of equal protection to black defendants, since the jury had been "drawn from a panel from which the State has expressly excluded every man of [the defendant's] race." At the same time, the Court explicitly allowed sexism and other types of discrimination, saying that states "may confine the selection to males, to freeholders, to citizens, to persons within certain ages, or to persons having educational qualifications. We do not believe the Fourteenth Amendment was ever intended to prohibit this. ... Its aim was against discrimination because of race or color."

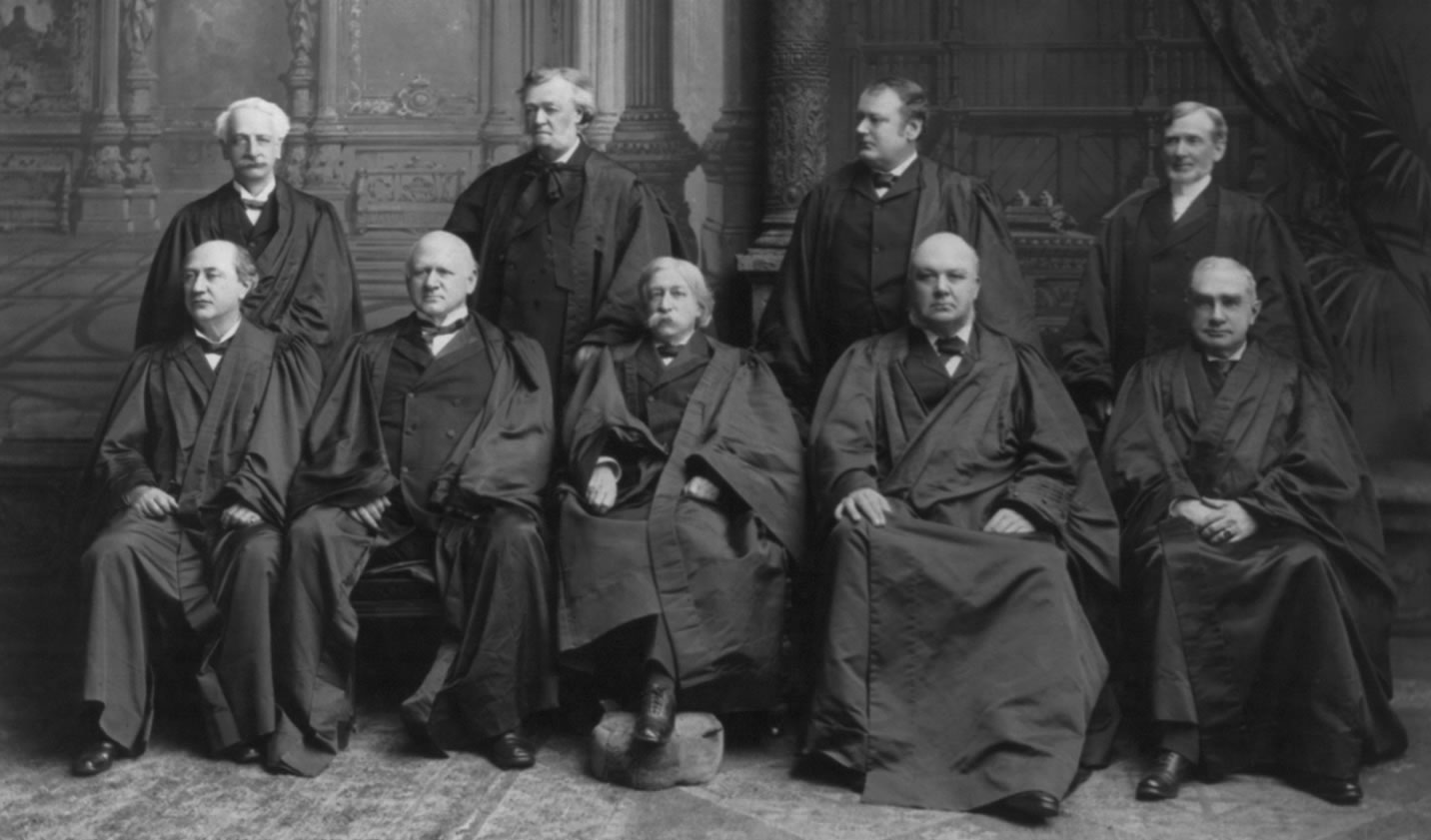
The Court that decided Plessy

The next important postwar case was the Civil Rights Cases (1883), in which the constitutionality of the Civil Rights Act of 1875 was at issue. The Act provided that all persons should have "full and equal enjoyment of ... inns, public conveyances on land or water, theatres, and other places of public amusement." In its opinion, the Court explicated what has since become known as the "state action doctrine", according to which the guarantees of the Equal Protection Clause apply only to acts done or otherwise "sanctioned in some way" by the state. Prohibiting blacks from attending plays or staying in inns was "simply a private wrong." Justice John Marshall Harlan dissented alone, saying, "I cannot resist the conclusion that the substance and spirit of the recent amendments of the Constitution have been sacrificed by a subtle and ingenious verbal criticism." Harlan went on to argue that because (1) "public conveyances on land and water" use the public highways, and (2) innkeepers engage in what is "a quasi-public employment", and (3) "places of public amusement" are licensed under the laws of the states, excluding blacks from using these services was an act sanctioned by the state.

A few years later, Justice Stanley Matthews wrote the Court's opinion in Yick Wo v. Hopkins (1886). In it the word "person" from the Fourteenth Amendment's section has been given the broadest possible meaning by the U.S. Supreme Court:

These provisions are universal in their application to all persons within the territorial jurisdiction, without regard to any differences of race, of color, or of nationality, and the equal protection of the laws is a pledge of the protection of equal laws.

Thus, the clause would not be limited to discrimination against African Americans, but would extend to other races, colors, and nationalities such as (in this case) legal aliens in the United States who are Chinese citizens.

In its most contentious Gilded Age interpretation of the Equal Protection Clause, Plessy v. Ferguson (1896), the Supreme Court upheld a Louisiana Jim Crow law that required the segregation of blacks and whites on railroads and mandated separate railway cars for members of the two races. The Court, speaking through Justice Henry B. Brown, ruled that the Equal Protection Clause had been intended to defend equality in civil rights, not equality in social arrangements. All that was therefore required of the law was reasonableness, and Louisiana's railway law amply met that requirement, being based on "the established usages, customs and traditions of the people." Justice Harlan again dissented. "Every one knows," he wrote,

that the statute in question had its origin in the purpose, not so much to exclude white persons from railroad cars occupied by blacks, as to exclude colored people from coaches occupied by or assigned to white persons ... [I]n view of the Constitution, in the eye of the law, there is in this country no superior, dominant, ruling class of citizens. There is no caste here. Our Constitution is color-blind, and neither knows nor tolerates classes among citizens.

Such "arbitrary separation" by race, Harlan concluded, was "a badge of servitude wholly inconsistent with the civil freedom and the equality before the law established by the Constitution." Harlan's philosophy of constitutional colorblindness would eventually become more widely accepted, especially after World War II.

== Rights of Corporations ==
In the decades after ratification of the Fourteenth Amendment, the vast majority of Supreme Court cases interpreting the Fourteenth Amendment dealt with the rights of corporations, not with the rights of African Americans. In the period 1868–1912 (from ratification of the Fourteenth Amendment to the first known published count by a scholar), the Supreme Court interpreted the Fourteenth Amendment in 312 cases dealing with the rights of corporations but in only 28 cases dealing with the rights of African Americans. Thus, the Fourteenth Amendment was used primarily by corporations to attack laws that regulated corporations, not to protect the formerly enslaved people from racial discrimination. Granting rights under the Equal Protection Clause of the Fourteenth Amendment to business corporations was introduced into Supreme Court jurisprudence through a series of sleights of hands. Roscoe Conkling, a skillful lawyer and former powerful politician who had served as a member of the United States Congressional Joint Committee on Reconstruction, which had drafted the Fourteenth Amendment, was the lawyer who argued an important case known as San Mateo County v. Southern Pacific Railroad before the Supreme Court in 1882. In this case, the issue was whether corporations are "persons" within the meaning of the Equal Protection Clause of the Fourteenth Amendment. Conkling argued that corporations were included in the meaning of the term person and thus entitled to such rights. He told the Court that he, as a member of the Committee that drafted this amendment to the Constitutional, knew that this is what the Committee had intended. Legal historians in the 20th Century examined the history of the drafting of the Fourteenth Amendment and found that Conkling had fabricated the notion that the Committee had intended the term "person" of the Fourteenth Amendment to encompass corporations. This San Mateo case was settled by the parties without the Supreme Court issuing an opinion however the Court's misunderstanding of the intention of the Amendment's drafters that had been created by Conkling's likely deliberate deception was never corrected at the time.

A second fraud occurred a few years later in the case of Santa Clara v. Southern Pacific Railroad, which left a written legacy of corporate rights under the Fourteenth Amendment. J. C. Bancroft Davis, an attorney and the Reporter of Decisions of the Supreme Court of the United States, drafted the "syllabus" (summary) of Supreme Court decisions and the "headnotes" that summarized key points of law held by the Court. These were published before each case as part of the official court publication communicating the law of the land as held by the Supreme Court. A headnote that Davis as court reporter published immediately preceding the court opinion in Santa Clara case stated:

The defendant Corporations are persons within the intent of the clause in section 1 of the Fourteenth Amendment ..., which forbids a state to deny to any person within its jurisdiction the equal protection of the laws.

Davis added before the opinion of the Court:

MR. CHIEF JUSTICE WAITE said: "The Court does not wish to hear argument on the question of whether the provision in the Fourteenth Amendment to the Constitution which forbids a state to deny to any person within its jurisdiction the equal protection of the laws applies to these corporations. We are all of the opinion that it does."

In fact, the Supreme Court decided the case on narrower grounds and had specifically avoided this Constitutional issue.

=== The Supreme Court holding ===
Supreme Court Justice Stephen Field seized on this deceptive and incorrect published summary by the court reporter Davis in Santa Clara v. Southern Pacific Railroad and cited that case as precedent in the 1889 case Minneapolis & St. Louis Railway Company v. Beckwith in support of the proposition that corporations are entitled to equal protection of the law within the meaning of the Equal Protection Clause of the Fourteenth Amendment. Writing the opinion for the Court in Minneapolis & St. Louis Railway Company v. Beckwith, Justice Field reasoned that a corporation is an association of its human shareholders and thus has rights under the Fourteenth Amendment just as the members of the association.

In this Supreme Court case Minneapolis & St. Louis Railway Company v. Beckwith, Justice Field, writing for the Court, thus took this point as established Constitutional law. In the decades that followed, the Supreme Court often continued to cite and to rely on Santa Clara v. Southern Pacific Railroad as established precedent that the Fourteenth Amendment guaranteed equal protection of the law and due process rights for corporations, even though in the Santa Clara case the Supreme Court held or stated no such thing. In the late 19th and early 20th centuries, the clause was used to strike down numerous statutes applying to corporations. Since the New Deal, however, such invalidations have been rare.

== Between Plessy and Brown ==
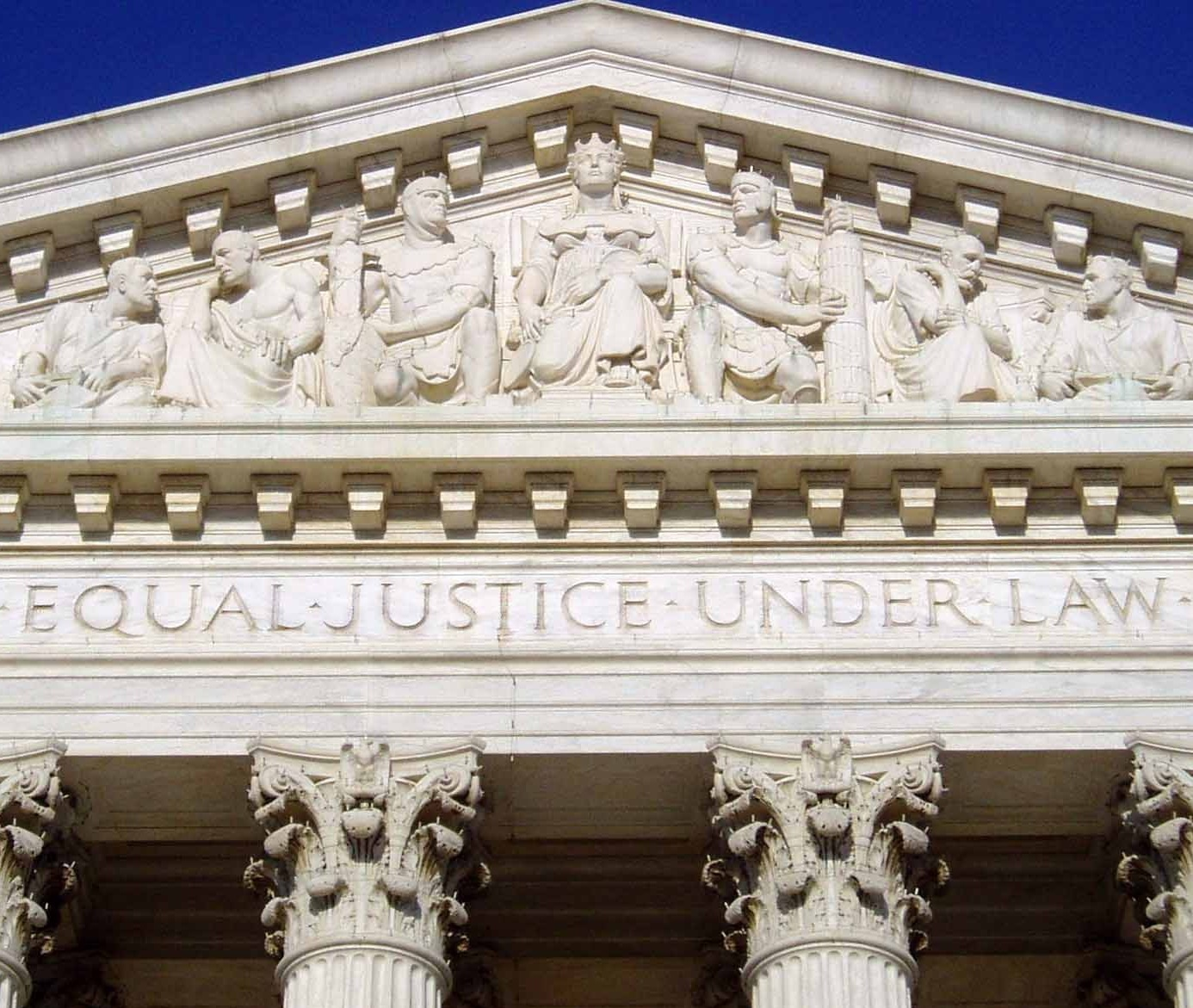
The U.S. Supreme Court Building opened in 1935, inscribed with the words "Equal Justice Under Law" which were inspired by the Equal Protection Clause.

In Missouri ex rel. Gaines v. Canada (1938), Lloyd Gaines was a black student at Lincoln University of Missouri, one of the historically black colleges in Missouri. He applied for admission to the law school at the all-white University of Missouri, since Lincoln did not have a law school, but was denied admission due solely to his race. The Supreme Court, applying the separate-but-equal principle of Plessy, held that a State offering a legal education to whites but not to blacks violated the Equal Protection Clause.

In Shelley v. Kraemer (1948), the Court showed increased willingness to find racial discrimination illegal. The Shelley case concerned a privately made contract that prohibited "people of the Negro or Mongolian race" from living on a particular piece of land. Seeming to go against the spirit, if not the exact letter, of The Civil Rights Cases, the Court found that, although a discriminatory private contract could not violate the Equal Protection Clause, the courts' enforcement of such a contract could; after all, the Supreme Court reasoned, courts were part of the state.

The companion cases Sweatt v. Painter and McLaurin v. Oklahoma State Regents, both decided in 1950, paved the way for a series of school integration cases. In McLaurin, the University of Oklahoma had admitted McLaurin, an African-American, but had restricted his activities there: he had to sit apart from the rest of the students in the classrooms and library, and could eat in the cafeteria only at a designated table. A unanimous Court, through Chief Justice Fred M. Vinson, said that Oklahoma had deprived McLaurin of the equal protection of the laws:

There is a vast difference—a Constitutional difference—between restrictions imposed by the state which prohibit the intellectual commingling of students, and the refusal of individuals to commingle where the state presents no such bar.

The present situation, Vinson said, was the former. In Sweatt, the Court considered the constitutionality of Texas's state system of law schools, which educated blacks and whites at separate institutions. The Court (again through Chief Justice Vinson, and again with no dissenters) invalidated the school system—not because it separated students, but rather because the separate facilities were not equal. They lacked "substantial equality in the educational opportunities" offered to their students.

All of these cases, as well as the upcoming Brown case, were litigated by the National Association for the Advancement of Colored People. It was Charles Hamilton Houston, a Harvard Law School graduate and law professor at Howard University, who in the 1930s first began to challenge racial discrimination in the federal courts. Thurgood Marshall, a former student of Houston's and the future Solicitor General and Associate Justice of the Supreme Court, joined him. Both men were experienced appellate advocates who selected cases they believed provided the strongest legal arguments for their cause.

== Brown and its consequences ==
In 1954, the contextualization of the equal protection clause would change forever. The Supreme Court itself recognized the gravity of the Brown v Board decision acknowledging that a split decision would be a threat to the role of the Supreme Court and even to the country. When Earl Warren became Chief Justice in 1953, Brown had already come before the Court. While Vinson was still Chief Justice, there had been a preliminary vote on the case at a conference of all nine justices. At that time, the Court had split, with a majority of the justices voting that school segregation did not violate the Equal Protection Clause. Warren, however, through persuasion and good-natured cajoling—he had been an extremely successful Republican politician before joining the Court—was able to convince all eight associate justices to join his opinion declaring school segregation unconstitutional. In that opinion, Warren wrote:

To separate [children in grade and high schools] from others of similar age and qualifications solely because of their race generates a feeling of inferiority as to their status in the community that may affect their hearts and minds in a way unlikely ever to be undone ... We conclude that in the field of public education the doctrine of "separate but equal" has no place. Separate educational facilities are inherently unequal.

Warren discouraged other justices, such as Robert H. Jackson, from publishing any concurring opinion; Jackson's draft, which emerged much later (in 1988), included this statement: "Constitutions are easier amended than social customs, and even the North never fully conformed its racial practices to its professions". The Court set the case for re-argument on the question of how to implement the decision. In Brown II, decided in 1954, it was concluded that since the problems identified in the previous opinion were local, the solutions needed to be so as well. Thus the court devolved authority to local school boards and to the trial courts that had originally heard the cases. (Brown was actually a consolidation of four different cases from four different states.) The trial courts and localities were told to desegregate with "all deliberate speed".

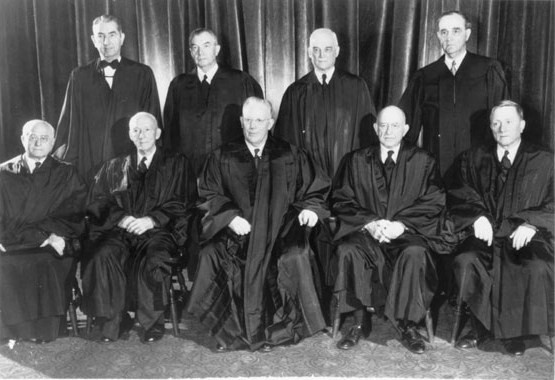
The Court that decided Brown

Partly because of that enigmatic phrase, but mostly because of self-declared "massive resistance" in the South to the desegregation decision, integration did not begin in any significant way until the mid-1960s and then only to a small degree. In fact, much of the integration in the 1960s happened in response not to Brown but to the Civil Rights Act of 1964. The Supreme Court intervened a handful of times in the late 1950s and early 1960s, but its next major desegregation decision was not until Green v. School Board of New Kent County (1968), in which Justice William J. Brennan, writing for a unanimous Court, rejected a "freedom-of-choice" school plan as inadequate. This was a significant decision; freedom-of-choice plans had been very common responses to Brown. Under these plans, parents could choose to send their children to either a formerly white or a formerly black school. Whites almost never opted to attend black-identified schools, however, and blacks rarely attended white-identified schools.

In response to Green, many Southern districts replaced freedom-of-choice with geographically based schooling plans; because residential segregation was widespread, little integration was accomplished. In 1971, the Court in Swann v. Charlotte-Mecklenburg Board of Education approved busing as a remedy to segregation; three years later, though, in the case of Milliken v. Bradley (1974), it set aside a lower court order that had required the busing of students between districts, instead of merely within a district. Milliken basically ended the Supreme Court's major involvement in school desegregation; however, up through the 1990s many federal trial courts remained involved in school desegregation cases, many of which had begun in the 1950s and 1960s.

The curtailment of busing in Milliken v. Bradley is one of several reasons that have been cited to explain why equalized educational opportunity in the United States has fallen short of completion. In the view of various liberal scholars, the election of Richard Nixon in 1968 meant that the executive branch was no longer behind the Court's constitutional commitments. Also, the Court itself decided in San Antonio Independent School District v. Rodriguez (1973) that the Equal Protection Clause allows—but does not require—a state to provide equal educational funding to all students within the state. Moreover, the Court's decision in Pierce v. Society of Sisters (1925) allowed families to opt out of public schools, despite "inequality in economic resources that made the option of private schools available to some and not to others", as Martha Minow has put it.

American public school systems, especially in large metropolitan areas, to a large extent are still de facto segregated. Whether due to Brown, or due to Congressional action, or due to societal change, the percentage of black students attending majority-black school districts decreased somewhat until the early 1980s, at which point that percentage began to increase. By the late 1990s, the percentage of black students in mostly minority school districts had returned to about what it was in the late 1960s. In Parents Involved in Community Schools v. Seattle School District No. 1 (2007), the Court held that, if a school system became racially imbalanced due to social factors other than governmental racism, then the state is not as free to integrate schools as if the state had been at fault for the racial imbalance. This is especially evident in the charter school system where parents of students can pick which schools their children attend based on the amenities provided by that school and the needs of the child. It seems that race is a factor in the choice of charter school.

== Application to federal government ==
By its terms, the clause restrains only state governments. However, the Fifth Amendment's due process guarantee, beginning with Bolling v. Sharpe (1954), has been interpreted as imposing some of the same restrictions on the federal government: "Though the Fifth Amendment does not contain an equal protection clause, as does the Fourteenth Amendment which applies only to the States, the concepts of equal protection and due process are not mutually exclusive." In Lawrence v. Texas (2003) the Supreme Court added: "Equality of treatment and the due process right to demand respect for conduct protected by the substantive guarantee of liberty are linked in important respects, and a decision on the latter point advances both interests" Some scholars have argued that the Court's decision in Bolling should have been reached on other grounds. For example, Michael W. McConnell has written that Congress never "required that the schools of the District of Columbia be segregated." According to that rationale, the segregation of schools in Washington D.C. was unauthorized and therefore illegal.

The federal government has at times shared its power to discriminate against noncitizens with states through cooperative federalism. It has done so in the Welfare Reform Act of 1996 and the Children's Health Insurance Program.

== Tiered scrutiny ==
Despite the undoubted importance of Brown, much of modern equal protection jurisprudence originated in other cases, though not everyone agrees about which other cases. Many scholars assert that the opinion of Justice Harlan Stone in United States v. Carolene Products Co. (1938) contained a footnote that was a critical turning point for equal protection jurisprudence, but that assertion is disputed.

Whatever its precise origins, the basic idea of the modern approach is that more judicial scrutiny is triggered by purported discrimination that involves "fundamental rights" (such as the right to procreation), and similarly more judicial scrutiny is also triggered if the purported victim of discrimination has been targeted because he or she belongs to a "suspect classification" (such as a single racial group). This modern doctrine was pioneered in Skinner v. Oklahoma (1942), which involved depriving certain criminals of the fundamental right to procreate:

When the law lays an unequal hand on those who have committed intrinsically the same quality of offense and sterilizes one and not the other, it has made as invidious a discrimination as if it had selected a particular race or nationality for oppressive treatment.

Until 1976, the Supreme Court usually ended up dealing with discrimination by using one of two possible levels of scrutiny: what has come to be called "strict scrutiny" (when a suspect class or fundamental right is involved), or instead the more lenient "rational basis review". Strict scrutiny means that a challenged statute must be "narrowly tailored" to serve a "compelling" government interest, and must not have a "less restrictive" alternative. In contrast, rational basis scrutiny merely requires that a challenged statute be "reasonably related" to a "legitimate" government interest.

However, in the 1976 case of Craig v. Boren, the Court added another tier of scrutiny, called "intermediate scrutiny", regarding gender discrimination. The Court may have added other tiers too, such as "enhanced rational basis" scrutiny, and "exceedingly persuasive basis" scrutiny.

All of this is known as "tiered" scrutiny, and it has had many critics, including Justice Thurgood Marshall who argued for a "spectrum of standards in reviewing discrimination", instead of discrete tiers. Justice John Paul Stevens argued for only one level of scrutiny, given that "there is only one Equal Protection Clause". The whole tiered strategy developed by the Court is meant to reconcile the principle of equal protection with the reality that most laws necessarily discriminate in some way.

Choosing the standard of scrutiny can determine the outcome of a case, and the strict scrutiny standard is often described as "strict in theory and fatal in fact". In order to select the correct level of scrutiny, Justice Antonin Scalia urged the Court to identify rights as "fundamental" or identify classes as "suspect" by analyzing what was understood when the Equal Protection Clause was adopted, instead of based upon more subjective factors.

== Theories of equal protection ==
The antisubordination principle (antisubjugation principle, equal citizenship principle, or anticaste principle) holds that the Clause's (and sometimes other clauses' and amendments') purpose is to erode legal and institutional roles in social groups' oppression, not to bar protected group classifications often based on race. Legal scholar Owen M. Fiss introduced the idea in a 1976 article proposing a "group-disadvantaging principle" as an alternative to narrower (more individualized, means-oriented) antidiscrimination interpretations. Under the anticlassification principle, such classifications may be suspect on presumption, regardless of purpose or effect. Ruth Colker's 1986 article argued that antisubordination justifies sex-conscious remedies, and it has often been applied to affirmative action.

== Discriminatory intent and disparate impact ==
Because inequalities can be caused either intentionally or unintentionally, the Supreme Court has decided that the Equal Protection Clause itself does not forbid governmental policies that unintentionally lead to racial disparities, though Congress may have some power under other clauses of the Constitution to address unintentional disparate impacts. This subject was addressed in the seminal case of Arlington Heights v. Metropolitan Housing Corp. (1977). In that case, the plaintiff, a housing developer, sued a city in the suburbs of Chicago that had refused to re-zone a plot of land on which the plaintiff intended to build low-income, racially integrated housing. On the face, there was no clear evidence of racially discriminatory intent on the part of Arlington Heights's planning commission. The result was racially disparate, however, since the refusal supposedly prevented mostly African-Americans and Hispanics from moving in. Justice Lewis Powell, writing for the Court, stated, "Proof of racially discriminatory intent or purpose is required to show a violation of the Equal Protection Clause." Disparate impact merely has an evidentiary value; absent a "stark" pattern, "impact is not determinative."

The result in Arlington Heights was similar to that in Washington v. Davis (1976), and has been defended on the basis that the Equal Protection Clause was not designed to guarantee equal outcomes, but rather equal opportunities; if a legislature wants to correct unintentional but racially disparate effects, it may be able to do so through further legislation. It is possible for a discriminating state to hide its true intention, and one possible solution is for disparate impact to be considered as stronger evidence of discriminatory intent. This debate, though, is currently academic, since the Supreme Court has not changed its basic approach as outlined in Arlington Heights.

For an example of how this rule limits the Court's powers under the Equal Protection Clause, see McClesky v. Kemp (1987). In that case a black man was convicted of murdering a white police officer and sentenced to death in the state of Georgia. A study found that killers of whites were more likely to be sentenced to death than were killers of blacks. The Court found that the defense had failed to prove that such data demonstrated the requisite discriminatory intent by the Georgia legislature and executive branch.

The "Stop and Frisk" policy in New York allows officers to stop anyone who they feel looks suspicious. Data from police stops shows that even when controlling for variability, people who are black and those of Hispanic descent were stopped more frequently than white people, with these statistics dating back to the late 1990s. A term that has been created to describe the disproportionate number of police stops of black people is "Driving While Black." This term is used to describe the stopping of innocent black people who are not committing any crime.

In addition to concerns that a discriminating statute can hide its true intention, there have also been concerns that facially neutral evaluative and statistical devices that are permitted by decision-makers can be subject to racial bias and unfair appraisals of ability.' As the equal protection doctrine heavily relies on the ability of neutral evaluative tools to engage in neutral selection procedures, racial biases indirectly permitted under the doctrine can have grave ramifications and result in 'uneven conditions.' ' These issues can be especially prominent in areas of public benefits, employment, and college admissions, etc.'

== Voting rights ==
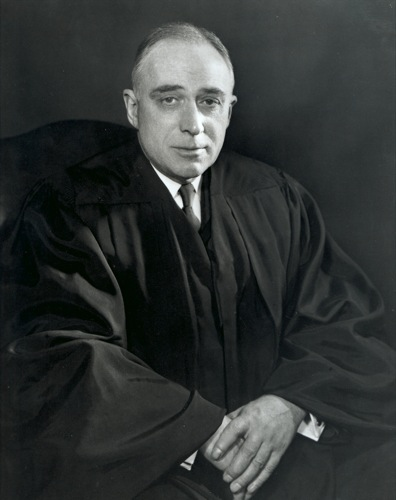
Justice John Marshall Harlan II sought to interpret the Equal Protection Clause in the context of Section 2 of the same amendment

The Supreme Court ruled in Nixon v. Herndon (1927) that the Fourteenth Amendment prohibited denial of the vote based on race. The first modern application of the Equal Protection Clause to voting law came in Baker v. Carr (1962), where the Court ruled that the districts that sent representatives to the Tennessee state legislature were so malapportioned (with some legislators representing ten times the number of residents as others) that they violated the Equal Protection Clause.

It may seem counterintuitive that the Equal Protection Clause should provide for equal voting rights; after all, it would seem to make the Fifteenth Amendment and the Nineteenth Amendment redundant. Indeed, it was on this argument, as well as on the legislative history of the Fourteenth Amendment, that Justice John M. Harlan (the grandson of the earlier Justice Harlan) relied on in his dissent from Reynolds. Harlan quoted the congressional debates of 1866 to show that the framers did not intend for the Equal Protection Clause to extend to voting rights, and in reference to the Fifteenth and Nineteenth Amendments, he said:

If constitutional amendment was the only means by which all men and, later, women, could be guaranteed the right to vote at all, even for federal officers, how can it be that the far less obvious right to a particular kind of apportionment of state legislatures ... can be conferred by judicial construction of the Fourteenth Amendment? [Emphasis in the original.]

Harlan also relied on the fact that Section Two of the Fourteenth Amendment "expressly recognizes the States' power to deny 'or in any way' abridge the right of their inhabitants to vote for 'the members of the [state] Legislature.'" Section Two of the Fourteenth Amendment provides a specific federal response to such actions by a state: reduction of a state's representation in Congress. However, the Supreme Court has instead responded that voting is a "fundamental right" on the same plane as marriage (Loving v. Virginia); for any discrimination in fundamental rights to be constitutional, the Court requires the legislation to pass strict scrutiny. Under this theory, equal protection jurisprudence has been applied to voting rights.

A recent use of equal protection doctrine came in Bush v. Gore (2000). At issue was the controversial recount in Florida in the aftermath of the 2000 presidential election. There, the Supreme Court held that the different standards of counting ballots across Florida violated the equal protection clause. The Supreme Court used four of its rulings from 1960s voting rights cases (one of which was Reynolds v. Sims) to support its ruling in Bush v. Gore. It was not this holding that proved especially controversial among commentators, and indeed, the proposition gained seven out of nine votes; Justices Souter and Breyer joined the majority of five—but only for the finding that there was an Equal Protection violation. Much more controversial was the remedy that the Court chose, namely, the cessation of a statewide recount.

== Sex, disability, and romantic orientation ==
Originally, the Fourteenth Amendment did not forbid sex discrimination to the same extent as other forms of discrimination. On the one hand, Section Two of the amendment specifically discouraged states from interfering with the voting rights of "males", which made the amendment anathema to many women when it was proposed in 1866. On the other hand, as feminists like Victoria Woodhull pointed out, the word "person" in the Equal Protection Clause was apparently chosen deliberately, instead of a masculine term that could have easily been used instead.

In 1971, the U.S. Supreme Court decided Reed v. Reed, extending the Equal Protection Clause of the Fourteenth Amendment to protect women from sex discrimination, in situations where there is no rational basis for the discrimination. That level of scrutiny was boosted to an intermediate level in Craig v. Boren (1976).

The Supreme Court has been disinclined to extend full "suspect classification" status (thus making a law that categorizes on that basis subject to greater judicial scrutiny) for groups other than racial minorities and religious groups. In City of Cleburne v. Cleburne Living Center, Inc. (1985), the Court refused to make the developmentally disabled a suspect class. Many commentators have noted, however—and Justice Thurgood Marshall so notes in his partial concurrence—that the Court did appear to examine the City of Cleburne's denial of a permit to a group home for intellectually disabled people with a significantly higher degree of scrutiny than is typically associated with the rational-basis test.

The Court's decision in Romer v. Evans (1996) struck down a Colorado constitutional amendment aimed at denying homosexuals "minority status, quota preferences, protected status or [a] claim of discrimination." The Court rejected as "implausible" the dissent's argument that the amendment would not deprive homosexuals of general protections provided to everyone else but rather would merely prevent "special treatment of homosexuals." Much as in City of Cleburne, the Romer decision seemed to employ a markedly higher level of scrutiny than the nominally applied rational-basis test.

In Lawrence v. Texas (2003), the Court struck down a Texas statute prohibiting homosexual sodomy on substantive due process grounds. In Justice Sandra Day O'Connor's opinion concurring in the judgment, however, she argued that by prohibiting only homosexual sodomy, and not heterosexual sodomy as well, Texas's statute did not meet rational-basis review under the Equal Protection Clause; her opinion prominently cited City of Cleburne, and also relied in part on Romer. Notably, O'Connor's opinion did not claim to apply a higher level of scrutiny than mere rational basis, and the Court has not extended suspect-class status to sexual orientation.

While the courts have applied rational-basis scrutiny to classifications based on sexual orientation, it has been argued that discrimination based on sex should be interpreted to include discrimination based on sexual orientation, in which case intermediate scrutiny could apply to gay rights cases. Other scholars disagree, arguing that "homophobia" is distinct from sexism, in a sociological sense, and so treating it as such would be an unacceptable judicial shortcut.

In 2013, the Court struck down part of the federal Defense of Marriage Act, in United States v. Windsor. No state statute was in question, and therefore the Equal Protection Clause did not apply. The Court did employ similar principles, however, in combination with federalism principles. The Court did not purport to use any level of scrutiny more demanding than rational basis review, according to law professor Erwin Chemerinsky. The four dissenting justices argued that the authors of the statute were rational.

In 2015, the Supreme Court held in Obergefell v. Hodges that the fundamental right to marry is guaranteed to same-sex couples by both the Due Process Clause and the Equal Protection Clause of the Fourteenth Amendment to the United States Constitution and required all states to issue marriage licenses to same-sex couples and to recognize same-sex marriages validly performed in other jurisdictions.

== Affirmative action ==
Affirmative action is the consideration of race, gender, or other factors, to benefit an underrepresented group or to address past injustices done to that group. Individuals who belong to the group are preferred over those who do not belong to the group, for example in educational admissions, hiring, promotions, awarding of contracts, and the like. Such action may be used as a "tie-breaker" if all other factors are inconclusive, or may be achieved through quotas, which allot a certain number of benefits to each group.

During Reconstruction, Congress enacted programs primarily to assist newly freed slaves who had personally been denied many advantages earlier in their lives, based on their former slave status, not necessarily their race or ethnicity. Such legislation was enacted by many of the same people who framed the Equal Protection Clause, though that clause did not apply to such federal legislation, and instead only applied to state legislation. However, now the Equal Protection Clause does apply to private universities and possibly other private businesses (particularly those who accept federal funds), in accordance with Students for Fair Admissions v. Harvard (2023).

Several important affirmative action cases to reach the Supreme Court have concerned government contractors—for instance, Adarand Constructors v. Peña (1995) and City of Richmond v. J.A. Croson Co. (1989). But the most famous cases have dealt with affirmative action as practiced by public universities: Regents of the University of California v. Bakke (1978), and two companion cases decided by the Supreme Court in 2003, Grutter v. Bollinger and Gratz v. Bollinger.

In Bakke, the Court held that racial quotas are unconstitutional, but that educational institutions could legally use race as one of many factors to consider in their admissions process. In Grutter and Gratz, the Court upheld both Bakke as a precedent and the admissions policy of the University of Michigan Law School. In dicta, however, Justice O'Connor, writing for the Court, said she expected that in 25 years, racial preferences would no longer be necessary. In Gratz, the Court invalidated Michigan's undergraduate admissions policy, on the grounds that unlike the law school's policy, which treated race as one of many factors in an admissions process that looked to the individual applicant, the undergraduate policy used a point system that was excessively mechanistic.

In these affirmative action cases, the Supreme Court has employed, or has said it employed, strict scrutiny, since the affirmative action policies challenged by the plaintiffs categorized by race. The policy in Grutter, and a Harvard College admissions policy praised by Justice Powell's opinion in Bakke, passed muster because the Court deemed that they were narrowly tailored to achieve a compelling interest in diversity. On one side, critics have argued—including Justice Clarence Thomas in his dissent to Grutter—that the scrutiny the Court has applied in some cases is much less searching than true strict scrutiny, and that the Court has acted not as a principled legal institution but as a biased political one. On the other side, it is argued that the purpose of the Equal Protection Clause is to prevent the socio-political subordination of some groups by others, not to prevent classification; since this is so, non-invidious classifications, such as those used by affirmative action programs, should not be subjected to heightened scrutiny.

In Students for Fair Admissions v. Harvard (2023), and its companion case Students for Fair Admissions v. University of North Carolina (2023), the Supreme Court held that race and ethnicity cannot be used in admissions decisions. In other words, preferential treatment based on race or ethnicity violates the Equal Protection Clause. Although "nothing in this opinion should be construed as prohibiting universities from considering an applicant's discussion of how race affected his or her life, be it through discrimination, inspiration, or otherwise," Chief Justice Roberts made it clear that "universities may not simply establish through application essays or other means the regime we hold unlawful today." Moreover, "what cannot be done directly cannot be done indirectly." These opinions effectively ended affirmative action in schools. Although the scope and reach of these opinions are unknown, it is not uncommon for Supreme Court cases' rationale to be applied to similar or analogous facts or circumstances.

== See also ==
- Economic egalitarianism
- Egalitarianism
- Equal consideration of interests
- Equal opportunity
- Equal Rights Amendment
- Equality before the law
- Equality feminism
- Equality of autonomy
- Equality of outcome
- Equality of sacrifice
- Racial equality
- Social equality
- McDonald v. Board of Election Commissioners of Chicago
