= National Center for Law and Economic Justice =

- Company type: Non-profit Organization
- Founded: 1965, New York, New York, U.S.
- Headquarters: New York, New York, U.S.
- Key people: Edward V. Sparer, Founder [Dennis Parker], Executive Director, present = Poverty law
- Revenue: 1,901,109 United States dollar (2017)
- Total assets: 3,644,126 United States dollar (2022)
- Website: www.nclej.org

The National Center for Law and Economic Justice (NCLEJ), formerly known as the Welfare Law Center (WLC) from 1997-2006 and the Center for Social Welfare Policy and Law (CSWPL) from 1965-1997, is a US national non-profit organization dedicated to "advanc[ing] the cause of economic justice for low-income families, individuals, and communities across the country." Specifically, NCLEJ advocates for the following causes: income security, access to employment, fair treatment, public accountability, access to justice, fair and safe workplaces, community action, and civic participation.

NCLEJ was founded in 1965. From the very start, NCLEJ has joined with low-income families, individuals, communities, and a wide range of organizations to advance the cause of economic justice through litigation, policy advocacy, and support of grassroots organizing. NCLEJ’s key issues include child care/work supports, civil rights/racial justice, disability rights, fair administration/modernization, health care/health reform, low-wage workers, meeting basic needs, and SNAP (food stamps).

== Notable cases ==
Since its founding, NCLEJ has won many notable cases. In 1968, NCLEJ won its first Supreme Court welfare case, King v. Smith, which prevented the states from denying public benefits to families determined to be eligible under prior federal law. In 1970, NCLEJ secured a victory in the landmark Supreme Court decision Goldberg v. Kelly, which recognized the right for welfare recipients to receive notice and a fair hearing before being deprived of their benefits. That decision is still a major tool in NCLEJ litigation today. In NCLEJ’s 1970 case Califano v. Westcott, the Supreme Court held sex discrimination in public benefits policies to be unconstitutional.
