= McDonald v. Board of Election Commissioners of Chicago =

- Supreme Court of the United States

Argued November 19, 1968 Decided April 28, 1969
- Full case name: Sam L. McDONALD and Andrew Byrd on behalf of themselves and all other persons similarly situated, v. BOARD OF ELECTION COMMISSIONERS OF CHICAGO, Sidney T. Holzman, Chairman, Marie H. Suthers, Commissioner, and Francis P. Canary, Commissioner
- Docket no.: 68
- Citations: 394 U.S. 802 (more) 89 S.Ct. 1404, 22 L.Ed.2d 739
- Argument: Oral argument

Case history
- Prior: Summary judgment granted for defendants, 277 F.Supp. 14 (1967)

Holding
- An Illinois law that granted absentee ballots to various eligible voters but not to inmates awaiting trial did not violate the Equal Protection Clause of the Fourteenth Amendment.

Court membership
- Chief Justice Earl Warren Associate Justices Hugo Black · William O. Douglas; John M. Harlan II · William J. Brennan Jr. Potter Stewart · Byron White; Abe Fortas · Thurgood Marshall

Case opinions
- Majority: Warren, joined by Black, Douglas, Brennan, White, Fortas, Marshall
- Concurrence: Harlan and Stewart

Laws applied
- U.S Const. amend. XIV

McDonald v. Board of Election Commissioners of Chicago, 394 U.S. 802 (1969), was a unanimous decision by the Supreme Court of the United States that an Illinois law that denied absentee ballots to inmates awaiting trial did not violate their constitutional rights under the Fourteenth Amendment. The Court declined to apply strict scrutiny, and found that the distinctions drawn by the law were rational. The Court particularly noted that the inmates had not shown they could not vote, but rather only that they could not receive absentee ballots.

== Background ==
The plaintiffs in this case, Sam L. McDonald and Andrew Byrd, were inmates awaiting trial in Cook County, Illinois. Illinois law did not allow convicts to vote, but these inmates had not yet been convicted, so in March 1967 they attempted to obtain absentee ballots. Illinois law (specifically Ill.Rev.Stat., c. 46, §§ 19–1 to 19–3) allowed four reasons for people to receive absentee ballots: 1) being absent from one's home county "for any reason whatever", 2) physical incapacity, with a doctor's affidavit, 3) religious observance on election day, or 4) serving as a poll watcher in another county. The inmates argued that "physical incapacity" included their situation, and they even got an affidavit from the warden of the jail to that effect. The Board of Election Commissioners of Chicago denied their applications, saying that the category only included "medical incapacity", not "judicial" incapacity.

== Case before the District Court ==
McDonald and Byrd sued in federal court in Chicago, arguing that their right to vote under the Equal Protection Clause of the Fourteenth Amendment had been violated. They sought an injunction to force the Board to give them absentee ballots, and the Board sought to dismiss the lawsuit, saying that giving them the ballots would be a crime under Illinois law.

According to the plaintiffs' argument, there was no good reason for Illinois to discriminate between those it already gave absentee ballots to - including people who might be in jails in counties other than their home county - while not giving ballots to them. Although a state could choose who it gave absentee ballots to, it could not "unreasonably and arbitrarily discriminate".

On March 30, the District Court granted a temporary order for the inmates to be given ballots, but after a hearing, they granted summary judgment for the Board on December 11. First, it agreed with the Board's interpretation of the statute, restricting "physical incapacity" to mean incapacity for medical reasons. Then, considering the constitutional question, it compared the Illinois law to three other cases where state laws about absentee ballot had been upheld. In the 1916 case Straughan v. Meyers, a Missouri law was upheld that granted absentee ballots to people traveling for work (e.g. railroad employees, traveling salesmen), but not others. In the 1936 case Lemons v. Noller, a Kansas law was upheld that granted absentee ballots to those who would be outside the state, even though physically disabled person inside the state could not get one. And in the 1963 case Hallahan v. Mittlebeeler, a Kentucky law was upheld that granted absentee ballots to those absent from their county who were "in the United States services, or bona fide, full time student[s]," but not others absent from their county. Finding Illinois's rules to be no more unreasonable than these other examples, the Court ruled in favor of the Board. McDonald and Byrd appealed directly to the Supreme Court.

== Decision of the Supreme Court ==
=== Majority opinion ===
A unanimous Supreme Court upheld the decision of the District Court. Writing for the majority, Chief Justice Warren first observed that the plaintiffs had two basic challenges to how Illinois had classified voters: first, that the distinction between medical incapacitated persons and the "judicially" incapacitated "bears no reasonable relationship to any legitimate state objective"; and second, that neither was there any good reason to distinguish between those in pretrial detention in their home county, and those detained elsewhere.

Before dealing with these, the Court addressed the implicit argument that, because the right to vote was involved, some level of strict scrutiny was required:

Such an exacting approach is not necessary here, however, for two readily apparent reasons. First, the distinctions made by Illinois' absentee provisions are not drawn on the basis of wealth or race. Secondly, there is nothing in the record to indicate that the Illinois statutory scheme has an impact on appellants' ability to exercise the fundamental right to vote. It is thus not the right to vote that is at stake here but a claimed right to receive absentee ballots.

— McDonald v. Board of Election Commissioners of Chicago, 394 US 802 (1969), (Warren, writing for the majority)

Instead, the Court applied the general rule for the constitutionality of a statute, that there must be "a rational relationship to a legitimate state end." From that point of view, Illinois absentee ballot laws were unobjectionable. It was rational, after all, to afford some voting conveniences to those with some medical problems, without granting the same to the whole population; and it was also rational to not want inmates voting for local officials from inside prison walls, where the same officials might have undue influence. The majority noted that the plaintiffs had not attempted to vote by any other means than by absentee ballot, saying that Illinois might well permit them to vote in some other manner.

=== Concurrence ===
Justices Harlan and Stewart concurred in the result, but did not join the majority opinion or write their own.
