= Shapiro v. Thompson =

- Supreme Court of the United States

Argued May 1, 1968 Reargued October 23–24, 1968 Decided April 21, 1969
- Full case name: Shapiro v. Thompson
- Citations: 394 U.S. 618 (more) 89 S. Ct. 1322; 22 L. Ed. 2d 600; 1969 U.S. LEXIS 3190
- Argument: Oral argument

Case history
- Prior: Thompson v. Shapiro, 270 F. Supp. 331 (D. Conn. 1967); Harrell v. Tobriner, 279 F. Supp. 22 (D.D.C. 1967); Smith v. Reynolds, 277 F. Supp. 65 (E.D. Pa. 1967)

Holding
- The fundamental right to travel and the Equal Protection Clause forbid a state from reserving welfare benefits only for persons that have resided in the state for at least a year.

Court membership
- Chief Justice Earl Warren Associate Justices Hugo Black · William O. Douglas; John M. Harlan II · William J. Brennan Jr. Potter Stewart · Byron White; Abe Fortas · Thurgood Marshall

Case opinions
- Majority: Brennan, joined by Douglas, Stewart, White, Fortas, Marshall
- Concurrence: Stewart
- Dissent: Warren, joined by Black
- Dissent: Harlan

Laws applied
- U.S. Const. amends. I, XIV

Shapiro v. Thompson, 394 U.S. 618 (1969), is a landmark decision of the Supreme Court of the United States that invalidated state durational residency requirements for public assistance and helped establish a fundamental "right to travel" in U.S. law. Shapiro was a part of a set of three welfare cases all heard during the 1968–69 term by the Supreme Court, alongside Harrell v. Tobriner and Smith v. Reynolds. Additionally, Shapiro, King v. Smith (1968), and Goldberg v. Kelly (1970) comprise the "Welfare Cases", a set of successful Supreme Court cases that dealt with welfare.

Shapiro was not about the issue of welfare per se, but rather about the restrictions to the right to travel and possible violations of the Equal Protection Clause of the 14th Amendment. The question posed by Shapiro was whether Congress, in writing Section 602(b) of the Social Security Act, overstepped its regulating powers by giving states the ability to restrict travel. Although the Constitution does not explicitly mention the right to travel, it is implied by the other rights given in the Constitution. In 1969, 43 states had a residency requirement in effect, declared unconstitutional by Shapiro. Within those 43 states, it is estimated by the court that at least 100,000 people - minimum - were unable to get welfare aid. By 1970, there was a 17% increase in those nationally receiving AFDC aid due to Shapiro.

== Facts of the case ==
Vivian M. Thompson was a 19-year-old mother of one child and was pregnant with another. The case states that, due to her pregnancy, she was unable to work. Vivian M. Thompson moved from the Dorchester neighborhood of Boston, Massachusetts, to Hartford, Connecticut, in June 1966 to live with her mother. When her mother was no longer able to support her, Vivian and her infant son moved to her own apartment in Hartford in August 1966. The Legal Services Program (LSP), when seeking cases, looked for those that were both 'sympathetic' and likely to 'outrage' to argue in the Supreme Court. The situation of Vivian M. Thompson presented such a case in the eyes of the LSP.

In November 1966, the State of Connecticut Department of Welfare denied Aid to Families with Dependent Children (AFDC) benefits to Thompson due to Section 17-2d provision of the Connecticut General Statutes. Connecticut's provision, Section 17-2d, did not allow the state to provide welfare aid to any person who did not have residency in the state for at least a year before their application was filed. AFDC received funding from both the state and federal government, allowing Connecticut to create such a requirement. States such as Connecticut that receive federal funding for their welfare programs may have, at a maximum, a one-year residency period via Section 602(b) 42 of the Social Security Act.

== Background ==
The Legal Services Program (LSP) was created in 1965, as a department within the Office of Economic Opportunity. They provided counsel to primarily poor, working-class people and in the late 1960s focused on women's welfare issues. They brought 164 cases to the Supreme Court through 1966–1974. Their case work and dedication to shifting policy opened the door for cases such as Shapiro.

Shapiro v. Thompson was the second successful 'welfare test case' to change welfare rights in laws, policies, and procedures. The idea to shift welfare rights from a privilege to a legal right was suggested by Edward Sparer, considered the 'father of welfare law'. He served as the primary counsel for both NWRO, Center for Social Welfare Policy and Law (CSWPL), and was a member of the LSP through Columbia's Law School. The LSP used Sparer's intellectual framework to litigate 164 cases before the Supreme Court by 1974, providing legal support to primarily poor Americans and specifically poor mothers in shifting welfare policies. This form of 'legal civil disobedience', as Felicia Kornbluh a legal historian argues, was adopted from African American freedom movements and the NAACP's legal actions in desegregating schools.

The CSWPL was surprised that the District Court for the District of Connecticut sided with the LSP lawyers, and that the Supreme Court allowed it onto its docket in 1969. CSWPL believed there was little chance the Supreme Court would affirm, and that it was a lost cause. This led to the involvement of Edward Sparer, who brought in Archibald Cox as the lead attorney for the rehearing in 1968. Jacqueline Jones, a social historian, articulates that Archibald Cox's involvement with this case was coordinated. Sparer brought in Cox's legal assistance as he was the solicitor general, well-respected, and a recognized face by the Warren Court.

== District court for the district of Connecticut, civ. no. 11821 ==
Thompson v. Shapiro was argued in the United States District Court for the District of Connecticut, and the court's decision was rendered on June 19, 1967. The plaintiff (Thompson) was represented by Brian L. Hollander, while the defense (State of Connecticut) was represented by Francis J. MacGregor, the Assistant Attorney General for Connecticut. The case was heard before Judges T. Emmet Claire, Mosher Joseph Blumenfeld, and J. Joseph Smith, resulting in a 2–1 majority decision in the United States District Court for the District of Connecticut in favor of Thompson.

=== Opinion ===
The majority opinion, held by Judge Smith in favor of the plaintiff (Thompson), declared that residency waiting periods for welfare via Section 17-2d were unconstitutional under the Equal Protection Clause of the Fourteenth Amendment. The opinion stated that it "has a chilling effect on the right to travel". They believed that a one-year residency requirement had no 'permissible purpose' other than to discourage the movement of people who may seek welfare from moving to Connecticut. The United States Constitution holds that people may move from one place to another within the United States, and the Supreme Court has affirmed that this right may not be interfered with by states, as established in United States v. Guest.

Connecticut, in its own words in the Connecticut Welfare Manual, aimed to dissuade people who may need welfare from taking up residence in Connecticut, thus impeding their right to interstate travel. Hollander, representing the plaintiff, sought an injunction against Section 17-2d, asserting that its enforcement was unconstitutional. While states have the authority to regulate their own state aid programs, it was decided that Connecticut discriminated against Thompson arbitrarily.

=== Dissent ===
In the dissenting opinion, written by Judge Claire, he disagreed that Section 17-2d of the Connecticut General Statutes was unconstitutional. Judge Claire acknowledged that a state's regulation of any program might not be well-thought-out, but he argued that it is not the District Court's job to change. Connecticut is not the only state with a residency requirement, and Congress has stated through the Social Security Act, Section 602(b) (42 U.S.C.A.), that a maximum one-year residency requirement for state welfare is legally approved. Claire also stated that Edwards v. People of State of California does not have standing in relation to this case, nor does it have any arbitrary effects on the right to residency in Connecticut.

== Supreme Court hearing, 394 U.S. 618, 89 S. ct. 1322, 22 l.ed.2d 600 (1969) ==
Shapiro v. Thompson was first heard on May 1, 1968, and reargued in the second hearing on October 23-24th, 1968.

=== Timeline for hearing #1 ===
Timeline was created from Jordan Lampo's legal article The Last Days of the Warren Court: How Justice Brennan Orchestrated Shapiro v. Thompson (1969). Jordan Lampo explained, detailed and listed in chronological order all internal Supreme Court documents related to the Shapiro v. Thompson decision.

- May 1, 1968: Hearing #1 started on May 1 with a focus on the Social Security Act statute allowing states the ability to restrict travel.
- May 3, 1968: After the conclusion of arguments in Hearing #1, the Supreme Court's initial vote was 5-4 in favor of reversing the lower court's decision. Justice Warren, in the majority as Chief Justice, would assign the majority opinion. Jordan Lampo notes that Justice Brennan asked not to be assigned the opinion, and Warren would take on this task himself.
- June 5–11, 1968: Both Justice Douglas and Fortas circulated a brief for the dissent arguing for affirmation the lower court. Justice Harlen circulated a brief for the majority's opinion for reversal. Justice Brennan co-signed Justice Fortas's circulated brief for the dissent - switching his view.
- June 13–17, 1968: The last conference of the term would be held, marking the end of the term. Shapiro v. Thompson was put on hold until Hearing #2 and rearguments could occur during the Supreme Court's new term in October.
- June 26, 1968: Justice Warren officially announced his retirement upon the confirmation of Justice Fortas as the new Chief Justice.
- July 3, 1968: The Senate voted not to confirm Justice Fortas as Chief Justice of the Supreme Court due to political allegations.
- October 11, 1968: President Johnson withdrew Justice Fortas's name, and a new nominee was not put forward. Justice Warren agreed to remain as Chief Justice through the next term, leading him to be involved in the decision-making process for Shapiro v. Thompson.

=== Timeline for hearing #2 ===
- October 23–24, 1968: Hearing #2 would occur over two days.
- October 28, 1968: After the closing arguments, the initial conference was held, and the Justices voted to affirm the lower court's decision 5–3. Justice Douglas, as the most senior in the majority, assigned the majority opinion to Justice Brennan. Jordan Lampo suggests that the decision to assign the opinion to Justice Brennan instead of Justice Fortas was influenced by the withdrawal and controversy surrounding Justice Fortas's nomination as Chief Justice.
- December 2, 1968: Justice Brennan circulated his first draft of the majority's opinion to affirm. This draft would be co-signed by Justices Douglas, Stewart, Fortas, and Marshall. There was a focus on Cox's argument concerning fundamental rights, but Brennan argued in favor of a strict standard of review. Justice Stewart, on the other hand, advocated for a rational basis review.
  - Justice Brennan responded to Justice Stewart in a memo, hoping to persuade him to affirm Shapiro. In this memo, Brennan cited Carrington v. Rash (1965), a case for which Justice Stewart wrote the majority opinion. In Carrington v. Rash (1965), Justice Stewart advocated for and applied a stricter standard of review when statutes or laws burden or restrict the 'fundamental right to vote.' Brennan, using Cox's argument, contended that any administrative benefit did not outweigh fundamental human rights. Ultimately, Justice Stewart agreed with the use of Carrington v. Rash and the application of a stricter standard of review.
- January 7 - February 17, 1969: Justice Stewart officially joined the majority opinion, co-signing Justice Brennan's majority opinion. Justice Harlan circulated three dissent briefs to reverse the lower court's holding. Harlan stated that a strict standard of review should only be used in cases of discrimination based on race. He also argued that Brennan's majority opinion focused more on the issues of fundamental rights put forth by Cox in his oral arguments than on the issue of interstate travel.
- February 21, 1969: In response to Justice Harlan's three dissenting briefs, Justice White officially voted to affirm the lower court's decision.
- February 22 - March 1, 1969: Justice Stewart initially intended to write an official response to Harlan's briefs but, for personal reasons, later delegated the task to Justice Marshall. Justice Warren stated that he would neither vote nor respond until Marshall and Stewart had stated their official opinions.
- March 1, 1969: Congress voted to give a significant increase to federal judges' salaries. Jordan Lampo argues that this salary increase was the reason Stewart and Marshall delayed their official opinions to avoid repercussions during congressional voting.
- March 6, 1969: Justice Stewart circulated a brief in response to Justice Harlan and in agreement with Justice Brennan. Justice Marshall then co-signed Stewart's brief, affirming that it represented his official opinion.
- March 7–25, 1969: Justice Warren appealed to Justice Brennan to leave open the question of Congress's power to set residency requirements, limiting the Shapiro decision to only Connecticut. He suggested that this could be achieved if Justice Brennan removed a paragraph on page 22 of his majority opinion. If Justice Brennan removed section 22, Justice Warren would then vote with the majority, strengthening Brennan's opinion.
- March 25–26, 1969: Warren circulated a brief for the majority, stating that Congress's power to set residency requirements was still open to debate with the removal of section 22, resulting in a possible 7–2 vote in favor of the majority. Justice Fortas officially stated that removing the paragraph on page 22 would not leave open Congress's power to set residency requirements. This opinion was co-signed by Justices White, Stewart, and Harlan. In internal memos, Brennan made it clear that he did not believe that by removing the paragraph on page 22, it would leave open Congress's power to set residency requirements. However, he removed the section to gain Warren's vote.
- March 28, 1969: Justice Douglas circulated a brief in response to Justice Warren, restating Justice Fortas's opinion regarding the removal of the paragraph on page 22. He argued that even with its removal, Justice Brennan's majority holding, still clearly showed Congress could not create laws enabling states to set residency requirements for welfare benefits. This opinion was co-signed by Justices White, Fortas, Stewart, and Marshall. Justice Douglas's brief led to Justice Brennan reinstating the paragraph on page 22, at which point both Justices Douglas and Warren officially withdrew their previous briefs regarding the paragraph.
- April 3, 1969: Justice Warren wrote the official dissent, citing Street v. New York (1969) in his opinion. At that time, Street v. New York was still under argument before the Supreme Court. Due to procedural reasons, Thompson v. Shapiro had to be placed on hold until the official opinion of Street v. New York (1969) was released. Justice Brennan, with the cosign of the majority, asked Justice Warren to remove the Street v. New York (1969) citation, but Warren refused to do so.
- April 21: The holding of Street v. New York (1969) was officially released, and Shapiro v. Thompson would be decided with a final 6–3 vote in favor of the majority to affirm.

=== Majority ===
The majority opinion was written by Justice Brennan and decided on April 21, 1969. In the majority opinion, themes of equal opportunity, mobility through free movement, and liberty were foundational to the reasoning that Justice Brennan employed. The Court rejected the argument that Congress had the power to authorize residency requirements, as it was a violation of the equal protection clause. Justice Brennan cited sections of the District Court for the District of Connecticut, Civ. No. 11821 decision in regards to the violations of the equal protection clause. The State of Connecticut argued in every hearing that residency requirements would make planning a budget more predictable, citing administrative justification. In response, Cox cites "South's Relief Aid Sends Many North" by Peter Kihss, as evidence that states were not reducing their administrative or financial burden in the limitation of welfare. That data supporting welfare aid, as cited by Cox, would later be referenced to by Justice Brennan when convincing Justice Stewart to vote to affirm Shapiro v. Thompson and in his final holding.

Cox's shift to the idea of 'fundamental rights' was to lessen the concerns and arguments brought up by the Justices, such as voting rights and college tuition. They were not as clarified by Cox as not being 'fundamental rights' that welfare supports. Cox defined fundamental human rights as food, shelter, water, freedom, etc. This would be foundational to Justice Brennan's holding, as there is a reliance on 'fundamental rights' to defend welfare.

Justice Brennan included the parts of Archibald Cox's oral arguments in the foundation of his reasoning. The Supreme Court did not need to make new constitutional opinions in affirming Shapiro but instead should be "condemning discrimination". Jacqueline Jones summarized Cox's argument as in-staters discriminating against out-of-staters and strangers. Within this argument, Cox stressed the privileges and immunities component to the right to travel within the Fourteenth Amendment, as states are constitutionally forbidden from discriminating against those from another state. There was also ample evidence submitted to the court that this form of discrimination was occurring via the Connecticut Welfare Manual, and by the Iowa amicus curiae brief submitted by Lorna Lawhead Williams. That brief asserted that states are obligated to take care of their own poor, not the poor of another state. Both of these were directly referenced by Justice Brennan when justifying the majority's reasoning to cite the compelling interest theory.

Justice Brennan cited the 'compelling interest' theory as he argued that Shapiro v. Thompson, being an issue of discrimination, allowed a standard of strict scrutiny to be applied. Justice Brennan would also take Justice Stewart's suggestion to cite States v. Guest (1966) in relation to both state violations of the Fourteenth Amendment in regards to the right to travel and discrimination.

=== Dissents ===
==== Justice Warren & Justice Black ====
Chief Justice Warren wrote the dissent and was joined by Justice Black. Justice Warren argued simply that, under its enumerated powers, Congress had the right to authorize States to set residency requirements. Thus, all residency requirements, including Connecticut's residency requirement (Section 17-2d), were constitutional. Justice Warren, in his reading of the Constitution, surmised that the Social Security Act represented a form of "cooperative federalism" during the New Deal period, aimed at easing the burden on states. Therefore, states must have the power to regulate their own welfare system with the assistance of the Federal government, comparing it to an issue of commerce. Under the commerce clause, Congress needs only a rational basis for a legitimate state interest, not a necessary relation to a compelling interest.

Justice Warren stated that Congress wanted to encourage and support States in running their own welfare systems, allowing States to take primary financial responsibility with federal help for their own welfare systems. States were often unwilling to increase welfare to help their citizens without residency requirements. Having a completely open policy may lead to a lack of funding and resources if their packages were increased with inflation. In response to the creation of welfare programs, acts, and legislation, Congress agreed that residency requirements were needed. Justice Warren cites that in 1935, there were welfare residency requirements under the Social Security Act directly set by Congress for the District of Columbia. In his own words, Justice Warren was convinced that any burden residency requirements put onto interstate travel was justified. Justice Warren did not agree with the majority's assertion that the burden was too great. Congress has enacted many restrictions on interstate travel, in the form of taxes, safety regulations, and a number of criminal-based statutes. Justice Warren quoted Justice Cardozo, citing Helvering v. Davis (1937), in his conclusion, echoing Judge Claire of the District Court for the District of Connecticut:

"Whether wisdom or unwisdom resides in the scheme of benefits set forth . . . is not for us to say. The answer to such inquiries must come from Congress, not the courts. Our concern here, as often, is with power, not with wisdom".

==== Justice Harlan ====
Justice Harlan also dissented, stating that he disagreed with the Majority opinion's reasoning and results. He argued that the Majority's usage of equal protection under the Fourteenth Amendment is a significant exception to the pre-established understanding that any legitimate government interest, in and of itself, does not challenge equal protection.

The idea of a 'compelling interest' that overrides a legitimate government interest is not only new but had increasingly expanded in the court: first race (racial discrimination), second political allegiance, and now majority's opinion hopes to include wealth (restrictions on the poor). The inclusion of wealth in the idea of a 'compelling interest,' in Justice Harlan's words, is unfortunate, as it should only be used in cases of racial discrimination. Justice Harlan states that the usage of a 'fundamental right' as the basis for a strict standard of review is both arbitrary and undefined. Justice Harlan questions what a 'fundamental right' is and how far it extends. To strike down any law, statute, act, or idea that restricts a 'fundamental right' waters down the equal protection clause and the Fourteenth Amendment.

== Legacy and Legal Significance ==
Shapiro v. Thompson, the second successful 'welfare test case' which played a pivotal role in reshaping welfare rights laws, policies, and procedures. Edward Sparer, often regarded as the 'father of welfare law,' proposed the transformative idea to shift welfare rights from a privilege to a legal right. As the primary counsel for NWRO and a key member of the LSP through Columbia's Law School, Sparer's intellectual framework guided the litigation of 164 cases before the Supreme Court by 1974. This concerted effort provided crucial legal support, particularly to poor Americans and mothers, influencing the evolution of welfare policies.

In the late 1960s through the late 1970s, there was a $300 million to $400 million increase in public assistance across the United States, credited by legal scholars to 'The Welfare Cases'. The legacy of these court decisions is evident in their later usage through citation. Susan E. Lawrence notes that from 1967 to 1983, Shapiro v. Thompson was cited the most out of all other welfare cases before the Warren Court. There were 139 citations by the Supreme Court, 982 by the Lower Federal Court, 1006 by State Court Citations, 7 by Con Law Texts, and 16 in National Law Reviews. However, by the late 1970s-80s, welfare and any form of guaranteed income fell to the wayside as public opinion shifted against welfare. Felicia Kornbluh argues that welfare has since been unable to catch the national attention as it did in 1969, Shapiro v. Thompson was simply a product of its time.

=== Social Impact ===
Karen Tani wrote that 'The Welfare Cases', being affirmed by the Supreme Court reframed welfare law and policy in America, restoring rights that had been stripped from welfare recipients. This belief was prevalent at the time, emphasizing the argument that welfare was a right, and its recipients were now rights holders. Activists purposefully advocated for the idea that welfare was a right, aiming to shift the attitudes and views of federal and agency workers, social workers, and society towards those on welfare. The 'win' in cases like Shapiro v. Thompson spurred on activists.

There was a significant financial impact. Susan Lawrence calculated that there was a $400 to $500 million per year increase in welfare benefits. From 1967 to 1971 alone, there was an increase from $7.8 billion to $17.7 billion.

Welfare case decisions came directly before an economic crisis in America in the 1970s.

=== Legal Impact ===
Through the 1970s, three-quarters of the Supreme Court's docket dealt with civil rights and liberty cases, akin to Shapiro v. Thompson. Groups like the LSP found success in their legal strategy, not only getting cases to the Supreme Court but also having them affirmed. Shapiro had an immediate legal impact, cited as the basis for affirming Dunn v. Blumstein, 405 U.S. 330 (1972), which struck down a one-year residency requirement before someone could vote as a resident in Tennessee. Furthermore, in Memorial Hospital v. Maricopa County, 415 U.S. 250 (1974), the Supreme Court struck down a one-year residency requirement in Arizona to receive nonemergency medical aid paid for by the state. For the most part, the Supreme Court has struck down all residency requirements for public aid and government matters, with the exception of Sosna v. Iowa, 419 U.S. 393 (1975), where the Court upheld a one-year residency requirement for filing for divorce, recognizing states' protected interest in domestic matters.

The closest the Supreme Court has come to overturning Shapiro v. Thompson was in 1995 with Anderson v. Green, 513 U.S. 557 (1994). California Welfare & Instate Code Annotation Section 11450.03(b) (West Supp.1994) instituted a one-year residency requirement for welfare aid, violating Shapiro v. Thompson. Both lower courts in California affirmed that it violated Shapiro v. Thompson and granted an injunction. Due to a procedural issue, California's residency requirement never went into effect, creating no justiciable controversy and no actual issue for the court to rule on. California received a waiver from the Secretary of Health and Human Services to sidestep Shapiro v. Thompson, making the residency requirement pseudo-legal. This waiver was challenged by Beno v. Shalala, 30 F.3d 1057, 1073–1076 (CA9 1994). In its holding, the court stated that the Secretary of HHS had not adequately considered public comment on the issue and invalidated the waiver. Beno v. Shalala was not appealed, rendering the waiver null and void, consequently voiding California's residency requirement. Since the residency requirement could never go into effect, there was no legal issue for the court to rule on.

Edelman v. Jordan, 415 U.S. 651, 94 S.Ct. 1347, 39 L.Ed.2d 662 (1974), took a negative view on Shapiro v. Thompson but did not directly overrule it.
