= Serrano v. Priest =

Serrano v. Priest refers to three cases regarding the financing of public schools in California that were decided by the California Supreme Court: Serrano v. Priest, 5 Cal.3d 584 (1971) (Serrano I); Serrano v. Priest, 18 Cal.3d 728 (1976) (Serrano II); and Serrano v. Priest, 20 Cal.3d 25 (1977) (Serrano III).

== The Serrano cases ==
=== Serrano I (1971) ===
Initiated in 1968 in the Superior Court of Los Angeles County, Serrano v. Priest (John Serrano was a parent of one of several Los Angeles public school students; Ivy Baker Priest was the California State Treasurer at the time) set forth three causes of action (quotes from the decision).

1. "[As] a direct result of the financing scheme they are required to pay a higher tax rate than [taxpayers] in many other school districts in order to obtain for their children the same or lesser educational opportunities afforded children in those other districts."
2. "[That] an actual controversy has arisen and now exists between the parties as to the validity and constitutionality of the financing scheme under the Fourteenth Amendment of the United States Constitution and under the California Constitution."

In an opinion by Justice Raymond L. Sullivan, the Court agreed with the plaintiffs, largely on equal-protection grounds, and returned the case to the trial court for further proceedings.

As Sullivan summarizes, "We are called upon to determine whether the California public school financing system, with its substantial dependence on local property taxes and resultant wide disparities in school revenue, violates the equal protection clause of the Fourteenth Amendment. We have determined that this funding scheme invidiously discriminates against the poor because it makes the quality of a child's education a function of the wealth of his parents and neighbors. Recognizing as we must that the right to an education in our public schools is a fundamental interest which cannot be conditioned on wealth, we can discern no compelling state purpose necessitating the present method of financing. We have concluded, therefore, that such a system cannot withstand constitutional challenge and must fall before the equal protection clause."

=== Serrano II (1976) ===
In San Antonio Independent School District v. Rodriguez (1973), the Supreme Court of the United States reversed a similar decision by a Texas District Court, which, like Serrano I, had been decided on Fourteenth Amendment equal-protection grounds. In Serrano I, however, the California Supreme Court had relied in addition on California's constitution, and in Serrano II they affirmed that basis, protecting the Serrano decisions from Rodriguez.

The Serrano II decision also held that the legislative response to Serrano I was insufficient, and affirmed the trial court's order requiring that wealth-based funding disparities between district be reduced to less than $100 by 1980.

=== Serrano III (1977) ===
Serrano III dealt primarily with attorneys' fees, but in passing affirmed the trial court's response to the Serrano II decision, including a six-year timetable for bringing the funding system into compliance.

=== Proposition 13 ===
The California State Legislature's response to Serrano I and Serrano II was significantly constrained by the passage of Proposition 13 in 1978, which reduced property-tax revenues and imposed a 2/3-majority vote requirement for statewide tax increases. The initial property-tax-based solution was replaced by a funding scheme that relied more heavily on state (as opposed to district) revenue, which has remained in effect, with occasional adjustments, ever since.

== Compliance (1983) ==
In 1983, the Los Angeles County Superior Court found, on remand, that the requirements of Serrano II had been sufficiently met, allowing a relatively small number of residual districts to retain a higher level of funding, based on well-above-average local property taxes.

== See also ==
- San Antonio Independent School District v. Rodriguez (Texas)
- Edgewood Independent School District v. Kirby (Texas)
- Abbott v. Burke (New Jersey)
