= Shuttlesworth v. City of Birmingham =

- Supreme Court of the United States

Argued October 18, 1968 Decided March 10, 1969
- Full case name: Shuttlesworth v. Birmingham
- Citations: 394 U.S. 147 (more) 89 S. Ct. 935; 22 L. Ed. 2d 162

Holding
- The Court held that (1) even though the actual construction of § 1159 of the Birmingham General City Code was unconstitutional, the judicial construction of the ordinance prohibited only standing or loitering on public property that obstructed free passage, but it was unclear from the record, whether the literal or judicial construction was applied; and (2) the literal construction of § 1159 of the Birmingham General City Code was unconstitutional, and the statutory application revealed that it applied to the enforcement of an officer's order in directing vehicular traffic.

Court membership
- Chief Justice Earl Warren Associate Justices Hugo Black · William O. Douglas; John M. Harlan II · William J. Brennan Jr. Potter Stewart · Byron White; Abe Fortas · Thurgood Marshall

Case opinions
- Majority: Stewart, joined by Warren, Black, Douglas, Brennan, White, Fortas
- Concurrence: Harlan
- Marshall took no part in the consideration or decision of the case.

Laws applied
- U.S. Const. amend. XIV

Shuttlesworth v. Birmingham, 394 U.S. 147 (1969), was a United States Supreme Court case in which the Supreme Court struck down a Birmingham, Alabama ordinance that prohibited citizens from holding parades and processions on city streets without first obtaining a permit.

== Background ==
The petitioner was Reverend Fred Shuttlesworth, an African American minister who helped lead 52 African Americans in an orderly civil rights march in Birmingham, Alabama, in 1963. He was arrested and convicted for violating section 1159 of the city's General Code, an ordinance which proscribes participating in any parade or procession on city streets or public ways without first obtaining a permit from the City Commission. Section 1159 permits the Commission to refuse a parade permit if its members believe "the public welfare, peace, safety, health, decency, good order, morals or convenience require that it be refused." Shuttleworth had previously been given to understand by a member of the commission that under no circumstances would petitioner and his group be allowed to demonstrate in Birmingham. The Alabama Court of Appeals reversed the conviction on the grounds, inter alia, that 1159, as written, unconstitutionally imposed an "invidious prior restraint" without ascertainable standards for the granting of permits, and that the ordinance had been discriminatorily enforced. However, the Alabama Supreme Court in 1967 narrowly construed 1159 as an objective, even-handed traffic regulation which did not allow the Commission unlimited discretion in granting or withholding permits, and upheld petitioner's conviction. The case was taken to the US Supreme Court, where Shuttlesworth was represented by the prominent civil rights attorney James Nabrit III.

== Opinion of the court ==
Writing for the court, Justice Potter Stewart held that (1) even though the actual construction of § 1159 of the Birmingham General City Code was unconstitutional, the judicial construction of the ordinance prohibited only standing or loitering on public property that obstructed free passage, but it was unclear from the record, whether the literal or judicial construction was applied; and (2) the literal construction of § 1159 of the Birmingham General City Code was unconstitutional, and the statutory application revealed that it applied to the enforcement of an officer's order in directing vehicular traffic. Even though Justice Stewart's opinion for the Court mentioned that "the Supreme Court of Alabama performed a remarkable job of plastic surgery upon the face of the ordinance", the Court reversed Shuttlesworth's conviction because the circumstances indicated that the parade permit was denied not to control traffic, but to censor ideas.

== See also ==
- List of United States Supreme Court cases, volume 394
- Brown v. Board of Education
- Birmingham campaign
