= Robin Hood plan =

Provision within a Texas state law

The Robin Hood Plan is a colloquialism given to a provision of Texas Senate Bill 7 (73rd Texas Legislature) (the provision is officially referred to as "recapture"), originally enacted by the U.S. state of Texas in 1993 (and revised frequently since then) to provide equity of school financing within all school districts in the state of Texas. The plan is now codified within the Texas Education Code as Section 49.002.

The original bill was passed in response to numerous court rulings (both Federal and state, notably the Texas Supreme Court's ruling in Edgewood Independent School District v. Kirby) that previous financing schemes were in violation of the Texas Constitution's requirements regarding what constitutes "an efficient system of public free schools" as that provision interacts with another provision prohibiting a statewide ad valorem property tax. Though the legislation has been revised since then, its basic premise remains the same: it limits both the amounts that school districts can both spend on public schools and the amounts that they can raise through locally assessed property taxes and further requires that any amounts in excess be "recaptured" by the state and given to other districts which are unable to raise the required revenue.

== Constitutional and Statutory Requirements ==
Article 7, Section 1, of the Texas Constitution states:

A general diffusion of knowledge being essential to the preservation of the liberties and rights of the people, it shall be the duty of the Legislature of the State to establish and make suitable provision for the support and maintenance of an efficient system of public free schools.

However, state funding is constrained, in part, by Article 8, Section 1-e, of the Texas Constitution, which states:

No State ad valorem taxes shall be levied upon any property within this State.

As such, and because Texas has no personal income tax (which it repeatedly mentions when encouraging businesses and individuals to relocate), the Legislature has been required to provide other sources of dedicated revenue for to fund public education. Some of the more prominent ones are:

- Dedicating specified proceeds from the Permanent School Fund (which are transferred into the Available School Fund)
- Dedicating 25% of all motor fuels taxes collected
- Dedicating 25% of all business occupational taxes collected
- Dedicating net proceeds (after payout of prizes, operating costs, and specified transfers for veterans' assistance) from the Texas Lottery

Otherwise, outside of other minor dedicated revenue sources, public education funding is primarily provided by Legislative appropriations, and a school district's ability to assess property taxes in amounts sufficient to provide an adequate education. The ability of local school districts, specifically those which are "property poor", when considered in conjunction with the Constitutional requirement to provide an adequate education and the prohibition against a statewide property tax, have formed the bases for the numerous lawsuits against the State of Texas, claiming violations.

=== Local Property Taxes in Texas ===
Property taxes in Texas consist of two components:

- The largest component is for maintenance and operations (M&O). This portion of the tax rate funds teacher, administrative, and other district employee salaries, educational materials used in classrooms, utilities, and routine facility maintenance including minor construction projects. M&O rates consist of two tiers of funding:
  - Tier I funding is based on a series of state-mandated funding amounts. The predominant one is the per-student allotment (set at $6,160/student as of 2023; the amount is set by statute and notably is not indexed for inflation, which has been the subject of much political debate within Texas), which is then multiplied by a series of weights depending on the student's educational level and other factors. Additional amounts are provided for student success and to cover transportation costs. The sum of all these amounts is then compared to a state-mandated funding cap (calculated as the taxable value of all property within a district – regardless of whether the property can be taxed at full value or even at all – multiplied by the maximum compressed rate, or MCR). Amounts below the calculated sum are made up by the state; amounts in excess are subject to recapture. (Funds received from federal sources—such as payments in lieu of taxes (PILOTs) for Federal land holdings within a district (such as an Army Corps of Engineers lake) or Federal funding for child nutrition programs, along with any private donations received, are not subject to recapture.)
  - School districts then have the option to increase the tax rate by up to $0.17/$100 above their MCR to provide "Tier II Enrichment" funding. The funding can only be used for M&O, not for capital projects. The funding consists of two levels, each resulting in differing levels of funding, requiring different levels of approval, and differing in their interplay with recapture:
    - A district can propose an increase of up to $0.08/$100 above the MCR. This rate provides a guaranteed yield ($7.9 million as of 2023). If the tax increase does not provide the stated yield, the state makes up the difference; if the tax increase results in more than the yield, it is not subject to recapture (thus it is often referred to colloquially as "golden pennies"). The district's board can increase the rate by up to five "golden pennies" solely on its own action by majority vote; the remaining three pennies require voter approval in what is officially termed a Voter Approved Tax-Rate Ratification Election or VATRE (pronounced "vater"). Once the voters approve a VATRE, the board can continue to assess at the approved rate without further voter approval (unless less than the maximum three pennies were approved).
    - After assessing the maximum eight "golden pennies", a district can then propose up to an additional $0.09/$100 above the MCR. This rate provides a lower, non-guaranteed yield ($3.9 million as of 2023) and is subject to recapture (thus it is often referred to colloquially as "copper pennies"). These pennies require voter approval via VATRE (it can be combined with a VATRE for "golden pennies", and again does not require further voter approval unless less than the maximum nine pennies were approved).
- The final component of the tax rate is for "interest and sinking fund" (I&S). These funds allow districts to issue bonds for major improvements such as land acquisition, new or major renovations to schools, technology purchases (computers and supporting infrastructure) or performing arts centers and/or sports facilities, and can only be used for such, not for M&O. These funds are not subject to recapture but are capped at $0.50/$100, except that if the district's property value would fall to a level where the maximum rate would not prevent default, the cap can be exceeded.
  - Prior to 2019, districts in Texas would frequently combine all desired capital improvements into one bond package. Since voters grew tired of having bond money for schools tied to a district's desire for a state-of-the-art football stadium (notwithstanding the popularity of high school football in Texas), the law was changed to require sports facilities to be separate proposals from general school items.

== Lawsuits and Legislative Actions ==
School finance lawsuits must take place in state court, since the U.S. Supreme Court ruled in 1973 that education is not a fundamental right protected by the U.S. Constitution (San Antonio v. Rodriguez, a case which originated in Texas). However, in response, between 1975 and 1977 the Legislature increased the minimum teacher salary schedule and increased the number of instructional days required.

=== Edgewood I ===
The first of the initial four lawsuits (all of which would involve the Edgewood Independent School District of Bexar County, Texas, a low-income school district in San Antonio) which would ultimately give rise to Robin Hood would be filed in May 1984 against then state Commissioner of Education William Kirby by the Mexican American Legal Defense and Educational Fund, citing discrimination against students in poor school districts. Edgewood ISD charged that the state's methods of funding public schools, which resulted in a wide variation of funding between districts, violated the Texas Constitution. The Texas Supreme Court would rule in October 1989 that the funding mechanisms in place were in violation of the Texas Constitution, ruling that an "efficient system" required "substantially equal access to similar levels of revenue per pupil at similar levels of tax effort".

In response, the Legislature passed legislation increasing the state's basic allotment and guaranteed yield to provide equalization at the 95th percentile, but specifically excluded the state's most "property wealthy" districts from the requirements.

=== Edgewood II ===
The exclusion of the wealthiest school districts from the requirement led Edgewood ISD to again file suit against Commissioner Kirby, this time in September 1990. Once again, the Texas Supreme Court ruled in the district's favor, determining in January 1991 that excluding the wealthy districts made the legislation unconstitutional. One month later, the Court would later issue a (rare) "advisory opinion", stating that once the Legislature created an "efficient system", it may authorize local enrichment upon voter approval.

The Legislature responded by creating 188 "County Education Districts", designed to equalize the tax base by consolidating property-wealthy districts with property-poor ones.

=== Edgewood III ===
The creation of the County Education Districts would lead Edgewood ISD into court yet again. But this time, it would be the defendant in a June 1991 suit brought by the Carrollton-Farmers Branch Independent School District (a district north of Dallas), which argued that the districts were unconstitutional. The Court would rule in January 1992, agreeing that the districts were unconstitutional.

The Legislature responded by proposing a constitutional amendment to allow for the "County Education Districts"; however, the amendment was rejected by voters. It also passed Senate Bill 7 with the "Robin Hood" aspect. Senate Bill 7 also, for the first time, introduced a state-mandated limit on M&O tax rates, capping them at $1.50/$100 valuation, which would later become the subject of its own court battle.

Under recapture, a "property wealthy" district finding itself with more tax revenue than allowed, could choose from one of five options (or combinations thereof) to reduce or eliminate the amount owed:

1. Consolidate with a "property poor" district (thus resulting in only one remaining district),
2. Detach a portion of its tax base and transfer it to a "property poor" district,
3. Purchase “attendance credits” from the state which provides the district with a sufficient number of students to reduce the district's local revenue level to a level that is equal to or less than the district's entitlement,
4. Contract with a "property poor" district to educate a sufficient number of non-resident students to provide the district with a sufficient number of students to reduce the district's local revenue level to a level that is equal to or less than the district's entitlement, or
5. Consolidate tax bases with a "property poor" district (but not the districts themselves).

No school district has ever chosen Options 1, 2, or 5 to avoid recapture. Every district has chosen Options 3 or 4 or a combination of the two.

=== Edgewood IV ===
The Robin Hood plan would face yet another court challenge in June 1993, this time by two different sets of parties arguing two opposite positions:

- Edgewood ISD (along with "property poor" districts) argued that the plan still didn't accomplish constitutional requirements.
- On the other side, a group of "property wealthy" districts argued that the recapture mechanism was, itself, unconstitutional.

In January 1995 the Texas Supreme Court would, for a time, end the ongoing battle over school finance, ruling that the Robin Hood plan met constitutional requirements.

=== West Orange-Cove cases ===
After Edgewood IV the courts would see a roughly six-year break in the ongoing battle over school finance.

However, the state-mandated M&O cap (at which the majority of school districts were assessing taxes) would become the source of the next round of lawsuits, this time by the West Orange-Cove Consolidated Independent School District (located in southeast Texas). The district filed suit in April 2001, arguing that the mandated cap constituted a de facto, and thus unconstitutional, state property tax, because the district had no "meaningful discretion" in setting the tax rate.

The Texas Supreme Court agreed in November 2005 with the district (West Orange-Cove I). In response, the Legislature met in a special session during April and May 2006, and made several changes to the tax structure:

- The Legislature "compressed" (reduced) the maximum M&O rate to $1.00/$100.
- It replaced the lost local revenue with additional state funding, primarily by state revenue from a new business tax and higher cigarette taxes.
- Finally, it allowed local districts the option to assess up to an additional $0.17/$100—the "golden pennies" and "copper pennies" discussed above.

Upon passage of the legislation, the district and the state agreed to dissolve a second case (West Orange-Cove II) which was ongoing at the time.

The Texas Comptroller estimated a five-year $23 billion shortfall from the revised tax system.

=== Texas Taxpayer & Student Fairness Coalition ===
The West Orange-Cove settlement would bring another six-year break in the battle, only to then be followed by a consortium of plaintiffs under the name shown above (notably over half the state's school districts, along with individual taxpayers and business groups), once again suing (in October 2011) that the compressed rate—even with increased state funding and the optional 17 cent rate—was still a de facto state property tax.

A Travis County district judge agreed in a February 2013 bench ruling that the system was unconstitutional based on equity, adequacy, and the creation of a de facto state property tax. After a rehearing in early 2014, the judge issued his formal ruling in August of that year, generally holding to his bench ruling, but that the system did not violate the "taxpayer equity" requirements of the state constitution.

However, the Texas Supreme Court (on direct appeal) would overrule the district court's ruling in May 2016, stating that the system (though "flawed and imperfect") met constitutional requirements. Notably, for the first time, the Court's opinion would state multiple times that the determination of a school finance system was the province of the Legislature, not the Court, and that going forward it would defer to the legislative choices unless any were "arbitrary and unreasonable".

Since May 2016 no significant challenges to the structure have been brought. The Legislature, meanwhile, has continued to compress the maximum M&O rate, but changed the determination from a state-wide cap to a district-specific calculation.

== See also ==
- Serrano v. Priest (California)
- Abbott v. Burke (New Jersey)
- Redistributive change

== Resources ==
- Robin Hood Plan is Working World Internet News
- "EDGEWOOD ISD V. KIRBY". The Handbook of Texas Online. Retrieved 27 October 2008.
- Schools and Taxes: A Summary of Legislation of the 2006 Special Session
- An Introduction to School Finance in Texas (Fifth Edition, Revised March 2022), TTARA Research Foundation (TTARA).
