= Martha Davis (author) =

American academic (born 1957)

Martha F. Davis (born 1957) is a professor of law at Northeastern University in Boston. She authored the book Brutal Need, a study of the welfare rights movement of 1960 to 1973.

== Early life and education ==
Davis is a native of Kansas. She holds an A.B. in anthropology, magna cum laude from Harvard College (1979), a B.A. and M.A. from Trinity College, Oxford, and a J.D. from University of Chicago Law School where she was a member of its Law Review.

== Career ==
After graduating law school she served as a law clerk to U.S. District Court Judge James Moody from 1983 to 1985. She then became an associate at the law firm Cleary, Gottlieb, Steen & Hamilton LLP and was a visiting staff attorney at MFY Legal Services.

In 1993 she joined NOW Legal Defense and Education Fund as a staff attorney until being promoted to Vice President and Legal Director in 1996. Davis was counsel in six U.S. Supreme Court cases including arguing Nguyen v. INS, 533 U.S. 53 (2001).

Davis joined the faculty at Northeastern University School of Law in 2002. She has written widely on human rights, federalism, and women's rights.

== Publications ==
Books

- Global Urban Justice: The Rise of Human Rights Cities (2016; co-edited with Barbara Oomen and Michele Grigolo)
- Human Rights Advocacy in the United States (2014; co-author with Risa Kaufman and Johanna Kalb)
- Bringing Human Rights Home (2008; co-edited with Cynthia Soohoo and Cathy Albisa)
- Brutal Need: Lawyers and the Welfare Rights Movement, 1960-1973 (1993)
