= Frazier v. Cupp =

- Supreme Court of the United States

Argued February 26, 1969 Decided April 22, 1969
- Full case name: Frazier v. Cupp
- Citations: 394 U.S. 731 (more) 89 S. Ct. 1420; 22 L. Ed. 2d 684

Holding
- On its own, police deception in interrogations did not automatically constitute misconduct.

Court membership
- Chief Justice Earl Warren Associate Justices Hugo Black · William O. Douglas; John M. Harlan II · William J. Brennan Jr. Potter Stewart · Byron White; Abe Fortas · Thurgood Marshall

Case opinion
- Majority: Marshall, joined by Warren, Black, Douglas, Harlan, Brennan, Stewart, White
- Fortas took no part in the consideration or decision of the case.

Laws applied
- U.S. Const. amend. VI

Frazier v. Cupp, 394 U.S. 731 (1969), was a United States Supreme Court case that affirmed the legality of deceptive interrogation tactics by the police.

== Background ==
Acting on a tip, police picked up and interrogated Martin E. Frazier, a 20-year-old U.S. Marine, about his possible involvement in the murder of Russell Anton Marleau. Frazier, along with his cousin, Jerry Lee Rawls, were seen at a bar with the victim before the murder.

During the interrogation, police falsely informed Frazier that Rawls had already confessed and implicated him in the murder. Frazier denied any involvement in the crime and suggested speaking with an attorney, but police continued to question him. Police elicited a confession, which was used against him at trial.

Frazier was convicted of the murder of Russell Anton Marleau. Rawls pleaded guilty to the same offense.

== Arguments during appeal ==
Frazier appealed his conviction to the United States Supreme Court on three main points.

1. The defense argued Frazier was denied his Sixth Amendment right to cross-examine the prosecution's witness, Rawls, because Rawls refused to answer questions after the prosecution referenced elements from his prior statements to police.
2. The defense claimed, under Escobedo v. Illinois and Miranda v. Arizona, Frazier was denied his right to counsel during his interrogation because questioning continued after he suggested speaking with an attorney. The defense also claimed Frazier's confession was involuntary and should have been suppressed.
3. The defense argued evidence used against Frazier was obtained during an illegal search of a gym bag used jointly by Frazier and Rawls.

== Decision ==
1. The Court stated the trial judge followed necessary protocol by instructing the jury to disregard the references to Rawls's statements. The Court agreed the prosecution did not emphasize Rawls's statements over other evidence and the statements alone were not "touted to the jury as a crucial part of the prosecution's case".
2. The Court ruled Frazier did not formally request an attorney, as required for Escobedo v. Illinois to apply, and Miranda v. Arizona did not apply because the original trial took place in 1965, one year before Miranda. The Court also ruled that the statement, on its own, did not render the confession involuntary based on a "totality of the circumstances" view.
3. The Court dismissed the illegal search argument, citing consent was legally obtained from Rawls and his mother. The Court ruled Rawls, a co-owner of the gym bag, was authorized to give consent to search the bag, even though items in certain compartments of the bag belonged to Frazier.

The Court stated:

The fact that the police misrepresented the statements that Rawls had made is, while relevant, insufficient, in our view, to make this otherwise voluntary confession inadmissible.

== Subsequent history ==
Later case law has interpreted Frazier v. Cupp as the case permitting police deception during interrogations. The language of the ruling did not specifically state which forms of police deception were acceptable, but the ruling provided a precedent for a confession being voluntary even though deceptive tactics were used.
