= San Antonio Independent School District v. Rodriguez =

- Supreme Court of the United States

Argued October 12, 1972 Decided March 21, 1973
- Full case name: San Antonio Independent School District, et al. v. Demetrio P. Rodriguez, et al.
- Citations: 411 U.S. 1 (more) 93 S. Ct. 1278; 36 L. Ed. 2d 16; 1973 U.S. LEXIS 91

Case history
- Prior: Judgment for plaintiffs, 337 F. Supp. 280 W.D. Tex. (1971); probable jurisdiction noted, 406 U.S. 966 (1972).
- Subsequent: Rehearing denied, 411 U.S. 959 (1973).

Holding
- Reliance on property taxes to fund public schools does not violate the Equal Protection Clause even if it causes inter-district expenditure disparities. Absolute equality of education funding is not required and a state system that encourages local control over schools bears a rational relationship to a legitimate state interest. U.S. District Court for the Western District of Texas reversed.

Court membership
- Chief Justice Warren E. Burger Associate Justices William O. Douglas · William J. Brennan Jr. Potter Stewart · Byron White; Thurgood Marshall · Harry Blackmun; Lewis F. Powell Jr. · William Rehnquist

Case opinions
- Majority: Powell, joined by Burger, Stewart, Blackmun, Rehnquist
- Concurrence: Stewart
- Dissent: Brennan
- Dissent: White, joined by Douglas, Brennan
- Dissent: Marshall, joined by Douglas

Laws applied
- U.S. Const. amend. XIV

San Antonio Independent School District v. Rodriguez, 411 U.S. 1 (1973), was a case in which the Supreme Court of the United States held that San Antonio Independent School District's financing system, which was based on local property taxes, was not a violation of the Fourteenth Amendment's Equal Protection Clause.

The majority opinion, reversing the District Court, stated that the appellees did not sufficiently prove a textual basis, within the U.S. Constitution, supporting the principle that education is a fundamental right. Urging that the school financing system led to wealth-based discrimination, the plaintiffs had argued that the fundamental right to education should be applied to the States, through the Fourteenth Amendment. The Court found that there was no such fundamental right and that the unequal school financing system was not subject to strict scrutiny.

== Background ==
The lawsuit was brought by members of the Edgewood Concerned Parent Association representing their children and similarly situated students. The suit was filed on June 30, 1968, in the District Court for the Western District of Texas. In the initial complaint, the parents sued San Antonio ISD, Alamo Heights ISD, and five other school districts; the Bexar County School Trustees; and the State of Texas. They contended that the "Texas method of school financing violated the equal protection clause of the Fourteenth Amendment to the U. S. Constitution." The lawsuit alleged that education was a fundamental right and that wealth-based discrimination in the provision of education (such as a fundamental right), created in the poor, or those of lesser wealth, a constitutionally suspect class, who were to be protected from the discrimination.

Eventually, the school districts were dropped from the case, leaving only the State of Texas as the defendant. The case advanced through the courts system, providing victory to the Edgewood parents until it reached the Supreme Court in 1972.

The school districts in the San Antonio area, and generally in Texas, had a long history of financial inequity. Rodriguez presented evidence that school districts in the wealthy, primarily white, areas of town, most notably the north-side Alamo Heights Independent School District, were able to contribute a much higher amount per child than Edgewood, a poor, minority area.

From the trial brief, Dr. Jose Cardenas, Superintendent of Schools, Edgewood Independent School District testified to the problem in his affidavit, the following information:

1. Edgewood is a poor district with a low tax base. As a result, its ad valorem tax revenue falls far short of the monies available in other Bexar County school districts. With this inequitable financing of its schools, Edgewood cannot hire sufficient qualified personnel, nor provide the physical facilities, library books, equipment, and supplies afforded by other Bexar County Districts.
2. To illustrate, the Edgewood residents are making a high tax effort, have burdened themselves with one of the highest proportion of bonded indebtedness in the county to pay for capital improvements and, never, in the history of the district have they failed to approve a bond issue.

Cardenas cites a study, "A Tale of Two Districts," which makes the following comparisons in 1967-68 between Edgewood and the North East Independent School District:

- Classroom space: North East had 70.36 square feet (6.537 m^{2}) per student; Edgewood had 50.4 square feet (4.68 m^{2}) per student
- Library books: North East had 9.42 books per student; Edgewood had 3.9 books per student
- Teacher/Pupil Ratio: North East's ratio was 1/19; Edgewood's was 1/28
- Counselor/Pupil Ratio: North East's was 1/1,553 children; Edgewood's was 1/5,672 (the nearby Alamo Heights district had a 1/1,319 ratio)
- Dropout rate, secondary students: North East's rate was 8%; Edgewood's was 32%

In fact, the financial disparity between Edgewood and Alamo Heights increased in the four years that it took for Rodriguez to work its way through the court system "from a $310 total per-pupil disparity in 1968 in state and local support between the districts to a $389 disparity in 1972."

== Decision ==
In the Supreme Court, a new group of justices had been appointed since the filing of the case. The most significant new member was Justice Lewis Powell, who proved to be the swing vote in the Rodriguez case. Powell led the narrow majority in deciding that the right to be educated (as a child of school age or an uneducated adult), was neither 'explicitly or implicitly' textually found anywhere in the U.S. Constitution. It was therefore, not anywhere protected by the Constitution.

He also found that Texas had not created a suspect class related to poverty. The two findings allowed the state to continue its school financing plan as long as it was "rationally related to a legitimate state interest."

== Dissent ==
Justices Brennan, Douglas, White, and Marshall dissented. In his dissent, Justice Marshall argued that in cases involving unenumerated rights, the Court's "task...should be to determine the extent to which constitutionally guaranteed rights are dependent on interests not mentioned in the Constitution," and "[a]s the nexus between the specific constitutional guarantee and the nonconstitutional interest draws closer, the nonconstitutional interest becomes more fundamental and the degree of judicial scrutiny applied when the interest is infringed on a discriminatory basis must be adjusted accordingly."

== Reaction and aftermath ==
In a 2015 TIME interview of over 50 legal scholars, University of California, Berkeley Law School Dean Erwin Chemerinsky and Cornell Law Professor Steven Shiffrin both named Rodriguez the "worst Supreme Court decision since 1960," with Chemerinsky noting that the decision has "played a major role in creating the separate and unequal schools that exist today."

Partially in response to the Court's ruling in Rodriguez, Justice William Brennan wrote an article in the Harvard Law Review urging lawyers and litigants to turn to their State Supreme Courts — rather than the U.S. Supreme Court — to litigate their constitutional claims, as the conservative Burger Court would likely be unreceptive to claims made by racial minorities, the poor, or other "politically powerless groups whose members have historically been subjected to purposeful discrimination." Since Brennan's article was published, a number of State Supreme Courts have held that substantially unequal public school funding violates their State Constitutions.

In April 2020 a three judge panel of the United States Sixth Circuit Court of Appeals voted 2–1 in Gary B. v. Whitmer to recognize that children have a US constitutional right to basic literacy education. The panel decision distinguished San Antonio Independent School District v. Rodriguez, which did not address the fundamental right to basic education. After an appeal for an en banc review, the case was settled and the panel's precedential decision vacated.

== See also ==
- Abbott District, a legal doctrine in New Jersey state constitutional law resulting from a series of cases holding that the education of children in certain poor, urban communities was unconstitutionally inadequate.
- Edgewood Independent School District v. Kirby, a 1993 Texas decision recognizing that unequal funding of public school districts violated the Texas State Constitution.
- Roosevelt Elementary School Dist. v. Bishop, a 1994 Arizona Supreme Court decision holding that substantially unequal school funding violates the Arizona Constitution.
- Serrano v. Priest, a post-Rodriguez decision in which California courts found that the method of funding schools violated the California Constitution's equal protection clause.
- Gannon v. State, a 2017 Kansas Supreme Court decision ruling that Kansas' school-funding framework violates the Kansas Constitution.
- List of United States Supreme Court cases, volume 411
