= Equality of sacrifice =

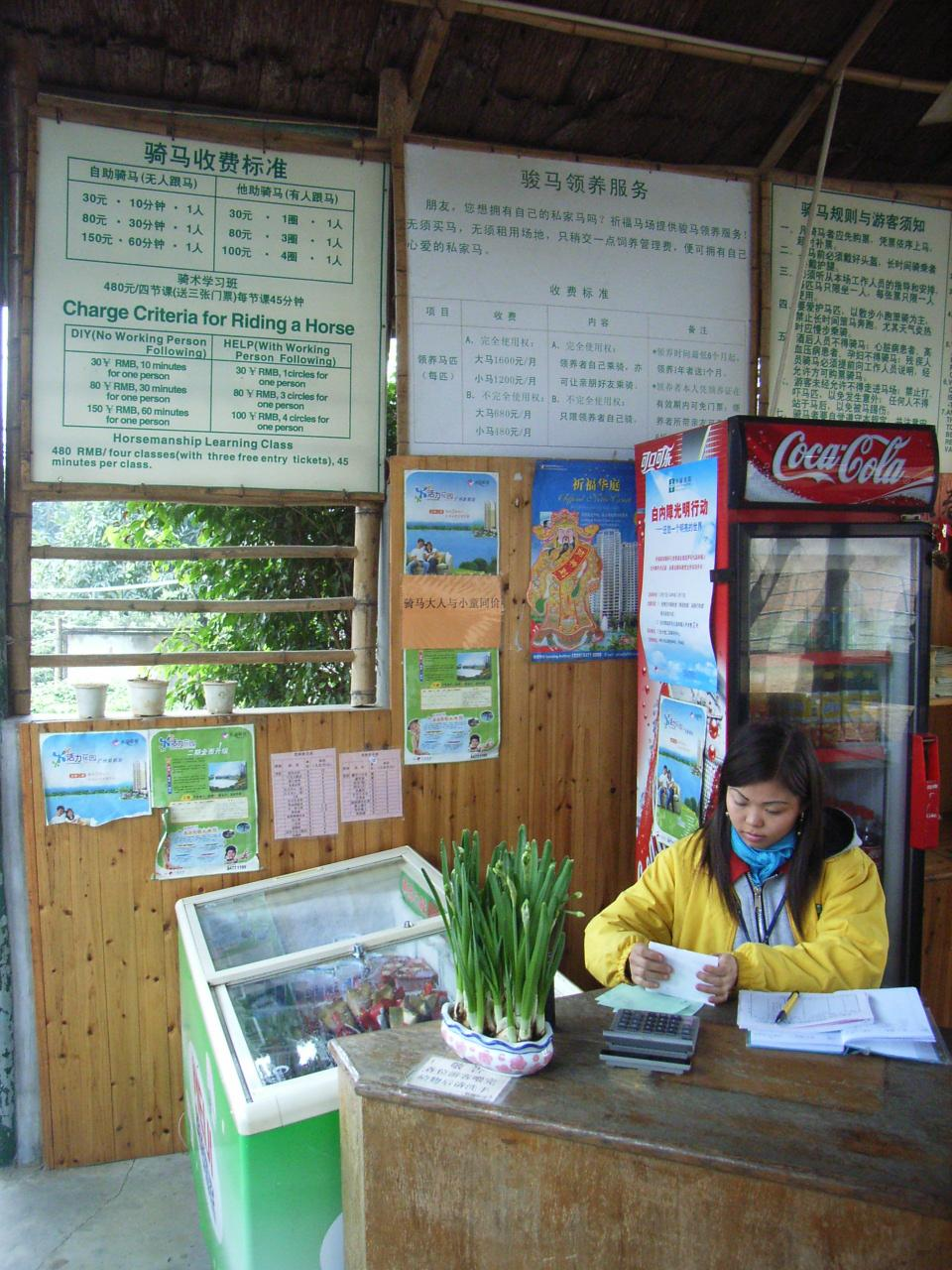
PanYu Clifford Farm Cashier

Equality of sacrifice is a term used in political theory and political philosophy to refer to the perceived fairness of a coercive policy.

John Stuart Mill noticed that citizens often view taxation laws as being fair, as long as taxation is also applied equally to everyone else in society. Political theorist Margaret Levi applied the term to the perceived fairness of conscription in democracies, to which citizens may consent as long as conscription is enforced as a universal duty – as opposed to elitist and exceptionalist policies, as it will sometimes occur in partial mobilization.

The term was also adopted by Lee Iacocca who, as the president of Chrysler, lowered his salary to less than a dollar a year before asking union members for radical wage cuts in order to deal with the company's financial difficulties. During the 2008 financial crisis, Iacocca's example has often been mentioned in opposition to "unconditional" government bail-out of failing companies. In a letter to the leaders of the big three U.S. automakers, Senator Chuck Grassley said that before receiving a government bailout executives should follow the example of former Chrysler head Lee Iacocca and cut their own pay:

Lee Iacocca essentially worked for pennies to demonstrate leadership and forcefully prove to his colleagues that he was ready to make sacrifices to reinvigorate Chrysler [...] Today’s executives could learn a lot from this example. They should take every step possible, including cutting executive salaries and bonuses, and exhaust all alternatives before coming to the taxpayers for tens of billions of dollars in help.
