= List of United States Supreme Court cases, volume 394 =

This is a list of all the United States Supreme Court cases from volume 394 of the United States Reports:

Case name	Citation	Date decided
United States v. Louisiana (1969)	394 U.S. 1	1969
United States v. Louisiana (1969) (second case)	394 U.S. 11	1969
Utah v. United States	394 U.S. 89	1969
Bokulich v. Jury Commission	394 U.S. 97	1969
Black Unity League v. Miller	394 U.S. 100	1969
Holden v. Arnebergh	394 U.S. 102	1969
Golden v. Zwickler	394 U.S. 103	1969
Gregory v. City of Chicago	394 U.S. 111	1969
Citizen Public Co. v. United States	394 U.S. 131	1969
Shuttlesworth v. Birmingham	394 U.S. 147	1969
Alderman v. United States	394 U.S. 165	1969
Dunbar-Stanley Studios, Inc. v. Mobile	394 U.S. 212	1969
Powers v. Circuit Court	394 U.S. 212	1969
Teamsters v. NLRB	394 U.S. 213	1969
Abrams v. Wiethe	394 U.S. 213	1969
Shaw v. Illinois	394 U.S. 214	1969
Watts v. Maryland	394 U.S. 214	1969
Jones v. California	394 U.S. 215	1969
Sumrall v. Kidd	394 U.S. 215	1969
Johnson v. Voyles	394 U.S. 216	1969
Kaufman v. United States	394 U.S. 217	1969
Desist v. United States	394 U.S. 244	1969
Kaiser v. New York	394 U.S. 280	1969
Harris v. Nelson	394 U.S. 286	1969
DuVernay v. United States	394 U.S. 309	1969
Giordano v. United States	394 U.S. 310	1969
Taglianetti v. United States	394 U.S. 316	1969
Shakespeare v. Zervos	394 U.S. 319	1969
Mayhue's Super Liquor Stores, Inc. v. Meiklejohn	394 U.S. 319	1969
Woods v. California	394 U.S. 320	1969
Boeing Co. v. Hamm	394 U.S. 320	1969
In re Gross	394 U.S. 321	1969
Federal-Bryant Machine Co. v. Department of Revenue	394 U.S. 321	1969
McInnis v. Ogilvie	394 U.S. 322	1969
Campbell v. Washington State Bar Association	394 U.S. 323	1969
Orozco v. Texas	394 U.S. 324	1969
Snyder v. Harris	394 U.S. 332	1969
Hadnott v. Amos	394 U.S. 358	1969
Trainmen v. Jacksonville Terminal Co.	394 U.S. 369	1969
In re Herndon	394 U.S. 399	1969
Federal Marine Terminals, Inc. v. Burnside Shipping Co.	394 U.S. 404	1969
Scofield v. NLRB	394 U.S. 423	1969
Cardinale v. Louisiana	394 U.S. 437	1969
Foster v. California	394 U.S. 440	1969
Mrkonjic-Ruzic v. United States	394 U.S. 454	1969
Nickolich v. Ohio	394 U.S. 454	1969
Hotel Employees v. Emery	394 U.S. 455	1969
DeLury v. City of New York	394 U.S. 455	1969
Mitchell v. Riddell	394 U.S. 456	1969
MacQuarrie v. McLaughlin	394 U.S. 456	1969
Fannon v. United States	394 U.S. 457	1969
Rose v. Ohio	394 U.S. 457	1969
Kaufer v. United States	394 U.S. 458	1969
McCarthy v. United States	394 U.S. 459	1969
Boulden v. Holman	394 U.S. 478	1969
Gregg v. United States	394 U.S. 489	1969
Fortner Enterprises, Inc. v. United States Steel Corp.	394 U.S. 495	1969
Kirkpatrick v. Preisler	394 U.S. 526	1969
Wells v. Rockefeller	394 U.S. 542	1969
Stanley v. Georgia	394 U.S. 557	1969
Stephan v. State Tax Commissioner	394 U.S. 573	1969
Soszka v. Manganaro	394 U.S. 573	1969
Anderson v. South Carolina	394 U.S. 574	1969
Davis v. United States (1969)	394 U.S. 574	1969
Rollerson v. United States	394 U.S. 575	1969
Street v. New York	394 U.S. 576	1969
Shapiro v. Thompson	394 U.S. 618	1969
United States v. Skelly Oil Co.	394 U.S. 678	1969
Norfolk Monument Co. v. Woodlawn Memorial Gardens, Inc.	394 U.S. 700	1969
Watts v. United States	394 U.S. 705	1969
Emanuel v. Chapple	394 U.S. 713	1969
Continental Casualty Co. v. Robertson Lumber Co.	394 U.S. 714	1969
Pendergraft v. Mississippi	394 U.S. 715	1969
Ottley v. Long Island College Hospital	394 U.S. 716	1969
City of Chicago v. United States	394 U.S. 717	1969
Estes Express Lines v. United States	394 U.S. 718	1969
Consolidated Copperstate Lines v. United States	394 U.S. 719	1969
Jones v. Florida	394 U.S. 720	1969
Davis v. Mississippi	394 U.S. 721	1969
Frazier v. Cupp	394 U.S. 731	1969
Bingler v. Johnson	394 U.S. 741	1969
NLRB v. Wyman-Gordon Co.	394 U.S. 759	1969
United States v. Article of Drug	394 U.S. 784	1969
McDonald v. Board of Election Commissioners	394 U.S. 802	1969
Burton v. Sills	394 U.S. 812	1969
Sullivan v. Alabama State Bar	394 U.S. 812	1969
Lombardy v. Peter Kiewit Sons' Co.	394 U.S. 813	1969
Moore v. Ogilvie	394 U.S. 814	1969
Kramer v. Caribbean Mills, Inc.	394 U.S. 823	1969
Halliday v. United States	394 U.S. 831	1969
United States v. Louisiana (1969) (third case)	394 U.S. 836	1969
Southern Pacific Co. v. Public Utility Commission	394 U.S. 845	1969
Waggoner v. Rosenn	394 U.S. 846	1969
Rhodes v. Kansas	394 U.S. 846	1969
Robinson v. Johnson	394 U.S. 847	1969
Montgomery v. Burns	394 U.S. 848	1969
National Trailer Convoy, Inc. v. United States	394 U.S. 849	1969
