= Goldberg v. Kelly =

- Supreme Court of the United States

Argued October 13, 1969 Decided March 23, 1970
- Full case name: Goldberg, Commissioner of Social Services of the City of New York v. Kelly, et al.
- Citations: 397 U.S. 254 (more) 90 S. Ct. 1011; 25 L. Ed. 2d 287; 1970 U.S. LEXIS 80

Case history
- Prior: Appeal from the United States District Court for the Southern District of New York, Kelly v. Wyman, 294 F. Supp. 893 (S.D.N.Y. 1969); probable jurisdiction noted, 394 U.S. 971 (1969).

Holding
- The Due Process Clause of the Fourteenth Amendment to the United States Constitution requires a full evidentiary hearing before a recipient of certain government benefits is deprived of such benefits.

Court membership
- Chief Justice Warren E. Burger Associate Justices Hugo Black · William O. Douglas; John M. Harlan II · William J. Brennan Jr. Potter Stewart · Byron White; Thurgood Marshall

Case opinions
- Majority: Brennan, joined by Douglas, Harlan, White, Marshall
- Dissent: Burger
- Dissent: Black
- Dissent: Stewart

Laws applied
- U.S. Const. amend. XIV

Goldberg v. Kelly, 397 U.S. 254 (1970), is a case in which the Supreme Court of the United States ruled that the Due Process Clause of the Fourteenth Amendment to the United States Constitution requires an evidentiary hearing before a recipient of certain government welfare benefits can be deprived of such benefits.

The individual losing benefits is entitled to an oral hearing before an impartial decision-maker as well as the right to confront and cross-examine witnesses and the right to a written statement setting out the evidence relied upon and the legal basis for the decision. There is no right to a formal trial. The case was decided 5–3. (There was a vacancy on the Court because of the resignation of Abe Fortas.) Goldberg v. Kelly, Shapiro v. Thompson, and King v. Smith were a part of the set of successful Supreme Court cases that dealt with Welfare, specifically referred to as a part of 'The Welfare Cases'.

== Issues ==
Federal welfare was administered by the new Department of Health Education and Welfare.

1. Does the Fourteenth Amendment of the United States Constitution demand a hearing before the termination of statutorily defined welfare benefits?
2. Does a pre-termination "informal hearing" in a welfare case satisfy the requirements of the Fourteenth Amendment?
3. Does the Fourteenth Amendment require a full "evidentiary hearing" prior to termination of welfare benefits?
4. Does the welfare recipient have the right to counsel or an attorney at an evidentiary hearing?
5. To what extent does the welfare administrative decision maker need to be impartial?

== Holdings ==
1. Welfare benefits are a matter of statutory entitlement for persons qualified to receive them and so procedural due process is applicable to their termination.
2. The interest of the eligible recipient in the uninterrupted receipt of public assistance, which provides him with essential food, clothing, housing, and medical care and the State's interest that his payments not be erroneously terminated clearly outweigh the State's competing concern to prevent any increase in its fiscal and administrative burdens.
3. A pre-termination evidentiary hearing is necessary to provide the welfare recipient with procedural due process.
  1. Such hearing need not take the form of a judicial or quasi-judicial trial, but the recipient must be provided with timely and adequate notice detailing the reasons for termination and an effective opportunity to defend by confronting adverse witnesses and by presenting his own arguments and evidence orally before the decision maker.
  2. Counsel need not be furnished at the pre-termination hearing, but the recipient must be allowed to retain an attorney.
  3. A decision must rest "solely on the legal rules and evidence adduced at the hearing."
  4. The decision maker need not file a full opinion or make formal findings of fact or conclusions of law but should state the reasons for his determination and indicate the evidence he relied on.
  5. The decision maker must be impartial, and although prior involvement in some aspects of a case will not necessarily bar a welfare official from acting as decision maker, he should not have participated in making the determination under review.

== Discussion ==
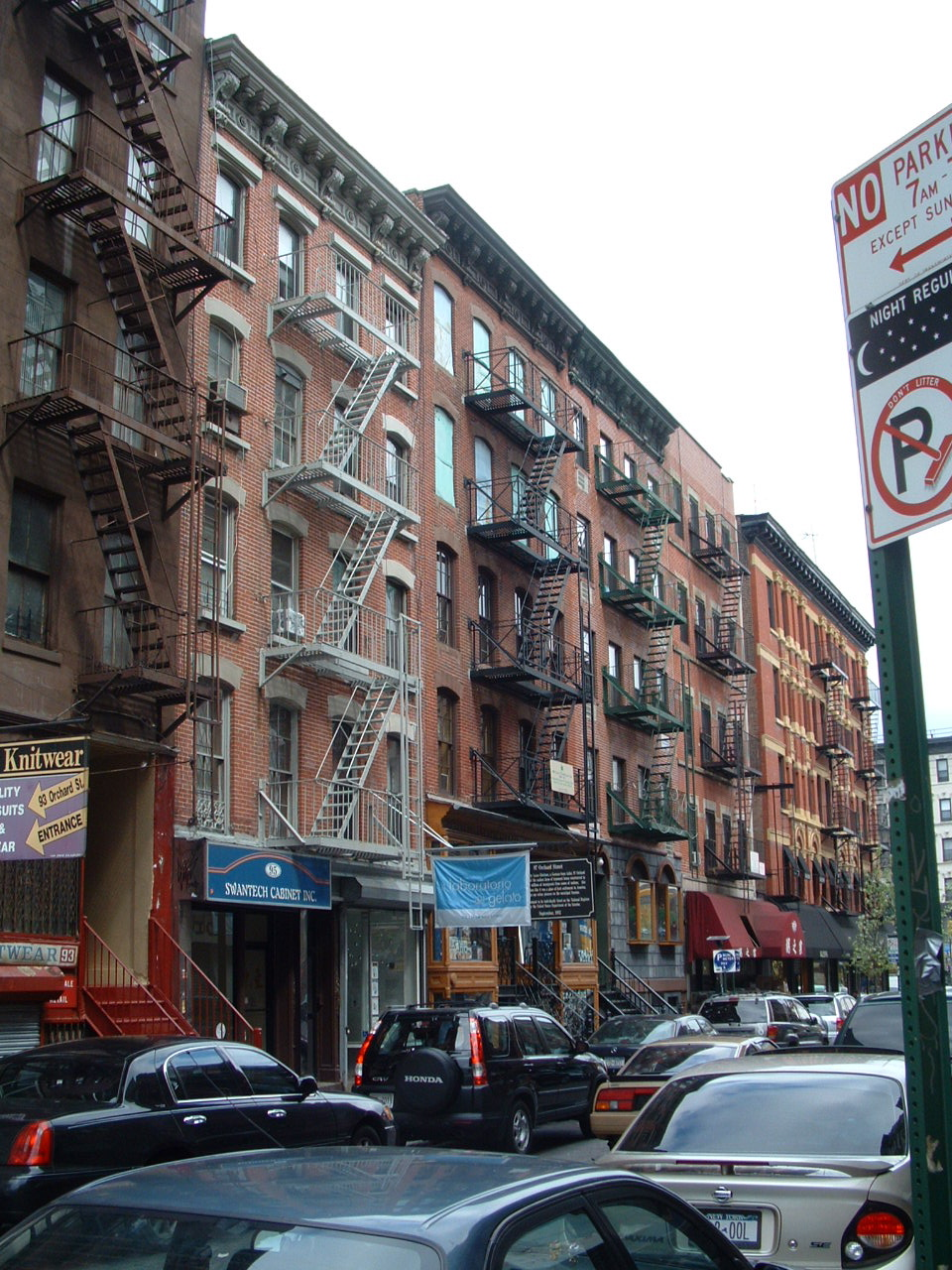
Federal involvement in welfare was designed to end the poverty of big city tenements, among other places.

The Goldberg decision set the parameters for procedural due process when dealing with the deprivation of a government benefit or entitlement. The Court held that a person has a property interest in certain government entitlements, which require notice and a hearing before a governmental entity (either state or federal) takes them away. Government-provided entitlements from the modern welfare state increased substantially in the United States during the 20th century. The Goldberg court decided that such entitlements (like welfare payments, government pensions, professional licenses), are a form of "new property" that require pre-deprivation procedural protection and so did away with the traditional distinction between rights and privileges.

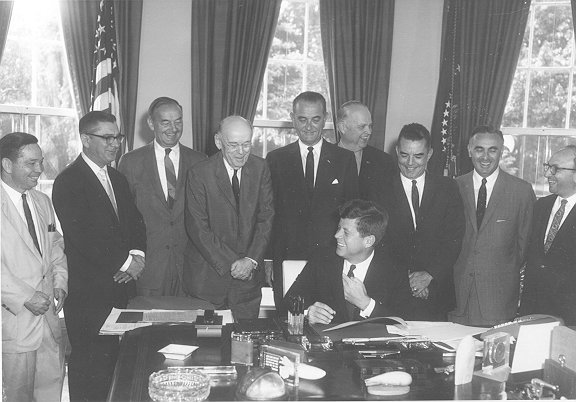
Growth of federal involvement in funding and administrating welfare began under President John F. Kennedy.

The majority stated that welfare benefits are property and articulated the general proposition that welfare enjoys the same legal protection as other property. Justice Brennan noted that welfare benefits are "a matter of statutory entitlement for persons qualified to receive them" and added that "it may be realistic today to regard welfare entitlements as more like 'property' than a 'gratuity'". Here Brennan cited Charles A. Reich's article "The New Property". The prohibition against deprivation of property without due process of law in the Fourteenth Amendment therefore applies to benefits termination.

This specific case dealt with 20 individuals who had been suspected of welfare fraud by New York City officials and were then denied municipal benefits. The opinion of the Court was delivered by Justice William Brennan, while dissenting opinions were filed by Justices Hugo Black and Potter Stewart and Chief Justice Warren Burger. Brennan said at his retirement that he considered it the most important case he had ever decided; conservative columnist David Frum once claimed that the case was a major factor in New York City's 1975 fiscal crisis.

Twenty residents of New York City, including John Kelly, appealed the termination of their benefits under the Aid to Families with Dependent Children program. Their assistance had been terminated or was about to be terminated without a pre-termination hearing. The procedures provided by the State Department of Social Services' Official Regulations did include a pre-termination review and a post-termination hearing.

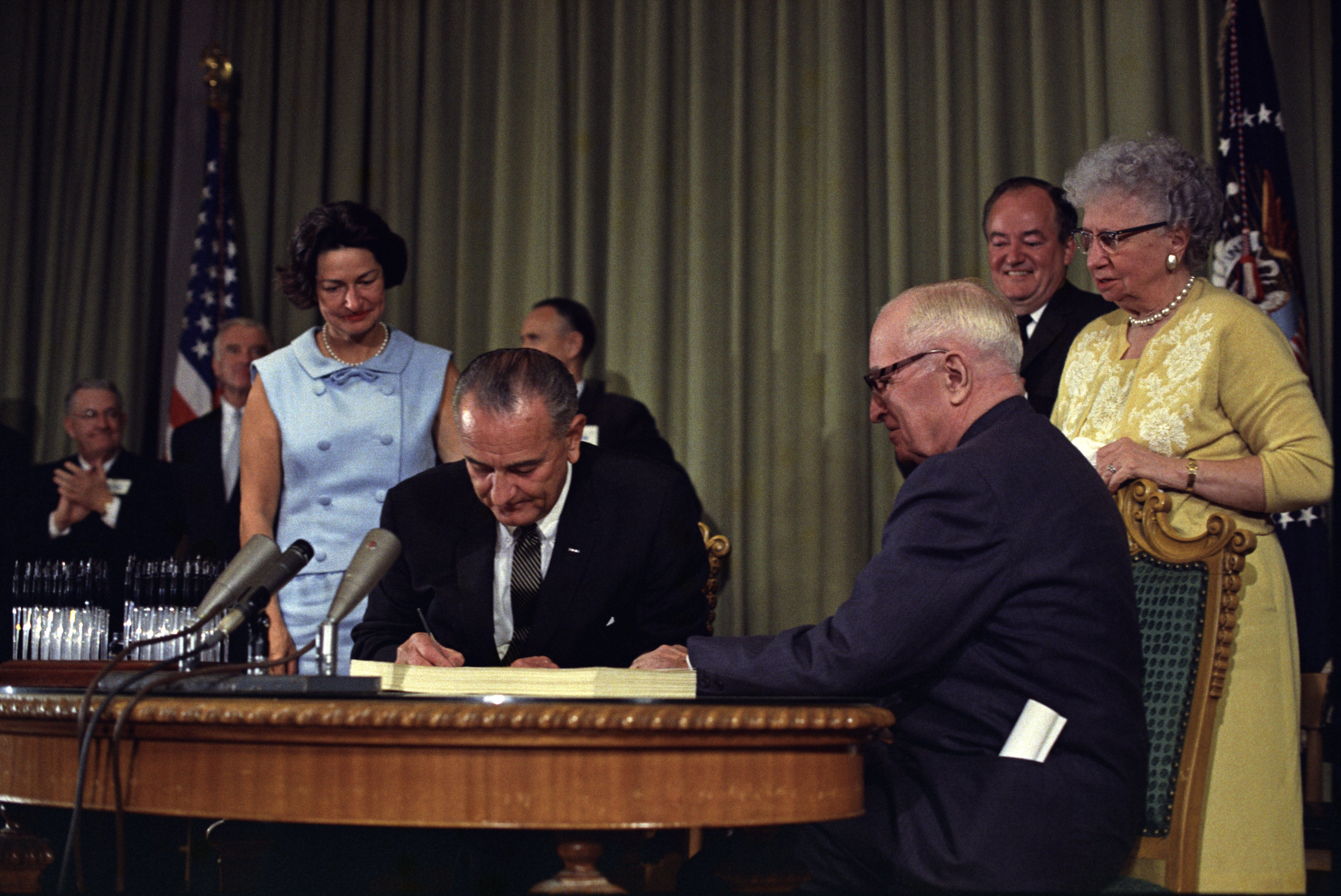
Welfare expanded under the Great Society programs of Lyndon B. Johnson in the 1960s.

The decision answered questions that had been unresolved in the previous Supreme Court cases of Rudder v. United States and Thorpe v. Housing Authority of Durham. The cases involved questions of denial of tenancy or eviction in governmental housing projects.

It has been noted that the precarious financial status of those in poverty may preclude an extensive litigation process despite the decision. The abstention doctrine presupposes the adequacy of state process to protect constitutional rights. Poor people may lack the funds to pursue a court hearing process. One solution has been the use of a preliminary injunction, which preserves the status quo while the litigation proceeds.

== See also ==
- Administrative Procedure Act (United States)
- Due process
- Redistributive change
- Perry v. Sindermann, 408 U.S. 593 (1972)
- Mathews v. Eldridge, 424 U.S. 319 (1976)
