= King v. Smith =

- Supreme Court of the United States

Argued April 23, 1968 Decided June 17, 1968
- Full case name: King, Commissioner, Department of Pensions and Security, et al. v. Smith et al.
- Citations: 392 U.S. 309 (more) 88 S. Ct. 2128; 20 L. Ed. 2d 1118; 1968 U.S. LEXIS 1139

Holding
- Aid to Families with Dependent Children cannot be denied to families of qualifying children based on a substitute father.

Court membership
- Chief Justice Earl Warren Associate Justices Hugo Black · William O. Douglas; John M. Harlan II · William J. Brennan Jr. Potter Stewart · Byron White; Abe Fortas · Thurgood Marshall

Case opinions
- Majority: Warren, joined by Black, Harlan, Brennan, Stewart, White, Fortas, Marshall
- Concurrence: Douglas

King v. Smith, 392 U.S. 309 (1968), was a unanimous decision in which the Supreme Court of the United States held that Aid to Families with Dependent Children (AFDC) could not be withheld because of the presence of a "substitute father" who visited a family on weekends. The issue before the US Supreme Court involved how the states could determine how to implement a federal program. The court used the term "co-operative federalism." Shapiro v. Thompson, King v. Smith and Goldberg v. Kelly were a set of successful Supreme Court cases that dealt with Welfare, specifically referred to as a part of 'The Welfare Cases'.

== Background ==
Mrs. Sylvester Smith was a Dallas County, Alabama resident who had four children, without a biological father providing support. The father of three of her children had died and the father of her fourth child was not in the picture. Thus, she qualified for AFDC. She was, however, having an affair with a Mr. Williams. Mr. Williams had nine children of his own. Williams, who visited on weekends, was counted as a "substitute father", thus disqualifying the family for aid according to Alabama Law.

== Decision ==
In a unanimous decision, the Court held that the term "father" did not include substitute fathers because Williams was under no obligation to support Smith's children. Martin Garbus spoke for the appellees of the case.
