= Bolotin =

Bolotin (Russian: Болотин, from болотo meaning swamp) is a Russian masculine surname, its feminine counterpart is Bolotina.

It is generally a toponym - from the Bolotnya Болотня township in the Mogilev province of eastern Belarus.

Notable people with the name include:

- Craig Bolotin (born 1954), American screenwriter and film director
- David Bolotin (born 1944), American classical scholar
- Elena Bolotina (born 1997), Belarusian rhythmic gymnast
- Jacob Bolotin (1888–1924), American physician
- Maxim Bolotin (born 1982), Russian ice dancer
- Michael Bolton (born Michael Bolotin in 1953), American singer and songwriter
- Ron Bolotin, Israeli paralympic swimmer
- Sergey Vladimirovich Bolotin (born 1954), Russian mathematician
- Vladimir V. Bolotin (1926–2008), Russian physicist
