= Funeral oration =

Funeral oration or Funeral Oration may refer to:

- eulogy
- funeral sermon, funeral address structured around exposition of a text from the Bible
- Funeral oration (ancient Greece)
- Oration at Korean traditional funeral
- Pericles' Funeral Oration, delivered at the end of the first year of the First Peloponnesian War to honor the Athenian war dead and their society
- A Funeral Oration (Lysias) by Lysias, one of the "Canon of Ten" Attic orators (Speech 2 in Lamb's translation)
- Funeral Oration (band), a punk rock band from Amsterdam, the Netherlands
