= Funeral oration (ancient Greece) =

Ancient Greek formal speech

A funeral oration or epitaphios logos (Ancient Greek: ἐπιτάφιος λόγος) is a formal speech delivered on the ceremonial occasion of a funeral. Funerary customs comprise the practices used by a culture to remember the dead, from the funeral itself, to various monuments, prayers, and rituals undertaken in their honour. In ancient Greece and, in particular, in ancient Athens, the funeral oration was deemed an indispensable component of the funeral ritual.

The epitaphios logos is regarded as an almost exclusive Athenian creation, although some early elements of such speeches exist in the epos of Homer and in the lyric poems of Pindar. "Pericles' Funeral Oration", delivered for the war dead during the Peloponnesian War of 431-401 BC, is the earliest extant example of the genre.

== History ==
The orator Anaximenes of Lampsacus claimed that the funeral oration was first established in the 6th-century BC in Athens by Solon, but this is widely doubted by historians. More plausible, but not beyond doubt, is the statement by Dionysius of Halicarnassus that the Athenians instituted the funeral oration "in honour or those who fought at Artemisium, Salamis, and Plataea, and died for their country, or to the glory of their exploits at Marathon."

Thucydides describes in detail the funeral rituals and points out that "the dead are laid in the public sepulchre in the most beautiful suburb of the city, in which those who fall in war are always buried". This suburb was Kerameikos, where there was a monument for all the Athenians fell in battle, except such of them as fought at Marathon.

Historians now believe that the demosion sema (a collective burial site for the war dead) and the epitaphios logos were first established around 470 BC, customs that continued during the Periclean period. The earliest preserved casualty list, giving the names of those who died fighting for their city in a given year, dates to 490–480 BC and it is associated with the battle of Marathon, and white-ground lekythoi depicting funerary scenes started around 470 BC. "Pericles' Funeral Oration", as reported by Thucydides, is the earliest epitaphios presented in full. The burial of the war dead in the first year of the Peloponnesian War is regarded as reflecting the fifth-century dominance of the public co-memorial.

== Scheme and structure ==
Though Plato is consistently suspicious of the ability of oratory to teach, in the Menexenus he demonstrates a theoretical interest in the project of funeral oratory. He actually describes the scheme of the traditional Athenian funeral oration with the following succinct phrase:

And the speech required is one which will adequately eulogize the dead and give kindly exhortation to the living, appealing to their children and their brethren to copy the virtues of these heroes, and to their fathers and mothers and any still surviving ancestors offering consolation.

Thereby, the traditional epitaphios must contain: a eulogy of the war dead and the city, an exhortation to the relatives to copy the virtues of the war dead and a consolation for the living members of their families.

Therefore, the epitaphios consists of the following parts:

- Preamble, which treats the performance expectations of the audience. The orator usually asserts that it is almost impossible for him to find words worthy of the glorious achievements of the war dead. Such a preamble reveals the position of the epitaphios as an oral genre within a ritually and socially bounded society.
- Origin and ancestors.
- The war dead, their self-sacrifice and their devotion to the Athenian Polity.
- Epilogue, which constitutes a consolation and an encouragement for the families of the war dead. The epilogue employs a traditional dismissal of the mourners for further private lament, at which point the city's promise of education for the surviving orphans signals the resumption of life in the polis.

== Function and critics ==
The primary function of the funeral oration was to give public expression to the conception of the potential excellence of polis. It was an occasion on which Athens "invented" and "reinvented" itself in narrative form. The city displayed its achievements, as well as the civic and personal virtues to which the citizens could aspire. The secular prose of the funeral oration dedicates itself to celebrating the ideal of the democratic Athenian city. Through the epitaphios, a civic discourse, the city recognizes itself as it wishes to be.

It is for this reason that Plato has chosen the funeral oration as a main target of him. In Menexenus he engages the concerns of funeral oratory and appropriates for philosophy part of the intellectual mission that the Athenians associated with the most celebrated and democratic form of epideictic, the funeral oratory.

== Extant speeches ==
The following speeches are preserved in ancient sources:

- Pericles' Funeral Oration of 439 BC, lost;
- Pericles' Funeral Oration of 431 BC, as presented by Thucydides in his History of the Peloponnesian War;
- Gorgias' Funeral Oration, perhaps late fifth century BC, mostly lost;
- Lysias' Funeral oration, ca. 391 BC;
- Plato's Menexenus, a parody written in the mid-fourth century, in which Socrates recites a funeral oration that he claims Aspasia wrote for Pericles;
- Demosthenes' Funeral Oration of 338 BC;
- Hypereides' Funeral Oration of 322 BC.

Several specimens of this genre were not composed for delivery at the public burial, but for reading to small audiences at intellectual gatherings. Gorgias' funeral oration and Plato's parodic speech in Menexenus were definitely designed for this context, not for delivery before the Athenian people. It is debated whether this was also the case for Lysias' oration. The relationship between Thucydides' presentation of Pericles' oration of 431 BC and what was actually said is highly disputed; it is "usually understood as being more Thucydides' work than Pericles."

== See also ==
- Ancient Greek funeral and burial practices
- Eulogy – modern discussion of funeral orations

== Bibliography ==
Primary sources

- Demosthenes, Against Leptines. See original text in Perseus Project
- Homer, Iliad, Book 22–23. See original text in Perseus Project
- Pausanias, Description of Greece. See original text in Perseus Project
- Plato, Menexenus.See original text in Perseus Project
- Thucydides, History of the Peloponnesian War, II. See original text in Perseus Project

Secondary sources

- Colaiaco, James A. (2001). Socrates Against Athens: Philosophy on Trial. Routledge (UK). ISBN 0-415-92654-8.
- "Funeral Oration". Encyclopaedia The Helios. 1952.
- Foley, Helene P. (2002). Female Acts in Greek Tragedy. Princeton University Press. ISBN 0-691-09492-6.
- Derderian, Katharine (2000). "The Epitaphios Logos and Mourning in the Athenian Polis". Leaving Words to Remember. Brill Academic Publishers. ISBN 90-04-11750-4.
- Loraux, Nicole (1994). The Children of Athena. Princeton University Press. ISBN 0-691-03762-0.
- Loraux, Nicole (1986). The Invention of Athens: The Funeral Oration in the Classical City. Harvard University Press.
- Monoson, Sara (2000). Plato's Democratic Entanglements. Princeton University Press. ISBN 0-691-04366-3.
- Samons, Loren J. (2005). "Bail Oinochoai". In Judith M. Barringer; Jeffrey M. Hurwit (eds.). Periklean Athens And Its Legacy. University of Texas Press. ISBN 0-292-70622-7.
- Shear, Julia L. (December 2013). "'Their Memories Will Never Grow Old': The Politics of Remembrance in the Athenian Funeral Orations". The Classical Quarterly. 63 (2): 511–536. doi:10.1017/S0009838813000062. ISSN 0009-8388. S2CID 154783833.
- Wienand, Johannes (2023). Der politische Tod: Gefallenenbestattung und 'Epitaphios Logos' im demokratischen Athen. Steiner. doi:10.25162/9783515133906.
- Wienand, Johannes (2024). "Gorgias' Funeral Oration". In David M. Pritchard (ed.). The Athenian Funeral Oration: After Nicole Loraux. Cambridge: Cambridge University Press. pp. 181–197. doi:10.1017/9781009413053.010. ISBN 978-1-009-41308-4.
