= List of United States Supreme Court cases, volume 176 =

Supreme Court of the United States
- Interactive map of Supreme Court of the United States
- 38°53′26″N 77°00′16″W
- Established: March 4, 1789; 236 years ago
- Location: Washington, D.C.
- Coordinates: 38°53′26″N 77°00′16″W
- Composition method: Presidential nomination with Senate confirmation
- Authorised by: Constitution of the United States, Art. III, § 1
- Judge term length: life tenure, subject to impeachment and removal
- Number of positions: 9 (by statute)
- Website: supremecourt.gov

This is a list of cases reported in volume 176 of United States Reports, decided by the Supreme Court of the United States in 1899 and 1900.

== Justices of the Supreme Court at the time of volume 176 U.S. ==
The Supreme Court is established by Article III, Section 1 of the Constitution of the United States, which says: "The judicial Power of the United States, shall be vested in one supreme Court . . .". The size of the Court is not specified; the Constitution leaves it to Congress to set the number of justices. Under the Judiciary Act of 1789 Congress originally fixed the number of justices at six (one chief justice and five associate justices). Since 1789 Congress has varied the size of the Court from six to seven, nine, ten, and back to nine justices (always including one chief justice).

When the cases in volume 176 were decided the Court comprised the following nine members:

Portrait	Justice	Office	Home State	Succeeded	Date confirmed by the Senate (Vote)	Tenure on Supreme Court
	Melville Fuller	Chief Justice	Illinois	Morrison Waite	July 20, 1888 (41–20)	October 8, 1888 – July 4, 1910 (Died)
	John Marshall Harlan	Associate Justice	Kentucky	David Davis	November 29, 1877 (Acclamation)	December 10, 1877 – October 14, 1911 (Died)
	Horace Gray	Associate Justice	Massachusetts	Nathan Clifford	December 20, 1881 (51–5)	January 9, 1882 – September 15, 1902 (Died)
	David Josiah Brewer	Associate Justice	Kansas	Stanley Matthews	December 18, 1889 (53–11)	January 6, 1890 – March 28, 1910 (Died)
	Henry Billings Brown	Associate Justice	Michigan	Samuel Freeman Miller	December 29, 1890 (Acclamation)	January 5, 1891 – May 28, 1906 (Retired)
	George Shiras Jr.	Associate Justice	Pennsylvania	Joseph P. Bradley	July 26, 1892 (Acclamation)	October 10, 1892 – February 23, 1903 (Retired)
	Edward Douglass White	Associate Justice	Louisiana	Samuel Blatchford	February 19, 1894 (Acclamation)	March 12, 1894 – December 18, 1910 (Continued as chief justice)
	Rufus W. Peckham	Associate Justice	New York	Howell Edmunds Jackson	December 9, 1895 (Acclamation)	January 6, 1896 – October 24, 1909 (Died)
	Joseph McKenna	Associate Justice	California	Stephen Johnson Field	January 21, 1898 (Acclamation)	January 26, 1898 – January 5, 1925 (Retired)

== Citation style ==
Under the Judiciary Act of 1789 the federal court structure at the time comprised District Courts, which had general trial jurisdiction; Circuit Courts, which had mixed trial and appellate (from the US District Courts) jurisdiction; and the United States Supreme Court, which had appellate jurisdiction over the federal District and Circuit courts—and for certain issues over state courts. The Supreme Court also had limited original jurisdiction (i.e., in which cases could be filed directly with the Supreme Court without first having been heard by a lower federal or state court). There were one or more federal District Courts and/or Circuit Courts in each state, territory, or other geographical region.

The Judiciary Act of 1891 created the United States Courts of Appeals and reassigned the jurisdiction of most routine appeals from the district and circuit courts to these appellate courts. The Act created nine new courts that were originally known as the "United States Circuit Courts of Appeals." The new courts had jurisdiction over most appeals of lower court decisions. The Supreme Court could review either legal issues that a court of appeals certified or decisions of court of appeals by writ of certiorari.

Bluebook citation style is used for case names, citations, and jurisdictions.

- "# Cir." = United States Court of Appeals
  - e.g., "3d Cir." = United States Court of Appeals for the Third Circuit
- "C.C.D." = United States Circuit Court for the District of . . .
  - e.g.,"C.C.D.N.J." = United States Circuit Court for the District of New Jersey
- "D." = United States District Court for the District of . . .
  - e.g.,"D. Mass." = United States District Court for the District of Massachusetts
- "E." = Eastern; "M." = Middle; "N." = Northern; "S." = Southern; "W." = Western
  - e.g.,"C.C.S.D.N.Y." = United States Circuit Court for the Southern District of New York
  - e.g.,"M.D. Ala." = United States District Court for the Middle District of Alabama
- "Ct. Cl." = United States Court of Claims
- The abbreviation of a state's name alone indicates the highest appellate court in that state's judiciary at the time.
  - e.g.,"Pa." = Supreme Court of Pennsylvania
  - e.g.,"Me." = Supreme Judicial Court of Maine

== List of cases in volume 176 U.S. ==
Case Name	Page and year	Opinion of the Court	Concurring opinion(s)	Dissenting opinion(s)	Lower Court	Disposition
Louisiana v. Texas	1 (1900)	Fuller	Harlan; Brown	none	original	dismissed
United States v. Oregon and California Railroad Company	28 (1900)	Harlan	none	none	9th Cir.	affirmed
Wilcox v. Eastern Oregon Land Company	51 (1900)	Harlan	none	none	9th Cir.	affirmed
Messinger v. Eastern Oregon Land Company	58 (1900)	Harlan	none	none	9th Cir.	affirmed
Blake v. McClung	59 (1900)	Harlan	none	none	Tenn.	reversed
Holt v. Indiana Manufacturing Company	68 (1900)	Fuller	none	none	C.C.D. Ind.	reversed
Cruickshank v. Bidwell	73 (1900)	Fuller	none	none	C.C.S.D.N.Y.	affirmed
Bolln v. Nebraska	83 (1900)	Brown	none	none	Neb.	affirmed
City of New Orleans v. Warner	92 (1900)	Brown	none	none	5th Cir.	affirmed
The Newfoundland	97 (1900)	McKenna	none	none	D.S.C.	reversed
Clark v. City of Kansas City	114 (1900)	McKenna	none	none	Kan.	affirmed
Rae v. Homestead Loan Guaranty Company	121 (1900)	Fuller	none	none	Ill.	dismissed
Lindsay and Phelps Company v. Mullen	126 (1900)	Brewer	none	Peckham	C.C.D. Minn.	affirmed
Chew Hing Lung Company v. Wise	156 (1900)	Peckham	none	none	9th Cir.	reversed
Chicago, Milwaukee and St. Paul Railway Company v. Tompkins	167 (1900)	Brewer	none	none	C.C.D.S.D.	reversed
Dickerman v. Northern Trust Company	181 (1900)	Brown	none	none	7th Cir.	affirmed
Glass v. Concordia Parish	207 (1900)	Fuller	none	none	C.C.E.D. La.	affirmed
United States v. Bellingham Bay Boom Company	211 (1900)	Peckham	none	none	9th Cir.	reversed
Toledo, St. Louis and Kansas City Railroad Company v. Continental Trust Company	219 (1900)	Fuller	none	none	6th Cir.	certiorari denied
Roberts v. United States	221 (1900)	Peckham	none	none	D.C. Cir.	affirmed
Baltimore and Potomac Railroad Company v. Cumberland	232 (1900)	Brown	none	none	D.C. Cir.	affirmed
United States v. Tennessee and Coosa Railroad Company	242 (1900)	McKenna	none	none	5th Cir.	reversed
Southern Railway Company v. Carnegie Steel Company	257 (1900)	Harlan	none	White	4th Cir.	affirmed
Lackawanna Iron and Coal Company v. Farmers' Loan and Trust Company	298 (1900)	Harlan	none	none	5th Cir.	affirmed
United States v. Parkhurst-Davis Mercantile Company	317 (1900)	Brewer	none	none	C.C.D. Kan.	affirmed
Florida Central and Peninsular Railroad Company v. Bell	321 (1900)	Shiras	none	none	5th Cir.	reversed
Adirondack Railway Company v. New York	335 (1900)	Fuller	none	none	N.Y.	affirmed
Thormann v. Frame	350 (1900)	Fuller	none	none	Wis. Cir. Ct.	affirmed
Benedict v. United States	357 (1900)	Brown	none	none	Ct. Cl.	affirmed
The Adula	361 (1900)	Brown	none	Shiras	S.D. Ga.	affirmed
Roller v. Holly	398 (1900)	Brown	none	none	Tex. Civ. App.	reversed
Moss v. Dowman	413 (1900)	Brewer	none	none	8th Cir.	affirmed
United States v. Ortiz	422 (1900)	White	none	none	Ct. Priv. Land Cl.	reversed
Guaranty Savings Bank v. Bladow	448 (1900)	Peckham	none	none	N.D. Dist. Ct.	affirmed
United States v. Gue Lim	459 (1900)	Peckham	none	none	D. Wash.	affirmed
Walsh v. Columbus, Hocking Valley and Athens Railroad Company	469 (1900)	Brown	none	none	Ohio	affirmed
Wright v. Columbus, Hocking Valley and Athens Railroad Company	481 (1900)	Brown	none	none	Ohio	affirmed
Warburton v. White	484 (1900)	White	none	none	Wash.	affirmed
Baltimore and Ohio Railroad Company v. Voigt	498 (1900)	Shiras	none	Harlan	6th Cir.	certification
Matteson v. Dent	521 (1900)	White	none	none	Minn.	affirmed
Jackson v. Emmons	532 (1900)	McKenna	none	none	D.C. Cir.	reversed
The Panama	535 (1900)	Gray	none	none	S.D. Fla.	affirmed
Weyerhaueser v. Minnesota	550 (1900)	McKenna	none	none	Minn.	affirmed
Whitman v. Oxford National Bank	559 (1900)	Brewer	none	none	2d Cir.	affirmed
The Benito Estenger	568 (1900)	Fuller	none	none	S.D. Fla.	affirmed
Maxwell v. Dow	581 (1900)	Peckham	none	Harlan	Utah	affirmed
Aldrich v. Chemical National Bank	618 (1900)	Harlan	none	none	6th Cir.	affirmed
Hancock National Bank v. Farnum	640 (1900)	Brewer	none	none	R.I.	reversed
Illinois Central Railroad Company v. City of Chicago	646 (1900)	Brown	none	none	Ill.	affirmed
Huntington v. Laidley	668 (1900)	Gray	none	Brewer	C.C.D.W. Va.	reversed

== See also ==
- Certificate of division
