= Funeral Oration (Lysias) =

390s BCE Ancient Greek speech

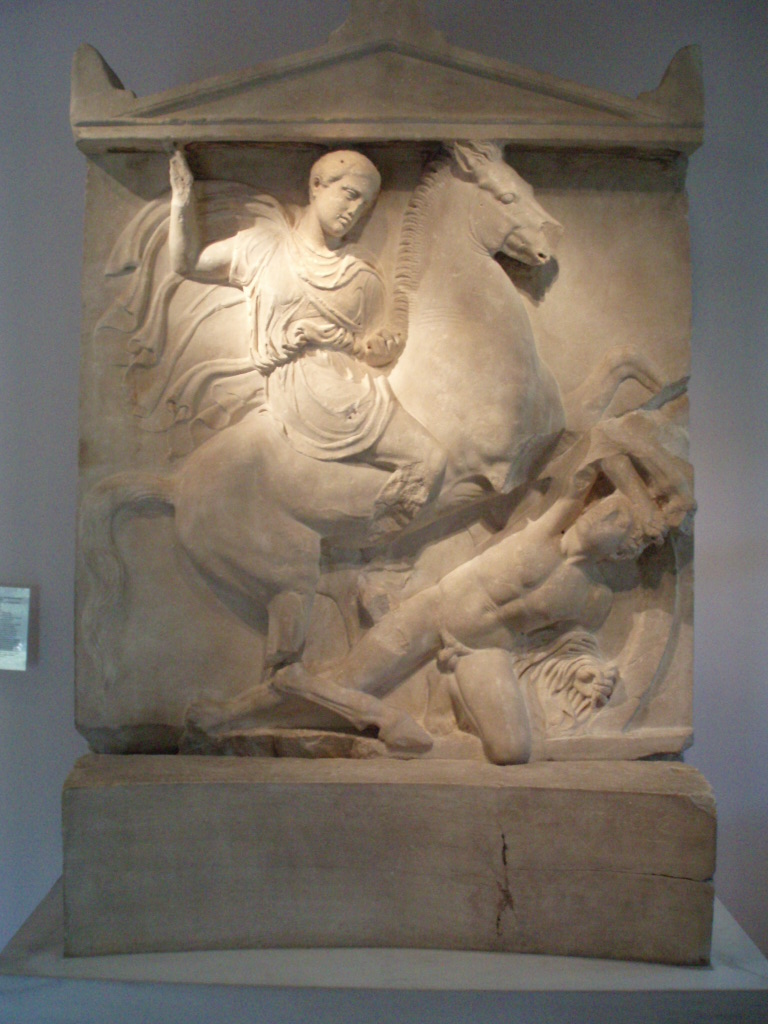
The Grave Stele of Dexileos, an Athenian killed fighting in the Corinthian War in 394 BCE

The "Funeral Oration" (Note: Numbered in modern editions of Lysias's works as the second speech, and therefore known as "Lysias 2".) is a speech written by the Athenian orator Lysias around the late 390s BCE. It purports to be the address given at the public funeral of Athens's war dead, commemorating those who died in a year of the Corinthian War, in which Athens sent troops to assist the city of Corinth against its rival Sparta.

It is unlikely that Lysias ever delivered the speech, as he was probably ineligible, as a metic (resident foreigner), to speak at the public funeral. It is known as an epideictic or "showpiece" work, and may have been composed as a rhetorical exercise or display of skill. The speech narrates several myths of Athens's past, including the Amazonomachy and the Athenians' part in the stories of the Seven against Thebes and the children of Heracles, as well as historical episodes from the Greco-Persian Wars and the Peloponnesian War between Athens and Sparta. The treatment of these stories glorifies heroic defeat as well as victory, and is unusual among Athenian funeral orations in commemorating the non-citizen dead alongside those of Athens.

The speech may have been the object of criticism and parody from Plato in his Menexenos, and has been criticised on artistic and stylistic grounds by modern scholars: both they and Plato tend to see it as highly conventional and awkward in its expression. In the late nineteenth and early twentieth centuries, several critics argued that it was not a work of Lysias, but rather a late fourth-century imitation by an unknown sophist. It may have been drawn upon by the rhetorician Isokrates for his Panegyrikos, written around 380 BCE.

== Background ==
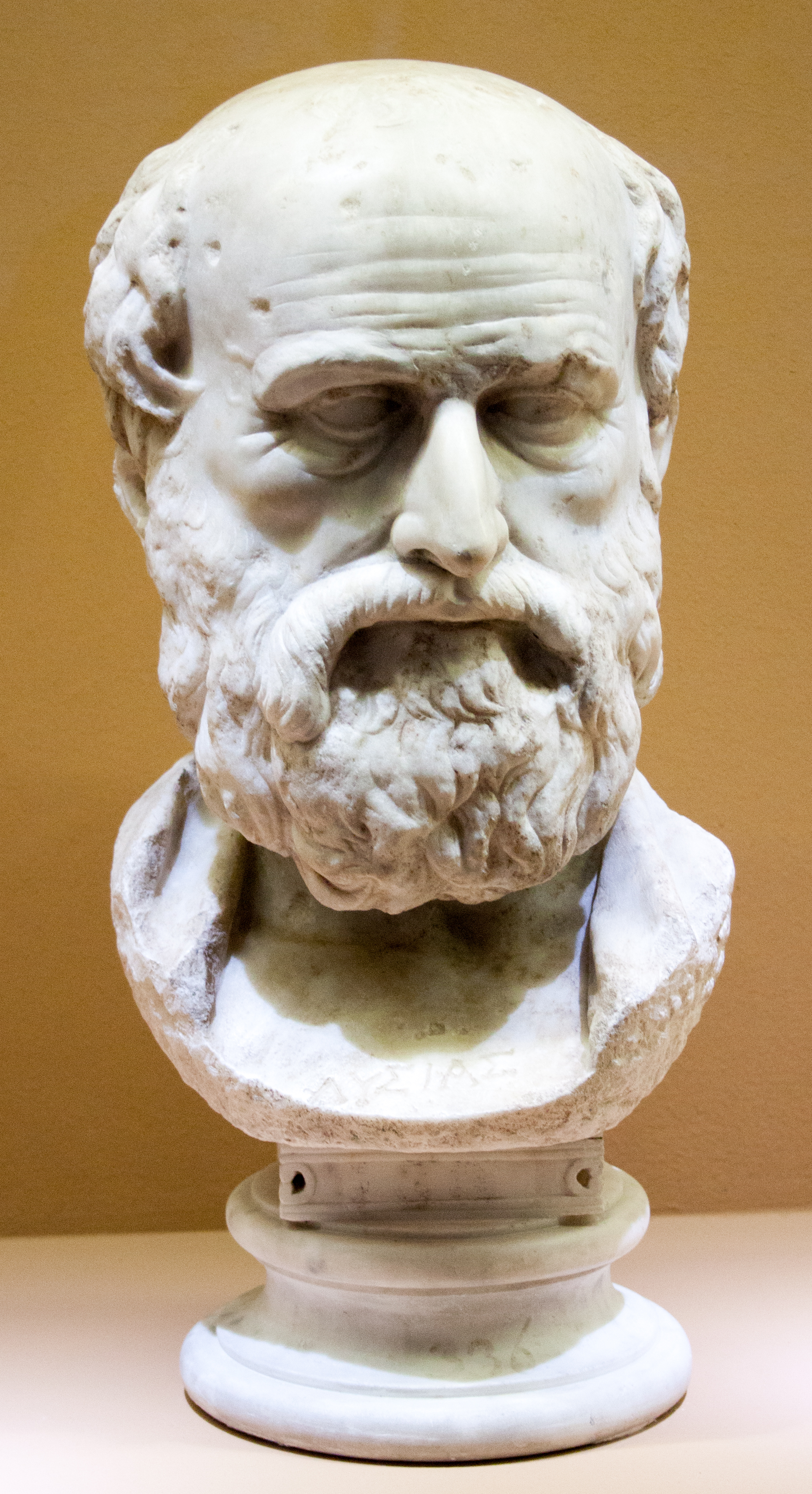
Roman portrait bust of Lysias, based on a Greek original of the fourth century BCE

Lysias, a native of Syracuse born around 445 BCE, was a son of Kephalos, a wealthy Syracusan who emigrated to Athens. Kephalos owned a shield factory in the Piraeus, the harbour district of Athens, in which nearly 120 slaves worked. As non-native Athenians living in Athens, he and Lysias were metics, which limited their social, economic and political rights: Kephalos may have been the wealthiest metic in the city. After the restoration of Athenian democracy in 403 BCE, Lysias became a successful speech-writer (logographos). He would later be included in the "Canon of the Attic Orators", considered to be a compilation of the ten best speechwriters from classical Athens, compiled in Alexandria between the third and first centuries BCE.

In any year in which Athenian citizens had been killed in war, a public funeral was held in which a funeral oration (epitaphios logos) was delivered by a leading citizen. By the time of Lysias, this had become practically an annual event, since Athens was more often at war than not. Lysias's "Funeral Oration" is constructed in the fashion of an idealised funerary speech. In the surviving manuscripts, it carries the title "Funeral oration for those who came to the aid of the Corinthians". It asserts itself as being in honour of those Athenians who died in a year of the Corinthian War (395–387 BCE), in which Athens sent troops to assist Corinth against its rival Sparta. If a genuine work of Lysias's, (Note: See § Authorship below.) the speech probably dates to the late 390s or shortly afterwards. Some indications within the text suggest that it was composed after 392–391, (Note: Specifically, its reference to the Walls of Konon being mostly complete.) and possibly that it was not completed until after the Peace of Antalcidas of 387 BCE.

The speech is known as an epideictic ('showpiece') speech, as opposed to one written for a courtroom trial. It may have been written imaginatively as an exercise or demonstration, rather than for delivery. As a metic, Lysias may not have been eligible to deliver the annual funeral oration, (Note: Both de Romilly and Blanshard state that he was not.) and in any case it would be overwhelmingly likely that a citizen would be chosen for this task: Stephen Todd further argues that it is unlikely that Lysias would have written a speech to be delivered by another at such an occasion, because the person chosen to give the speech would be selected partly on their ability to compose it. It may, therefore, have been composed as a rhetorical exercise or display of skill, perhaps for private performance.

== Synopsis ==
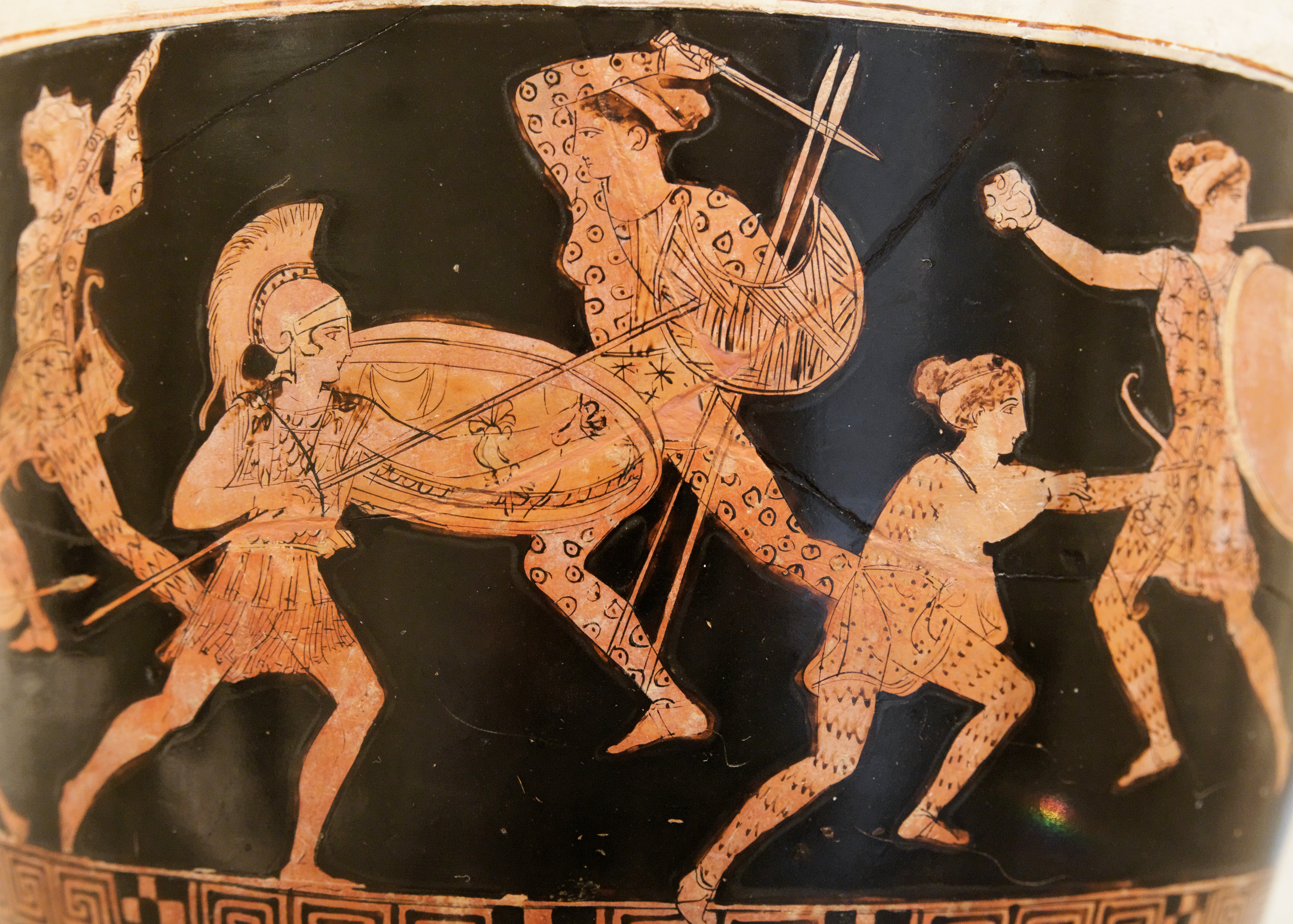
Fighting between Greeks and Amazons on an Attic lekythos, painted c. 420 BCE

In the speech's opening (exordium), Lysias's speaker proclaims himself unable to encapsulate the valour of the dead, and proposes therefore to honour ancient ancestors of the Athenians whose achievements should be glorified. (Note: Lysias 2.1–3.) He begins by narrating the myth of the Amazonomachy, and how the Amazons, "ruling over many nations", hubristically fought against the Athenians' ancestors, and the myth of the Seven against Thebes, in which the Athenian king Theseus sent an army to recover the bodies of the Argive champions whom the Thebans forbade to be buried in their land. (Note: Lysias 2.4–11.) Following this with the story of the Athenians' protection of the children of Heracles against Eurystheus, (Note: Lysias 2.11–16.) he argues that their ancestors set them the example of fighting on the side of justice. (Note: Lysias 2.17–19.)

Developing the argument, the speaker discusses the wars between Greece and Persia in the early fifth century BCE, praising the Athenians' victories at Marathon and Salamis as well as the heroic Spartan defeat at Thermopylae. (Note: Lysias 2.20–43.) He claims that the courage of the Athenians, who fought at the Battle of Plataea after many other Greeks had deserted, entitles them to the leadership of Greece. (Note: Lysias 2.44–47.) He then laments the decline of Athenian leadership following the defeat in the Peloponnesian War and at the naval Battle of Aegospotami, though claims that the courage of the Athenians in defeat again showed their quality and authority to lead the Greeks. (Note: Lysias 2.58–65.) He closes this section by mentioning the xenoi, non-Athenian Greeks who fought on behalf of the Athenian democrats at the Battle of Piraeus in 403, reminding the audience that they were given a public funeral and the same honours as the Athenian fallen. (Note: Lysias 2.66)

Returning to those being buried, he proclaims that the Athenians who fought at Corinth did so for Corinth's freedom, despite Corinth's historical alliance with Athens's enemy, Sparta. (Note: Lysias 2.67–68.) He contrasts the supposed misery of the Corinthians, as servile allies of Sparta, with the enviable nature of life as an Athenian, but argues that the Athenian dead died in a manner as pleasant as their lives, as they saved Athens from fighting a war at home and "restored the broken fortunes" of the Corinthians. (Note: Lysias 2.69–70.) He argues that no pleasure can be left for the living Athenians, since they have lost such noble citizens, and exhorts them to remember the dead, to live up to their example, and to respect and care for their surviving relatives as they would have. (Note: Lysias 2.71–76.)

In the speech's peroration, Lysias's speaker highlights the inevitability of death, and states that those who die "for the greatest and noblest ends" are the most fortunate of all, and that their valour and memory are immortal. He therefore claims to envy the fallen Athenians, and yet calls upon the living to honour tradition by lamenting for them as they are buried. (Note: Lysias 2.77–81.)

== Reception and analysis ==
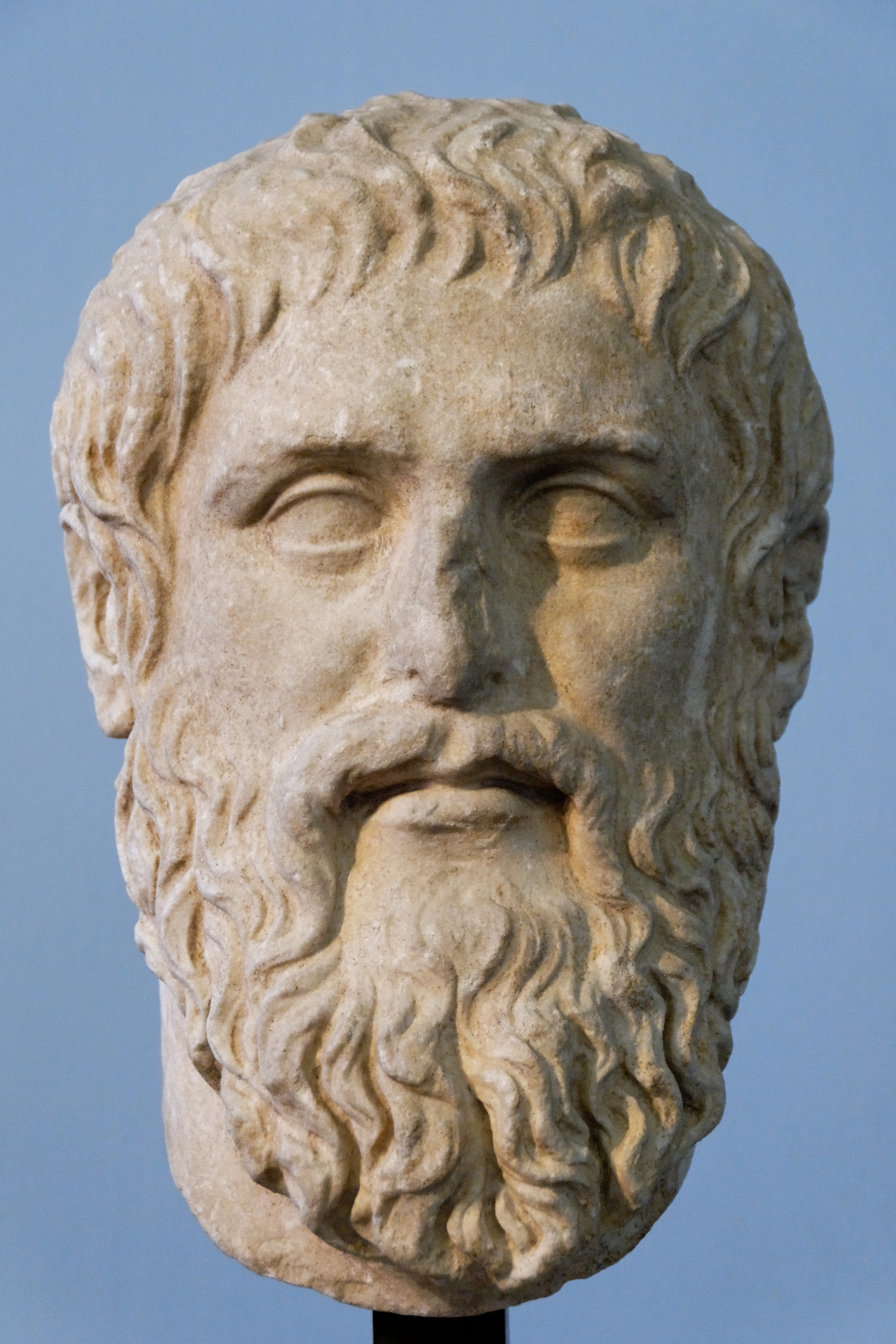
Roman copy of a portrait of Plato, originally made c. 370 BCE

Dino Piovan writes that Lysias emphasises the value of civic harmony throughout the speech, promoting it to a defining value of Athenian democracy. Todd considers a particularly interesting feature of the speech to be its celebration of brave defeat against the odds, specifically with reference to the Battle of Aegospotami of 405 BCE, in which the Spartan navy destroyed the Athenian fleet. Alastair Blanshard traces a "metic sensibility" in the commemoration of the xenoi ('foreigners') buried in Athens's public cemetery, which has no precedent in Athenian oratory, but considers that the speech otherwise "perpetuates the Athenocentrism of the genre". (Note: Blanshard 2024, p. 218, citing Lysias 2.66.)

Lysias's speech may have been the object of satire in Plato's Menexenos, written at roughly the same time as the speech, which includes a parodic funeral oration. Plato implicitly compares Lysias's speech with the shields mass-produced by the armoury owned by his family, suggesting that the oratory in turn was unoriginal and workmanlike. Ancient critics, including the first-century BCE grammarian Theon, believed that the rhetorician Isokrates drew on Lysias's funeral oration for his Panegyrikos, written around 380 BCE; Todd considers them to have been correct.

Richard Claverhouse Jebb considered that the speech lacked Lysias's usual hallmarks of simplicity, grace, clarity and symmetry: (Note: Cited in Lamb 1930, p. 29.) Walter Lamb hypothesises that Lysias may have been "somewhat embarrassed by the traditional theme of ancestral valour, and showed a certain awkwardness of experiment in an attempt to rival the sententious formality of the sophists". David Sansone describes the speech as having a "very generic, stereotypical quality". Jacqueline de Romilly considers it, along with the Olympiakos (Lysias's other surviving epideictic speech) of "mediocre quality ... [and] more important as [a document] in the history of ideas than as [a] literary [work]". (Note: The Erotikos, transmitted in Plato's Phaedrus and attributed there to Lysias, is also an epideictic speech, but de Romilly does not consider this likely to have been his work.) Nicole Loraux called it "a perfect example" of a funerary oration, and as representative of the genre in the fourth century BCE. (Note: Quoted in Blanshard 2024, p. 200.)

== Transmission and authorship ==
As with all of Lysias's surviving speeches, the "Funeral Oration" was transmitted in a manuscript known as Codex Palatinus Graecus 88 (or MS X), which probably dates to the twelfth or thirteenth century. In turn, MS X was probably based on an earlier anthology, which may have presented Lysias's works alongside those of other orators: Christopher Carey conjecturally dates this anthology to the fourth century CE, but notes that an earlier date would be compatible with the evidence.

In the late nineteenth and early twentieth centuries, several scholars (including E. Wolff, Richard Richter and Jebb) argued that Lysias's funeral oration borrowed from (and therefore postdated) Isokrates's Panegyrikos. Given that the latest securely identified speeches of Lysias date to the late 380s, and Isokrates's speech must have been written after 387, this left little room for Lysias to have composed the speech, and raised the suggestion that the funeral oration was in fact composed by a late fourth-century sophist in imitation of his style. Modern scholarship, however, generally considers Isokrates's speech the later.

Other arguments advanced against Lysias's authorship include the claim that it has stylistic weaknesses. In 1887, Friedrich Blass accused the speech of overusing the literary devices of paranomasia (punning), homeoteleuton (repetition of word endings) and parallelism, which he claimed as evidence of a "sophist adorning himself with vain tinsel". (Note: Quoted in Todd 2007, p. 158, n. 45.) It has also been argued, including by Blass, that the lack of mention of the speech by Dionysius of Halicarnassus in his first-century BCE commentary on Lysias indicates that it is not of Lysianic authorship, (Note: Stephen Todd contests this, pointing out that Dionysius also does not discuss most of Isokrates's forensic speeches, which are known to be genuine.) and that Aristotle cites a passage similar to but substantially different from Lysias 2.60, which could be either a misquotation of Lysias or a faithful transmission of a more famous prototype on which a spurious "Lysianic" speech may have been based. Dino Piovan, in 2023, wrote that "there is no substantial reason to exclude Lysias's paternity, whereas there are some good reasons to support it".

== Bibliography ==
- Blanshard, Alistair J. L. (2024). "Authorship and Ideology in Lysias's Funeral Oration". In Pritchard, David M. (ed.). The Athenian Funeral Oration After Nicole Loraux. Cambridge University Press. pp. 198–220. doi:10.1017/9781009413053. ISBN 978-1-009-41305-3.
- de Romilly, Jacqueline (1985) [1980]. A Short History of Greek Literature. Translated by Doherty, Lillian. University of Chicago Press. ISBN 0-226-14311-2.
- Dover, Kenneth (1968). Lysias and the Corpus Lysiacum. Berkeley and Los Angeles: University of California Press. ISBN 978-0-520-30214-3.
- Gunderson, Erik (2009). "Appendix 2: Authors and Prominent Individuals". In Gunderson, Erik (ed.). The Cambridge Companion to Ancient Rhetoric. Cambridge University Press. pp. 299–313. doi:10.1017/CCOL9780521860543. ISBN 978-1-139-00256-1.
- Lamb, Walter R. M. (1930). Lysias. Loeb Classical Library. Vol. 244. Cambridge, MA: Harvard University Press. doi:10.4159/DLCL.lysias-1_murder_eratosthenes.1930. OCLC 551433390.
- Morris, Ian (1992). Death-Ritual and Social Structure in Classical Antiquity. Key Themes in Ancient History. Cambridge University Press. ISBN 0-521-37465-0.
- Phillips, David D. (2013). The Law of Ancient Athens. Ann Arbor: University of Michigan Press. ISBN 978-0-472-11887-8.
- Piovan, Dino (2023). "The Athenian Civil War According to Lysias's Funeral Oration". In Kapellos, Aggelos (ed.). The Orators and Their Treatment of the Recent Past. Berlin: De Gruyter. pp. 119–134. ISBN 978-3-11-079181-5.
- Pritchard, David M. (2024). "The Funeral Oration after Loraux". In Pritchard, David M. (ed.). The Athenian Funeral Oration after Nicole Loraux. Cambridge University Press. pp. 1–56. doi:10.1017/9781009413053. ISBN 978-1-009-41305-3.
- Roberts, John W. (1998) [1984]. City of Sokrates: An Introduction to Classical Athens (2nd ed.). London: Routledge. ISBN 0-415-16777-9.
- Sansone, David, ed. (2020). Plato: Menexenus. Cambridge Greek and Latin Classics. Cambridge University Press. doi:10.1017/9781108582544 (inactive 22 July 2025). ISBN 978-1-108-58254-4.
- Todd, Stephen C. (2007). A Commentary on Lysias, Speeches 1–11. Oxford University Press. ISBN 978-0-19-814909-5.
- Viidebaum, Laura (2021). Creating the Ancient Rhetorical Tradition. Cambridge Classical Monographs. Cambridge University Press. doi:10.1017/9781108873956. ISBN 978-1-108-87395-6.
