= Patriarch of the West =

One of the official titles of the pope

Extract from the oration delivered by Girolamo Vincentini at the funeral of Pope Clement XI, 1721: "Truly, the Roman antistes (chief priest, pontiff) [holds] three [authorities]: the first, because he is the Praeses (governor) of the Roman church and of the suburbicarian cities; the second, because he is the Patriarch of the West; the third, because he is the moderator and princeps of the entire Church."

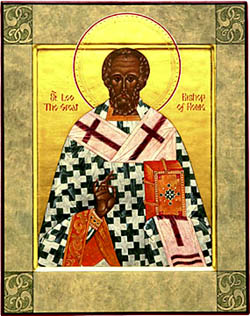
Byzantine-style icon of Pope Leo I (400–461), the first pope to be called patriarch of the West.

Patriarch of the West (Latin: patriarcha occidentis, occidentis patriarcha) is one of the official titles of the bishop of Rome as patriarch and highest authority of the Latin Church.

== History ==
The origin of the definition of the patriarch of the West is linked to the disestablishment of the ancient system based on the three apostolic centers of Rome, Antioch (both founded by Saint Peter) and Patriarchy of Alexandria (founded by Saint Mark, the disciple of Peter), and the establishment, despite papal opposition, of the new Pentarchy, with the First Council of Constantinople in 381 and the Council of Chalcedon in 451, which led to the elevation of the Patriarchates of Constantinople and Jerusalem. In this system, with the exception of Rome, the other four patriarchates fell under the authority of the Byzantine Empire and came to correspond with territorially well-defined entities. Rome, on the other hand, became the seat with authority over the territories of the Western Roman Empire.

In 450, Byzantine Emperor Theodosius II addressed a letter to Pope Leo I, in which he explicitly mentioned him as a patriarch for the West (this is the first mention of a pope in this capacity). After the Western Roman Empire collapsed in 476 and Justinian I extended the eastern legislation on Rome with the Pragmatic sanction of 554, the imperial ecclesiastical system of the Pentarchy was fully put into effect. In 642, as the Byzantine emperors were imposing the support for Miaphysitism on the popes, Pope Theodore I formally assumed for the first time the title of patriarch of the West.

On 22 March 2006, the Vatican released a statement explaining the omission of the title from the Annuario Pontificio on the grounds of expressing a "historical and theological reality" and of "being useful to ecumenical dialogue". The Vatican stated that the title patriarch of the West symbolized the pope's special relationship with, and jurisdiction over, the Latin Church—and that the omission of the title neither symbolizes in any way a change in this relationship, nor distorts the relationship between the Holy See and the Eastern Churches, as solemnly proclaimed by the Second Vatican Council.

In 2024, Pope Francis revived the title, reversing Pope Benedict XVI’s 2006 dropping of it.
