= Almeida-Sanchez v. United States =

- Supreme Court of the United States

Argued March 19, 28, 1973 Decided June 21, 1973
- Full case name: Almeida-Sanchez v. United States
- Citations: 413 U.S. 266 (more) 93 S. Ct. 2535; 37 L. Ed. 2d 596; 1973 U.S. LEXIS 44

Case history
- Prior: United States v. Almeida-Sanchez, 452 F.2d 459 (9th Cir. 1971); cert. granted, 406 U.S. 944 (1972).

Holding
- Searches of automobiles must still have probable cause even in the absence of a warrant.

Court membership
- Chief Justice Warren E. Burger Associate Justices William O. Douglas · William J. Brennan Jr. Potter Stewart · Byron White; Thurgood Marshall · Harry Blackmun; Lewis F. Powell Jr. · William Rehnquist

Case opinions
- Majority: Stewart, joined by Douglas, Brennan, Marshall, Powell
- Concurrence: Powell
- Dissent: White, joined by Burger, Blackmun, Rehnquist

Laws applied
- U.S. Const. amend. IV

Almeida-Sanchez v. United States, 413 U.S. 266 (1973), was a United States Supreme Court case holding that the search of an automobile by the United States Border Patrol without a warrant or probable cause violates the Fourth Amendment. The vehicle was stopped and searched for illegal aliens twenty-five miles (40 km) from the Mexican border. The Court approached the search from four views: automobile search, administrative inspection, heavily regulated industry inspection, and border search. As to the validity of the search under the automobile exception, the Court found no justification for the search under the Carroll doctrine because there was no probable cause. As to the validity of the search under various administrative inspection doctrines, the Court found that the officers lacked an area warrant. As to the validity of the heavily regulated industry inspection, the Court found that the doctrine is not applicable to traveling on a state highway. As to the validity of a border search, the Court found that the site of the stop and the entirety of the road on which the stop occurred was too far from the border to be considered a border search.

== Background ==
Condrado Almeida-Sanchez was a Mexican citizen who held a valid American work permit. Shortly after midnight, Border Patrol officers stopped Almeida-Sanchez and thoroughly searched his vehicle. The officers stopped Almeida-Sanchez on California Highway 78 at a point twenty-five air miles north of the Mexican border. Highway 78 ran East to West and did not connect to the border. At the time, Border Patrol efforts to identify individuals who have recently entered the United States without authorization included the following: permanent checkpoints, temporary checkpoints, and roving patrols. Almeida-Sanchez was stopped by a roving patrol. The Border Patrol officers did not have a warrant to stop Almeida-Sanchez, and the United States conceded that the officers did not have probable cause or reasonable suspicion to justify the stop or the subsequent vehicle search.

In searching behind and under the back seat of the vehicle, the officers found marijuana and arrested Almeida-Sanchez. Almeida-Sanchez moved to suppress the marijuana because the officers found it through an unconstitutional search, violating the Fourth Amendment. The United States argued that the Immigration and Nationality Act Section 287(a)(3) authorizes warrantless searches of vehicles within a reasonable distance of the land border. The United States further noted that regulations adopted by the Attorney General define this distance to be within 100 miles.

The District Court for the Southern District of California denied Almeida-Sanchez's motion to suppress. The evidence of the marijuana was admitted and he was convicted of knowingly receiving, concealing and facilitating the transportation of a large quantity of unlawfully imported marijuana. He was sentenced to five years in prison. Almeida-Sanchez appealed his conviction arguing that the search of his car violated the Fourth Amendment. The Ninth Circuit upheld his conviction. Almeida-Sanchez appealed to the Supreme Court of the United States. The Supreme Court reversed.

== Supreme Court Opinion ==
=== Justice Stewart's majority ===
Justice Stewart delivered the opinion of the Court. The Supreme Court held that the roving patrol's warrantless search of Almeida-Sanchez's car without probable cause or Almeida-Sanchez's consent violated the Fourth Amendment right to be free from unreasonable searches and seizures. Although there are exceptions to the requirement to get a warrant, the Court held that none of the exceptions applied in this case.

First, the Carroll exception did not apply here. In Carroll v. United States, the Court permitted a warrantless search of a vehicle because officers risked losing evidence if the car left their jurisdiction while they try to secure a warrant. But the officers in Carroll still had probable cause to stop the vehicle and to search it. In this case, the United States conceded that the Border Patrol officers did not have probable cause to stop Almeida-Sanchez or to search his vehicle. The Court wrote that “the Carroll doctrine does not declare a field day for the police in searching automobiles. Automobile or no automobile, there must be probable cause for the search.” Because the United States admitted that the officers did not have probable cause, the Court held that the Carroll exception was not applicable.

Second, the administrative search doctrine did not apply to this case. In Camara v. Municipal Court, the Supreme Court permitted administrative inspections to enforce health and welfare regulations where the inspector did not have probable cause to inspect a particular dwelling. The Court required inspectors performing administrative searches to obtain either consent or an area warrant describing the physical and demographic characteristics of the area to be searched. Here, Border Patrol did not have an area warrant that authorized stopping Almeida-Sanchez and searching his vehicle. The officials who stopped Almeida-Sanchez exercised “unfettered discretion.” The Court found that the officers' discretion was not sufficiently circumscribed by an area warrant to be a constitutionally permissible administrative search.

Third, the doctrine permitting administrative inspection of heavily regulated industries without warrants or probable cause did not apply to this case. In Colonnade Catering Corp. v. United States, the Court upheld warrantless inspections of a company for its liquor sales and manufacturing. In United States v. Biswell, the Court upheld a warrantless inspection of a gun retailer. For each of these, the Court noted that the businesses operated in heavily regulated industries with well-established licensing and compliance requirements. Entering into these industries entails knowledge that business records will be subject to inspection, which limits the owner's justifiable expectation of privacy. Because Almeida-Sanchez was not engaged in a heavily regulated business, this exception did not apply to the search of his vehicle. The Court further noted that in Colonnade and Biswell inspectors also had specific knowledge that the businesses did actually sell liquor and guns, respectively. In Almeida-Sanchez's case, the officers did not even have suspicion that a border crossing occurred.

After finding that no warrant exceptions applied here, the Court considered validity of Section 287(a)(3) of the Immigration and Nationality Act and its associated regulations authorizing warrantless searches of vehicles within 100 miles of the land border. The Court did not declare the provision unconstitutional, but adopted an interpretation of the statute that would not authorize warrantless stops and searches like the one in Almeida-Sanchez's case. In determining whether a warrantless, suspicionless stop is permitted under INA Section 287(a)(3), courts must consider context. Congress has the right to exclude individuals from entering the United States. Incident to this power, Congress may require searches of each individual seeking entry into the United States, as well as her vehicle. This also applies to functional equivalents, like disembarking from an international flight in airports far from the land border. In the context here, where the roving patrol stopped Almeida-Sanchez over twenty miles from the land border on a road that does not lead to the border, the stop and search was not a functional equivalent of a border search. The stop and search were therefore not permitted under the Court's interpretation of the statute.

=== Justice Powell's concurrence ===
Justice Powell agreed with the Court that the Border Patrol's stop and search of Almeida-Sanchez was not a border search or a functional equivalent that would eliminate the requirement for a warrant and/or probable cause. Justice Powell also explains the government interest in having roving patrols: many individuals enter the United States unlawfully, avoiding designated points of entry, and meet with someone who will transport them in a vehicle. Justice Powell accepts that roving patrols are the only feasible way of apprehending someone who enters the United States this way.

Justice Powell discusses the administrative search exception to a particularized warrant and writes that he finds the roving patrols to fit in the doctrine. Like in Camara, roving patrols lack particularized suspicion but often have general suspicion that a particular route is used to transport individuals who are in the United States without authorization. Also like in Camara, this use of roving patrols is not to enforce the criminal law, but is administrative in nature—to apprehend and remove individuals present without authorization. And in this case, although not a border search itself, the roving patrols perform searches incidental to protecting the land border. Vehicles are important tools in transporting individuals present without authorization. Justice Powell points out lower court approval of the searches, lack of reasonable alternatives to roving patrols, and the modest intrusion on individual interests of searching a vehicle. These considerations direct his finding that under limited circumstances, there could be a constitutionally adequate equivalent of probable cause to permit roving patrol searches in border areas.

Justice Powell then makes similar findings to the Majority and notes that there is no exception to the warrant requirement in this case. Because the exceptions do not apply, Justice Powell notes that Border Patrol officers needed consent or a warrant to search Almeida-Sanchez's vehicle as they did. Justice Powell goes on to note that this warrant requirement might be solved by getting an area warrant. He notes that this would bring the searches within the administrative search doctrine. Justice Powell specifically finds that area warrants likely will not frustrate the purpose of the searches. He also notes that it would not be infeasible for Border Patrol to get area warrants before commencing a roving patrol. Here, no area warrant meant the search of Almeida-Sanchez's vehicle was unconstitutional and his conviction must be reversed.

Justice Powell concludes his opinion by proposing relevant factors to consider in evaluating whether there is probable cause (or a functional equivalent) for a roving patrol. His test intends to balance an individual's interest in her Fourth Amendment rights with legitimate governmental interests.

=== Justice White's dissent ===
Justice White wrote the dissent, which Chief Justice Burger, Justice Blackmun, and Justice Rehnquist joined. The dissenters would have held that neither probable cause nor a warrant was necessary in this case because the proper Fourth Amendment standard is reasonableness.

Justice White notes the special context in this case due to the stop's proximity to the border. He notes that many cases permit unfettered searches at the border and at fixed checkpoints near the border. Justice White then discusses cases in which something less than probable cause justified a search, noting that the search was still reasonable and lawful under the Fourth Amendment. Next, Justice White discusses the heavily regulated industry cases cited in the Majority. He notes that inspectors conducting the searches in those cases had neither a warrant nor probable cause but that the searches were lawful because they were reasonable.

Justice White then notes that reasonableness should be interpreted broadly where there is a federal statute permitting the challenged conduct. He writes that this respects “the considered judgment of Congress that proper enforcement of the immigration laws requires random searches of vehicles without warrant or probable cause within a reasonable distance of the international borders of the country.” This is rooted in Congress's power to exclude, and Justice White finds that there should be deference to Congress's choice of enforcement mechanisms.

Justice White then notes that INA Section 287(a)(3) only permits these warrantless, suspicionless searches for finding people. They do not permit warrantless, suspicionless searches of one's person or for contraband. This is a limited invasion into a person's privacy interests.

Finding that the border is a zone and not a line, Justice White concludes that after balancing the government interest with the interests of the individual, the search of Almeida-Sanchez's vehicle was reasonable. Justice White then cites circuit court opinions affirming the constitutionality of similar searches. He would hold that both stopping the vehicle and searching it was reasonable and that INA Section 287(a)(3) was validly applied.

== Subsequent developments regarding roving patrols and border searches ==
In the years immediately following Almeida-Sanchez, the Supreme Court decided a series of cases regarding the implications of its holding. These cases further clarified the powers of law enforcement to search for undocumented people at and near the Mexican border.

- United States v. Brignoni-Ponce (ethnicity alone is not sufficient for reasonable suspicion to justify a search for undocumented immigrants)
- United States v. Ortiz (traffic checkpoints removed from the border do not permit Border Patrol officers to search the vehicle for undocumented immigrants without suspicion or a warrant)
- United States v. Martinez-Fuerte (warrantless, suspicionless searches at border checkpoints are permissible)
