= Erotic Essay =

Speech attributed to Demosthenes

The "Erotic Essay" (Ancient Greek: Ἐρωτικός) was one of the two surviving epideictic speeches (along with the Funeral Oration) attributed to the Athenian statesman and orator Demosthenes. Ian Worthington dates the speech to between the late 350s BC and 335 BC. Though part of the Demosthenic corpus, the Erotic Essay is not generally believed to be an authentic work of Demosthenes, and its real author is unknown. However, Robert Clavaud has argued that there are no strong arguments for the inauthenticity of the epideictic speeches, against almost unanimous scholarly consensus to the contrary.

Friedrich Blass believes that it belongs to a member of a school of Isocrates. Ian Worthington believes that the content and style of the Erotic Essay is the most removed from Demosthenes' other writings and asserts that the oration is influenced by both Plato and Isocrates. Usher believes that the essay is more similar to the style of Isocrates' school than it is to Demosthenes.

The essay is written for a fictional youth named Epicrates. The author attempts to counsel Epicrates and the audience on what is best for a person. He maintains that through the study of philosophy a person will become a virtuous citizen.
