= Demosthenes's Funeral Oration =

Speech attributed to Demosthenes

Demosthenes's "Funeral Oration" (Greek: Ἐπιτάφιος Λόγος) was delivered between August and September of 338 BC, just after the Battle of Chaeronea. It and the Erotic Essay are the only two surviving epideictic orations of Demosthenes.

== Historical background ==
In 338 BC Philip II of Macedon defeated the smaller combined forces of Athens and Thebes, securing Macedonian hegemony in Greece. Philip was however indulgent towards Athens. He actually proposed a new peace treaty, whose terms were quite favorable for the defeated party. Demosthenes prompted the fortification of Athens and was appointed by ecclesia to the duty of delivering over them the customary funeral speech, honoring the Athenians who died for their city. Although the Athenian statesman was the leader of the anti-Macedonian faction, his countrymen chose him for this honorable duty and not Demades or Aeschines, who were more pleasing to the King of Macedon. Demosthenes's selection to deliver this speech shows his political influence in Athens, despite the fact that his anti-Macedonian policy had resulted in the total defeat of his city.

Demosthenes was proud for this special honor and in On the Crown admonished Aeschines with the following words:

Our city owes to me, Aeschines, both the inception and the success of many great and noble enterprises; nor was she unmindful. It is a proof of her gratitude that, when the people wanted one who should speak over the bodies of the slain, shortly after the battle, you were nominated but they did not appoint you, in spite of your beautiful voice, nor Demades, although he had recently arranged the peace, nor Hegemon, nor any of your party: they appointed me. Then you came forward, and Pythocles with you--and, gracious Heavens! how coarsely and impudently you spoke!--making the very same charges that you have repeated today; but, for all your scurrility, they appointed me nevertheless.

== The speech ==
=== Scheme of the oration ===
- Preamble
- Paragraph 1: Difficulties of the assigned duty
- Paragraph 2: Purpose of the speech
- Main content
- Paragraphs 3–35: Praise of the bravery of the Athenians – They were beaten because of their bad luck and because of the mistakes committed by the Thebans – Praise of the Athenian democracy
- Epilogue
- Paragraphs 36–37: Those dead are possessors of deathless honors.

=== Content of the oration ===
In the preamble the orator declares his intention not only to laud the bravery of those who died at the field of the battle but to mention as well the achievements of their ancestors (2).

In the beginning of the main part of the speech, he underscores that the Athenians are acknowledged to be true gentlemen (7) and the indigenous children of this land (4). He then exposes the mythological history of his city (8–11) and links his speech with the deeds of those dead at the field of the battle (12). He praises their virtues and bravery (15). He maintained that the Athenians were the first to foresee the growing power of Macedon and demonstrated a sound judgment joined with public spirit (18). According to the orator, his countrymen have to thank the valor of these men, along with the folly of their opponents, that Philip did not set foot upon our land (20). After all, Demosthenes regards as responsible for the defeat those of the Thebans who were appointed to the command (22), while he believes that the freedom of the whole Greek world was being preserved in the souls of these men (23). In the next paragraphs, the orator links the virtue of these men with the form of the Athenian government (25). For shame at the thought of subsequent reproaches, they manfully faced the threat arising from our foes and chose a noble death in preference to life and disgrace (26). According to the orator, it is impossible for those who commit a shameful act to appease all the citizens (26). Demosthenes then mentions in detail the role of the Athenian tribes, which nursed these brave men (27). He then points out that the living kinsmen of these dead deserve their sympathy and respect (32). Thereby, the children of these men shall be reared in honor and their parents shall enjoy distinction (33). The orator declares those dead be now seated beside the gods below, possessing the same rank as the brave men who have preceded them in the islands of the blest (34).

In the epilogue, Demosthenes asserts that it is a grievous thing for fathers and mothers to be deprived of their children and in their old age to lack the care of those who are nearest and dearest to them, but it is a proud privilege to behold them possessors of deathless honors and a memorial of their valor erected by the State, and deemed deserving of sacrifices and games for all future time (36). The orator closes his speech telling that it is painful for children to be orphaned of a father, but it is a beautiful thing to be the heir of a father's fame (37). As for Demosthenes himself, it has not been my concern how I might make a long speech, but how I might speak the truth (37).

== Authorship of the speech ==
Dionysius of Halicarnassus questioned the authorship of the speech and asserted that the style of the oration is unworthy of Demosthenes. Nineteenth century scholarship tended to agree with Dionysius of Hallicarnassus, and this view continued to be held by scholars of the twentieth century.

However, from the beginning of the twentieth century, arguments began to be made for the authenticity of the Funeral Speech. As early as 1928, Ioannis Sykutris argued that the speech is genuine. Robert Clavaud, the editor of the Budé edition of the Funeral Speech, argued that evidence of its inauthenticity is lacking, while N.W. and N.J. DeWitt, in the Loeb edition, leave the verdict open. More recently, Frangeskou has come down in favour of authenticity.

== See also ==
- Funeral oration (ancient Greece)
