= Pericles's Funeral Oration =

Speech during the Peloponnesian War

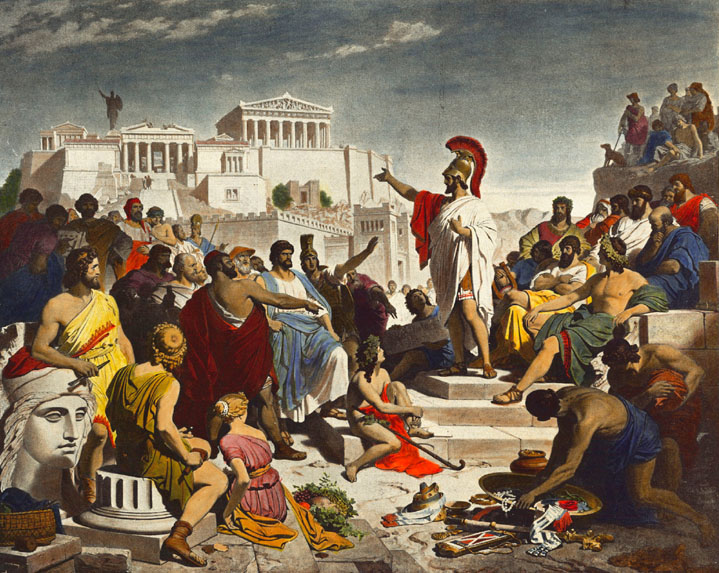
- Pericles's Funeral Oration (Perikles hält die Leichenrede) by Philipp Foltz (1852)
- Date: Winter of 431–430 BC
- Location: Kerameikos, Athens
- Type: Funeral oration (Epitaphios logos)
- Theme: Athenian democracy, civic virtue, and patriotism
- Cause: Public funeral for the Athenian dead of the first year of the Peloponnesian War
- Participants: Pericles, citizens and residents of Athens
- Outcome: Rallied short-term Athenian morale during the Peloponnesian War; became a foundational text on democracy
- Recorded and likely reconstructed by Thucydides in his History of the Peloponnesian War

"Pericles's Funeral Oration" is a famous speech from Thucydides's History of the Peloponnesian War. The speech was supposed to have been delivered by Pericles, an eminent Athenian politician, at the end of the first year of the Peloponnesian War (431–404 BC) as a part of the annual public funeral for the war dead.

== Background ==
By the late 5th century BC, it was customary for Athens to hold a public funeral in honour of all those who had died in war. The remains of the dead were left in a tent for three days, then a funeral procession was held with ten cypress coffins carrying the remains. Each coffin represented one of the Athenian tribes, and another was kept empty, symbolizing the missing and unrecovered. Finally, they were buried at a public grave (at Kerameikos) and a speech was delivered by a prominent Athenian citizen chosen by the state.

Several funeral orations from classical Athens survive, which seem to corroborate Thucydides's assertion that this was a regular feature of Athenian funerary custom in wartime. (Note: The funeral orations of Lysias, Demosthenes, and Hyperides. Additionally Plato authored a possibly satirical version of a funeral oration, the Menexenus.)

The "Funeral Oration" was recorded by Thucydides in book two of his famous History of the Peloponnesian War. Although Thucydides records the speech in the first person as if it were a word-for-word record of what Pericles said, there can be little doubt that he edited the speech. Thucydides says early in his History that the speeches presented are not verbatim records but are instead intended to represent the main ideas of what was said and what was, according to Thucydides, "called for in the situation". It can be reasonably assumed that Pericles delivered a speech at the end of the first year of the war, but there is no consensus as to what degree Thucydides's record resembles Pericles's actual speech. (Note: The bibliography on this topic is enormous.) Another confusing factor is that Pericles is known to have delivered another funeral oration in 440 BC during the Samian War. It is possible that elements of both speeches are represented in Thucydides's version. Nevertheless, Thucydides was extremely meticulous in his documentation, and records the varied certainty of his sources each time. Significantly, he begins recounting the speech by saying: "Περικλῆς ὁ Ξανθίππου... ἔλεγε τοιάδε", i.e. "Pericles, son of Xanthippos, spoke like this". Had he quoted the speech verbatim, he would have written "τάδε" ("this", or "these words") instead of "τοιάδε" ("like this" or "words like these"). The authorship of the "Funeral Oration" is also not certain. Plato, in his Menexenus, ascribes authorship to Pericles's companion, Aspasia.

== Content of the speech ==
The "Funeral Oration" is significant because it differs from the usual form of Athenian funeral speeches. David Cartwright describes it as "a eulogy of Athens itself...". The speech glorifies Athens' achievements, designed to stir the spirits of a state still at war.

=== Proemium (2.35) ===
The speech begins by praising the custom of the public funeral for the dead, but criticises the inclusion of the speech, arguing that the "reputations of many brave men" should "not be imperilled in the mouth of a single individual". Pericles argues that the speaker of the oration has the impossible task of satisfying the associates of the dead, who would wish that their deeds be magnified, while everyone else might feel jealous and suspect exaggeration.

=== Praise of the dead in war (2.36–2.42) ===
Pericles begins by praising the dead, as the other Athenian funeral orations do, by regard for the ancestors of present-day Athenians (2.36.1–3), touching briefly on the acquisition of the empire.

At this point, however, Pericles departs most dramatically from the example of other Athenian funeral orations and skips over the great martial achievements of Athens' past: "That part of our history which tells of the military achievements which gave us our several possessions, or of the ready valour with which either we or our fathers stemmed the tide of Hellenic or foreign aggression, is a theme too familiar to my hearers for me to dwell upon, and I shall therefore pass it by." Instead, Pericles proposes to focus on "the road by which we reached our position, the form of government under which our greatness grew, and the national habits out of which it sprang". This amounts to a focus on present-day Athens; Thucydides's Pericles thus decides to praise the war dead by glorifying the city for which they died.

==== The greatness of Athens ====
"If we look to the laws, they afford equal justice to all in their private differences ... if a man is able to serve the state, he is not hindered by the obscurity of his condition. The freedom we enjoy in our government extends also to our ordinary life. There, far from exercising a jealous surveillance over each other, we do not feel called upon to be angry with our neighbour for doing what he likes." These lines form the roots of the famous phrase "equal justice under law." The liberality of which Pericles spoke also extended to Athens' foreign policy: "We throw open our city to the world, and never by alien acts exclude foreigners from any opportunity of learning or observing, although the eyes of an enemy may occasionally profit by our liberality ..." Yet Athens's values of equality and openness do not, according to Pericles, hinder Athens' greatness; indeed, they enhance it: "... advancement in public life falls to reputations for capacity, class considerations not being allowed to interfere with merit ... our ordinary citizens, though occupied with the pursuits of industry, are still fair judges of public matters ... at Athens we live exactly as we please, and yet are just as ready to encounter every legitimate danger."

In the climax of his praise of Athens, Pericles declares: "In short, I say that as a city we are the school of Hellas; while I doubt if the world can produce a man, who, where he has only himself to depend upon, is equal to so many emergencies, and graced by so happy a versatility as the Athenian." Finally, Pericles links his praise of the city to the dead Athenians for whom he is speaking, "for the Athens that I have celebrated is only what the heroism of these and their like have made her ... none of these men allowed either wealth with its prospect of future enjoyment to unnerve his spirit, or poverty with its hope of a day of freedom and riches to tempt him to shrink from danger. No, holding that vengeance upon their enemies was more to be desired than any personal blessings, and reckoning this to be the most glorious of hazards, they joyfully determined to accept the risk. ... Thus, choosing to die resisting, rather than to live submitting, they fled only from dishonour." The conclusion seems inevitable: "Therefore, having judged that to be happy means to be free, and to be free means to be brave, do not shy away from the risks of war". With the linkage of Athens' greatness complete, Pericles moves to addressing his audience.

=== Praise for the military of Athens ===
In his speech, Pericles states that he had been emphasising the greatness of Athens in order to convey that the citizens of Athens must continue to support the war, to show them that the cause for which they were fighting was of the utmost importance. To help make his point, he stated that the soldiers of whom he was speaking gave their lives to a cause to protect the city of Athens, and its freedom. He praised Athens for its attributes that stood out amongst their neighbours, such as its democracy, when he elaborates that trust is justly placed on the citizens rather than relying only on the system and the policy of the city, where citizens boast a freedom that differs from their enemies', the Lacedaemonians. He regards the soldiers who gave their lives as truly worthy of merit; that if anyone should ask, they should look at their final moments when they gave their lives to their country and that should leave no doubt in the mind of the doubtful. He explained that fighting for one's country was a great honour, and that it was like wearing a cloak that concealed any negative implications because his imperfections would be outweighed by his merits as a citizen. He praises the soldiers for not faltering in their execution during the war; that the soldiers put aside their desires and wishes for the greater cause. Because as they are described by Pericles, Athenian citizens were distinct from the citizens of other nations – they were open-minded, tolerant, and ready to understand and follow orders. Where their system of democracy allowed them to have a voice amongst those who made important decisions that would affect them. Therefore, he proceeds to point out that the greatest honour and act of valour in Athens is to live and die for freedom of the state that Pericles believed was different and more special than any other neighbouring city.

=== Exhortation to the living (2.43–2.45) ===
Pericles then turns to the audience and exhorts them to live up to the standards set by the deceased: "So died these men as becomes Athenians. You, their survivors, must determine to have as unfaltering a resolution in the field, though you may pray that it may have a happier outcome."

Pericles addresses the widows of the dead only here, telling them that "the greatest glory for a woman is not to be spoken of at all, either for good or ill." This passage is often cited as characteristic of Athenian attitudes to women's role in public life, but is also connected to the standard behaviour of women as mourners at private funerals.

=== Epilogue (2.46) ===
Pericles ends with a short epilogue, reminding the audience of the difficulty of the task of speaking over the dead. The audience is then dismissed.

== Language and translations ==
Thucydides's Greek is notoriously difficult, but the language of "Pericles Funeral Oration" is considered by many to be the most difficult and virtuosic passage in the History of the Peloponnesian War. The speech is full of rhetorical devices, such as antithesis, anacoluthon, asyndeton, anastrophe, hyperbaton, and others; most famously the rapid succession of proparoxytone words beginning with e ("τὸ εὔδαιμον τὸ ἐλεύθερον, τὸ δ' ἐλεύθερον τὸ εὔψυχον κρίναντες" [judging courage freedom and freedom happiness]) at the climax of the speech (43.4). The style is deliberately elaborate, in accord with the stylistic preference associated with the sophists. There are several different English translations of the speech available.

Peter Aston wrote a choral version, So they gave their bodies, published in 1976.

== Comparison to the Gettysburg Address ==
The American Civil War scholars Louis Warren and Garry Wills have addressed the parallels of "Pericles's Funeral Oration" to Abraham Lincoln's famous Gettysburg Address. Lincoln's speech, like Pericles's:

- Begins with an acknowledgement of revered predecessors: "Four score and seven years ago, our fathers brought forth upon this continent ..."
- Praises the uniqueness of the State's commitment to democracy: "a new nation, conceived in liberty and dedicated to the proposition that all men are created equal ... government of the people, by the people, and for the people ..."
- Addresses the difficulties faced by a speaker on such an occasion: "we cannot dedicate, we cannot consecrate, we cannot hallow this ground"
- Exhorts the survivors to emulate the deeds of the dead: "It is for us the living, rather, to be dedicated here to the great task remaining before us"
- Contrasts the efficacy of words and deeds: "The brave men, living and dead, who struggled here, have consecrated it, far above our poor power to add or detract. ... The world will little note, nor long remember what we say here, but it can never forget what they did here."

It is uncertain to what degree, if any, Lincoln was directly influenced by Pericles's funeral oration. Wills never claims that Lincoln drew on it as a source, though Edward Everett, who delivered a lengthy oration at the same ceremony at Gettysburg, began by describing the "Athenian example".
