= Sergey Bolotin =

Russian mathematician (born 1954)

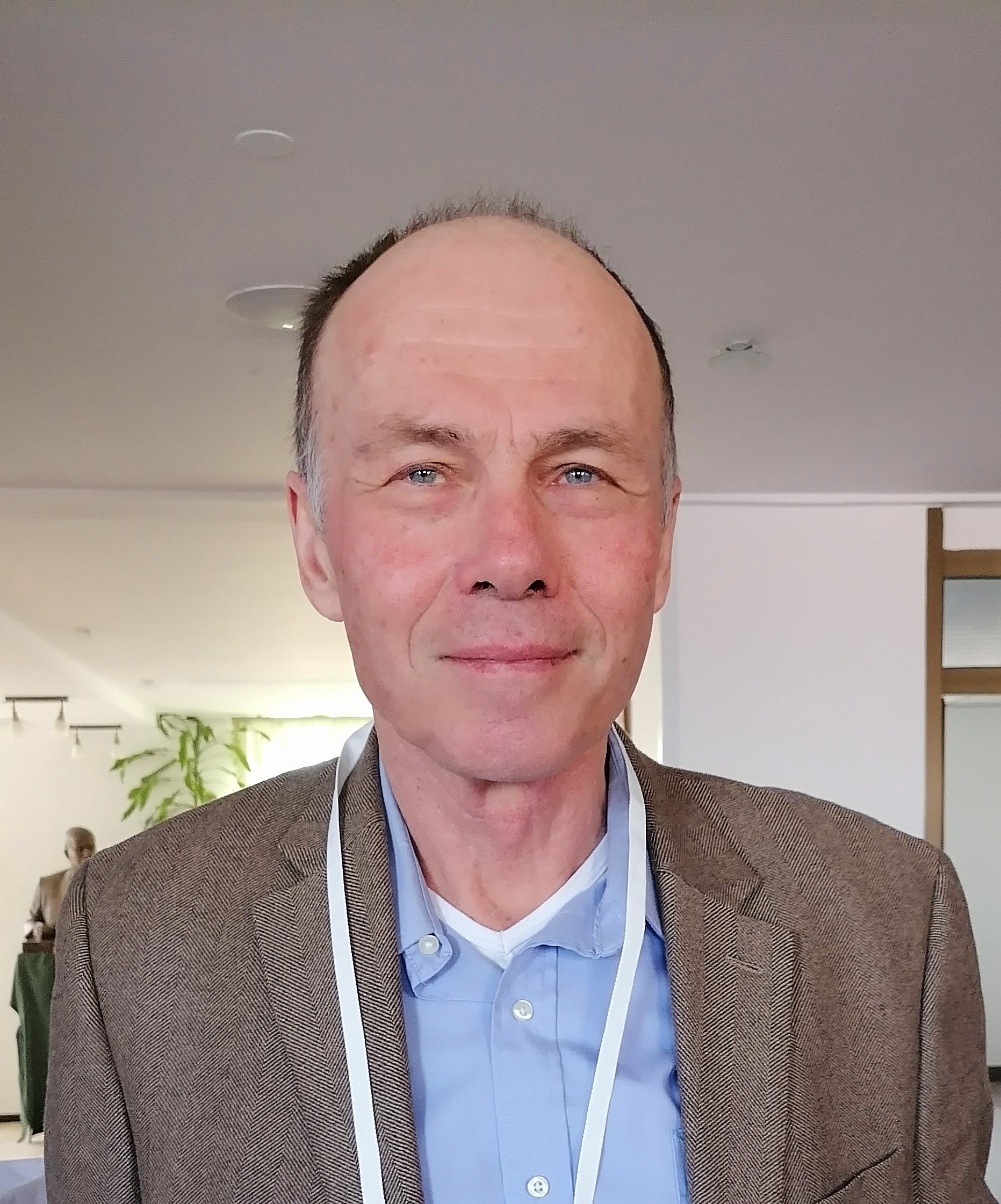

Sergey Vladimirovich Bolotin (Сергей Владимирович Болотин, born 1 December 1954 in Moscow) is a Russian mathematician, specializing in dynamical systems of classical mechanics.

== Biography ==
Bolotin graduated in 1976 from the Faculty of Mechanics and Mathematics of Moscow State University. There he received in 1981 his Candidate of Sciences degree (PhD) with thesis Либрационные движения обратимых механических систем (Librational motions of reversible mechanical systems). He received in 1998 his Russian Doctor of Sciences degree (habilitation) with thesis Двоякоасимптотические траектории и условия интегрируемости гамильтоновых систем (Double-asymptotic trajectories and integrability conditions for Hamiltonian systems).

Since 1998 Bolotin is a professor in the Department of Theoretical Mechanics, Faculty of Mechanics and Mathematics, Moscow State University. He is now the head of the Mechanics Department of the Steklov Institute of Mathematics. His research deals with dynamical systems of classical mechanics, Hamiltonian systems, and variational methods. He has supervised four PhD (Candidate of Sciences) students. He is the author or coauthor of over 75 scientific publications, including a textbook on theoretical mechanics (2010). He has served on the editorial board of the journal Regular and Chaotic Dynamics.

In 1994 he was an invited speaker with talk Invariant Sets of Hamiltonian Systems and Variational Methods at the International Congress of Mathematicians in Zurich. In 2016 he was elected a corresponding member of the Russian Academy of Sciences.

As a hobby, Bolotin sails in Olympic class Finn dinghies.

His brother Yuri Vladimirovich Bolotin (born December 1, 1954) is a professor at Moscow State University. Both brothers in 2020 became champions of Russia in the class of yachts "Carter 30".

== Selected publications ==
- Bolotin, S.V.; Kozlov, V.V. (1978). "Libration in systems with many degrees of freedom". Journal of Applied Mathematics and Mechanics. 42 (2): 256–261. doi:10.1016/0021-8928(78)90141-7.
- Bolotin, S. V. (1984). "First integrals of systems with gyroscopic forces". Moskovskii Universitet Vestnik Seriia Matematika Mekhanika: 75. Bibcode:1984MVSMM.......75B.
- Bolotin, S.V. (1984). "The effect of singularities of the potential energy on the integrability of mechanical systems". Journal of Applied Mathematics and Mechanics. 48 (3): 255–260. Bibcode:1984JApMM..48..255B. doi:10.1016/0021-8928(84)90128-X.
- Bolotin, S. V. (1988). "The Hill determinant of a periodic orbit". Moskovskii Universitet Vestnik Seriia Matematika Mekhanika: 30. Bibcode:1988MVSMM.......30B.
- Bolotin, S. V. (1992). "Integrable billiards on surfaces of constant curvature". Mathematical Notes. 51 (2): 117–123. doi:10.1007/BF02102114. S2CID 124726822.
- Bolotin, Sergey V. (1995). "Homoclinic orbits to invariant tori of Hamiltonian systems". Dynamical Systems in Classical Mechanics. Translations of the American Mathematical Society, Series 2. Vol. 168. pp. 21–90. ISBN 9780821804278.
- Bolotin, S.V.; Rabinowitz, P.H. (1998). "A Variational Construction of Chaotic Trajectories for a Reversible Hamiltonian System". Journal of Differential Equations. 148 (2): 364–387. Bibcode:1998JDE...148..364B. doi:10.1006/jdeq.1998.3470.
- Bolotin, S. V.; MacKay, R. S. (2000). "Periodic and Chaotic Trajectories of the Second Species for the n-Centre Problem". Celestial Mechanics and Dynamical Astronomy. 77 (1): 49–75. Bibcode:2000CeMDA..77...49B. doi:10.1023/A:1008393706818. S2CID 116941485.
- Bolotin, S. V.; Treschev, D. V. (2000). "Remarks on the definition of hyperbolic tori of Hamiltonian systems". Regular & Chaotic Dynamics. 5 (4): 401–412. doi:10.1070/rd2000v005n04ABEH000156 (inactive 12 July 2025). MR 1810623.
- Bolotin, Sergey V.; Treschev, Dmitrii V. (2010). "Hill's formula". Russian Mathematical Surveys. 65 (2): 191–257. arXiv:1006.1532. Bibcode:2010RuMaS..65..191B. doi:10.1070/RM2010v065n02ABEH004671. S2CID 119306867.
- Bolotin, S. V.; Kozlov, V. V. (2015). "Calculus of variations in the large, existence of trajectories in a domain with boundary, and Whitney's inverted pendulum problem". Izvestiya: Mathematics. 79 (5): 894–901. Bibcode:2015IzMat..79..894B. doi:10.1070/IM2015v079n05ABEH002765.
- Bolotin, S. V.; Treschev, D. V. (2015). "The anti-integrable limit". Russian Mathematical Surveys. 70 (6): 975–1030. Bibcode:2015RuMaS..70..975B. doi:10.1070/RM2015v070n06ABEH004972.
