= Vladimir Bolotin =

Russian physicist, scientist in solid mechanics (1926–2008)

- Born: March 29, 1926; Tambov
- Died: May 28, 2008
- Occupations: Physicist, mechanical engineer

Signature
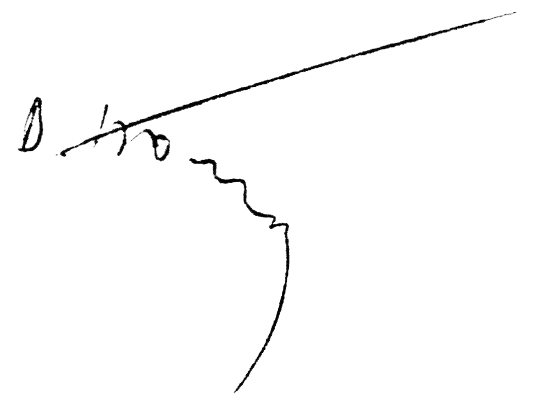

Vladimir Vasilyevich Bolotin (Russian: Владимир Васильевич Болотин; March 29, 1926 in Tambov – May 28, 2008 in Moscow) was a Soviet and Russian physicist in the field of solid mechanics, Doctor of Sciences, Distinguished Professor at the Moscow Power Engineering Institute, Academician of the Russian Academy of Sciences (since 1992), Academician of the Russian Academy of Architecture and Construction Sciences (since 1993), Honorary Member of the Russian Academy of Engineering, Foreign Member of the United States National Academy of Engineering (since 1996). Laureate of the 1985 USSR State Prize and of the 2000 State Prize of the Russian Federation.

He graduated from the Russian University of Transport in 1948. In 1950, he defended his Candidate's dissertation. In 1952, he defended his doctoral dissertation.

He started working at the Moscow Power Engineering Institute in 1953. From 1958 to 1996, Vladimir Bolotin headed the Department of Dynamics and Durability of Machines.

He was elected a corresponding member of the Academy of Sciences of the Soviet Union in 1974.

He was awarded the Order of Lenin. In 1999, he was awarded the Alfred M. Freudenthal Medal (American Society of Civil Engineers).

Bolotin is the author of over 350 published scientific papers, including 25 monographs.
