= Menexenus (dialogue) =

Socratic dialogue of Plato

The Menexenus (/məˈnɛksənəs/; Greek: Μενέξενος) is a Socratic dialogue of Plato, traditionally included in the seventh tetralogy along with the Greater and Lesser Hippias and the Ion. The speakers are Socrates and Menexenus, who is not to be confused with Socrates' son Menexenus. The Menexenus of Plato's dialogue appears also in the Lysis, where he is identified as the "son of Demophon", as well as the Phaedo.

The Menexenus consists mainly of a lengthy funeral oration, referencing the one given by Pericles in Thucydides' account of the Peloponnesian War. Socrates here delivers to Menexenus a speech that he claims to have learned from Aspasia, a consort of Pericles and prominent female Athenian philosopher.

Menexenus is unique among the Platonic dialogues in that the actual 'dialogue' serves primarily as exposition for the oration. For this reason, perhaps, the Menexenus has come under some suspicion of illegitimacy, although Aristotle's invocation of the text on multiple occasions seems to reinforce its authenticity. Much of the interest in the Menexenus stems from the fact that it is one of the few extant sources on the practice of Athenian funeral oratory, even though it parodies the medium.

== Synopsis ==
Socrates encounters Menexenus, who was coming from Athens' Council Chamber, and asks him what had transpired there. Menexenus replies that the Council was arranging for the burial of those fallen in battle and was about to select someone to make the funeral oration, but he is afraid that the orators are not well prepared (235c). Socrates asserts that a speech like this one should not be difficult to compose, and that even he could have done it, having been instructed in these matters by Aspasia herself, who according to Socrates, and probably with a sense of irony, has taught the best orator of them all, Pericles (235e). In fact, Socrates claims that Aspasia had prepared a whole speech which she had entrusted him with. In all probability, Socrates' claim is a literary device that Plato uses, as some of the events that will be mentioned in the speech happened after Aspasia's death. Menexenus is eager to listen but Socrates is reluctant at first, as he believes that Aspasia might become angry at him for publishing her speech. He finally consents and begins the delivery.

Like Pericles' Funeral Oration that her speech is supposed to be mimicking, Aspasia's oration is composed of a eulogy to the city of Athens. It begins by affirming the noble birth of the fallen together with their purity of blood. The speech also affirms the peculiar concept of autochthony (237b), by which Athenians never came from elsewhere but had “sprung from the very ground” of their city. The speech continues by recounting Athens' defence of Europe against the Persian Empire, first at Marathon and then at Salamis, proving to the rest of the Greeks that the Persians could be beaten. After displaying such bravery however, Athens became an object of envy, and so the city had to fight against her former allies (242a-b). As the Peloponnesian War broke out, Athens proved her character yet again at Sphacteria when it refused to kill the Spartan captives (242c).

Finally, the speech ends by claiming to deliver verbatim to the new generations the final words of those who had previously risked their lives for freedom (246d). They were: to live bravely, for neither money nor beauty is good without virtue, and to strive to exceed their forefathers, who would happily be "defeated" in this noble manner. The ancient saying "nothing overmuch" (μηδὲν ἄγαν) is wise indeed, and true character is shown by those who neither rejoice in excess when fortunate nor grieve too much in misfortune (248a). These were their ancestors' words.

Menexenus finds the speech to be marvellous and wonders ever more to the claim that it was composed by a woman. Yet, knowing Aspasia's quality, he is convinced (249e), and says that he will keep Socrates' secret of having shared her with him.

== Translations ==
- Plato, Appendix, Introduction, & English translation by Benjamin Jowett (~1892), – Project Gutenberg EBook (in English) — Same Menexenus – via Wikisource.
- Plato, Annotated English translation by Walter Rangeley Maitland Lamb, Plato in Twelve Volumes, Vol. 9 (1925), Cambridge, MA, Harvard University Press; London, William Heinemann Ltd. – Perseus Digital Library, Tufts University (in English)
- Plato, Computer Generated Audio Book(s) – English translation by Benjamin Jowett, – Internet Archive, Community Audio, mp3 (64kp/128kp/Ogg Vorbis) (in English)
- Plato, Ancient Greek, – Poesia Latina, Greco interattivo (in Ancient Greek)
- Schofield, Malcolm (edt); translations by Tom Griffith (2009). Plato: Gorgias, Menexenus, Protagoras (Cambridge Texts in the History of Political Thought). Cambridge University Press. p. 264. ISBN 978-0-521-83729-3.
