= Maxwell v. Dow =

- Supreme Court of the United States

Argued December 4, 1899 Decided February 26, 1900
- Full case name: Charles L. Maxwell v. George N. Dow
- Citations: 176 U.S. 581 (more) 20 S. Ct. 494; 20 S. Ct. 448; 44 L. Ed. 597

Court membership
- Chief Justice Melville Fuller Associate Justices John M. Harlan · Horace Gray; David J. Brewer · Henry B. Brown; George Shiras Jr. · Edward D. White; Rufus W. Peckham · Joseph McKenna

Case opinions
- Majority: Peckham, joined by Fuller, Gray, Brewer, Brown, Shiras, White, McKenna
- Dissent: Harlan

Maxwell v. Dow, 176 U.S. 581 (1900), is a United States Supreme Court decision which addressed two questions relating to the Due Process Clause: first, whether Utah's practice of allowing prosecutors to directly file criminal charges without a grand jury (this practice goes by the confusing name of information) was consistent with due process, and second, whether Utah's use of eight jurors instead of twelve in "courts of general jurisdiction" was constitutional.

== Background ==
The passage of the Fourteenth amendment expanded the application of the Bill of Rights to questions of state law with the Privileges or Immunities Clause which states "No State shall make or enforce any law which shall abridge the privileges or immunities of citizens of the United States", The landmark 1876 Slaughter-House Cases, set a narrow standard for the class of rights that clause may be applied to.

At the time of the case, the laws of Utah allowed criminal charges by grand jury or by "information", and provided for varying numbers of jurors depending on the court and charges involved.

Charles L. Maxwell was tried and convicted of robbery in Utah in 1898, and was eventually appealed to the Supreme Court, which heard the case in 1899. His suit argued that by denying him a twelve-member jury, and by avoiding the use of a grand jury, Utah's prosecution of him had violated his incorporated Due Process Clause rights.

== Opinion of the Court ==
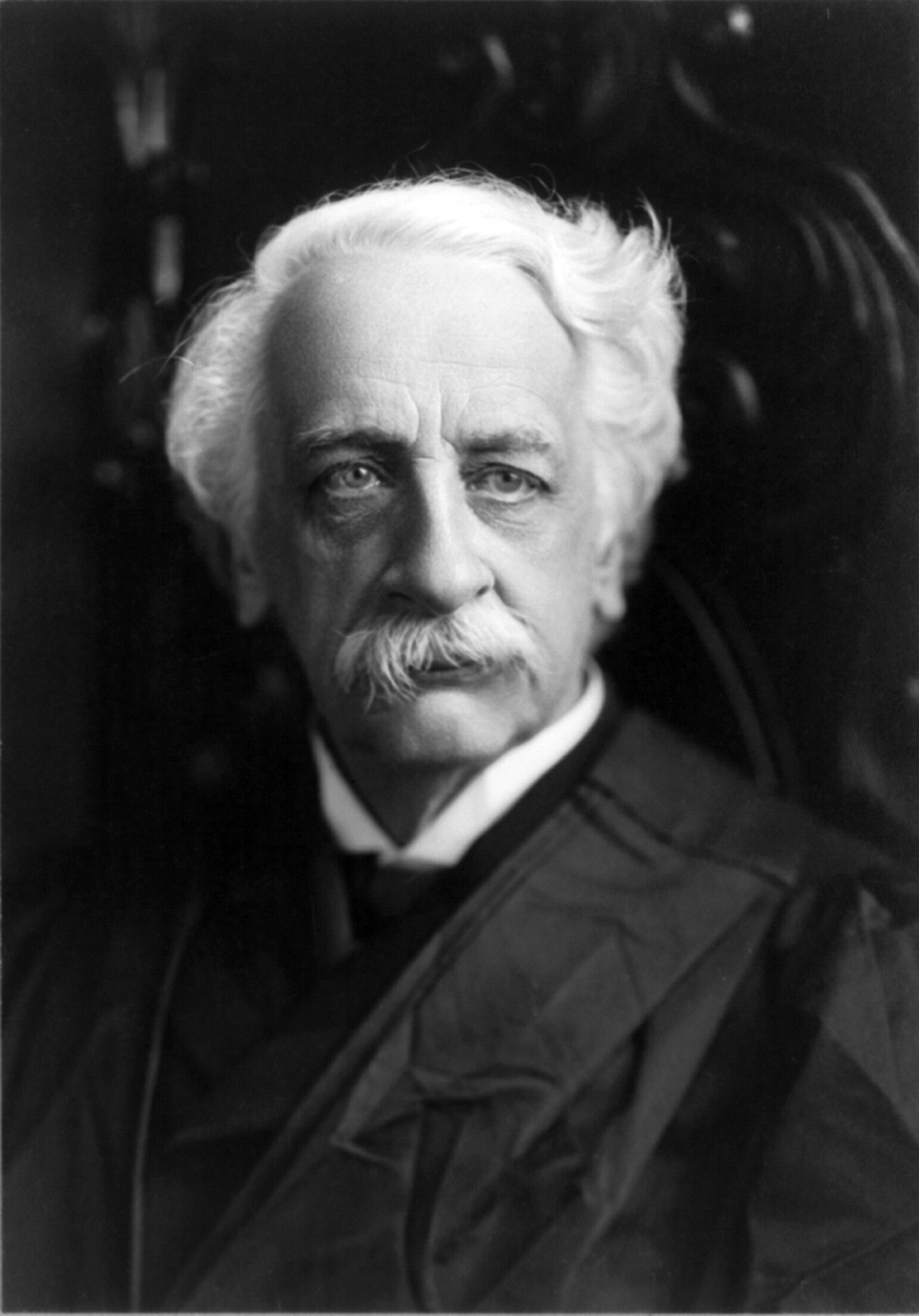
Justice Peckham delivered the opinion of the Court.

Associate Justice Rufus Wheeler Peckham, writing for the majority, held that Maxwell's rights under the Due Process Clause had not been violated. Much of the decision rested on the Slaugher-House Cases precedent.

Associate Justice John Marshall Harlan's lone dissent argued instead for the incorporation of the entirety of the first eight Amendments to the Constitution, a position he had been the first Supreme Court Justice to articulate in his lone dissent in Hurtado v. California (1884), and continued to argue in cases such as Twining v. New Jersey (1908).

== Subsequent developments ==
While the Court now incorporates a far greater portion of the Bill of Rights against the states, the specific narrow rights addressed in this case, specifically the right to a grand jury, and the right to a twelve-member jury in criminal cases remain unincorporated. In particular, with regard to jury size for state criminal prosecutions, Williams v. Florida (1970), for example, held that six jurors was sufficient; Ballew v. Georgia held that five were insufficient eight years later.

== See also ==
- List of United States Supreme Court cases, volume 176
