= United States v. Ortiz =

- Supreme Court of the United States

Argued February 18, 1975 Decided June 30, 1975
- Full case name: United States v. Ortiz
- Citations: 422 U.S. 891 (more) 95 S. Ct. 2585; 45 L. Ed. 2d 623
- Argument: Oral argument

Holding
- The Fourth Amendment forbids Border Patrol officers, in the absence of consent or probable cause, from searching private vehicles at traffic checkpoints removed from the border and other checkpoints that are equivalent in nature.

Court membership
- Chief Justice Warren E. Burger Associate Justices William O. Douglas · William J. Brennan Jr. Potter Stewart · Byron White; Thurgood Marshall · Harry Blackmun; Lewis F. Powell Jr. · William Rehnquist

Case opinions
- Majority: Powell, joined by Douglas, Brennan, Stewart, Marshall, Rehnquist
- Concurrence: Rehnquist
- Concurrence: Burger, joined by Blackmun
- Concurrence: White, joined by Blackmun

Laws applied
- U.S. Const. amend. 4

United States v. Ortiz, 422 U.S. 891 (1975), was a United States Supreme Court case in which the Court held that the Fourth Amendment prevented Border Patrol officers from conducting warrantless, suspicionless searches of private vehicles removed from the border or its functional equivalent.

== Background ==
On November 12, 1973, Ortiz was stopped in his car by Border Patrol officers on Interstate Highway 5 at San Clemente, California. The Border Patrol officers found three people concealed in the trunk of the car. These three people were found to be in the country illegally. After the search of the car at the checkpoint, Ortiz was convicted of transporting illegal aliens. Ortiz appealed the decision, and it was reversed by the Ninth Circuit Court. In their decision, the Ninth Circuit Court relied on a previous decision that was made in the case of Bowen v. United States, which stated that the requirement of probable cause for roving patrols that was outlined in the case of Almeida-Sanchez also extended to searches that were made at fixed checkpoints. This court case would then go to the supreme court.

== Government's Argument ==
In an argument before the Supreme Court, the Government, represented by Mark L. Evans and assisted by the Solicitor General Bork, argued that fixed checkpoints were "less intrusive than roving patrol searches and that the Border Patrol officials stationed at such checkpoints had less discretion in choosing which cars to search". Because of their less intrusive manner, the government contended that searches at fixed checkpoints fell within the fourth amendment's requirement of reasonableness, even though they did not have probable cause for the searches.

== Ortiz's Argument ==
In their argument challenging the constitutionality of these checkpoints on behalf of Ortiz, Mr. Charles M. Sevilla (the court-appointed attorney for Ortiz) argued that "in comparing a roving to a fixed check, we have to look at the nature of the intrusion involved and each case were involved with a search, which takes place because of the unfettered exercise of discretion by Border Patrol officer at a checkpoint who decides without any criteria... that he is going to select a car, refer to secondary and conduct a full search of a car". The attorney for Ortiz did not argue that checkpoints in general on the border were illegal, but that checkpoints that were located at a distance away from the border were in fact unconstitutional. The attorney for Ortiz also argued that a warrant should have been required for the search to take place, leaving the decision for probable cause up to a judicial officer, and not to a Border Patrol man. In his oral arguments, Sevilla stated "There was a warrant requirement because this is the concept where certainly a judicial officer should make the determination and not a Border Patrol man standing 66 miles north of a border determining a legal concept such as the functional equivalent of probable cause".

In summary, the attorney for Ortiz stated that because the checkpoint was 66 miles away from the border, the Border Patrol officers needed to have probable cause to search the vehicle along with a warrant.

== Court Opinion ==
This court case was a unanimous vote of 9–0 in favor of Ortiz. Associate Justice Lewis F. Powell, Jr. delivered the majority opinion of the court.

== Majority Opinion ==
In the majority opinion, Justice Powell stated that "nothing in this record suggests that the Border Patrol had any special reason to suspect that the respondent's car was carrying concealed aliens... The only question for decision is whether vehicle searches at traffic checkpoints... must be based on Probable Cause". In his opinion, Justice Powell makes reference to a prior case, Almeida-Sanchez v. United States that involved the constitutionality of vehicle searches conducted by roving patrols. Justice Powell states that, in the same way that these roving patrols must have probable cause for vehicle searches, traffic checkpoints must have probable cause to conduct vehicle searches as well. In the opinion, Justice Powell states that the "central concern of the Fourth Amendment is to protect liberty and privacy from arbitrary and oppressive interference by government officials". Justice Powell later goes on to say in his opinion, that the degree of discretion that is present in vehicle searches at checkpoints is not consistent with the fourth amendment, and that the Court has considered a search, even of an automobile, to be an invasion of privacy, and for that reason, the Court has always regarded probable cause as the minimum requirement for a lawful search. Overall, in the majority opinion, Justice Powell and the court ruled that at traffic checkpoints removed from the border and "its functional equivalents", officers may not search private vehicles without consent or probable cause.

== Concurring Opinions ==
=== Justice Rehnquist ===
In Justice Rehnquist's concurring opinion, he states that although he dissented in Almeida-Sanchez v. United States, he joined the opinion of the Court, because a majority of the Court still adhered to that ruling. Justice Rehnquist put emphasis on the fact that the Court's opinion is confined to full searches, and does not extend to fixed-checkpoint stops that asked about citizenship status.

=== Chief Justice Burger and Justice Blackmun ===
In their concurrence opinion, Chief Justice Burger and Justice Blackmun agreed with the Majority Opinion, but they wrote that they "hope that when we next deal with this problem we give greater weight to the reality that the Fourth Amendment prohibits only "unreasonable searches and seizures" and to the frequent admonition that reasonableness must take into account all the circumstances and balance the rights of the individual with the needs of society".
