= Judith Barringer =

Professor of greek art and archaeology

Judith Barringer is an American classical archaeologist and Professor of Greek Art and Archaeology at the University of Edinburgh. She studies the archaeology, art and culture of ancient Greece from the Archaic to Hellenistic periods.

== Career ==
Barringer received her BA from George Washington University, and her MA, MPhil and PhD from Yale University. She has held positions at Yale, the State University of New York, Vassar College, Trinity College, Bard College, and Middlebury College. She joined the University of Edinburgh in 2005, where she is currently holds the position of Professor of Greek Art and Archaeology.

Barringer was the 2007 Gertrude Smith Professor at the American School of Classical Studies at Athens. From 2011 to 2012, she was a senior fellow at the Internationales Forschungszentrum Kulturwissenschaften in Vienna, and in 2012 the RD Milns Visiting Professor at the University of Queensland. From 2013 to 2015 she held a Marie Curie Fellowship in Berlin. She serves on the editorial board of the Journal of Greek Archaeology.

Her 2014 book The Art and Archaeology of Ancient Greece won the 2016 PROSE Award for Textbook, Humanities, and has been described as an "outstanding book" and "authoritative and well written".

== Selected publications ==
- Barringer, J. 1995. Divine Escorts: Nereids in Archaic and Classical Greek Art. Ann Arbor.
- Barringer, J. 2001. The Hunt in Ancient Greece. The Johns Hopkins University Press.
- Barringer, J. 2008. Art, Myth, and Ritual in Classical Greece. Cambridge: Cambridge University Press.
- Barringer, J. 2014. The Art and Archaeology of Ancient Greece. Cambridge: Cambridge University Press.
- Barringer, J. 2021. Olympia: A Cultural History, Princeton and Oxford: Princeton University Press. ISBN 9780691210476.
