= David Bolotin =

American philosopher (born 1944)

- Born: 1944 (age 81–82)

Education
- Education: Cornell University (BA, 1966), New York University (PhD, 1974)

Philosophical work
- Era: 21st-century
- Region: Western philosophy
- Institutions: Yale University (Lecturer in Classics, 1971-73); St. John's College, Annapolis (Tutor, 1974-82); Santa Fe (1982-2012)
- Main interests: ancient Greek philosophy

David Bolotin (born 1944) is an American classical scholar and Tutor Emeritus at St. John's College in Santa Fe. He is known for his works on ancient Greek philosophy.

== Books ==
- Aristotle. On the Generation of Animals. Translated by David Bolotin. Macon, Ga.: Mercer University Press, 2026
- Aristotle. Parva Naturalia (with On the Motion of Animals). Translated by David Bolotin. Macon, Ga.: Mercer University Press, 2021
- Aristotle. De Anima (On Soul). Translated by David Bolotin. Macon, Ga.: Mercer University Press, 2018
- An Approach to Aristotle's Physics: With Particular Attention to the Role of His Manner of Writing, State University of New York Press 1998
- Plato's Dialogue on Friendship: An Interpretation of the "Lysis", with a New Translation, Cornell University Press 1979
