= Nicole Loraux =

French historian (1943–2003)

Nicole Loraux (French: [lɔʁo]; 26 April 1943 – 6 April 2003) was a French historian of classical Athens.

== Biography ==
Loraux was born in Paris and died in Argenteuil. She graduated in Classics at the École normale supérieure des filles (1962). In 1965, she obtained the agrégation de lettres classiques (examination equivalent to the Postgraduate Higher Education Teaching Certificate, but more competitive), before writing a PhD thesis under the supervision of Pierre Vidal-Naquet.

Her doctoral thesis Athènes imaginaire. Histoire de l'oraison funèbre athénienne et de sa fonction dans la cité classique (1977) became Loraux's best known work, The Invention of Athens: the Funeral Oration in the Classical City (Cambridge, MA 1986; New York 2006; orig. fr. Paris 1981).

Loraux was influential in the rise of gender as an important category of analysis in ancient Greek history. She has been described as a "preeminent" structuralist historian. In 2007, a conference was held in Paris to explore Loraux's legacy in feminist and classical scholarship. In 2018, a conference in Strasbourg entitled 'The Athenian Funeral Oration: 40 Years after Nicole Loraux' paid homage to the "huge impact" of Loraux's work on our understanding of the funeral oration's "central part in maintaining Athenian self-identity".

== Publications ==
- La Tragédie d’Athènes. La politique entre l’ombre et l’utopie, Seuil, 2005
- La Cité divisée. L’oubli dans la mémoire d’Athènes, Paris, Payot, coll. « Petite Bibliothèque Payot », 2005 ISBN 2-228-89961-5
- (dir.), (it) Grecia al femminile, Roma-Bari, Gius. Laterza & Figli, 1993; (fr) La Grèce au féminin, traduction française des articles en italien par Hélène Monsacré, Belles Lettres, coll. « Histoire », 2003 ISBN 2-251-38048-5
- avec Carles Miralles (dir.), Figures de l’intellectuel en Grèce ancienne, Belin, 2000
- La Voix endeuillée. Essai sur la tragédie grecque, Gallimard, 1999
- Né de la terre. Mythe et politique à Athènes, Paris, Seuil, coll. « La Librairie du xx^{e} siècle», 1996 ISBN 2-02-028240-2
- La Cité divisée. Critique de la politique, Payot, 1997
- L’Invention d’Athènes. Histoire de l’oraison funèbre dans la « cité classique », Paris/La Haye, éd. de l’EHESS/Mouton, 1981; nouvelle éd., nouvelle préface, Payot, 1993
- Qu’est-ce qu’une déesse dans Histoire des femmes en Occident I, Plon, 1991
- Les Enfants d’Athéna. Idées athéniennes sur la citoyenneté et la division des sexes, Paris, Maspero, 1981 ISBN 2-7071-1204-6; éd. augmentée d'une postface, Seuil, coll. « Points/Essais », 1990 ISBN 978-2-7578-0633-3
- Les Mères en deuil, Paris, Seuil, 1990
- Les Expériences de Tirésias. Le féminin et l’homme grec, Paris, Gallimard, NRF Essais, 1990
- Façons tragiques de tuer une femme, Paris, Hachette, 1985

=== English translations ===
- The invention of Athens: the funeral oration in the classical city, New York, Zone Books, 2006 ISBN 1890951587; Cambridge, M.A., Harvard University Press, 1986 ISBN 0674463625
- The divided city: on memory and forgetting in ancient Athens, New York, Zone Books, 2002 ISBN 1890951080
- The mourning voice: an essay on Greek tragedy, Ithaca, N.Y., Cornell University Press, 2002 ISBN 0801438306.
- Born of the earth: myth and politics in Athens, Ithaca, N.Y., Cornell University Press, 2000 ISBN 080143419X
- Mothers in mourning: with the essay, Of amnesty and its opposite, Ithaca, N.Y., Cornell University Press, 1998 ISBN 0801430909
- The experiences of Tiresias: the feminine and the Greek man, Princeton, N.J., Princeton University Press, 1995 ISBN 0691029857
- The children of Athena: Athenian ideas about citizenship and the division between the sexes, Princeton, N.J., Princeton University Press, 1993 ISBN 0691032726
- “What is a Goddess?” in A History of Women, Volume I: From Ancient Goddesses to Christian Saints, ed. Pauline Schmitt Pantel, Cambridge, M.A., Belknap Press of Harvard University Press, 1992, 11–44, orig. it. Roma-Bari 1990 ISBN 0674403703
- Tragic ways of killing a woman, Cambridge, M.A., Harvard University Press, 1987 ISBN 0674902254
