= List of United States Supreme Court cases involving constitutional criminal procedure =

The United States Constitution contains several provisions regarding criminal procedure, including: Article Three, along with Amendments Five, Six, Eight, and Fourteen. Such cases have come to comprise a substantial portion of the Supreme Court's docket.

== Article Three ==
=== Jury Clause ===
See #Jury Clauses

=== Venue Clause ===
- Ex parte Bollman, 8 U.S. (4 Cranch) 75, 135–37 (1807)
- United States v. Dawson, 56 U.S. (15 How.) 467, 487–88 (1853)
- United States v. Jackalow, 66 U.S. (1 Black) 484 (1861)
- Cook v. United States, 138 U.S. 157 (1891)
- Horner v. United States, 143 U.S. 207, 213–14 (1892)
- Dealy v. United States, 152 U.S. 539, 546–47 (1894)
- Burton v. United States, 196 U.S. 283 (1905)
- Hyde v. Shine, 199 U.S. 62, 76–78 (1905)
- Burton v. United States, 202 U.S. 344, 381–89 (1906)
- Armour Packing Co. v. United States, 209 U.S. 56, 76–77 (1908)
- United States v. Cores, 356 U.S. 405, 407 (1958)
- Travis v. United States, 364 U.S. 631, 634–35 (1961)
- United States v. Cabrales, 524 U.S. 1 (1998)
- Smith v. United States, 599 U.S. ___ (2023)

== Fifth Amendment ==
=== Grand Jury Clause ===
- Hurtado v. California, 110 U.S. 516 (1884)
- Ex parte Wilson, 114 U.S. 417 (1885)
- United States v. Petit, 114 U.S. 429 (1885)
- Mackin v. United States, 117 U.S. 348 (1886)
- Ex parte Bain, 121 U.S. 1 (1887), overruled in part by United States v. Cotton, 535 U.S. 625 (2002)
- Parkinson v. United States, 121 U.S. 281 (1887)
- McNulty v. California, 149 US 645, 648 (1893)
- Wong Wing v. United States, 163 U.S. 228 (1896)
- Maxwell v. Dow, 176 U.S. 581, 584–86 (1900)
- Lem Woon v. Oregon, 229 U.S. 586 (1913)
- United States v. Moreland, 258 U.S. 433 (1922)
- Costello v. United States, 350 U.S. 359 (1956)
- Lawn v. United States, 355 U.S. 339, 349 (1958)
- Green v. United States, 356 U.S. 165, 183–87 (1958)
- Stirone v. United States, 361 U.S. 212 (1960)
- Beck v. Washington, 369 U.S. 541, 545–55 (1962)
- United States v. Miller, 471 U.S. 130 (1985)
- Midland Asphalt Corp. v. United States, 489 U.S. 794, 802 (1989)
- United States v. Cotton, 535 U.S. 625 (2002)

=== Double Jeopardy Clause ===
- United States v. Perez, 22 U.S. (9 Wheat.) 579, 580 (1824)*
- United States v. Wilson, 32 U.S. (7 Pet.) 150, 159–60 (1833)*
- United States v. Randenbush, 33 U.S. (8 Pet.) 288, 290 (1834)*
- Fox v. Ohio, 46 U.S. (5 How.) 410 (1847)
- Moore v. Illinois, 55 U.S. (14 How.) 13 (1852)
- United States v. Nickerson, 58 U.S. (17 How.) 204 (1854)*
- Ex parte Lange, 85 U.S. (18 Wall.) 163 (1873)
- Ex parte Bigelow, 113 U.S. 328 (1885)
- Coffey v. United States, 116 U.S. 436 (1886), overruled by United States v. One Assortment of 89 Firearms, 465 U.S. 354 (1984)
- Ball v. United States, 163 U.S. 662 (1896)
- Burton v. United States, 202 U.S. 344, 378–81 (1906)
- Brantley v. Georgia, 217 U.S. 284 (1910) (per curiam), overruled by Price v. Georgia, 398 U.S. 323 (1970)
- United States v. La Franca, 282 U.S. 568 (1931)
- Blockburger v. United States, 284 U.S. 299 (1932)
- Palko v. Connecticut, 302 U.S. 319 (1937), overruled by Benton v. Maryland, 395 U.S. 784 (1969)
- Helvering v. Mitchell, 303 U.S. 391, 398–405 (1938)
- United States ex rel. Marcus v. Hess, 317 US 537, 548–52 (1943)
- Louisiana ex rel. Francis v. Resweber, 329 U.S. 459 (1947)
- Bryan v. United States, 338 U.S. 552 (1950), overruled by Burks v. United States, 437 U.S. 1 (1978)
- Sapir v. United States, 348 U.S. 373 (1955), overruled by Burks v. United States, 437 U.S. 1 (1978)
- Rex Trailer Co. v. United States, 350 U.S. 148 (1956)
- Yates v. United States, 354 U.S. 298 (1957), overruled by Burks v. United States, 437 U.S. 1 (1978)
- Green v. United States, 355 U.S. 184 (1957)
- Hoag v. New Jersey, 356 U.S. 464 (1958), overruled by Ashe v. Swenson, 397 U.S. 436 (1970)
- Bartkus v. Illinois, 359 U.S. 121 (1959)
- Forman v. United States, 361 U.S. 416 (1960), overruled by Burks v. United States, 437 U.S. 1 (1978)
- Fong Foo v. United States, 369 U.S. 141 (1962)
- United States v. Tateo, 377 U.S. 463 (1964)
- Baxstrom v. Herold, 383 U.S. 107 (1966)
- North Carolina v. Pearce, 395 U.S. 711 (1969)
- Benton v. Maryland, 395 U.S. 784 (1969)
- Waller v. Florida, 397 U.S. 387 (1970)
- Ashe v. Swenson, 397 U.S. 436 (1970)
- Price v. Georgia, 398 U.S. 323 (1970)
- Serfass v. United States, 420 U.S. 377 (1973)
- Wilson v. United States, 420 U.S. 332 (1975)
- United States v. Jenkins, 420 U.S. 358 (1975), overruled by United States v. Scott, 437 U.S. 82 (1978)
- United States v. Dinitz, 424 U.S. 600 (1976)
- Ludwig v. Massachusetts, 427 U.S. 600 (1976)
- United States v. Martin Linen Supply Co., 430 U.S. 564 (1977)
- Brown v. Ohio, 432 U.S. 161 (1977)
- Harris v. Oklahoma, 433 U.S. 682 (1977) (per curiam)
- Arizona v. Washington, 434 U.S. 497 (1978)
- Burks v. United States, 437 U.S. 1 (1978)
- Crist v. Bretz, 437 U.S. 28 (1978)
- Sanabria v. United States, 437 U.S. 54 (1978)
- United States v. Scott, 437 U.S. 82 (1978)
- Whalen v. United States, 445 U.S. 684 (1980)
- Oregon v. Kennedy, 456 U.S. 667 (1982)
- Tibbs v. Florida, 457 U.S. 31 (1982)
- Missouri v. Hunter, 459 U.S. 359 (1983)
- United States v. One Assortment of 89 Firearms, 465 U.S. 354 (1984)
- Justices of Boston Municipal Court v. Lydon, 466 U.S. 294 (1984)
- Garrett v. United States, 471 U.S. 773 (1985)
- Heath v. Alabama, 474 U.S. 82 (1985)
- Morris v. Mathews, 475 U.S. 237 (1986)
- United States v. Halper, 490 U.S. 435 (1989), overruled by Hudson v. United States, 522 U.S. 93 (1997)
- Grady v. Corbin, 495 U.S. 508 (1990), overruled by United States v. Dixon, 509 U.S. 688 (1993)
- United States v. Felix, 503 U.S. 378 (1992)
- United States v. Dixon, 509 U.S. 688 (1993)
- Department of Revenue of Montana v. Kurth Ranch, 511 U.S. 767 (1994)
- Rutledge v. United States, 517 U.S. 292 (1996)
- Hudson v. United States, 522 U.S. 93 (1997)
- United States v. Lara, 541 U.S. 193 (2004)
- Smith v. Massachusetts, 543 U.S. 462 (2005)
- Yeager v. United States, 557 U.S. 110 (2009)
- Renico v. Lett, 130 S. Ct. 1855 (2010)
- Blueford v. Arkansas, No. 10–1320 (May 24, 2012)

=== Self-Incrimination Clause ===
Concerning only incrimination that occurs in the courtroom

- Twining v. New Jersey, 211 U.S. 78 (1908)
- Griffin v. California, 380 U.S. 609 (1965)
- Miranda v. Arizona, 384 U.S. 436 (1966)
- Tehan v. United States ex rel. Shott, 382 U.S. 406 (1966)
- Williams v. Florida, 399 U.S. 78 (1970)
- Brooks v. Tennessee, 406 U.S. 605, 607–12 (1972)
- Lakeside v. Oregon, 435 U.S. 333 (1978)
- James v. Kentucky, 466 U.S. 341 (1984)
- Mitchell v. United States, 526 U.S. 314 (1999)

=== Due process ===
See #Criminal due process

== Sixth Amendment ==
=== Speedy Trial Clause ===
- Beavers v. Haubert, 198 U.S. 77, 86–91 (1905)
- United States v. Provoo, 350 U.S. 857 (1955) (per curiam), aff'g Petition of Provoo, 17 F.R.D. 183, 196–203 (D. Md. 1955)
- Pollard v. United States, 352 U.S. 354, 361 62 (1957)
- United States v. Ewell, 383 U.S. 116, 120–22 (1966)
- Klopfer v. North Carolina, 386 U.S. 213 (1967)
- Smith v. Hooey, 393 U.S. 374 (1969)
- Dickey v. Florida, 398 U.S. 30 (1970)
- United States v. Marion, 404 U.S. 307 (1971)
- Barker v. Wingo, 407 U.S. 514 (1972)
- Braden v. 30th Judicial Circuit Court of Kentucky, 410 U.S. 484 (1973)
- Strunk v. United States, 412 U.S. 434 (1973)
- United States v. Lovasco, 431 U.S. 783 (1977)
- United States v. MacDonald, 456 U.S. 1 (1982)
- United States v. Loud Hawk, 474 U.S. 302 (1986)
- Doggett v. United States, 505 U.S. 647 (1992)
- Vermont v. Brillon, 129 S. Ct. 1283 (2009)
- Omar Magatheh v. Noran Magatheh, 129 S. Ct. 1283 (2009)

=== Public Trial Clause ===
- Gaines v. Washington, 277 U.S. 81 84–86 (1928)
- In re Oliver, 333 U.S. 257, 266–73 (1948)
- Gannett Co., Inc. v. DePasquale, 443 U.S. 368, 379–91 (1979)
- Waller v. Georgia, 467 U.S. 39 (1984)
- Presley v. Georgia, 130 S. Ct. 721 (2010) (per curiam)

=== Jury Clauses ===
==== Availability of the jury ====
- Callan v. Wilson, 127 U.S. 540 (1888)
- Natal v. State, 139 U.S. 621 (1891)
- Schick v. United States, 195 U.S. 65 (1904)
- District of Columbia v. Colts, 282 U.S. 63 (1930)
- District of Columbia v. Clawans, 300 U.S. 617 (1937)
- United States v. Barnett, 376 U.S. 681 (1964)
- Cheff v. Schnackenberg, 384 U.S. 373 (1966)
- Duncan v. Louisiana, 391 U.S. 145 (1968)
- Bloom v. Illinois, 391 U.S. 194 (1968)
- DeStefano v. Woods, 392 U.S. 631 (1968) (per curiam)
- Frank v. United States, 395 U.S. 147 (1969)
- Baldwin v. New York, 399 U.S. 117 (1970)
- Mayberry v. Pennsylvania, 400 U.S. 455 (1971)
- Taylor v. Haynes, 418 U.S. 488 (1974)
- Codispoti v. Pennsylvania, 418 U.S. 506 (1974)
- Blanton v. North Las Vegas, 489 U.S. 538 (1989)
- United States v. Nachtigal, 507 U.S. 1 (1993)
- Lewis v. United States, 518 U.S. 322 (1996)

==== Impartiality ====
- Reynolds v. United States, 98 U.S. (8 Otto.) 145, 154–57 (1878)
- Connors v. United States, 158 U.S. 408, 411–16 (1895)
- Aldridge v. United States, 283 U.S. 308 (1931)
- Buchalter v. New York, 319 U.S. 427, 430 (1943)
- Dennis v. United States, 339 U.S. 162 (1950)
- Irvin v. Dowd, 366 U.S. 717 (1961)
- Beck v. Washington, 369 U.S. 541 (1962)
- Rideau v. Louisiana, 373 U.S. 723 (1963)
- Sheppard v. Maxwell, 384 U.S. 333 (1966)
- Witherspoon v. Illinois, 391 U.S. 510 (1968)
- Ham v. South Carolina, 409 U.S. 524 (1973)
- Murphy v. Florida, 421 U.S. 794 (1975)
- Ristaino v. Ross, 424 U.S. 589 (1976)
- Adams v. Texas, 448 U.S. 38 (1980)
- Rosales-Lopez v. United States, 451 U.S. 182 (1981)
- Patton v. Yount, 467 U.S. 1025 (1984)
- Wainwright v. Witt, 469 U.S. 412 (1985)
- Turner v. Murray, 476 U.S. 28 (1986)
- Lockhart v. McCree, 476 U.S. 162 (1986)
- Gray v. Mississippi, 481 U.S. 648 (1987)
- Ross v. Oklahoma, 487 U.S. 81 (1988)
- Mu'Min v. Virginia, 500 U.S. 415 (1991)
- Morgan v. Illinois, 504 U.S. 719 (1992)
- United States v. Martinez-Salazar, 528 U.S. 304 (2000)
- Skilling v. United States, 130 S. Ct. 2896, 2912–25 (2010)

==== Facts found ====
- McMillan v. Pennsylvania, 477 U.S. 79 (1986)
- Walton v. Arizona, 497 U.S. 639 (1990), overruled by Ring v. Arizona, 536 U.S. 584 (2002)
- Almendarez-Torres v. United States, 523 U.S. 224 (1998)
- Jones v. United States, 526 U.S. 227 (1999)
- Apprendi v. New Jersey, 530 U.S. 466 (2000)
- Harris v. United States, 536 U.S. 545 (2002)
- Ring v. Arizona, 536 U.S. 584 (2002)
- Blakely v. Washington, 542 U.S. 296 (2004)
- Schriro v. Summerlin, 542 U.S. 348 (2004)
- United States v. Booker, 543 U.S. 220 (2005)
- Washington v. Recuenco, 548 U.S. 212 (2006)
- Cunningham v. California, 549 U.S. 270 (2007)
- Oregon v. Ice, 555 U.S. 160 (2009)
- Southern Union Co. v. United States, No 11-94 (U.S. June 21, 2012)
- McKinney v. Arizona 589 U.S. ___ (2020)

==== Size and unanimity ====
- Thompson v. Utah, 170 U.S. 343 (1898), overruled by Williams v. Florida, 399 U.S. 78 (1970)
- Maxwell v. Dow, 176 U.S. 581, 586–605 (1900), overruled in part by Williams v. Florida, 399 U.S. 78 (1970)
- Rassmussen v. United States, 197 U.S. 516 (1905), overruled by Williams v. Florida, 399 U.S. 78 (1970)
- Patton v. United States, 281 U.S. 276 (1930), overruled by Williams v. Florida, 399 U.S. 78 (1970)
- Williams v. Florida, 399 U.S. 78 (1970)
- Apodaca v. Oregon, 406 U.S. 404 (1972)
- Ballew v. Georgia, 435 U.S. 223 (1978)
- Burch v. Louisiana, 441 U.S. 130 (1979)

==== Vicinage ====
- United States v. Dawson, 56 U.S. (15 How.) 467, 487 (1853)
- Jones v. United States, 137 U.S. 202, 211 (1890)
- Cook v. United States, 138 U.S. 157, 181 (1891)
- Burton v. United States, 196 U.S. 283 (1905)
- Burton v. United States, 202 U.S. 344, 381–89 (1906)
- Ruthenberg v. United States, 245 U.S. 480, 482 (1918)
- Lewis v. United States, 279 U.S. 63, 72–73 (1929)
- United States v. Cabrales, 524 U.S. 1 (1998)

=== Information Clause ===
- United States v. Gooding, 25 U.S. (12 Wheat.) 460, 473–75 (1827)*
- United States v. Mills, 32 U.S. (7 Pet.) 138 (1833)*
- Twitchell v. Pennsylvania, 74 U.S. (7 Wall.) 321 (1868)
- Cole v. Arkansas, 333 U.S. 196 (1948)
- Russell v. United States, 369 U.S. 749 (1962)

=== Confrontation Clause ===
==== Out-of-court statements ====
- Reynolds v. United States, 98 U.S. (8 Otto.) 145, 158–61 (1878)
- Mattox v. United States, 156 U.S. 237, 240–44 (1895)
- Kirby v. United States, 174 U.S. 47 (1899)
- Motes v. United States, 178 U.S. 458 (1900)
- Dowdell v. United States, 221 U.S. 325 (1911)
- Pointer v. Texas, 380 U.S. 400 (1965)
- Brookhart v. Janis, 384 U.S. 1 (1966)
- Barber v. Page, 390 U.S. 719 (1968)
- Bruton v. United States, 391 U.S. 123 (1968)
- Berger v. California, 393 U.S. 314 (1969)
- Frazier v. Cupp, 394 U.S. 731, 733–37 (1969)
- California v. Green, 399 U.S. 149 (1970)
- Dutton v. Evans, 400 U.S. 74 (1970)
- Mancusi v. Stubbs, 408 U.S. 204 (1972)
- Ohio v. Roberts, 448 U.S. 56 (1980), overruled by Crawford v. Washington, 541 U.S. 36 (2004)
- Tennessee v. Street, 471 U.S. 409 (1985)
- Delaware v. Fensterer, 474 U.S. 15, 18–19 (1985) (per curiam)
- United States v. Inadi, 475 U.S. 387 (1986)
- Lee v. Illinois, 476 U.S. 530 (1986)
- Crawford v. Washington, 541 U.S. 36 (2004)
- Davis v. Washington, 547 U.S. 813 (2006)
- Whorton v. Bockting, 549 U.S. 406 (2007)
- Giles v. California, 554 U.S. 353 (2008)
- Melendez-Diaz v. Massachusetts, 557 U.S. 305 (2009)
- Michigan v. Bryant, 131 S. Ct. 1143 (2011)
- Bullcoming v. New Mexico, 131 S. Ct. 2705 (2011)
- Williams v. Illinois, No. 10–8505 (June 18, 2012)

==== Face-to-face confrontation ====
- Snyder v. Massachusetts, 291 U.S. 97 (1934)
- Kentucky v. Stincer, 482 U.S. 730 (1987)
- Coy v. Iowa, 487 U.S. 1012 (1988)
- Maryland v. Craig, 497 U.S. 836 (1990)

==== Restrictions on cross-examination ====
- Douglas v. Alabama, 380 U.S. 415 (1965)
- McCray v. Illinois, 386 U.S. 300, 314 (1967)
- Smith v. Illinois, 390 U.S. 129 (1968)
- Chambers v. Mississippi, 410 U.S. 284 (1973)
- Davis v. Alaska, 415 U.S. 308 (1974)
- Delaware v. Fensterer, 474 U.S. 15, 19–23 (1985) (per curiam)
- Delaware v. Van Arsdall, 475 U.S. 673 (1986)

==== Right to present relevant evidence ====
- McCray v. Illinois, 386 U.S. 300, 313–14 (1967)
- Pennsylvania v. Ritchie, 480 U.S. 39, 51–54 (1987)
- Olden v. Kentucky, 488 U.S. 227 (1988) (per curiam)
- Michigan v. Lucas, 500 U.S. 145 (1991)

=== Compulsory Process Clause ===
- United States v. Van Duzee, 140 U.S. 169, 172–73 (1891)
- Blackmer v. United States, 284 U.S. 421, 442 (1932)
- Pate v. Robinson, 383 U.S. 375, 378 n.1 (1966)
- Washington v. Texas, 388 U.S. 14 (1967)
- United States v. Valenzuela-Bernal, 458 U.S. 858 (1982)
- Pennsylvania v. Ritchie, 480 U.S. 39, 55–58 (1987)
- Rock v. Arkansas, 483 U.S. 44 (1987)
- Taylor v. Illinois, 484 U.S. 400 (1988)

=== Assistance of Counsel Clause ===
==== Choice of counsel ====
- Chandler v. Fretag, 348 U.S. 3 (1954)
- Morris v. Slappy, 461 U.S. 1 (1983)
- Wheat v. United States, 486 U.S. 153 (1988)
- Caplin & Drysdale, Chartered v. United States, 491 U.S. 617 (1989)
- United States v. Gonzalez-Lopez, 548 U.S. 140 (2006)

==== Appointment of counsel ====
- Powell v. Alabama, 287 U.S. 45 (1932)
- Johnson v. Zerbst, 304 U.S. 458 (1938)
- Walker v. Johnston, 312 U.S. 275, 286–87 (1941)
- Holiday v. Johnston, 313 U.S. 342 (1941)
- Betts v. Brady, 316 U.S. 455 (1942), overruled by Gideon v. Wainwright, 372 U.S. 335 (1963)
- Hamilton v. Alabama, 368 U.S. 52 (1961)
- Gideon v. Wainwright, 372 U.S. 335 (1963)
- Douglas v. California, 372 U.S. 353 (1963)
- Anders v. California, 386 U.S. 738 (1967)
- Argersinger v. Hamlin, 407 U.S. 25 (1972)
- Gagnon v. Scarpelli, 411 U.S. 778 (1973)
- Ross v. Moffitt, 417 U.S. 600 (1974)
- Scott v. Illinois, 440 U.S. 367 (1979)
- Baldasar v. Illinois, 446 U.S. 222 (1980), overruled by Nichols v. United States, 511 U.S. 738 (1994)
- Pennsylvania v. Finley, 481 U.S. 551 (1987)
- McCoy v. Court of Appeals of Wisconsin, 486 U.S. 429 (1988)
- Penson v. Ohio, 488 U.S. 75 (1988)
- Murray v. Giarratano, 492 U.S. 1 (1989)
- Coleman v. Thompson, 501 U.S. 722 (1991)
- Nichols v. United States, 511 U.S. 738 (1994)
- Smith v. Robbins, 528 U.S. 259 (2000)
- Alabama v. Shelton, 535 U.S. 654 (2002)

==== Constructive denial ====
- Avery v. Alabama, 308 U.S. 444 (1940)
- Ferguson v. Georgia, 365 U.S. 570 (1961)
- Brooks v. Tennessee, 406 U.S. 605, 612–13 (1972)
- Herring v. New York, 422 U.S. 853 (1975)
- Geders v. United States, 425 U.S. 80 (1976)
- Weatherford v. Bursey, 429 U.S. 545 (1977)
- United States v. Morrison, 449 U.S. 361 (1981)
- Perry v. Leeke, 488 U.S. 272 (1989)

==== Critical stages ====
- Reece v. Georgia, 350 U.S. 85 (1955)
- Hamilton v. Alabama, 368 U.S. 52 (1961)
- United States v. Wade, 388 U.S. 218 (1967)
- Gilbert v. California, 388 U.S. 263, 267, 269–74 (1967)
- Coleman v. Alabama, 399 U.S. 1 (1970)
- United States v. Ash, 413 U.S. 300 (1973)

==== Conflict-free counsel ====
- Glasser v. United States, 315 U.S. 60, 68–77 (1942)
- Dukes v. Warden, 406 U.S. 250 (1972)
- Holloway v. Arkansas, 435 U.S. 475 (1978)
- Cuyler v. Sullivan, 446 U.S. 335, 345–50 (1980)
- Burger v. Kemp, 483 U.S. 776 (1987)
- Mickens v. Taylor, 535 U.S. 162 (2002)

==== Ineffective assistance of counsel ====
- McMann v. Richardson, 397 U.S. 759 (1970)
- United States v. Cronic, 466 U.S. 648 (1984)
- Strickland v. Washington, 466 U.S. 668 (1984)
- Evitts v. Lucey, 469 U.S. 387 (1985)
- Hill v. Lockhart, 474 U.S. 52 (1985)
- Nix v. Whiteside, 475 U.S. 157 (1986)
- Kimmelman v. Morrison, 477 U.S. 365 (1986)
- Lockhart v. Fretwell, 506 U.S. 364 (1993)
- Smith v. Robbins, 528 U.S. 259 (2000)
- Roe v. Flores-Ortega, 528 U.S. 470 (2000)
- Williams v. Taylor, 529 U.S. 362 (2000)
- Glover v. United States, 531 U.S. 198 (2001)
- Bell v. Cone, 535 U.S. 685 (2002) (per curiam)
- Woodford v. Visciotti, 537 U.S. 19 (2002) (per curiam)
- Wiggins v. Smith, 539 U.S. 510 (2003)
- Holland v. Jackson, 542 U.S. 649 (2004) (per curiam)
- Florida v. Nixon, 543 U.S. 175 (2004)
- Rompilla v. Beard, 545 U.S. 374 (2005)
- Schriro v. Landrigan, 550 U.S. 465 (2007)
- Wright v. Van Patten, 552 U.S. 120 (2008) (per curiam)
- Knowles v. Mirzayance, 556 U.S. 111 (2009)
- Bobby v. Van Hook, 130 S. Ct. 13 (2009) (per curiam)
- Wong v. Belmontes, 130 S. Ct. 383 (2009) (per curiam)
- Porter v. McCollum, 130 S. Ct. 447 (2009) (per curiam)
- Wood v. Allen, 130 S. Ct. 841 (2010)
- Padilla v. Kentucky, 130 S. Ct. 1473 (2010)
- Sears v. Upton, 130 S. Ct. 3259 (2010) (per curiam)
- Premo v. Moore, 131 S. Ct. 733 (2011)
- Harrington v. Richter, 131 S. Ct. 770 (2011)
- Cullen v. Pinholster, 131 S. Ct. 1388 (2011)
- Lafler v. Cooper, 132 S. Ct. 1376 (2012)
- Missouri v. Frye, 132 S. Ct. 1399 (2012)

==== Pro se representation ====
- Faretta v. California, 422 U.S. 806 (1975)
- McKaskle v. Wiggins, 465 U.S. 168 (1984)
- Rock v. Arkansas, 483 U.S. 44 (1987)
- Martinez v. California Court of Appeals, 528 U.S. 152 (2000)
- Indiana v. Edwards, 554 U.S. 164 (2008)

== Eighth Amendment's Excessive Bail Clause ==
- Stack v. Boyle, 342 U.S. 1 (1951)
- Schilb v. Kuebel, 404 U.S. 357 (1971)
- Murphy v. Hunt, 455 U.S. 478 (1982)
- United States v. Salerno, 481 U.S. 739 (1987)

== Fourteenth Amendment ==
=== Criminal due process ===
Also the Fifth Amendment

- Minder v. Georgia, 183 U.S. 559 (1902)
- Frank v. Mangum, 237 U.S. 309, 345 (1915)
- Moore v. Dempsey, 261 U.S. 86 (1923)
- Tumey v. Ohio, 273 U.S. 510 (1927)
- Manley v. Georgia, 279 U.S. 1 (1929)
- Buchalter v. New York, 319 U.S. 427, 430–31 (1943)

==== Proof beyond a reasonable doubt ====
- Coffin v. United States, 156 U.S. 432 (1895)*
- Leland v. Oregon, 343 U.S. 790 (1952)
- Holland v. United States, 348 U.S. 121 (1954)
- Leary v. United States, 395 U.S. 6, 29–54 (1959)
- In re Winship, 397 U.S. 358 (1970)
- Cool v. United States, 409 U.S. 100 (1972) (per curiam)
- Mullaney v. Wilbur, 421 U.S. 684 (1975)
- Patterson v. New York, 432 U.S. 197 (1977)
- Hankerson v. North Carolina, 432 U.S. 233 (1977)
- Taylor v. Kentucky, 436 U.S. 478 (1978)
- County Court of Ulster Cty. v. Allen, 442 U.S. 140 (1979)
- Sandstrom v. Montana, 442 U.S. 510 (1979)
- Jackson v. Virginia, 443 U.S. 307 (1979)
- Murray v. Carrier, 477 U.S. 478 (1986)
- Cage v. Louisiana, 498 U.S. 39 (1990) (per curiam)
- Sullivan v. Louisiana, 508 U.S. 275 (1993)
- Victor v. Nebraska, 511 U.S. 1, 22 (1994)
- Schlup v. Delo, 513 U.S. 298 (1995)

==== Use of false evidence ====
- Mooney v. Holohan, 294 U.S. 103 (1935) (per curiam)
- Hysler v. Florida, 315 U.S. 411 (1942)
- Pyle v. Kansas, 317 U.S. 213 (1942)
- New York ex rel. Whitman v. Wilson, 318 U.S. 688 (1943) (per curiam)
- McDonough v. Smith, 139 S. Ct. 915 (2019)

==== Certain expenses for indigent defendants ====
- Griffin v. Illinois, 351 U.S. 12 (1956)
- Burns v. Ohio, 360 U.S. 252 (1959)
- Britt v. North Carolina, 404 U.S. 226 (1971)
- Ake v. Oklahoma, 470 U.S. 68 (1985)

==== Mental competence ====
- Bishop v. United States, 350 U.S. 961 (1956) (per curiam)
- Dusky v. United States, 362 U.S. 402 (1960) (per curiam)
- Pate v. Robinson, 383 U.S. 375 (1966)
- Drope v. Missouri, 420 U.S. 162 (1975)
- Riggins v. Nevada, 504 U.S. 127 (1992)
- Medina v. California, 505 U.S. 437 (1992)
- Godinez v. Moran, 509 U.S. 389 (1993)
- Cooper v. Oklahoma, 517 U.S. 348 (1996)
- Sell v. United States, 539 U.S. 166 (2003)
- Indiana v. Edwards, 554 U.S. 164 (2008)

==== Disclosure of exculpatory and impeachment material ====
- Brady v. Maryland, 373 U.S. 83 (1963)
- Giglio v. United States, 405 U.S. 150 (1972)
- Moore v. Illinois, 408 U.S. 786 (1972)
- United States v. Agurs, 427 U.S. 97 (1976)
- California v. Trombetta, 467 U.S. 479 (1984)
- United States v. Bagley, 473 U.S. 667 (1985)
- Arizona v. Youngblood, 488 U.S. 51 (1988)
- Kyles v. Whitley, 514 U.S. 419 (1995)
- Wood v. Bartholomew, 516 U.S. 1 (1995) (per curiam)
- Strickler v. Greene, 527 U.S. 263 (1999)
- Williams v. Taylor, 529 U.S. 420 (2000)
- United States v. Ruiz, 536 U.S. 622 (2002)
- Illinois v. Fisher, 540 U.S. 544 (2004) (per curiam)
- Banks v. Dretke, 540 U.S. 668 (2004)
- Youngblood v. West Virginia, 547 U.S. 867 (2006) (per curiam)
- Cone v. Bell, 556 U.S. 449 (2009)
- Smith v. Cain, 132 S. Ct. 627 (2012)

==== Right to present a defense ====
- Rock v. Arkansas, 483 U.S. 44 (1987)

=== Equal protection and criminal procedure ===
==== Selective prosecution ====
- McCleskey v. Kemp, 481 U.S. 279 (1987)
- United States v. Armstrong, 517 U.S. 456 (1996)

==== Racial discrimination in the jury pool and venire ====
- Strauder v. West Virginia, 100 U.S. 303 (1880)
- Virginia v. Rives, 100 U.S. 313 (1880)
- Neal v. Delaware, 103 U.S. 370 (1881)
- Gibson v. Mississippi, 162 U.S. 565 (1896)
- Smith v. Mississippi, 162 U.S. 592 (1896)
- Carter v. Texas, 177 U.S. 442 (1900)
- Tarrance v. Florida, 188 U.S. 519 (1903)
- Brownfield v. South Carolina, 189 U.S. 426 (1903)
- Rogers v. Alabama, 192 U.S. 226 (1904)
- Franklin v. South Carolina, 218 U.S. 161, 165–68 (1910)
- Norris v. Alabama, 294 U.S. 587 (1935)
- Patterson v. Alabama, 294 U.S. 600 (1935)
- Hale v. Kentucky, 303 U.S. 613 (1938) (per curiam)
- Smith v. Texas, 311 U.S. 128 (1940)
- Hill v. Texas, 316 U.S. 400 (1942)
- Patton v. Mississippi, 332 U.S. 463 (1947)
- Cassell v. Texas, 339 U.S. 282 (1950)
- Brown v. Allen, 344 U.S. 443 (1953)
- Avery v. Georgia, 345 U.S. 559 (1953)
- Hernandez v. Texas, 347 U.S. 475 (1954)
- Williams v. Georgia, 349 U.S. 375 (1955)
- Reece v. Georgia, 350 U.S. 85 (1955)
- Michel v. Louisiana, 350 U.S. 91 (1955)
- Eubanks v. Louisiana, 356 U.S. 584 (1958)
- Coleman v. Alabama, 389 U.S. 22 (1967)
- Parker v. North Carolina, 397 U.S. 790, 798–99 (1970)
- Davis v. United States, 411 U.S. 233 (1973)
- Tollett v. Henderson, 411 U.S. 258 (1973)
- Francis v. Henderson, 425 U.S. 536 (1976)
- Rose v. Mitchell, 443 U.S. 545 (1979)
- Vasquez v. Hillery, 474 U.S. 254 (1986)
- Amadeo v. Zant, 486 U.S. 214 (1988)

==== Fair cross-section of the community ====
- Kentucky v. Powers, 201 U.S. 1 (1906)
- Glasser v. United States, 315 U.S. 60, 83–87 (1942)
- Thiel v. Southern Pacific Co., 328 U.S. 217 (1946)
- Ballard v. United States, 329 U.S. 187 (1946)
- Taylor v. Louisiana, 419 U.S. 522 (1975)
- Duren v. Missouri, 439 U.S. 357 (1979)
- Holland v. Illinois, 493 U.S. 474 (1990)
- Berghuis v. Smith, 130 S. Ct. 1382 (2010)

==== Discriminatory peremptory challenges ====
- Batson v. Kentucky, 476 U.S. 79 (1986)
- Griffith v. Kentucky, 479 U.S. 314 (1987)
- Teague v. Lane, 489 U.S. 288 (1989)
- Ford v. Georgia, 498 U.S. 411 (1991)
- Powers v. Ohio, 499 U.S. 400 (1991)
- Hernandez v. New York, 500 U.S. 352 (1991)
- Trevino v. Texas, 503 U.S. 562 (1992) (per curiam)
- Georgia v. McCollum, 505 U.S. 42 (1992)
- J.E.B. v. Alabama ex rel. T.B., 511 U.S. 127 (1994)
- Purkett v. Elem, 514 U.S. 765 (1995) (per curiam)
- Miller-El v. Cockrell (Miller-El I), 537 U.S. 322 (2003)
- Johnson v. California, 543 U.S. 499 (2005)
- Miller-El v. Dretke (Miller-El II), 545 U.S. 231 (2005)
- Rice v. Collins, 546 U.S. 333 (2006)
- Snyder v. Louisiana, 552 U.S. 472 (2008)
- Rivera v. Illinois, 556 U.S. 148 (2009)
- Thaler v. Haynes, 130 S. Ct. 1171 (2010) (per curiam)
- Felkner v. Jackson, 131 S. Ct. 1305 (2011) (per curiam)
- Flowers v. Mississippi, 139 S. Ct. 451 (2018)
