= Hamilton v. Alabama =

Hamilton v. Alabama may refer to:

- Hamilton v. Alabama (1961), 368 U.S. 52, on the right of the accused to have legal representation
- Hamilton v. Alabama (1964), 376 U.S. 650, on racial discrimination
