= Assistance of Counsel Clause =

American constitutional right

The Assistance of Counsel Clause of the Sixth Amendment to the United States Constitution provides: "In all criminal prosecutions, the accused shall enjoy the right...to have the Assistance of Counsel for his defence."

The assistance of counsel clause includes five distinct rights: the right to counsel of choice, the right to appointed counsel, the right to conflict-free counsel, the effective assistance of counsel, and the right to represent oneself pro se.

== Attachment at critical stages ==
As stated in Brewer v. Williams, 430 U.S. 387 (1977), the right to counsel "means at least that a person is entitled to the help of a lawyer at or after the time that judicial proceedings have been initiated against him, 'whether by way of formal charge, preliminary hearing, indictment, information, or arraignment.'" Brewer goes on to conclude that once adversarial proceedings have begun against a defendant, he has a right to legal representation when the government interrogates him and that when a defendant is arrested, "arraigned on [an arrest] warrant before a judge," and "committed by the court to confinement," "[t]here can be no doubt that judicial proceedings ha[ve] been initiated."

Individuals subject to grand jury proceedings do not have a Sixth Amendment right to counsel because grand juries are not considered by the U.S. Supreme Court to be criminal proceedings which trigger the protections of that constitutional protection.

== Choice of counsel ==
Subject to considerations such as conflicts of interest, scheduling, counsel's authorization to practice law in the jurisdiction, and counsel's willingness to represent the defendant (whether pro bono or for a fee), criminal defendants have a right to be represented by counsel of their choice. The remedy for erroneous deprivation of first choice counsel is automatic reversal.

== Conflict free counsel ==
Whether counsel is retained or appointed, the defendant has a right to counsel without a conflict of interest. If an actual conflict of interest is present, and that conflict results in any adverse effect on the representation, the result is automatic reversal. The general rule is that conflicts can be knowingly and intelligently waived, but some conflicts are un-waiveable.

== Appointment of counsel ==
In Powell v. Alabama, the Supreme Court ruled that "in a capital case, where the defendant is unable to employ counsel, and is incapable adequately of making his own defense because of ignorance, feeble mindedness, illiteracy, or the like, it is the duty of the court, whether requested or not, to assign counsel for him." In Johnson v. Zerbst, the Supreme Court ruled that in all federal cases, counsel would have to be appointed for defendants who were too poor to hire their own. However, in Betts v. Brady, the Court declined to extend this requirement to the state courts under the Fourteenth Amendment unless the defendant demonstrated "special circumstances" requiring the assistance of counsel.

In 1961, the Court extended the rule that applied in federal courts to state courts. It held in Hamilton v. Alabama that counsel had to be provided at no expense to defendants in capital cases when they so requested, even if there was no "ignorance, feeble mindedness, illiteracy, or the like." Gideon v. Wainwright explicitly overruled Betts v. Brady and found that counsel must be provided to indigent defendants in all felony cases. Under Argersinger v. Hamlin, counsel must be appointed in any case resulting in a sentence of actual imprisonment. However, in Scott v. Illinois, the Court ruled that counsel did not need to be appointed if the defendant was not sentenced to any imprisonment.

In the United States, while the right to counsel in trials by the federal government was recognized by the US Bill of Rights, the affirmation that this right extended to cases tried by state courts (i.e. most criminal trials, including for crimes such as murder in most cases) came much later. While some state supreme courts affirmed this right during the 19th century, it was only in the 1963 decision Gideon v. Wainwright that the Supreme Court affirmed the right for defendants to have counsel in felony trials.

== Ineffective assistance of counsel ==
The constitutional right to counsel necessarily encompasses a right to effective counsel. Mere formal appointment of counsel does not satisfy Sixth Amendment's constitutional guarantees; instead, a criminal defendant is entitled to reasonably competent representation.

In Strickland v. Washington (1984), the Court held that, on collateral review, a defendant may obtain relief if the defendant demonstrates both (1) that defense counsel's performance fell below an objective standard of reasonableness (the "performance prong") and (2) that, but for the deficient performance, there is a reasonable probability that the result of the proceeding would have been different (the "prejudice prong").

To satisfy the prejudice prong of Strickland, a defendant who pleads guilty must show that, but for counsel's deficient performance, he or she would not have pleaded guilty. In Padilla v. Kentucky (2010), the Court held that counsel's failure to inform an alien pleading guilty of the risk of deportation fell below the objective standard of the performance prong of Strickland and permitted an alien who would not have pleaded guilty but for such failure to withdraw his guilty plea.

== Self-representation ==
A criminal defendant may represent himself, unless a court deems the defendant to be incompetent to waive the right to counsel.

In Faretta v. California, 422 U.S. 806 (1975), the Supreme Court recognized a defendant's right to pro se representation. However, under Godinez v. Moran, 509 U.S. 389 (1993), a court can require a defendant to be represented by counsel if it believes the accused is less than fully competent to adequately proceed without counsel. In Martinez v. California Court of Appeals, 528 U.S. 152 (2000), the Supreme Court ruled the right to pro se representation did not apply to appellate courts. In Indiana v. Edwards, 554 U.S. 164 (2008), the Court ruled that a criminal defendant could be simultaneously competent to stand trial and yet not competent to represent himself. The Court ultimately concluded that, in light of these rules, a state may require an otherwise competent criminal defendant to proceed to trial with the assistance of counsel. The standard for competency to stand trial presumes that the defendant will have a lawyer to assist him at that trial. Implicit therefore in the Dusky rule is the idea that the standard for competency to stand trial must be lower than the standard for competency to represent oneself. The right to represent oneself at trial is qualified by the trial court's interest in preserving courtroom decorum and promoting the orderly presentation of evidence, questioning of witnesses, and advancement of legal argument. For the Court, it was "common sense" that a defendant's mental illness might impair his ability to accomplish these tasks—tasks that any lawyer must if he is to press his client's case effectively. "A right of self-representation at trial will not affirm the dignity of a defendant who lacks the mental capacity to conduct his defense without the assistance of counsel."

In Bounds v. Smith, 430 U.S. 817 (1977), the Supreme Court held that the constitutional right of "meaningful access to the courts" can be satisfied by counsel or access to legal materials. Bounds has been interpreted by several United States courts of appeals to mean a pro se defendant does not have a constitutional right to access a prison law library to research his defense when access to the courts has been provided through appointed counsel.

== Geders rule ==
Geders v. United States , 425 US 80, was a 1976 Supreme Court decision holding that the Sixth Amendment right to counsel was violated by a court order that prohibited a criminal defendant from consulting his attorney during an overnight recess. To avoid improperly influencing the defendant before cross-examination, the trial judge said the attorney must not consult with the defendant "about anything" during the overnight recess. Geders was convicted and his appeals made it to the Supreme Court. Because the right of criminal defendants to counsel applies at "every step in the proceedings", the Court said there were better ways to prevent witness "coaching".

However, in 1989, Perry v. Leeke, 488 US 272, held that the Geders rule did not apply during a 15-minute recess between testimony and cross-examination. In October 2025, the Supreme Court heard argument in Villarreal v. Texas to decide whether a trial judge may prohibit conferring with a defendant during an overnight recess if the order is limited to discussion about the ongoing testimony.

== Similar state-law provisions ==
In Louisiana, the state Supreme Court has discussed at what point the right to counsel attached under the state and federal constitutions in State v. Hattaway, 621 So. 2d 796 (La. 1993). In this case, the Court repeated the Brewer condition that the Sixth Amendment right to counsel attaches after the commencement of adverse judicial criminal proceedings, and that the right exists only during pre-trial confrontations that can be considered "critical stages" during adverse judicial criminal proceedings. 621 So.2d at 801. No clear definition of a critical stage was given, but interrogation of a defendant by police officers was offered as an example of a critical stage in that case.

Some states extend the right to counsel to all matters where a defendant's liberty interest is threatened. The New Jersey Supreme Court unanimously held that, regardless of whether the proceeding is labeled as civil, criminal, or administrative, if a defendant faces a loss of liberty, she or he is entitled to appointed counsel if indigent. Anne Pasqua, et al. v. Hon. Gerald J. Council, et al., 186 N.J. 127 (2006) (March 2006).

== Application to state offenses ==
Until 1963, the right to counsel only applied to criminal defendants accused of federal crimes. However, in Gideon v. Wainwright, the Supreme Court held that the right to counsel also applied to state criminal defendants.
