= Williams v. Florida =

- Supreme Court of the United States

Argued March 4, 1970 Decided June 22, 1970
- Full case name: Williams v. State of Florida
- Citations: 399 U.S. 78 (more) 90 S. Ct. 1893; 26 L. Ed. 2d 446; 1970 U.S. LEXIS 98
- Argument: Oral argument

Case history
- Prior: Williams v. State, 224 So. 2d 406 (Fla. 3d DCA 1969); cert. granted, 396 U.S. 955 (1969).

Holding
- (1) The Fifth Amendment privilege against self-incrimination does not excuse a criminal defendant from giving the prosecution notice of the identities of his alibi witnesses. (2) The Sixth Amendment does not require that a jury must consist of 12 jurors.

Court membership
- Chief Justice Warren E. Burger Associate Justices Hugo Black · William O. Douglas; John M. Harlan II · William J. Brennan Jr. Potter Stewart · Byron White; Thurgood Marshall · Harry Blackmun

Case opinions
- Majority: White, joined by Burger, Brennan; Harlan, Stewart, Marshall (Part I); Black, Douglas (Part II)
- Concurrence: Burger
- Concur/dissent: Black, joined by Douglas
- Concur/dissent: Harlan
- Concur/dissent: Stewart
- Dissent: Marshall (in part)
- Blackmun took no part in the consideration or decision of the case.

Laws applied
- U.S. Const. amends. V, VI, XIV

Williams v. Florida, 399 U.S. 78 (1970), is a United States Supreme Court case in which the Court held that the Fifth Amendment does not entitle a defendant in a criminal trial to refuse to provide pre-trial notice of some details of his alibi witnesses to the prosecution, and that the Sixth Amendment does not require a jury to have 12 members.

== Background ==
Williams had been convicted of robbery in Florida and sentenced to life imprisonment. Williams's defense had been alibi, and Florida law required him to notify the prosecution, in advance of the trial, of the names of his alibi witnesses, so that the prosecution could try to obtain rebuttal evidence. Williams argued that the requirement to assist the prosecution in this way violated his Fifth Amendment right not to incriminate himself.

Also, in 1967 Florida had reduced the number of jurors in all non-capital cases from 12 to 6, and so Williams had been convicted by a jury of six. Williams argued that the Sixth Amendment not only guaranteed the right to a jury trial, but also required that a jury must have all the characteristics it had under the common law, including that it consist of 12 persons.

The Florida District Court of Appeal ruled against Williams on both issues. The Florida Supreme Court did not have jurisdiction to hear the case, and in 1969 the US Supreme Court agreed to hear the case.

== Opinion of the Court ==
The Court held that Florida's notice-of-alibi rule did not violate the Fifth Amendment. The Fifth Amendment would not be violated if, after the alibi witness had given evidence, the court granted a continuance to allow the prosecution to seek rebuttal evidence (this point was conceded by Williams's lawyers). Consequently, all the notice-of-alibi law did was allow the prosecution to do so before the trial, instead of having to interrupt the trial. It did not provide the prosecution with more information to use against a defendant than they would eventually get in any event.

The Court also held that the Sixth Amendment did not require a particular number of jurors. The point of a jury trial was to prevent oppression by the government:

Providing an accused with the right to be tried by a jury of his peers gave him an inestimable safeguard against the corrupt or overzealous prosecutor and against the compliant, biased, or eccentric judge.

This function of a jury could be performed just as well by six jurors as by twelve:

[T]he essential feature of a jury obviously lies in the interposition between the accused and his accuser of the common sense judgment of a group of laymen... The performance of this role is not a function of the particular number of the body that makes up the jury.

== Subsequent developments ==
A companion case, Dunn v. Louisiana, was dismissed for lack of jurisdiction in a one-line per curiam opinion noting that Justice Marshall would have reversed for the reasons provided in his dissent in Williams.

Eight years later, in Ballew v. Georgia, the Supreme Court held that a jury of 5 was unconstitutional.
