= United States criminal procedure =

United States criminal procedure derives from several sources of law: the baseline protections of the United States Constitution; federal and state statutes; federal and state rules of criminal procedure (such as the Federal Rules of Criminal Procedure); and state and federal case law. Criminal procedures are distinct from civil procedures in the US.

== Sources of law ==
=== U.S. Constitution ===
The United States Constitution, including the United States Bill of Rights and subsequent amendments, contains the following provisions regarding criminal procedure. Due to the incorporation of the Bill of Rights, all of these provisions apply equally to criminal proceedings in state courts, with the exception of the Grand Jury Clause of the Fifth Amendment, the Vicinage Clause of the Sixth Amendment, and (maybe) the Excessive Bail Clause of the Eighth Amendment.

- Article Three, Section Two, Clause Three:
  - Jury Clause
  - Venue Clause
- Fifth Amendment:
  - Grand jury clause
  - Double Jeopardy Clause
  - Self-Incrimination Clause
  - Due process clause
  - Takings Clause
- Sixth Amendment:
  - Speedy Trial Clause
  - Public trial clause
  - Impartial Jury Clause
  - Vicinage Clause
  - Information Clause
  - Confrontation Clause
  - Compulsory Process Clause
  - Assistance of Counsel Clause
- Eighth Amendment:
  - Excessive Bail Clause
- Fourteenth Amendment:
  - Due process clause
  - Equal Protection Clause

=== Federal statutes and rules ===
Federal statutes and rules apply to criminal proceedings in federal courts, such as:

- Federal Rules of Criminal Procedure
- Jencks Act

=== State statutes and rules ===
Each state has its own statutes and rules of criminal proceeding applying to proceedings in its courts.

== Charging instruments ==
In a criminal case, the government generally brings charges in one of two ways: either by accusing a suspect directly in a "bill of information" or other similar document, or by bringing evidence before a grand jury to allow that body to determine whether the case should proceed. If the grand jury determines that there is enough evidence to justify the bringing of charges, then the defendant is indicted. In the federal system, a case must always be brought before a grand jury for indictment if it is punishable by death or more than one year in prison; some states, however, do not require indictment.

== Petit juries ==
Once charges have been brought, the case is then brought before a petit jury, (or what is commonly recognized as the normal courtroom jury of six to twelve members), or is tried by a judge alone, if the defense requests it. Any petit jury is selected from a pool by the prosecution and defense.

After both sides have presented their cases and made closing arguments, the judge gives the jury legal instructions; the jury then adjourns to deliberate in private. The jury generally must unanimously agree on a verdict of guilty or not guilty; however, the Supreme Court has upheld non unanimous jury verdicts, so long as the jury is larger than 6 people. In 1972, the Court upheld convictions in Apodaca v. Oregon and Johnson v. Louisiana where Oregon and Louisiana convicted Petitioners on 10-to-2 and 9-to-3 verdicts respectively. In 1979, the Court ruled in Burch v. Louisiana that where a jury was made of 6 people, the verdict must be unanimous.

== Presentation of evidence ==
The prosecution gives an opening statement that summarizes its general arguments. The defense can then present its opening statement or may opt to wait until the prosecution has finished presenting its complete case. The prosecution presents its case first. This is done by calling witnesses to give testimony and by presenting physical evidence that will prove the defendant is guilty of the crime. Witnesses are people who can give testimony that will help prove the guilt of the defendant. They may have actually seen events related to the crime, may have relevant information about the defendant, or may be able to give expert testimony concerning the evidence or have other important information. After the prosecution finishes, it is the time for the defense to address the court.

The defense may start by asking the judge to dismiss the case for lack of evidence. If the judge agrees the evidence is insufficient to prove the defendant committed the crime without a reasonable doubt, the case will be dismissed and the defendant will be free of the charges. Usually, the judge does not dismiss the case. At this time, the defense will give its opening statement if it has not already done so. The defense then proceeds to present its case by calling witnesses and submitting evidence that will prove the defendant did not commit the crime. All witnesses may be cross-examined by the opposing side while testifying. Under the Fifth Amendment to the United States Constitution, the defendant is not required to be a witness in his own defense. If he does not testify, the jury can not hold this against him. Also under the Fifth Amendment, a witness has the right not to incriminate himself. This means the witness is not required to answer any question if doing so would incriminate himself. After the defense finishes presenting its case, each side gives a closing statement summarizing the evidence that supports its position of either guilt or innocence. The closing statements are given in the same order, with the defense going last. Then the deliberation phase of the trial begins.

== Verdict ==
=== Burden of proof ===
The burden of proof is on the prosecution in a criminal trial. This means the prosecution must prove beyond a reasonable doubt that the defendant is guilty of the crime. The defense has no burden of proof and is presumed innocent during all stages of a criminal trial.

=== Deliberation ===
Once the prosecution and defense present their cases, the judge will give the case to the jury. First the judge will instruct the jury about any legal rules that may affect their decision. The judge then sends the jury to the jury room to deliberate about whether the defendant is guilty or not guilty of the charges. During the trial the jury is not allowed to read about the case or discuss it with anyone, even each other. Sometimes juries are sequestered or kept together, away from their homes and any media coverage of the trial.

Once deliberation begins the jurors are allowed to talk to each other. They are to remain together, except overnight, until they either reach a decision or determine they cannot reach a decision. In the latter occurrence, the jury is said to be deadlocked and is called a hung jury. If the jury decides, this is called the verdict. They inform the judge and return to the courtroom where the verdict is read. The judge may either accept the verdict or overrule it. It is rare for the verdict to be overruled. This happens when the judge thinks the verdict is unlawful. Often this is because the jury does not follow the legal instructions. It can also happen if the judge thinks the jury interpreted the evidence in a manner that was not legal. Once the verdict is determined, the trial moves to the punishment phase. This can simply be the judge issuing the punishment sentence or, in more serious cases, can involve a separate hearing.

== Sentencing ==
If a defendant is found guilty, sentencing follows, often at a separate hearing after the prosecution, defense, and court have developed information based on which the judge will craft a sentence. The United States Sentencing Commission has promulgated guidance on what restitution and prison terms should be assessed for different crimes. In capital cases, a separate "penalty phase" occurs, in which the jury determines whether to recommend that the death penalty should be imposed. As with the determination of guilt phase, the burden is on the prosecution to prove its case, and the defendant is entitled to take the stand in his or her own defense, and may call witnesses and present evidence.

== Appeals ==
After sentencing, the case enters the post conviction phase. Usually the defendant begins serving the sentence immediately after the sentence is issued. The defendant may appeal the outcome of his trial to a higher court. American appellate courts do not retry the case. These courts only examine the record of the proceedings of the lower court to determine if errors were made that require a new trial, resentencing, or a complete dismissal of the charges. The prosecution may not appeal after an acquittal, although it may appeal under limited circumstances before the verdict is rendered. The prosecution may also appeal the sentence itself. Increasingly, there is also a recognition that collateral consequences of criminal charges may result from the sentence that are not explicitly part of the sentence itself.

== See also ==
- Criminal procedure
