= Strauder v. West Virginia =

- Supreme Court of the United States

Argued October 20–21, 1879 Decided March 1, 1880
- Full case name: Strauder v. West Virginia
- Citations: 100 U.S. 303 (more) 25 L. Ed. 664; 1879 U.S. LEXIS 1830

Case history
- Prior: State v. Strauder, 8 W. Va. 686 (1874), verdict and sentence rev'd on state law grounds; State v. Strauder, 11 W. Va. 745 (1877), verdict and sentence aff'd on constitutional grounds

Holding
- 1. A state law that excludes citizens from jury service on account of race or color is a denial of the equal protection of the law; and 2. It is within Congress's power under Section 5 of the Fourteenth Amendment to provide for the removal to federal court those cases arising under state law where that state's law denies a party the equal protection of their rights.

Court membership
- Chief Justice Morrison Waite Associate Justices Nathan Clifford · Noah H. Swayne; Samuel F. Miller · Stephen J. Field; William Strong · Joseph P. Bradley; Ward Hunt · John M. Harlan

Case opinions
- Majority: Strong, joined by Waite, Swayne, Miller, Bradley, Hunt, Harlan
- Dissent: Field, joined by Clifford

Laws applied
- U.S. Const. amend. XIV, Civil Rights Act of 1866

Strauder v. West Virginia, 100 U.S. 303 (1880), is a landmark decision of the Supreme Court of the United States about racial discrimination and United States constitutional criminal procedure. Strauder was the first instance where the Supreme Court reversed a state court decision denying a defendant's motion to remove his criminal trial to federal court pursuant to Section 3 of the Civil Rights Act of 1866.

Its holding, along with those of its companion cases of Virginia v. Rives (1880) and Ex parte Virginia (1880) established the proposition that it is a denial to criminal defendants of the equal protection of the law for a state to exclude persons from service on a grand or petit jury on account of race, color, or previous condition of servitude. These holdings do not guarantee criminal defendants that the grand or petit juries involved in their case will be composed either in full or in part of members of a non-white defendant's race (as was sought in the Rives case), but held instead that equal protection demands only that potential jurors could not be excluded from jury service on account of their race. Additionally, the Supreme Court did not exercise its power of judicial review to strike down West Virginia's juror qualifications statute as unconstitutional, as Strauder and his attorneys did not seek such a remedy. Instead, Strauder desired his case be removed to federal court, where he expected he could receive a venire that included freedmen.

In Strauder and the companion cases, the Supreme Court also issued a narrow interpretation of the removal provision of the Civil Rights Act of 1866. For a case to be removed to federal court, the denial of rights must occur in the constitution or laws of the state, or in other pre-trial actions of state officials, that state courts are without power to remedy—that is, it held that the Civil Rights Act required removal be based on objectively discernible facts about the denial of rights (such as the exclusion of freedmen from the jury pool by Judge Coles in Ex parte Virginia, despite Virginia law allowing freedmen to serve as jurors, an act in violation of the Civil Rights Act of 1875), and not the defendant's subjective beliefs about potential outcomes of a state-administered trial. The Supreme Court provided that the remedy for denials of equal protection occurring during trial can be found in the appeals process; only those cases where equal rights cannot be enforced before state judicial bodies are appropriate to be removed to federal court.

== Background ==
On the morning of April 18, 1872 in Wheeling, West Virginia, Taylor Strauder, a former slave, allegedly murdered his wife Anna by bludgeoning her to death with two strikes from a hatchet handle to the left side of her head after having argued with her through the night about an allegation of her marital infidelity. Strauder's step-daughter, Fannie Green, supposedly witnessed the murder, and alleged that Strauder threatened Green to remain quiet, lest she too be killed. Strauder allegedly fled and was arrested in Pittsburgh, Pennsylvania on April 25, 1872.

== Procedural history ==
Following the passage and ratification of the Thirteenth Amendment in 1865, Congress passed the Civil Rights Act of 1866. Under section 3 of the act, Congress provided to defendants in state trials the right to remove to federal court "all causes, civil or criminal," arising under state or municipal laws wherein "any of the rights secured to [the defendant] by the first section of this act" were denied or could not be enforced. Later fearing that the Thirteenth Amendment might not provide a sufficient legal basis for the Civil Rights Act, Congress passed and the states ratified the Fourteenth Amendment. Congress then passed the act of May 31, 1870, of which section 18 reenacted the Civil Rights Act of 1866. Moreover, section 16 of the 1870 act also provided that "all persons within the jurisdiction of the United States shall have the same right in every State and Territory in the United States... to the full and equal benefit of all laws and proceedings for the security of person and property as is enjoyed by white citizens[.]"

=== First trial ===
Upon his return to Wheeling, Strauder appeared before the circuit court for Ohio County, West Virginia and received a preliminary examination before Judge Thayer Melvin. The court assigned George O. Davenport and Blackburn B. Dovener as Strauder's counsel, and set his arraignment for the May 1872 term of the circuit court. On May 20, 1872 the grand jury returned an indictment for murder in the first degree. Strauder demurred the indictment as defective, arguing the facts alleged did not rise to murder in the first degree, and that the panel from which the grand jury was selected excluded non-whites; the court overruled the arguments. Counsel for Strauder then attempted to remove the case to the U.S. district court for West Virginia, but this too was overruled. Strauder then pleaded not guilty by reason of temporary insanity and asked the court for a continuance to the October term, which was granted. At the next term, Strauder received a second continuance to the May 1873 term.

During the first continuance, the State of West Virginia adopted a new state constitution in August 1872. The state legislature reconstructed the state courts and passed a criminal procedure bill on April 3, 1873 providing criminal defendants with preliminary examinations to occur at the county court (as distinguished from the circuit court for the county). At the May 1873 term of the circuit court, Strauder made a motion requesting this examination before the county court. The circuit court denied the motion, citing the preliminary examination the circuit court had already given. The case then proceeded to trial over May 6–8, 1873; the jury returned a verdict of guilty after approximately 90 minutes of deliberations. The court sentenced Strauder to death by hanging on July 8, 1873.

=== First appeal ===
On appeal, the Supreme Court of Appeals of West Virginia held on July 20, 1874 that, since Strauder's case had not yet commenced trial at the time of the passage of the April 3, 1873 statute providing for a preliminary examination before trial, Strauder's case was within the scope of the statute. Since Strauder had timely made the request for the examination, the ruling of the circuit court denying the examination by the county court on grounds that the statute wasn't applicable to the case was reversed. "The error of the circuit court in refusing the accused an examination before the county court of the county of Ohio upon said charge of murder, is fatal to all the other proceedings in the cause by which the accused was tried, convicted and sentenced to be hung..." Consequently, the supreme court reversed the circuit court's denial of the request for the preliminary examination, overruled and nulled all rulings made in the case after that point, set aside the verdict, and remanded the case with instructions that the preliminary examination take place in the county court in accordance with the law.

=== Second trial ===
The clerk of the circuit court certified the case to the county court, which completed its preliminary examination on September 9, 1874 and remanded Strauder to the circuit court for trial. A grand jury convened and on October 20, 1874 returned an indictment similar to that of May 20, 1872. Strauder's arraignment on the new indictment took place on November 2, 1874.

At the arraignment, Strauder and his counsel moved to quash the new indictment and to remove the case to federal court on grounds that West Virginia law precluded non-white citizens from grand and petit jury service. During the course of the first trial, an act regarding trial procedure had passed as part of the 1873 reconstruction of the West Virginia courts in consequence of the new state constitution; the act of March 12, 1873 provided "[a]ll white male persons, who are twenty-one years of age and not over sixty, and who are citizens of this State, shall be liable to serve as jurors, except as herein provided." The only exception provided regarded service as a state official. The judge denied both motions. Strauder then demurred each count contained in the indictment and was again overruled. At that point, Strauder pleaded not guilty to the indictment, and the trial proceeded to jury selection, which resulted in an all-white jury. Strauder's counsel raised an objection to the composition of this jury, which was entered, but the court overruled the objection. The trial continued through November 4 when the case went to the jury for deliberations. On November 5, the jury returned a verdict of guilty and a sentence of death. Strauder and his counsel moved for a new trial on grounds of an impartial juror and that the jury contained no jurors of Strauder's race, for which arguments were heard January 5, 1875. The court denied the motion, and proceeded to sentence Strauder to death by hanging on January 9, 1875.

=== Second appeal ===
Arguments before the Supreme Court of Appeals of West Virginia took place June 27, 1876. Strauder's counsel raised 11 points of exception. The supreme court handed down its ruling on November 17, 1877, relying on the opinions of the Supreme Court of the United States in The Slaughter-House Cases and Bradwell v. Illinois to find the Fourteenth Amendment had not been "intended to protect the citizens of any State against unjust legislation by their own State." The West Virginia supreme court consequently affirmed the trial court's denial of the motion to remove of the case to federal court as correct. Strauder's case was then sent back to the Circuit Court of Ohio County for resentencing, but held over until the April 1878 term.

While awaiting resentencing, Strauder and his counsel appealed to the Supreme Court of the United States. On April 15, 1878, Chief Justice Morrison Waite granted a writ of error. The case was set for argument in the October 1879 term, and oral arguments were heard over October 20–21, 1879 along with the companion cases of Virginia v. Rives and Ex parte Virginia. Assisting Strauder's counsel in the arguments before the Supreme Court were U.S. Attorney General Charles Devens and former justice of the Supreme Court of Virginia Westel Willoughby. Arguing for the State of West Virginia were West Virginia Attorney General Robert White and special counsel James W. Green, a Virginia lawyer.

== Decision ==
The majority opinion, written by Justice William Strong, focused on two legal questions:

1. Does the Constitution of the United States afford citizens of the United States a right to trial by a jury selected and empaneled without discrimination against prospective jurors on account of a juror's race or color?
2. If such a right exists and is denied by the state, may the case be removed to federal court pursuant to Congress's power of enforcement under the Fourteenth Amendment?

The majority held that categorical exclusion of blacks from juries for no other reason than their race violated the Equal Protection Clause since the very purpose of the Clause was "to assure to the colored race the enjoyment of all the civil rights that under the law are enjoyed by white persons, and to give to that race the protection of the general government, in that enjoyment, whenever it should be denied by the States." The Court did not say that a law barring blacks from juries violated the rights of potential jury members, but that such an exclusion violated the rights of black criminal defendants since juries would be "drawn from a panel from which the State has expressly excluded every man of [a defendant's] race."

However, the Court did not strike down West Virginia's law respecting juror qualifications as unconstitutional, as Strauder had not challenged the law on that ground. Instead, it proceeded with an analysis of whether the denial of equal protection of the law confronting Strauder was of a nature sufficient to motivate an exercise of Congressional authority under Section 5 of the Fourteenth Amendment to enact federal legislation allowing for the removal of cases such as Strauder's to the local federal district court, presumably where the trial process, under the supervision of a federal judge, would enforce the defendant's rights against the state.

=== Dissent ===
The two dissenting justices, Field and Clifford, explained their position in the case of Ex Parte Virginia, decided the same day. In the latter case, Field wrote, with Clifford joining, "The equality of the protection secured extends only to civil rights, as distinguished from those which are political or arise from the form of the government and its mode of administration."

== Subsequent case history ==
The Supreme Court of the United States on July 9, 1880 remanded the case to the Supreme Court of Appeals of West Virginia, and ordered that the court reverse the decision of the circuit court and remand the case for further proceedings. By August 17, 1880, the Supreme Court of Appeals had done as ordered, setting aside the verdict and sentence of the second trial, and reversing the ruling of the circuit court that had denied to Strauder the removal of the case to federal court. The orders of the Supreme Court and the Supreme Court of Appeals were entered into the circuit court record on Saturday, August 21, 1880 and the case was ordered to be removed to the U.S. district court.

=== Federal court ===
On Monday, September 6, 1880, the sheriff of Ohio County was served with a writ of habeas corpus to produce Strauder before the U.S. district court the next day and to show cause why he was being held. Over the next two days, before Judge John Jay Jackson Jr., arguments were heard over why the writ should be quashed, the state seeking to maintain its custody of Strauder. Arguments were also heard whether Strauder should be released pending the next hearings, or bail set. On Thursday, September 9, the court denied the state's motion to quash the writ, ordered custody of Strauder be transferred to the U.S. Marshal, and that a bail hearing for Strauder be scheduled. By October 9, Judge Jackson denied both discharge and bail.

The case was next heard on Thursday, January 13, 1881, whereupon Strauder entered a plea of abatement to defeat the 1874 indictment on the grounds that it too suffered from the constitutional deficiency passed upon by the Supreme Court—that is, the venire from which the grand jury had been drawn in May 1874, subject to the same 1873 jury law, excluded non-whites as jurors. On Saturday, April 30, 1881, Judge Jackson ruled in favor of Strauder, quashing the 1874 indictment and discharging Strauder from federal custody.

=== Rearrest ===
Anticipating that the federal court would discharge Strauder, the Wheeling Chief of Police Henry Conant swore out in secret a new warrant for Strauder's arrest before Aquilla B. Caldwell of the First Judicial Circuit on April 7, 1881. When the federal court then in fact discharged Strauder, Conant immediately moved to rearrest Strauder in the courtroom; Judge Jackson objected, causing Conant to withdraw. Conant instead rearrested Strauder upon his leaving the federal courthouse, and both returned to Wheeling on May 2. The next day, arguments were heard before Judge Caldwell regarding the circuit court's jurisdiction. Strauder and his counsel argued that even though the U.S. district court had discharged Strauder, it had only done so on the 1874 indictment, and since the state's prosecutor had never made a declaration of nolle prosequi or otherwise dismissed the 1872 indictment, and since the entire case had been certified to the federal district court, both the 1872 and 1874 indictments were under the federal court's jurisdiction when the April 7 warrant had issued. Further, since the 1872 indictment was still pending before the federal court, it still had jurisdiction over the case. As such, argued Strauder, the state circuit court had no jurisdiction, rendering its warrant invalid. Judge Caldwell ultimately agreed that the 1872 indictment was still alive and before the federal court, and ordered Strauder discharged from state custody, finally freeing Strauder from his nine-years confinement.

== Impact ==
While a victory for the rights of black defendants and an important early civil rights case, dicta from Strauder v. West Virginia implies the right of states to bar women or other classes from juries by holding, in the words of Justice Strong, that a state "may confine the selection to males, to freeholders, to citizens, to persons within certain ages, or to persons having educational qualifications. We do not believe the Fourteenth Amendment was ever intended to prohibit this.... Its aim was against discrimination because of race or color." The precedent set by Strauder has continued to influence rulings in cases as late as 1961 in Hoyt v. Florida.

Because it was not raised in the context of Strauder, the Court also did not consider in its analysis whether state actions that have a disparate impact upon African-Americans would violate the Equal Protection Clause; that question was not considered until almost a century later in Washington v. Davis, which reaffirmed that Strauder "established that the exclusion of [African-Americans] from grand and petit juries in criminal proceedings violated the Equal Protection Clause, but the fact that a particular jury or a series of juries does not statistically reflect the racial composition of the community does not, in itself, make out an invidious discrimination forbidden by the Clause." 246 U.S. 229 (1976).

== See also ==
- Batson v. Kentucky
