= Scott v. Illinois =

- Supreme Court of the United States

Argued December 4, 1978 Decided March 5, 1979
- Full case name: Scott v. Illinois
- Citations: 440 U.S. 367 (more) 99 S. Ct. 1158; 59 L. Ed. 2d 383; 1979 U.S. LEXIS 3

Case history
- Prior: Original action filed in U.S. Supreme Court; order to show cause why writ of mandamus should not issue, December, 1801
- Subsequent: None

Holding
- A person may be imprisoned only if given the opportunity to be represented by counsel.

Court membership
- Chief Justice Warren E. Burger Associate Justices William J. Brennan Jr. · Potter Stewart; Byron White · Thurgood Marshall; Harry Blackmun · Lewis F. Powell Jr. William Rehnquist · John P. Stevens

Case opinions
- Majority: Rehnquist, joined by Burger, Stewart, White, Powell
- Concurrence: Powell
- Dissent: Brennan, joined by Marshall, Stevens
- Dissent: Blackmun

Laws applied
- U.S. Const. amends. VI, XIV

Scott v. Illinois, 440 U.S. 367 (1979), was a case heard by the Supreme Court of the United States. In Scott, the Court decided whether the Sixth and Fourteenth Amendments required Illinois to provide Scott with trial counsel. To emphasize the importance of court-appointed counsel, the Court opined, "[T]he interest protected by the right to have guilt or innocence determined by a jury... while important, is not as fundamental to the guarantee of a fair trial as is the right to counsel."

== Background ==
After being denied a request for court-appointed counsel, Scott was convicted in a bench trial of shoplifting and fined $50. The statute applicable to his case set the maximum penalty at a $500 fine and one year in jail.

== Supreme Courts decision ==
A majority held that Illinois had not violated the Constitution. Writing for four of the justices, Rehnquist clarified the Court's holding in Argersinger v. Hamlin (1972) and argued that states could sentence a convicted criminal to imprisonment only if that person had been represented by counsel. Since Scott was not sentenced to imprisonment, even though the applicable statute allowed for it, the state was not obligated to provide counsel. Rehnquist called that line of reasoning "the central premise of Argersinger."

Justice Brennan dissented, drawing a distinction between "actual imprisonment" and "authorized imprisonment." He read Argersinger as saying that the right to jury trial existed when (1) a non-petty offense punishable by more than 6 months of jail time and (2) actual imprisonment was likely despite the authorized maximum penalty.

Brennan viewed authorized imprisonment as a more accurate standard because criminal statutes were written with this standard in mind and the social stigma attached to a crime took it into account.

Brennan also said the majority's reason for going with the actual imprisonment standard was budgetary. He said that this was an inappropriate standard when dealing with constitutional guarantees.

== See also ==
- List of United States Supreme Court cases, volume 440
