= Beck v. Washington =

- Supreme Court of the United States

Argued November 14, 1961 Decided May 14, 1962
- Full case name: David D. Beck v. State of Washington
- Docket no.: 40
- Citations: 369 U.S. 541 (more)
- Argument: Oral argument
- Reargument: Reargument
- Opinion announcement: Opinion announcement

Holding
- The court held that intensive and voluminous news coverage in the vicinity where the defendant was indicted and tried did not violate the Due Process or Equal Protection Clauses of the Fourteenth Amendment

Court membership
- Chief Justice Earl Warren Associate Justices Hugo Black · Felix Frankfurter; William O. Douglas · Tom C. Clark; John M. Harlan II · William J. Brennan Jr. Potter Stewart · Byron White

Case opinions
- Majority: Clark, joined by Harlan, Brennan, Stewart
- Dissent: Black, joined by Warren
- Dissent: Douglas
- Frankfurter and White took no part in the consideration or decision of the case.

Beck v. Washington, 369 U.S. 541 (1962), was a United States Supreme Court case which ruled that intensive and voluminous news coverage in the vicinity where the defendant was indicted and tried did not violate the Due Process or Equal Protection Clauses of the Fourteenth Amendment.
