= United States v. Halper =

- Supreme Court of the United States

Decided May 15, 1989
- Full case name: United States v. Halper
- Citations: 490 U.S. 435 (more)

Holding
- A civil sanction is criminal punishment and can activate the Double Jeopardy Clause if it serves the traditional goals of punishment: retribution or deterrence.

Court membership
- Chief Justice William Rehnquist Associate Justices William J. Brennan Jr. · Byron White; Thurgood Marshall · Harry Blackmun; John P. Stevens · Sandra Day O'Connor; Antonin Scalia · Anthony Kennedy

Case opinions
- Majority: Blackmun, joined by unanimous
- Concurrence: Kennedy

Laws applied
- Double Jeopardy Clause
- Superseded by
- Hudson v. United States (1997)

United States v. Halper, 490 U.S. 435 (1989), was a United States Supreme Court case in which the court held that a civil sanction is criminal punishment and can activate the Double Jeopardy Clause if it serves the traditional goals of punishment: retribution or deterrence.

== Background ==
After Irwin Halper, the manager of a company which provided medical services for patients eligible for federal Medicare benefits, was convicted, among other things, of submitting 65 false claims for government reimbursement in violation of the federal criminal false-claims statute, he was sentenced to prison and fined $5,000. Based solely on facts established by his criminal conviction, the federal district court then granted the government summary judgment in its suit against him under the federal civil False Claims Act (Act).

Under the strict terms of that Act's remedial provision, as it then existed, respondent would have been liable for a civil penalty of $2,000 on each of the 65 false claims, as well as for twice the amount of the government's actual damages of $585 and the costs of the action. However, because the statutorily authorized recovery of more than $130,000 bore no "rational relation" to the sum of the government's actual loss plus its costs in investigating and prosecuting the false claims, which the court approximated at no more than $16,000, the court held that imposition of the full statutory amount would violate the Double Jeopardy Clause of the Fifth Amendment by punishing respondent a second time for the same conduct for which he had been convicted. Since it considered the Act unconstitutional as applied to respondent, the court limited the government's recovery to double damages and costs. The government took a direct appeal to the Supreme Court.

== Opinion of the court ==
The Supreme Court issued an opinion on May 15, 1989.

== Subsequent developments ==
Courts struggled somewhat to apply the Halper test because all civil penalties involve some kind of deterrence. In 1997, the court superseded Halper in Hudson v. United States. Unlike Halper, which disregarded Congress's intent, the Hudson test's analysis is about Congress's express or implied purpose for the penalty. Additionally, the Hudson test determines whether a civil penalty is disproportionate to the conduct being punished by looking at the statute rather than considering the size of the fine or what happened in a particular case.
