= Brooks v. Tennessee =

- Supreme Court of the United States

Decided June 7, 1972
- Full case name: Brooks v. Tennessee
- Citations: 406 U.S. 605 (more)

Holding
- A criminal defendant cannot be forced by law to testify before all other witnesses.

Court membership
- Chief Justice Warren E. Burger Associate Justices William O. Douglas · William J. Brennan Jr. Potter Stewart · Byron White; Thurgood Marshall · Harry Blackmun; Lewis F. Powell Jr. · William Rehnquist

Case opinions
- Majority: Brennan
- Concurrence: Stewart (in judgment)
- Dissent: Burger, joined by Blackmun, Rehnquist
- Dissent: Rehnquist, joined by Burger, Blackmun

Brooks v. Tennessee, 406 U.S. 605 (1972), was a United States Supreme Court case in which the court held that a criminal defendant cannot be forced by law to testify before all other witnesses.

== Background ==
Brooks was tried and convicted in the Circuit Court of Hamilton County, Tennessee, on charges of armed robbery and unlawful possession of a pistol. During the trial, at the close of the State's case, defense counsel moved to delay petitioner's testimony until after other defense witnesses had testified. The trial court denied this motion on the basis of Tenn.Code Ann. § 40-2403 (1955), which required that a criminal defendant "desiring to testify shall do so before any other testimony for the defense is heard by the court trying the case." Although the prosecutor agreed to waive the statute, the trial court refused, stating that "the law is, as you know it to be, that, if a defendant testifies, he has to testify first." The defense called two witnesses, but petitioner himself did not take the stand.

Following the denial of his motion for new trial, petitioner appealed his conviction to the Tennessee Court of Criminal Appeals, which overruled his assignments of error, including his claim that § 40-2403 violated the State and United States Constitutions. The Supreme Court of Tennessee denied review. The Supreme Court granted certiorari to consider whether the requirement that a defendant testify first violated the Federal Constitution.

== Opinion of the court ==
The Supreme Court issued an opinion on June 7, 1972. The court said that a criminal defendant cannot be forced to testify before all other witnesses. To do so is a violation of the right to be silent (by forcing a choice of whether to testify at an inopportune time) and the right to counsel (by forcing a decision of whether to testify without full understanding of the evidence against them).
