= Rock v. Arkansas =

- Supreme Court of the United States

Argued March 23, 1987 Decided June 22, 1987
- Full case name: Rock v. Arkansas
- Citations: 483 U.S. 44 (more) 107 S. Ct. 2704; 97 L. Ed. 2d 37

Holding
- Criminal defendants have a right to testify on their own behalf.

Court membership
- Chief Justice William Rehnquist Associate Justices William J. Brennan Jr. · Byron White; Thurgood Marshall · Harry Blackmun; Lewis F. Powell Jr. · John P. Stevens; Sandra Day O'Connor · Antonin Scalia

Case opinions
- Majority: Blackmun, joined by Brennan, Marshall, Powell, Stevens
- Dissent: Rehnquist, joined by White, O'Connor, Scalia

Laws applied
- Due Process Clause, Compulsory Process Clause, Fifth Amendment

Rock v. Arkansas, 483 U.S. 44 (1987), was a Supreme Court of the United States case in which the Court held that criminal defendants have a constitutional right to testify on their own behalf.

== Significance ==
Rock elevated the right to testify in criminal trials to a constitutional right, but the debate over whether such a right ought to exist did not begin there. Prior to Rock, statutes and courts had recognized rights to represent oneself in a court of law. In Faretta v. California (1975), the United States Supreme Court held that criminal defendants are constitutionally free to decline or reject professional lawyers as legal representation in state-level courts as well as to serve as their own legal counsels in such trials. In that case, the Court noted the lengthy history of the right by stating:

In the federal courts, the right of self-representation has been protected by statute since the beginnings of our Nation. Section 35 of the Judiciary Act of 1789, 1 Stat. 73, 92, enacted by the First Congress and signed by President Washington one day before the Sixth Amendment was proposed, provided that "in all the courts of the United States, the parties may plead and manage their own causes personally or by the assistance of counsel."

The movement in favor of allowing defendants to testify for themselves was popular, but its critics worried that it would destroy the presumption of innocence because of the perception that someone who is innocent of a crime would certainly speak to defend themselves and a person who is guilty of a crime would certainly not do so. This perception is inaccurate because a defendant's past becomes broadly admissible as evidence when they take the stand, so testifying may be against their interests. For example, when an individual with a criminal record testifies in their own trial, that past record can be presented to persuade the jury that they are the kind of person who would have done what they are accused of in the present. In a sense, the critics' worries have come to pass because relevant scholarship indicates that there is a measurable difference between the conviction rates of factually-innocent people whenever they do testify or they do not testify. Juries tend to convict criminal defendants who choose to testify for themselves at higher rates; likewise, juries tend to acquit criminal defendants who decline to testify for themselves.
