= Hudson v. United States =

- Supreme Court of the United States

Decided December 10, 1997
- Full case name: Hudson v. United States
- Citations: 522 U.S. 93 (more)

Holding
- The government may levy a remedial civil penalty after a criminal punishment without violating the Double Jeopardy Clause's prohibition on multiple punishments.

Court membership
- Chief Justice William Rehnquist Associate Justices John P. Stevens · Sandra Day O'Connor; Antonin Scalia · Anthony Kennedy; David Souter · Clarence Thomas; Ruth Bader Ginsburg · Stephen Breyer

Case opinions
- Majority: Rehnquist
- Concurrence: Scalia
- Concurrence: Stevens (in judgment)
- Concurrence: Souter (in judgment)
- Concurrence: Breyer (in judgment), joined by Ginsburg

Laws applied
- Double Jeopardy Clause

Hudson v. United States, 522 U.S. 93 (1997), was a United States Supreme Court case in which the court held that the government may levy a remedial civil penalty after a criminal punishment without violating the Double Jeopardy Clause's prohibition on multiple punishments. Penalty, here, is distinct from punishment. The Double Jeopardy Clause prevents multiple punishments; i.e., the clause would be activated if the penalty was actually punishment. A penalty might actually be punishment if it was intended to be punishment or if it was punishment in effect, based on the text of the statute rather than what occurred in a particular case.

== Background ==
The Office of the Comptroller of the Currency (OCC) imposed monetary penalties and occupational debarment on banking executives including John Hudson for violating 12 U. S. C. §§ 84(a)(1) and 375b. The executives caused two banks in which they were officials, the First National Bank of Tipton and the First National Bank of Hammon, to make certain loans in a manner that unlawfully allowed Hudson to receive the loans' benefit. When the government later criminally indicted the executives for essentially the same conduct, they moved to dismiss under the Double Jeopardy Clause of the Fifth Amendment. The federal district court ultimately dismissed the indictments, but the Tenth Circuit Court of Appeals reversed, relying on United States v. Halper.

== Opinion of the court ==
The Supreme Court issued an opinion on December 10, 1997. The majority opinion "largely disavowed" the reasoning of Halper and sought to return the law to its state before Halper, but the majority did not overrule it. In his concurrence, Justice Breyer described Halper as in a "legal limbo". Instead, the majority leaned on tests including the earlier case United States v. Ward (1980). In other words, the Double Jeopardy Clause prohibits multiple criminal punishments for the same conduct; when Congress labels a penalty as civil, it is possible for it to still be criminal if it was intended as criminal or the effect of it was criminal punishment. That said, civil penalties that are merely "remedial" are generally not criminal punishment. This determination is based on the text of the statute, not on what actually happened in a particular case.
