= Virginia v. Rives =

- Supreme Court of the United States

Argued October 20–21, Decided March 1, 1880
- Full case name: Virginia v. Rives
- Citations: 100 U.S. 313 (more)

Holding
- Sec. 641 of the Revised Statutes provides removal to federal courts as a remedy for constitutional rights violations when a state constitution or legislative act is discriminatory on its face. The Equal Protection Clause is broader than the remedy provided by Sec. 641, and does not require a specific composition of the venire.

Court membership
- Chief Justice Morrison Waite Associate Justices Nathan Clifford · Noah H. Swayne; Samuel F. Miller · Stephen J. Field; William Strong · Joseph P. Bradley; Ward Hunt · John M. Harlan

Case opinions
- Majority: Strong, joined by Waite, Swayne, Miller, Bradley, Hunt, Harlan
- Concurrence: Field, joined by Clifford

Laws applied
- U.S. Const. amend. XIV, Revised Statutes Sec. 641

Virginia v. Rives, 100 U.S. 313 (1880), was a United States Supreme Court case about race discrimination in jury selection. Two black teenagers accused of murdering a white man in Patrick County, Virginia in autumn 1878 were convicted by an all-white jury. Their defense attorneys accused local officials of systematically excluding blacks from the jury pool in violation of the Equal Protection Clause. The Court unanimously ruled that the Equal Protection Clause of the 14th prohibited facially discriminatory laws and intentional discrimination but did not guarantee a mixed-race jury. Rives has not been formally overturned but is no longer considered "good law" because it is effectively superseded by more recent cases.

== Background ==
In the post-Reconstruction era federal courts applied a deferential standard of review to state laws. This era has been called the "Nadir of American Race Relations" by historians after Rayford W. Logan's seminal history The Negro in American Life and Thought:The Nadir, 1877-190. Other cases from the post-Reconstruction era where the Court narrowed federal constitutional rights by applying a deferential standard to review state laws include Plessy v. Ferguson, Williams v. Mississippi and Giles v. Harris.

In the same year that Rives was decided the Court in Strauder v. West Virginia struck down, under the Equal Protection Clause, a West Virginia law that allowed only white men to serve on juries.

== Case history ==
Two black teenagers were accused of murdering a white man in Patrick County, Virginia in autumn 1878. They felt they could not get a fair trial because all the jurors were white. They noted that they had asked local judges and lawyers to include some jurors from their race, but this request was denied. They believed that there was a strong bias against them in their community simply because of their race, which would prevent them from receiving a fair trial, and requested their trial be moved to the Circuit Court of the United States. They pointed out that blacks had never been included in juries in their county, even though it wasn't prohibited by law.

The State court said no and continued with the trial. The defendants were convicted by an all-white jury. However, those convictions were later canceled, and they tried to get the case moved again but were denied. In October 1878 they were tried separately, one was convicted and the jury could not reach agreement in the other case. Eventually, the case was sent to the U.S. Circuit Court, and the defendants were transferred into U.S. custody by a writ of habeas corpus. Virginia petitioned the U.S. Supreme Court to send the defendants back to the local jail in Patrick County to be tried in the state courts.

== Supreme Court ==
=== Decision ===
The 14th amendment protects all persons within the jurisdiction of the United States from state laws that discriminate on the basis of race. One way Congress can enforce the right is by removing the case from State court to federal jurisdiction. The statute at that time authorized removal as a remedy before the trial began. The Court acknowledged the statute is narrower than the amendment and "does not, therefore, embrace many cases in which a colored man's right may be denied." If the rights violation occurred during the trial or sentencing there was no available remedy to remove the case into the federal courts. According to the Court, the remedy of removal provided by Section 641 was intended to reach state constitutions and legislative denials of rights. The remedy was available in Strauder v. West Virginia decided the same year because in that case the West Virginia statute did not allow blacks to serve on juries.

The racial composition of the venire is not enough to prove discriminatory state action; it is possible for an all-white jury to be impartially selected. The Court says:

It is a right to which every colored man is entitled, that in the selection of jurors to pass upon his life, liberty, or property, there shall be no exclusion of his race, and no discrimination against them because of their color. But this is a different thing from the right which it is asserted was denied to the petitioners by the State court...a right to have the jury composed in part of colored men.

== Subsequent developments ==
State courts interpreted Rives as holding that all-white juries were constitutional as long as state law was facially neutral until Norris v. Alabama, decided in 1935. In Norris the U.S. Supreme Court held that states would have to explain the absence of black jurors, if defendants could show such a pattern of only whites being selected as jurors. However, Texas state courts refused to apply Norris to decisions about the exclusion of Mexican-Americans from juries, and continued to demand proof of intent to discriminate in these cases.
