= Ballew v. Georgia =

- Supreme Court of the United States

Argued November 1, 1977 Decided March 21, 1978
- Full case name: Claude D. Ballew v. State of Georgia
- Citations: 435 U.S. 223 (more) 98 S. Ct. 1029; 55 L. Ed. 2d 234; 3 Media L. Rep. 1979

Holding
- A criminal conviction based on a five person jury is unconstitutional, the minimum size for a jury hearing a petty offense is six.

Court membership
- Chief Justice Warren E. Burger Associate Justices William J. Brennan Jr. · Potter Stewart; Byron White · Thurgood Marshall; Harry Blackmun · Lewis F. Powell Jr. William Rehnquist · John P. Stevens

Case opinions
- Plurality: Blackmun, joined by Stevens
- Concurrence: Stevens
- Concurrence: White (in judgment)
- Concurrence: Powell (in judgment), joined by Burger, Rehnquist
- Concur/dissent: Brennan (in judgment), joined by Stewart, Marshall

Laws applied
- United States Constitution, Amendment VI

Ballew v. Georgia, 435 U.S. 223 (1978), was a case heard by the United States Supreme Court that held that a Georgia state statute authorizing criminal conviction upon the unanimous vote of a jury of five was unconstitutional. The constitutional minimum size for a jury hearing petty criminal offenses was held to be six.

== See also ==
- List of United States Supreme Court cases, volume 435
