= Martinez v. Court of Appeal of California =

- Supreme Court of the United States

Argued November 9, 1999 Decided January 12, 2000
- Full case name: Martinez v. Court of Appeal of California, Fourth Appellate District
- Citations: 528 U.S. 152 (more) 120 S. Ct. 684; 145 L. Ed. 2d 597; 2000 U.S. LEXIS 502

Case history
- Prior: Cert. to the Supreme Court of California

Holding
- An appellant in a criminal case does not have the constitutional right to refuse counsel on direct appeal.

Court membership
- Chief Justice William Rehnquist Associate Justices John P. Stevens · Sandra Day O'Connor; Antonin Scalia · Anthony Kennedy; David Souter · Clarence Thomas; Ruth Bader Ginsburg · Stephen Breyer

Case opinions
- Majority: Stevens, joined by Rehnquist, O'Connor, Kennedy, Souter, Thomas, Ginsburg, Breyer
- Concurrence: Kennedy
- Concurrence: Breyer
- Concurrence: Scalia (in judgment)

Martinez v. Court of Appeal of California, 528 U.S. 152 (2000), is a United States Supreme Court case in which the Court decided an appellant who was the defendant in a criminal case cannot refuse the assistance of counsel on direct appeals. This case is in contrast to Faretta v. California, 422 U.S. 806 (1975), which grants criminal defendants the right to refuse counsel for trial purposes.

== Background ==
Salvador Martinez worked as an office assistant for a law firm, and in the service of that firm he was entrusted with $6,000 by the girlfriend of a client for bail. This bail was not posted, and he was accused of embezzlement and theft, and further was convicted and acquitted respectively on these charges. He filed an appeal, a waiver of counsel, and a motion to represent himself (a "pro se" motion). When the Court of Appeals of California rejected the pro se motion, he appealed to the U.S. Supreme Court, which agreed to hear the argument.

The counsel for the appellant, Ronald Maines, argued that due process coupled with the decision in Faretta required the extension of a constitutional right for criminal defendants to refuse to have a court-appointed lawyer argue the appeal, thus requiring the right to extend further to allow criminal defendants to argue their own appeals. This would require any appellant who was a criminal defendant to be allowed, given that the court opted for oral arguments, to be allowed to argue their own case as a constitutional right.

The argument of the counsel for the appellee, Robert Foster, held that there were substantial differences between initial trials and appeals courts, therefore the extension of Faretta to the current question was overreaching. Mr. Maines contended that there must be more than simple "differentiation" between the two situations, but there must be a difference consequential to the holding in Faretta to distinguish the trial and appellate situations.

== Opinion of the Court ==
Justice Stevens states in the opinion that "Our conclusion in Faretta extended only to a defendant’s “constitutional right to conduct his own defense.”" Stevens affirms the decision of the lower court that "There is no constitutional right to self-representation on the initial appeal as of right." This rejects the claim that the right to forgo representation of separate counsel at the appellate level was granted by due process and the Fourteenth Amendment. The court also rejected the notion that court-appointed lawyers would be disloyal to their clients, thus preventing a fair appellate proceeding. Further, since the court rejects this application of the Sixth Amendment to appellate proceedings, then that cannot be held as a claim for the conclusion that a person has the right to represent themselves upon direct appeal. Thus, the opinion of Justice Stevens dismissed not just the Due process claims and the precedent claims of the Faretta decision, but also the potential future claims under the Sixth and Fourteenth Amendments.

Justice Scalia, in a concurrence, suggests that the decision in Faretta does not apply strictly to the question before the court since in the case McKane v. Durston, 153 U.S. 684-688 (1894), the court decided that "there was no constitutional right to an appeal."
