= Excessive Bail Clause =

Clause of the United States Constitution

The Excessive Bail Clause of the Eighth Amendment to the United States Constitution prohibits excessive bail set in pre-trial detention. If a judge posts excessive bail, the defendant's lawyer may make a motion in court to lower the bail or appeal directly to a higher court.

The excessive bail provision of the Eighth Amendment to the United States Constitution is based on old English common law and the English Bill of Rights.

== Origins ==
In England, sheriffs originally determined whether to grant bail to criminal suspects. Because they tended to abuse their power, Parliament passed a statute where bailable and non-bailable offenses were defined. The king's judges often subverted the provisions of the law. It was held that an individual may be held without bail upon the Sovereign's command. Eventually, the Petition of Right of 1628 asserted that the king did not have such authority. Later, technicalities in the law were exploited to keep the accused imprisoned without bail even where the offenses were bailable; such loopholes were for the most part closed by the Habeas Corpus Act 1679. Thereafter, judges were compelled to set bail, but they often required impractical amounts. Finally, the English Bill of Rights (1689) held that "excessive bail ought not to be required". Nevertheless, the bill did not determine the distinction between bailable and non-bailable offenses.

== Text ==
The Eighth Amendment provides:

Excessive bail shall not be required, nor excessive fines imposed, nor cruel and unusual punishments inflicted.

== Interpretation ==
The Excessive Bail Clause currently governs only federal pre-trial detention.

=== Presence at trial ===
In Stack v. Boyle, 342 U.S. 1 (1951), the Court found that a defendant's bail cannot be set higher than an amount that is reasonably likely to ensure the defendant's presence at the trial. In Stack, the Court found bail of $50,000 ($620,192 in 2025) to be excessive, given the limited financial resources of the defendants and a lack of evidence that they were likely to flee before trial.

=== Preventive detention ===
Preventive detentions are when someone is denied bail because the court fears that if the accused is released they will be a danger to the community. Congress authorized preventive detention in the Bail Reform Act of 1984, and the Court upheld the Act in United States v. Salerno, 481 U.S. 739 (1987). The Court held that the only limitation imposed by the bail clause is that "the government's proposed conditions of release or detention not be 'excessive' in light of the perceived evil."

=== Incorporation ===
The incorporation status of the Excessive Bail Clause is unclear. In Schilb v. Kuebel, 404 U.S. 357 (1971), the Court stated in dicta: "Bail, of course, is basic to our system of law, and the Eighth Amendment's proscription of excessive bail has been assumed to have application to the States through the Fourteenth Amendment." In Murphy v. Hunt, 455 U.S. 478 (1982), the Court did not reach the issue because the case was dismissed as moot. Bail was included in the list of incorporated rights in McDonald v. Chicago (2010) footnote 12, citing Schilb.

== U.S. state law ==
Most U.S. states have similar provisions for preventing excessive bail. For example, similar prohibitions are contained in the Connecticut Constitution and the Constitution of Hawaii.

=== Georgia ===
In 2016, a Federal Court began to evaluate the "pre-set" bail system of Calhoun, Georgia. The involvement stems from a history of lacking consideration for the accused citizen's financial means while making a final bail determination. In 2017, Sally Yates became involved in the ongoing case.

=== Michigan ===
In Michigan, a judge or justice may be censured for "setting 'grossly excessive' bail and [thus] showing a 'severe attitude' toward witnesses and litigants", as the Michigan Supreme Court did to a trial judge in 2008.

=== New Hampshire ===
In New Hampshire, a writ of habeas corpus which is a summons to the court, may be used to change the amount of excessive bail; the bail must be "reasonable".

=== New York ===
New York has seen the development of organizations such as The Bronx Freedom Fund to aid in the release of accused individuals who primarily possess less than $1,000 and have a bond at $1,000 or greater.

=== Virginia ===
Virginia's Bill of Rights states: "That excessive bail ought not to be required, nor excessive fines imposed, nor cruel and unusual punishments inflicted; that the privilege of the writ of habeas corpus shall not be suspended unless when, in cases of invasion or rebellion, the public safety may require; and that the General Assembly shall not pass any bill of attainder, or any ex post facto law."

== Notable cases ==
One example of a large bail requirement was a case in Texas where New York real estate heir Robert Durst received a bail of $3 billion. The Durst's lawyer appealed the bail to the Texas Court of Appeals. The court responded that "it could not find a case where bail was set, let alone upheld, at even 1 percent of any of the amounts against the millionaire, regardless of the underlying offense, wealth of the defendant, or any other circumstance." The court reduced bail to $450,000.

Michael Jackson famously argued for lower bail in his trial concerning alleged child sexual abuse, for which he eventually won the court case.

Zachary Cruz (the brother of Nikolas Cruz, who was convicted of killing 17 people at Marjory Stoneman Douglas High School in Parkland, Florida on February 14, 2018) was arrested on March 19, 2018, for trespassing on the campus of Marjory Stoneman Douglas High School. On March 20, 2018, a judge set his bond at $500,000 for the single misdemeanor offense, despite the bond for criminal trespass usually being set at $25. Cruz's attorney requested the bond be lowered, citing the Excessive Bail clause. Cruz subsequently sued the Broward County Sheriff's Office for violating his civil rights. The lawsuit was settled in 2019 with Cruz being paid compensation of $3,000.
