= Argersinger v. Hamlin =

- Supreme Court of the United States

Argued December 6, 1971 Reargued February 28, 1972 Decided June 12, 1972
- Full case name: Jon Richard Argersinger v. Raymond Hamlin, Sheriff, Leon County, Florida
- Docket no.: 70-5015
- Citations: 407 U.S. 25 (more) 92 S. Ct. 2006; 32 L. Ed. 2d 530; 1972 U.S. LEXIS 139
- Argument: Oral argument

Case history
- Procedural: Certiorari to the Florida Supreme Court, 236 So. 2d 442.

Holding
- A criminal defendant may not be actually imprisoned unless provided with counsel

Court membership
- Chief Justice Warren E. Burger Associate Justices William O. Douglas · William J. Brennan Jr. Potter Stewart · Byron White; Thurgood Marshall · Harry Blackmun; Lewis F. Powell Jr. · William Rehnquist

Case opinions
- Majority: Douglas, joined by Brennan, Stewart, White, Marshall, Blackmun
- Concurrence: Brennan, joined by Douglas, Stewart
- Concurrence: Burger
- Concurrence: Powell, joined by Rehnquist

Laws applied
- U.S. Const. amends. VI, XIV

Argersinger v. Hamlin, 407 U.S. 25 (1972), is a United States Supreme Court decision holding that the accused cannot be subjected to actual imprisonment unless provided with counsel. Gideon v. Wainwright made the right to counsel provided in the Sixth Amendment applicable to the states through the Fourteenth Amendment.

== Background ==
Argersinger was sentenced under Florida law to 90 days in jail for carrying a concealed weapon but was never represented by counsel. Hamlin was the local sheriff. Argersinger claimed his conviction was unconstitutional, but his case was dismissed by the Florida Supreme Court, who relied on Duncan v. Louisiana, which held that jury trials were not required for crimes with a sentence of less than six months. The Florida court claimed that since jury trials were not required for misdemeanors, then neither was counsel.

== Supreme Court decision ==
The Supreme Court disagreed with the Florida courts and overturned the conviction. The Court held that a criminal defendant may not be actually imprisoned unless provided with counsel.
