= Hamilton v. Alabama (1961) =

- Supreme Court of the United States

Argued October 17, 1961 Decided November 13, 1961
- Full case name: Hamilton v. Alabama
- Citations: 368 U.S. 52 (more) 82 S. Ct. 157; 7 L. Ed. 2d 114; 1961 U.S. LEXIS 167

Case history
- Prior: Ex parte Hamilton, 271 Ala. 88, 122 So. 2d 602 (1960), cert. granted, 364 U.S. 931 (1961).

Holding
- Absence of counsel for petitioner at the time of his arraignment violated his rights under the Due Process Clause of the Fourteenth Amendment.

Court membership
- Chief Justice Earl Warren Associate Justices Hugo Black · Felix Frankfurter; William O. Douglas · Tom C. Clark; John M. Harlan II · William J. Brennan Jr. Charles E. Whittaker · Potter Stewart

Case opinion
- Majority: Douglas, joined by unanimous

Laws applied
- U.S. Const. amend. XIV

Hamilton v. Alabama, 368 U.S. 52 (1961), was a case heard by the Supreme Court of the United States. Hamilton was charged in an Alabama court with breaking and entering a dwelling at night with intent to ravish, and had pleaded not guilty. He had then been convicted and sentenced to death. The Court ruled unanimously that the absence of counsel at the time of his arraignment violated Hamilton's due process rights under the Fourteenth Amendment.
