= List of United States Supreme Court cases involving the Fifth Amendment =

This is a list of cases that appeared before the Supreme Court of the United States involving the Fifth Amendment to the United States Constitution.

== The Grand Jury Clause ==
- Hurtado v. California (1884)
- Ex parte Bain (1887)
- Wong Wing v. United States (1896)
- Maxwell v. Dow (1900)
- United States v. Moreland (1922)
- Beck v. Washington (1962)
- United States v. Miller (1985)
- United States v. Cotton (2002)

== The Double Jeopardy Clause ==
- United States v. Perez (1824)
- United States v. Wilson (1833)
- Ex parte Bigelow (1885)
- Blockburger v. United States (1932)
- Palko v. Connecticut (1937)
- Louisiana ex rel. Francis v. Resweber (1947)
- Yates v. United States (1957)
- Bartkus v. Illinois (1959)
- Fong Foo v. United States (1962)
- Baxstrom v. Herold (1966)
- North Carolina v. Pearce (1969)
- Benton v. Maryland (1969)
- Waller v. Florida (1970)
- Ashe v. Swenson (1970)
- United States v. Dinitz (1976)
- Ludwig v. Massachusetts (1976)
- Burks v. United States (1978)
- Oregon v. Kennedy (1982)
- Heath v. Alabama (1985)
- Grady v. Corbin (1990)
- United States v. Felix (1992)
- United States v. Dixon (1993)
- Hudson v. United States (1997)
- United States v. Lara (2004)
- Blueford v. Arkansas (2012)

== The Self-Incrimination Clause ==
- Hoffman v. United States (1951)
- Ullmann v. United States (1956)
- Curcio v. United States (1957)
- Lawn v. United States (1958)
- Brown v. United States (1958)
- Knapp v. Schweitzer (1958)
- Mills v. Louisiana (1959)
- Reina v. United States (1960)

== See also ==
- List of United States Supreme Court cases involving the First Amendment
