= Crist v. Bretz =

- Supreme Court of the United States

Decided June 14, 1978
- Full case name: Crist v. Bretz
- Citations: 437 U.S. 28 (more)

Case history
- Prior: State ex rel. Bretz v. Sheri, 167 Mont. 363, 539 P.2d 1191; State v. Cline, 170 Mont. 520, 555 P.2d 724; 546 F.2d 1336; Crist v. Cline, 430 U.S. 982; 434 U. S. 980.

Holding
- Jeopardy attaches in a jury trial when the jury is empaneled and sworn because the defendant has an interest in retaining a chosen jury.

Court membership
- Chief Justice Warren E. Burger Associate Justices William J. Brennan Jr. · Potter Stewart; Byron White · Thurgood Marshall; Harry Blackmun · Lewis F. Powell Jr. William Rehnquist · John P. Stevens

Case opinions
- Majority: Stewart
- Concurrence: Blackmun
- Dissent: Burger
- Dissent: Powell, joined by Burger, Rehnquist

Laws applied
- Double Jeopardy Clause

Crist v. Bretz, 437 U.S. 28 (1978), was a United States Supreme Court case in which the court held that jeopardy attaches in a jury trial when the jury is empaneled and sworn because the defendant has an interest in retaining a chosen jury.

== Background ==
Merrel Cline and L. R. Bretz were brought to trial in a Montana court on charges of grand larceny, obtaining money and property by false pretense, and several counts of preparing or offering false evidence. A jury was empaneled and sworn following a three-day selection process. Before the first witness was sworn, however, the two filed a motion drawing attention to the allegation in the false pretenses charge that the defendants' illegal conduct began on January 13, 1974. Effective January 1, 1974, the particular statute relied on in that count of the information had been repealed. The prosecutor moved to amend the information, claiming that "1974" was a typographical error, and that the date on which the defendants' alleged violation of the statute had commenced was actually January 13, 1973, the same date alleged in the grand larceny count. The trial judge denied the prosecutor's motion to amend the information and dismissed the false pretenses count. The State promptly but unsuccessfully asked the Montana Supreme Court for a writ of supervisory control ordering the trial judge to allow the amendment.

Returning to the trial court, the prosecution then asked the trial judge to dismiss the entire information so that a new one could be filed. That motion was granted, and the jury was dismissed. A new information was then filed, charging the appellees with grand larceny and obtaining money and property by false pretenses. Both charges were based on conduct commencing January 13, 1973. Other than the change in dates, the new false pretenses charge described essentially the same offense charged in the earlier defective count.

After a second jury had been selected and sworn, the appellees moved to dismiss the new information, claiming that the Double Jeopardy Clauses of the United States and Montana Constitutions barred a second prosecution. The motion was denied, and the trial began. Cline and Bretz were found guilty on the false pretenses count and sentenced to terms of imprisonment. The Montana Supreme Court, which had previously denied the two habeas corpus relief, affirmed the judgment as to Bretz on the ground that, under state law, jeopardy had not attached in the first trial.

In the meantime, the two had brought a habeas corpus proceeding in a federal District Court, again alleging that their convictions had been unconstitutionally obtained because the second trial violated the Fifth and Fourteenth Amendment guarantee against double jeopardy. The federal court denied the petition, holding that the Montana statute providing that jeopardy does not attach until the first witness is sworn does not violate the United States Constitution. The court held, in the alternative, that, even if jeopardy had attached, a second prosecution was justified, as manifest necessity supported the first dismissal.

The Court of Appeals for the Ninth Circuit reversed. It held that the federal rule governing the time when jeopardy attaches is an integral part of the constitutional guarantee, and thus is binding upon the States under the Fourteenth Amendment. The appellate court further held that there had been no manifest necessity for the Montana trial judge's dismissal of the defective count, and, accordingly, that a second prosecution was not constitutionally permissible.

Cline and Bretz appealed pursuant to 28 U.S.C. § 1254(2), seeking review only of the holding of the Court of Appeals that Montana is constitutionally required to recognize that, for purposes of the constitutional guarantee against double jeopardy, jeopardy attaches in a criminal trial when the jury is empaneled and sworn. We postponed consideration of probable jurisdiction, and the case was argued. Thereafter, the case was set for reargument, and the parties were asked to address the following two questions:

1. Is the rule heretofore applied in the federal courts—that jeopardy attaches in jury trials when the jury is sworn—constitutionally mandated?
2. Should this Court hold that the Constitution does not require jeopardy to attach in any trial—state or federal, jury or nonjury—until the first witness is sworn?

== Opinion of the court ==
The Supreme Court issued an opinion on June 14, 1978.

== Subsequent developments ==
It follows from this rule that, although it is not constitutional to try a defendant twice for the same offense, it is constitutional to charge a defendant twice for the same offense as long as they were not yet in jeopardy when the earlier charge was dismissed.

== See also ==
- Serfass v. United States
