= R v Davis =

- Court: House of Lords
- Full case name: The Crown against Davis
- Decided: 18 June 2008
- Citation: [2008] UKHL 36
- Cases cited: see section below
- Legislation cited: common law European Convention on Human Rights

Case history
- Prior actions: R v Davis (Central Criminal Court, unreported, 25 May 2004; R v Davis (Court of Appeal) [2006] EWCA Crim 1155, [2006] 1 WLR 3130.
- Subsequent action: None

Court membership
- Judges sitting: Lord Bingham, Lord Rodger, Lord Carswell, Lord Brown, Lord Mance

Keywords
- anonymity, fairness, due process

R v Davis [2008] UKHL 36 is a decision of the United Kingdom House of Lords which considered the permissibility of allowing witnesses to give evidence anonymously. In 2002 two men were shot and killed at a party, allegedly by the defendant, Ian Davis. He was extradited from the United States and tried at the Central Criminal Court for two counts of murder in 2004. He was convicted by the jury and appealed. The decision of the House of Lords in June 2008 led to Parliament passing the Criminal Evidence (Witness Anonymity) Act 2008 a month later. This legislation was later replaced by sections 86 to 97 of the Coroners and Justice Act 2009.

== Trial ==
Davis was charged with the murders of Ashley Kenton and Wayne Mowatt who had been present at a party in Hackney, East London, on the morning of January 1, 2002.

Davis, although admitting being present at the party, claimed to have left before the shooting, and relied on an alibi defence. However, three prosecution witnesses identified Davis as the gunman. To protect their identity, the judge ordered that

- they would be allowed to give evidence under pseudonyms
- any details which might identify them were to be withheld from Davis and his legal advisers and they could not be asked any questions which might lead to their identification
- they would be allowed to give evidence from behind screens and their voices disguised electronically.

Davis' counsel, Malcolm Swift QC, objected to these restrictions but was overruled by the trial judge.

== Appeals ==
Davis first appealed to the Court of Appeal on the basis that the judge's orders relating to the anonymity of witnesses were contrary to the common law and Article 6(3)(d) of the European Convention on Human Rights, and therefore Davis could not have received a fair trial. This contention was rejected and Davis' appeal dismissed. However the court did certify a point of law of general public importance:

"Is it permissible for a defendant to be convicted where a conviction is based solely or to a decisive extent upon the testimony of one or more anonymous witnesses?"

This permitted a further appeal to the House of Lords.

The case was heard by five law lords. On 18 June 2008 they unanimously held that Davis had not had a fair trial, since his counsel had been unable adequately to challenge the prosecution evidence or test the reliability of the anonymous witnesses. Davis's defence had been that his ex-girlfriend had told lies about him to the police, or had persuaded other people to tell such lies on her behalf. Without being allowed to know if the anonymous witnesses knew Davis or his ex-girlfriend, and forbidden to ask any questions that might reveal who they were, defence counsel had been so hindered in his attempts to probe their evidence that Davis had not received a fair trial.

The House reviewed all of the major cases in which anonymous witnesses had been allowed, and concluded that the law had developed incrementally in such a way that while no single step towards trials with anonymous witnesses had been obviously wrong, their cumulative effect had now gone too far. As Lord Brown put it:

"If ... the government now think it right to legislate in this field, so be it. Meantime, however, the creeping emasculation of the common law principle must be not only halted but reversed. It is the integrity of the judicial process that is at stake here. This must be safeguarded and vindicated whatever the cost."

However the House did not go so far as to say that anonymous witnesses can never be used in a trial, and listed some examples where they would still be permitted. The effect of the judgement is that witnesses may not give evidence anonymously if to conceal their identity from the defendant and his lawyers would hinder cross-examination or other challenges to their credibility. (Also R v Davis does not affect the rules on concealing the identity of witnesses from the public but not from the defence.) Lord Mance concluded the judgement by saying:

It may well be appropriate that there should be a careful statutory modification of basic common law principles. It is clear from the Strasbourg jurisprudence discussed in this judgment that there is scope within the Human Rights Convention for such modification.

== Reaction ==
The reaction of the police to the decision was negative; John Yates, Assistant Commissioner of the Metropolitan Police described the decision as a cause for grave concern and said

it would seriously hamper the Met's efforts to stamp out gun crime in the black community.

The Justice Secretary, Jack Straw, announced that there would be an immediate review of the law, with the possibility of legislation to reverse the principle established by the decision, and on 4 July 2008, the Criminal Evidence (Witness Anonymity) Bill was introduced in the House of Commons. The bill became law on 21 July 2008, 33 days after the Lords' ruling.

== Cases cited ==
=== United States ===
- Kirby v. United States 174 US 47, 55 (1899)
- Alford v. United States 282 US 687 (1931)
- Pointer v. Texas 380 US 400, 405 (1965)
- Smith v. Illinois 390 US 129, 131 (1968)
- Coy v. Iowa 487 US 1012, 1015 (1988)
- Alvarado v. Superior Court of Los Angeles County 23 Cal 4th 1121, 1137-1140 (2000)
- Crawford v. Washington 124 S Ct 1354, 1359 (2004)

=== New Zealand & Australia ===
- R v Hughes [1986] 2 NZLR 129
- R v Hines [1997] 3 NZLR 529

=== South Africa ===
- S v Leepile (1-3) 1986 (2) SA 333; (4) 1986 (3) SA 661; (5) 1986 (4) SA 187
- S v Pastoors 1986 (4) SA 222

=== United Kingdom ===
- Lord Morley's case (1666) 6 St Trials 770
- Duke of Dorset v Girdler (1720) Prec. Ch. 531-532, 24 English Reports|ER 238
- R v Scaife (1851) 17 QB 238
- Scott v Scott [1913] AC 417
- Coles v Odhams Press Ltd [1936] 1 KB 416
- Attorney General v Butterworth [1963] 1 QB 696
- Connelly v DPP [1964] AC 1254
- R v Socialist Worker Printers and Publishers Ltd, Ex p Attorney-General [1975] QB 637
- Attorney-General v Leveller Magazine Ltd [1979] AC 440
- R v South London Coroner, Ex p Thompson (reported in part at (1982) 126 SJ 625)
- R v DJX, SCY and GCZ (1989) 91 Criminal Appeal Reports|Cr App R 36
- R v Murphy and Another [1990] NI 306
- R v Acton Justices, Ex p McMullen (1990) 92 Cr App R 98, 104
- Julie Doherty (suing as personal representative of Daniel Doherty deceased) v Ministry of Defence (Court of Appeal in Northern Ireland, 5 February 1991, unreported)
- Doherty v Minister of Defence (5 February 1991)
- R v Brindle and Brindle (31 March 1992, unreported)
- R v HM Attorney-General for Northern Ireland, Ex p Devine [1992] 1 WLR 262
- R v Watford Magistrates' Court, Ex p Lenman [1993] Crim LR 388
- R v Taylor and Crabb (unreported), 22 July 1994, Court of Appeal Criminal Division
- R v HM Coroner for North Humberside and Scunthorpe, Ex p Jamieson [1995] QB 1, 17
- R v Liverpool Magistrates' Court, Ex p Director of Public Prosecutions (1996) 161 JP 43
- R v Jack (unreported, 7 April 1998, BAILII: [1998] EWCA Crim 1206)
- R (Al-Fawwaz) v Governor of Brixton Prison [2001] UKHL 69, [2002] 1 AC 556
- R v Singleton [2003] NICA 29, [2004] NI 71
- R v Arnold [2004] EWCA Crim 1293, para 30
- R(D) v Camberwell Green Youth Court [2005] UKHL 4, [2005] 1 WLR 393
- R v Sellick [2005] EWCA Crim 651, [2005] 1 WLR 3257
- R v Al-Khawaja [2005] EWCA Crim 2697, [2006] 1 WLR 1078
- Grant v The Queen [2006] UKPC 2, [2007] 1 AC 1

=== Europe ===
- Kostovski v Netherlands (1989) 12 EHRR 434
- Windisch v Austria (Application No 12489/86) (1990) 13 EHRR 281
- Lüdi v Switzerland (Application No 12433/86) (1992) 15 EHRR 173
- X v United Kingdom (1992) 15 EHRR CD 113
- Prosecutor v Tadic (10 August 1995)
- Prosecutor v Blaskic [1996] IT-95-14 (5 November 1996)
- Doorson v Netherlands (1996) 22 EHRR 330
- Van Mechelen v Netherlands (1997) 25 EHRR 647
- Kok v The Netherlands (Application No 43149/98) Reports of Judgments and Decisions 2000-VI, p 597
- PS v Germany (2001) 36 EHRR 1139
- Lucà v Italy (2001) 36 EHRR 807
- Birutis v. Lithuania (Applications Nos 47698/99 and 48115/99) (unreported) 28 March 2002
- Krasniki v Czech Republic (Application No 51277/99) (unreported) 28 February 2006
