= Double Jeopardy Clause =

U.S. constitutional law preventing repeated punishment for the same crime

The Double Jeopardy Clause of the Fifth Amendment to the United States Constitution provides: "[N]or shall any person be subject for the same offence to be twice put in jeopardy of life or limb..." The four essential protections included are prohibitions against, for the same offense:

- retrial after an acquittal;
- retrial after a conviction;
- retrial after certain mistrials; and
- multiple punishment

Jeopardy attaches in jury trial when the jury is empaneled and sworn in, in a bench trial when the court begins to hear evidence after the first witness is sworn in, or when a court accepts a defendant's plea unconditionally. Jeopardy does not attach in a retrial of a conviction that was reversed on appeal on procedural grounds (as opposed to evidentiary insufficiency grounds), in a retrial for which "manifest necessity" has been shown following a mistrial, and in the seating of another grand jury if the prior one refuses to return an indictment.

== "Same offense" ==
In United States v. Felix, the U.S. Supreme Court ruled: "a[n]...offense and a conspiracy to commit that offense are not the same offense for double jeopardy purposes."

Sometimes the same conduct may violate different statutes. If all elements of a lesser offense are relied on to prove a greater offense, the two crimes are the "same offense" for double jeopardy purposes, and the doctrine will bar the second prosecution. This ruling in Felix distinguished between the test in Blockburger and the ruling in Grady v. Corbin regarding the "same conduct" vs "same offense" test, which was later overruled and reverted to Blockburger in United States v. Dixon. In Blockburger v. United States, the Supreme Court held that "where the same act or transaction constitutes a violation of two distinct statutory provisions, the test to be applied to determine whether there are two offenses or only one, is whether each provision requires proof of an additional fact which the other does not". The test was applied in Brown v. Ohio, where the defendant had first been convicted of operating an automobile without the owner's consent, and later of stealing the same automobile. The Supreme Court concluded that the same evidence was necessary to prove both offenses, and that in effect there was only one offense. Therefore, it overturned the second conviction.

In other cases, the same conduct may constitute multiple offenses under the same statute, for instance where one robs many individuals at the same time. There is no explicit bar to separate prosecutions for different offenses arising under the same "criminal transaction", but it is not permissible for the prosecution to re-litigate facts already determined by a jury. In Ashe v. Swenson, the defendant was accused of robbing seven poker players during a game. John Ashe was first tried for, and acquitted of, robbing only one of the players; the defense did not contest that a robbery actually took place. The state then tried the defendant for robbing the second player; stronger identification evidence led to a conviction. The Supreme Court, however, overturned the conviction. It was held that in the first trial, since the defense had not presented any evidence that there was no robbery, the jury's acquittal had to be based on the conclusion that the defendant's alibi was valid. Since one jury had held that the defendant was not present at the crime scene, the State could not re-litigate the issue.

== "Twice put in jeopardy" ==
=== Retrial after acquittal ===
Once acquitted, a defendant may not be retried for the same offense: "A verdict of acquittal, although not followed by any judgment, is a bar to a subsequent prosecution for the same offense." This applies in all cases where a verdict of not guilty is entered by the Court against a defendant. Be it an acquittal returned by the finder of fact (jury during a trial by jury, the judge during a bench trial), a direct acquittal by a judge on motion from the defense, or a ruling that the evidence is insufficient for conviction.

==== Implied acquittals ====
Every charge has specific facts that must be proven beyond reasonable doubt to secure a conviction. And it is not unusual for a prosecutor to charge a person with "lesser included offenses". An oft-mentioned combination is first- and second-degree murder, with second-degree murder being the lesser offense. A person convicted on the lesser charge can never again be tried on the greater charge. If the conviction on the lesser charge is overturned, the greater charge does not then come back into play.

The Supreme Court ruled as such in Green v. United States, establishing the doctrine of "implied acquittal". Everett Green had been tried on charges of arson and first and second degree murder in the U.S. District Court for the District of Columbia. He was convicted on arson and the lesser offense of second degree murder. The verdict was silent on the greater offense. His conviction was overturned due to the appellate court deciding there wasn't enough evidence, remanding for a new trial. At the second trial, he was tried again with arson, first and second degree murder, convicted on the greater offense and sentenced to death.

He appealed, claiming the second trial should not have included the greater offense under the Double Jeopardy Clause. The D.C. Circuit Court rejected the claim. The Supreme Court of the United States overruled, stating that Green was acquitted of first degree murder and, under the Fifth Amendment, could not be retried on that charge.

At Green's first trial, the jury was authorized to find him guilty of either first degree murder (killing while perpetrating a felony) or, alternatively, of second degree murder (killing with malice aforethought). The jury found him guilty of second degree murder, but, on his appeal, that conviction was reversed and the case remanded for a new trial. At this new trial, Green was tried again, not for second degree murder, but for first degree murder, even though the original jury had refused to find him guilty on that charge and it was in no way involved in his appeal. For the reasons stated hereafter, we conclude that this second trial for first degree murder placed Green in jeopardy twice for the same offense in violation of the Constitution.

That the jury did not explicitly return an acquittal on first degree murder in its verdict is immaterial:

In brief, we believe this case can be treated no differently, for purposes of former jeopardy, than if the jury had returned a verdict which expressly read: "We find the defendant not guilty of murder in the first degree but guilty of murder in the second degree."

This case did, in effect, overrule a preceding per curiam decision, that of Brantley v. Georgia. In that case, the lesser charge was voluntary manslaughter and the greater charge was murder. Brantley was convicted on the lesser charge, but was convicted on the greater charge at retrial after the conviction was overturned. He appealed, arguing the inclusion of the greater charge at retrial violated the Double Jeopardy Clause. The Supreme Court rejected that argument: "It was not a case of twice in jeopardy under any view of the Constitution of the United States."

The Supreme Court explicitly overruled Brantley in another, near-identical case, Price v. Georgia:

While the Brantley holding may have had some vitality at the time the Georgia courts rendered their decisions in this case, it is no longer a viable authority and must now be deemed to have been overruled by subsequent decisions of this Court.

The lesser and greater offenses in Price are identical to Brantley, with both being convicted on the lesser offense, and retried on the same charges as in the original trial after the conviction is overturned. Unlike Brantley, Price was convicted again on the lesser offense of voluntary manslaughter and given a similar sentence. Price appealed that conviction. The State of Georgia contended that since Price was not convicted on the greater offense at retrial, which was the case in Brantley, the second indictment constituted "harmless error". The Supreme Court rejected that idea:

The Double Jeopardy Clause, as we have noted, is cast in terms of the risk or hazard of trial and conviction, not of the ultimate legal consequences of the verdict. To be charged and to be subjected to a second trial for first-degree murder is an ordeal not to be viewed lightly. Further, and perhaps of more importance, we cannot determine whether or not the murder charge against petitioner induced the jury to find him guilty of the less serious offense of voluntary manslaughter rather than to continue to debate his innocence.

Noting that the murder charge may have poisoned the jury against Price, the Supreme Court vacated the voluntary manslaughter conviction and remanded the case.

==== Non-final judgments ====
As double jeopardy applies only to charges that were the subject of an earlier final judgment, there are many situations in which it does not apply, despite the appearance of a retrial. For example, a second trial held after a mistrial does not violate the double jeopardy clause because a mistrial ends a trial prematurely without a judgment of guilty or not, as was decided by the Supreme Court in United States v. Perez. Cases involuntarily dismissed because of insufficient evidence may constitute a final judgment for these purposes, though many state and federal laws allow for substantially limited prosecutorial appeals from these orders. Also, a retrial after a conviction that had been set aside upon a motion for new trial, and that subsequently has been reversed on appeal or vacated in a collateral proceeding (such as habeas corpus) would not violate double jeopardy, for the judgment in the first trial had been invalidated. In all of these cases, however, the previous trials do not entirely vanish. Testimony from them may be used in later retrials, such as to impeach contradictory testimony given at any subsequent proceeding.

Prosecutors may appeal when a trial judge sets aside a jury verdict for conviction with a judgment notwithstanding verdict for the defendant. A successful appeal by the prosecution would simply reinstate the jury verdict and so would not place the defendant at risk of another trial.

==== Reversal for procedural error ====
If a defendant appeals a conviction and is successful in having it overturned, the defendant may be subject to retrial.

==== Insufficiency ====
Retrial is not possible if the verdict is overturned on the grounds of evidentiary insufficiency, rather than on the grounds of procedural faults. As noted above, if the trial court made a determination of evidentiary insufficiency, the determination would constitute a final acquittal; in Burks v. United States, the Court held that "it should make no difference that the reviewing court, rather than the trial court, determined the evidence to be insufficient."

==== Fraud ====
If the earlier trial is a fraud, double jeopardy will not prohibit a new trial because the party acquitted has prevented themselves from being placed into jeopardy to begin with. One such case is the trial of Harry Aleman, who was tried and acquitted in 1977 in Cook County, Illinois for the September 1972 death of William Logan. Nearly 20 years later, two persons under Federal Witness Protection came forward to state that Aleman murdered Logan and another individual, and had also bribed the trial judge to return an acquittal.

Following on the new evidence, the Cook County State's Attorney in December 1993 filed new charges alleging Aleman killed William Logan, an identical allegation for which Aleman had been previously acquitted. He was convicted on that charge and sentenced to 100 to 300 years in prison. He appealed that conviction and the indictment, challenging that the second prosecution was barred under the Double Jeopardy Clause. The Seventh Circuit disagreed, stating first that "jeopardy denotes risk", citing Breed v. Jones:

In the constitutional sense, jeopardy describes the risk that is traditionally associated with criminal prosecution.

And also citing Serfass:

Without risk of a determination of guilt, jeopardy does not attach, and neither an appeal nor further prosecution constitutes double jeopardy․ In particular, it has no significance in this context unless jeopardy has once attached and an accused has been subjected to the risk of conviction.

The Seventh Circuit declared that, in rejecting the Double Jeopardy claim, even with the slight risk of conviction following the bribe, Aleman still nullified any legitimate risk:

Aleman may be correct that some risk of conviction still existed after Judge Wilson agreed to fix the case, but it cannot be said that the risk was the sort "traditionally associated" with an impartial criminal justice system.

=== Grand juries and double jeopardy ===
The Double Jeopardy Clause of the Fifth Amendment does not attach in a grand jury proceeding, or bar a grand jury from returning an indictment when a prior grand jury has refused to do so.

=== Retrial after conviction ===
A person who is convicted of one set of charges cannot in general be tried on additional charges related to the crime unless said additional charges cover new facts against which the person in question has not yet been acquitted or convicted. The test that determines whether this can occur is the Blockburger test.

An example of this are the charges of "conspiring to commit murder" and "murder". Both charges typically have facts distinct from each other. A person can be charged with "conspiring to commit murder" even if the murder never actually takes place if all facts necessary to support the charge can be demonstrated through evidence. Further, a person convicted or acquitted of murder can, additionally, be tried on conspiracy as well if it has been determined after the conviction or acquittal that a conspiracy did, in fact, take place.

=== Retrial after mistrial ===
Mistrials are generally not covered by the double jeopardy clause. If a judge dismisses the case or concludes the trial without deciding the facts in the defendant's favor (for example, by dismissing the case on procedural grounds), the case is a mistrial and may normally be retried. Furthermore, if a jury cannot reach a verdict, the judge may declare a mistrial and order a retrial as was addressed in Perez. When the defendant moves for a mistrial, there is no bar to retrial, even if the prosecutor or judge caused the error that forms the basis of the motion. An exception exists, however, where the prosecutor or judge has acted in bad faith. In Oregon v. Kennedy, the Supreme Court held that "only where the governmental conduct in question is intended to 'goad' the defendant into moving for a mistrial may a defendant raise the bar of double jeopardy to a second trial after having succeeded in aborting the first on his own motion."

=== Multiple punishments ===
The defendant may not be punished twice for the same offense. In certain circumstances, however, a sentence may be increased. It has been held that sentences do not have the same "finality" as acquittals, and may therefore be reviewed by the courts.

The prosecution may not seek capital punishment in the retrial if the jury did not impose it in the original trial. The reason for this exception is that before imposing the death penalty the jury has to make several factual determinations and if the jury does not make these it is seen as the equivalent of an acquittal of a more serious offense.

In Arizona v. Rumsey, a judge had held a separate hearing after the jury trial to decide if the sentence should be death or life imprisonment, in which he decided that the circumstances of the case did not permit death to be imposed. On appeal, the judge's ruling was found to be erroneous. However, even though the decision to impose life instead of death was based on an erroneous interpretation of the law by the judge, the conclusion of life imprisonment in the original case constituted an acquittal of the death penalty and thus death could not be imposed upon a subsequent trial. Even though the acquittal of the death penalty was erroneous in that case, the acquittal must stand.

Double jeopardy also does not apply if the later charge is civil rather than criminal in nature, which involves a different legal standard (crimes must be proven beyond a reasonable doubt, whereas civil wrongs need only be proven by preponderance of evidence or in some matters, clear and convincing evidence). Acquittal in a criminal case does not prevent the defendant from being the defendant in a civil suit relating to the same incident (though res judicata operates within the civil court system). For example, O. J. Simpson was acquitted of a double homicide in a California criminal prosecution, but lost a civil wrongful death claim brought over the same victims.

Defendants happening to be on parole from an earlier offense at the time may also be the subject of a parole violation hearing, which is not considered to be a criminal trial. Since parolees are usually subject to restrictions not imposed on other citizens, evidence of actions that were not deemed to be criminal by the court may be re-considered by the parole board. This legal board could deem the same evidence to be proof of a parole violation. Most states' parole boards have looser rules of evidence than is found in the courts – for example, hearsay that had been disallowed in court might be considered by a parole board. Finally, like civil trials parole violation hearings are also subject to a lower standard of proof so it is possible for a parolee to be punished by the parole board for criminal actions that they were acquitted of in court.

In the American military, courts-martial are subject to the same law of double jeopardy, since the Uniform Code of Military Justice has incorporated all of the protections of the U.S. Constitution. The non-criminal proceeding non-judicial punishment (or NJP) is considered to be akin to a civil case and is subject to lower standards than a court-martial, which is the same as a civilian court of law. NJP proceedings are commonly used to correct or punish minor breaches of military discipline. If a NJP proceeding fails to produce conclusive evidence, however, the commanding officer (or ranking official presiding over the NJP) is not allowed to prepare the same charge against the military member in question. In a court-martial, acquittal of the defendant means he is protected permanently from having those charges reinstated.

One notable exception to double jeopardy rules for military service members is if the service member was being tried for the same offense in civilian court. If a civilian court acquits an active duty service member of an offense, a court-martial can still be convened against the service member for the same offense under the provisions of the UCMJ. This is based on the "dual sovereigns" doctrine that holds that the civilian and military justice systems are completely distinct from each other and therefore are treated the same way as the distinction between state and federal courts or US and foreign courts would be for double jeopardy purposes.

The most famous American court case invoking the claim of double jeopardy is probably the second murder trial in 1876 of Jack McCall, killer of Wild Bill Hickok. McCall was acquitted in his first trial, which Federal authorities later ruled to be illegal because it took place in an illegal town, Deadwood, then located in South Dakota Indian Territory. At the time, Federal law prohibited all except Native Americans from settling in the Indian Territory. McCall was retried in Federal Indian Territorial court, convicted, and hanged in 1877. He was the first person executed by Federal authorities in the Dakota Territory.

Double jeopardy also does not apply if the defendant was never tried from the start. Charges that were dropped or put on hold for any reason can always be reinstated in the future—if not barred by some statute of limitations.

=== Insanity defense ===
The "insanity defense" allows a defendant to be acquitted by reason of mental illness. In 2012 in the State of Georgia, Damien McElrath killed his mother and was charged with several offenses under Georgia law: malice murder, felony murder, and aggravated assault. On the malice murder charge, the jury returned a verdict of "not guilty by reason of insanity", but returned "guilty but mentally ill" on the felony murder and aggravated assault charges. The Supreme Court of Georgia vacated all verdicts as repugnant and authorized retrial.

McElrath argued the "not guilty by reason of insanity" verdict is an acquittal that prohibited Georgia from retrying McElrath on the malice murder charge. The Supreme Court of the United States agreed, ruling that "not guilty by reason of insanity" is an acquittal:

For double jeopardy purposes, a jury's determination that a defendant is not guilty by reason of insanity is a conclusion that "criminal culpability had not been established," just as much as any other form of acquittal. Burks v. United States, 437 U. S. 1, 10 (1978). Such a verdict reflects "that the Government ha[s] failed to come forward with sufficient proof of [a defendant's] capacity to be responsible for criminal acts."

That all verdicts returned by the jury were ruled "repugnant" by the Supreme Court of Georgia was immaterial. The Supreme Court reiterated its long-standing precedent that an acquittal cannot be second-guessed by any Court, so the Supreme Court of Georgia's ruling to vacate the acquittal was void. The Court did not rule on the status of the "guilty but mentally ill" charges, leaving that up to the Georgia courts to ultimately decide.

== Incorporation ==
Although the Fifth Amendment initially applied only to the federal government, the U.S. Supreme Court has ruled that the double jeopardy clause applies to the states as well through incorporation by the Fourteenth Amendment. In Fong Foo v. United States (1962), the Supreme Court applied freedom from double jeopardy to corporations.

== Dual sovereignty doctrine ==
The double jeopardy clause does not generally protect a person from being prosecuted by both a state government and the United States federal government for the same act, nor does it protect a person from being prosecuted by multiple states for the same act. Because American law considers each of the state governments to be distinct from the federal government of the United States as a whole, with its own laws, court systems, and sovereignty, these parallel prosecutions are considered to be different "offenses" under the double jeopardy clause, and the decisions of one government on what to prosecute or not prosecute are not considered to be binding upon the other. This is known as the "dual sovereignty" or "separate sovereigns" doctrine.

The earliest case at the Supreme Court of the United States to address the matter is Fox v. Ohio in 1847, in which the petitioner, Malinda Fox, was appealing a conviction of a state crime of passing a counterfeit silver dollar. The power to coin money is granted exclusively to Congress, and it was argued that Congress's power precludes the power of any state from prosecuting any crimes pertaining to the money, an argument the Supreme Court rejected in upholding Fox's conviction.

A case that followed on Fox is United States v. Cruikshank, in which the Supreme Court stated that the government of the United States is a separate sovereign from any state:

This does not, however, necessarily imply that the two governments possess powers in common, or bring them into conflict with each other. It is the natural consequence of a citizenship which owes allegiance to two sovereignties, and claims protection from both. The citizen cannot complain, because he has voluntarily submitted himself to such a form of government. He owes allegiance to the two departments, so to speak, and within their respective spheres must pay the penalties which each exacts for disobedience to its laws. In return, he can demand protection from each within its own jurisdiction.

In 1920 the United States was fresh into the Prohibition Era. In one prosecution that occurred in Washington State, a defendant named Lanza was charged under a Washington statute and simultaneously under a United States statute, with the federal indictment stating several facts also stated in the Washington indictment. The Supreme Court addressed the question of the federal government and a state government having separate prosecutions on the same facts in United States v. Lanza:

We have here two sovereignties, deriving power from different sources, capable of dealing with the same subject matter within the same territory. Each may, without interference by the other, enact laws to secure prohibition, with the limitation that no legislation can give validity to acts prohibited by the amendment. Each government in determining what shall be an offense against its peace and dignity is exercising its own sovereignty, not that of the other. It follows that an act denounced as a crime by both national and state sovereignties is an offense against the peace and dignity of both and may be punished by each. The Fifth Amendment, like all the other guaranties in the first eight amendments, applies only to proceedings by the federal government (Barron v. City of Baltimore, 7 Pet. 243), and the double jeopardy therein forbidden is a second prosecution under authority of the federal government after a first trial for the same offense under the same authority. (The Barron precedent was superseded 35 years later by the 14th Amendment)

This separation of sovereignty is seen with the separate federal and state trials of convicted Oklahoma City bombing co-conspirator Terry Nichols. Terry Nichols and Timothy McVeigh were tried and convicted in federal court, with Nichols sentenced to life in prison with no possibility of parole, and McVeigh sentenced to death and later executed. While the building was owned by the federal government, serving as branch locations for multiple federal agencies, the federal government had criminal jurisdiction only over 8 of the 168 confirmed deaths. With the express intent of seeing Nichols also sentenced to death, while contemplating the same for McVeigh if his death sentence was overturned on appeal, the State of Oklahoma filed charges against Terry Nichols.

There may also be federal laws that call other facts into question beyond the scope of any state law. A state may try a defendant for murder, after which the federal government might try the same defendant for a federal crime (perhaps a civil rights violation or a kidnapping) connected to the same act. The officers of the Los Angeles Police Department who were charged with assaulting Rodney King in 1991 were acquitted by a jury of the Superior Courts of California, but some were later convicted and sentenced in federal court for violating King's civil rights. Similar legal processes were used for prosecuting racially motivated crimes in the Southern United States in the 1960s during the time of the Civil Rights Movement, when those crimes had not been actively prosecuted, or had resulted in acquittals by juries that were thought to be racist or overly sympathetic with the accused in local courts.

Federal jurisdiction may apply because the defendant is a member of the armed forces or the victims are armed forces members or dependents. U.S. Army Master Sergeant Timothy B. Hennis was acquitted on retrial in North Carolina for the 1985 murders of Kathryn Eastburn (31 years old) and her daughters, Kara (5 years old) and Erin (3 years old), stabbed to death in their home near Fort Bragg, North Carolina. Two decades later, Hennis was recalled to active duty, court-martialed by the Army for the crime, convicted, and sentenced again to death. Richard Dieter, executive director of the Death Penalty Information Center, observed of this case, "Certainly, no one [in the US] has been exonerated and then returned to death row for the same crime except Hennis." Hennis challenged jurisdiction under the Double Jeopardy Clause on appeal to the United States Army Court of Criminal Appeals, which rejected the challenge.

Furthermore, as ruled in Heath v. Alabama, the "separate sovereigns" rule allows two states to prosecute for the same criminal act. For example, if a man stood in New York and shot and killed a man standing over the border in Connecticut, both New York and Connecticut could charge the shooter with murder.

In order for a state to have jurisdiction to prosecute a criminal act, either the action directly resulting in consequences such as death or injury must occur while the perpetrator is in the state or the consequences must occur in the state. For example, if a man piloting an airplane took off from New York, flew to Connecticut and while flying over Connecticut committed a murder by dropping something from the aircraft, the only two sovereigns able to prosecute would be Connecticut and the federal government (due to the murder taking place from an aircraft) – New York would lack jurisdiction since no criminal act would have been perpetrated from there. But if the same man while still in New York remotely piloted a drone using the cellular network and used that vehicle to commit the murder in Connecticut, then three separate sovereigns could prosecute the murder (New York, Connecticut and the federal government due to the use of the unmanned aircraft as well as interstate telecommunications).

Only the states and tribal jurisdictions are recognized as possessing a separate sovereignty, whereas territories of the United States, the military and naval forces, and the capital city of Washington, D.C., are exclusively under federal sovereignty. Acquittal in the court system of any of these entities would therefore preclude a re-trial (or a court-martial) in any court system under federal jurisdiction.

The dual sovereignty nature of the Double Jeopardy Clause was reheard as part of Gamble v. United States, decided in June 2019. The Supreme Court upheld the nature of dual sovereignty between federal and state charges in a 7–2 decision.

=== Petite policy ===
Though the Supreme Court of the United States has recognized the dual sovereignty doctrine as an exception to double jeopardy, the United States will not exercise its dual sovereignty power on everyone who becomes subject to it. As a self-imposed limitation on its dual sovereignty power, the United States Department of Justice has a policy called the Petite policy, named after Petite v. United States. The formal name of the policy is "Dual and Successive Prosecution Policy" and it "establishes guidelines for the exercise of discretion by appropriate officers of the Department of Justice in determining whether to bring a federal prosecution based on substantially the same act(s) or transactions involved in a prior state or federal proceeding."

Under this policy, the Department of Justice presumes that any prosecution at the state level for any fact applicable to any federal charge vindicates any federal interest in those facts, even if the outcome is an acquittal. As an example, a person who commits murder within the jurisdiction of a state is subject to that state's murder statute and the United States murder statute (18 U.S.C. § 1111). The federal government will defer to the state to prosecute under their statute. Whatever the outcome of the trial, acquittal or conviction, the Department of Justice will presume that prosecution to vindicate any federal interest and will not initiate prosecution under the United States Code.

However that presumption can be overcome. The policy stipulates five criteria that may overcome that presumption (particularly for an acquittal at the state level):

1. incompetence, corruption, intimidation, or undue influence
2. court or jury nullification in clear disregard of the evidence or the law
3. the unavailability of significant evidence, either because it was not timely discovered or known by the prosecution, or because it was kept from the trier of fact's consideration because of an erroneous interpretation of the law
4. the failure in a prior state prosecution to prove an element of a state offense that is not an element of the contemplated federal offense
5. the exclusion of charges in a prior federal prosecution out of concern for fairness to other defendants, or for significant resource considerations that favored separate federal prosecutions

The presumption may be overcome even when a conviction was achieved in the prior prosecution in the following circumstances:

1. If the prior sentence was manifestly inadequate in light of the federal interest involved and a substantially enhanced sentence—including forfeiture and restitution as well as imprisonment and fines—is available through the contemplated federal prosecution, or
2. If the choice of charges, or the determination of guilt, or the severity of sentence in the prior prosecution was affected by the sorts of factors listed in the previous list. An example might be a case in which the charges in the initial prosecution trivialized the seriousness of the contemplated federal offense, for example, a state prosecution for assault and battery in a case involving the murder of a federal official.

The presumption also may be overcome, irrespective of the result in a prior state prosecution, in those rare cases where the following three conditions are met:

1. The alleged violation involves a compelling federal interest, particularly one implicating an enduring national priority.
2. The alleged violation involves egregious conduct, including that which threatens or causes loss of life, severe economic or physical harm, or the impairment of the functioning of an agency of the federal government or the due administration of justice, and
3. The result in the prior prosecution was manifestly inadequate in light of the federal interest involved.

The existence of any of these criteria is to be determined by an Assistant Attorney General of the United States. If a prosecution is determined to have proceeded without authorization, the federal government may and has requested the Court vacate an indictment. Such a move is in line with the Courts vacating indictments wherein prosecutions were discovered to have violated Department of Justice policy. Indictments have also been vacated when the federal government first represents to the Court the prosecution was authorized but later determines that authorization to have been mistaken.
