= Serfass v. United States =

- Supreme Court of the United States

Decided March 3, 1975
- Full case name: Serfass v. United States
- Citations: 420 U.S. 377 (more)

Holding
- The Double Jeopardy Clause does not prohibit an appeal by the government of a pretrial dismissal because the criminal defendant has yet not been put in jeopardy by a trial.

Court membership
- Chief Justice Warren E. Burger Associate Justices William O. Douglas · William J. Brennan Jr. Potter Stewart · Byron White; Thurgood Marshall · Harry Blackmun; Lewis F. Powell Jr. · William Rehnquist

Case opinions
- Majority: Burger
- Dissent: Douglas

Laws applied
- Double Jeopardy Clause

Serfass v. United States, 420 U.S. 377 (1975), was a United States Supreme Court case in which the court held that the Double Jeopardy Clause does not prohibit an appeal by the government of a pretrial dismissal because the criminal defendant has yet not been put in jeopardy by a trial.

== Background ==
Serfass, who had submitted a post-induction order claim for conscientious objector status to his local board, was later indicted for willful failure to report for and submit to induction into the Armed Forces. He filed a pretrial motion to dismiss the indictment on the ground that the local board did not state adequate reasons for refusing to reopen his file, an affidavit supporting that motion, and a motion to postpone the trial "for the reason that a Motion to Dismiss has been simultaneously filed, and the expeditious administration of justice will be served best by considering the Motion prior to trial."

The federal District Court dismissed the indictment, noting that the material facts were derived from the affidavit, Serfass's Selective Service file, and a stipulation that the information Serfass had submitted to the board "establishes a prima facie claim for conscientious objector status based upon late crystallization." The court held that dismissal of the indictment was appropriate because Serfass was entitled to full consideration of his claim before he was assigned to combatant training and because the local board's statement of reasons for its refusal to reopen petitioner's file was "sufficiently ambiguous to be reasonably construed as a rejection on the merits, thereby prejudicing his right to in service review." The Government appealed under 18 U.S.C. § 3731. The Third Circuit Court of Appeals, rejecting Serfass's contention that it lacked jurisdiction under § 3731 because the Double Jeopardy Clause barred further prosecution, reversed.

== Opinion of the court ==
The Supreme Court issued an opinion on March 3, 1975.

== See also ==
- Crist v. Bretz
