= California v. Texas (1978) =

- Supreme Court of the United States

Argued March 29, 1978 Decided June 22, 1978
- Full case name: California v. Texas
- Citations: 437 U.S. 601 (more)

Court membership
- Chief Justice Warren E. Burger Associate Justices William J. Brennan Jr. · Potter Stewart; Byron White · Thurgood Marshall; Harry Blackmun · Lewis F. Powell Jr. William Rehnquist · John P. Stevens

Case opinions
- Per curiam
- Concurrence: Stewart
- Concurrence: Powell
- Concurrence: Stevens
- Concurrence: Brennan

California v. Texas, 437 U.S. 601 (1978) is a Supreme Court case regarding the jurisdiction of Howard Hughes' estate taxes.
