= Oregon v. Kennedy =

- Supreme Court of the United States

Argued March 29, 1982 Decided May 24, 1982
- Full case name: Oregon v. Kennedy
- Docket no.: 80-1991
- Citations: 456 U.S. 667 (more) 102 S. Ct. 2083; 72 L. Ed. 2d 416

Holding
- A criminal defendant who successfully moves for a mistrial may only invoke the bar of double jeopardy in a second effort to try him if the conduct giving rise to the motion for a mistrial was prosecutorial or judicial conduct intended to provoke the defendant into moving for a mistrial.

Court membership
- Chief Justice Warren E. Burger Associate Justices William J. Brennan Jr. · Byron White; Thurgood Marshall · Harry Blackmun; Lewis F. Powell Jr. · William Rehnquist; John P. Stevens · Sandra Day O'Connor

Case opinions
- Majority: Rehnquist, joined by Burger, White, Powell, O'Connor
- Concurrence: Brennan, joined by Marshall
- Concurrence: Powell
- Concurrence: Stevens, joined by Brennan, Marshall, Blackmun

Laws applied
- Double Jeopardy Clause of the U.S. Const. Amend. V

Oregon v. Kennedy, 456 U.S. 667 (1982), was a United States Supreme Court decision dealing with the appropriate test for determining whether a criminal defendant has been "goaded" by the prosecution's bad actions into motioning for a mistrial. This matters because the answer determines whether a defendant can be retried. Ordinarily, a defendant who requests a mistrial can be forced to stand trial a second time, see United States v. Dinitz. However, if the prosecution's conduct was "intended to provoke the defendant into moving for a mistrial," double jeopardy protects the defendant from retrial. The Court emphasized that only prosecutorial actions where the intent is to provoke a mistrial — and not mere "harassment" or "overreaching" — trigger the double jeopardy protection.

== Background ==
Kennedy was charged with stealing an oriental rug. During the first trial, the State of Oregon called as a witness an expert on Middle Eastern rugs who could testify as to the value and the identity of the rug in question. The prosecutor had the following exchange with the witness:

"Prosecutor: Have you ever done business with the Kennedys?"

"Witness: No, I have not."

"Prosecutor: Is that because he is a crook?"

Based on this exchange, Kennedy moved for a mistrial, and the trial judge granted the motion. When the state then attempted to retry Kennedy, he moved to dismiss the charges because of double jeopardy.

The Oregon Court of Appeals found in Kennedy's favor. The Court of Appeals ruled that the prosecution had not meant to force a mistrial, but still sided with Kennedy because it viewed the prosecution as "overreaching."

== Opinion of the Court ==
The Supreme Court then rejected the standard used by the Court of Appeals, stressing that only "conduct intended to provoke the defendant into moving for a mistrial" would protect a defendant from a second trial following a mistrial.

== See also ==
- List of United States Supreme Court cases
- List of United States Supreme Court cases, volume 456
