= Burks v. United States =

- Supreme Court of the United States

Argued November 28, 1977 Decided June 14, 1978
- Full case name: David Wayne Burks, Petitioner, v. United States
- Citations: 437 U.S. 1 (more) 98 S. Ct. 2141; 57 L. Ed. 2d 1; 1978 U.S. LEXIS 3
- Argument: Oral argument
- Opinion announcement: Opinion announcement

Case history
- Prior: United States v. Burks, 547 F.2d 968 (6th Cir. 1976); cert. granted, 431 U.S. 964 (1977).

Holding
- The Double Jeopardy Clause of the Fifth Amendment precludes a second trial once the reviewing court has found the evidence insufficient to sustain the jury's verdict of guilty.

Court membership
- Chief Justice Warren E. Burger Associate Justices William J. Brennan Jr. · Potter Stewart; Byron White · Thurgood Marshall; Harry Blackmun · Lewis F. Powell Jr. William Rehnquist · John P. Stevens

Case opinion
- Majority: Burger, joined by Brennan, Stewart, White, Marshall, Powell, Rehnquist, and Stevens
- Blackmun took no part in the consideration or decision of the case.

Laws applied
- U.S. Const. amend. V

Burks v. United States, 437 U.S. 1 (1978), was a United States Supreme Court case in which the court clarified both the scope of protection against double jeopardy provided by the Fifth Amendment to the United States Constitution and the limits of an appellate court's discretion to fashion a remedy under section 2106 of Title 28 of the United States Code. It established the constitutional rule that where an appellate court reverses a criminal conviction on the ground that the prosecution failed to present sufficient evidence to prove the defendant's guilt beyond a reasonable doubt, the Double Jeopardy Clause shields the defendant from a second prosecution for the same offense. Notwithstanding the power that appellate courts have under section 2106 to "remand the cause and direct the entry of such appropriate judgment, decree, or order, or require such further proceedings to be had as may be just under the circumstances," the court held that an appellate court that reverses a conviction for insufficiency of evidence may not allow the lower court a choice on remand between acquitting the defendant and ordering a new trial. It held that the "only 'just' remedy" in such a situation was to order an acquittal.

== Background ==
Defendant David Wayne Burks pled not guilty by reason of insanity to a charge of armed bank robbery under 18 U.S.C. § 2113(d). To support this insanity defense at his jury trial in the District Court for the Middle District of Tennessee, he called as expert witnesses two psychiatrists and a psychologist. They diagnosed him differently but all testified that he "suffered from a mental illness at the time of the robbery, which rendered him substantially incapable of conforming his conduct to the requirements of the law."

To rebut Burks' evidence of insanity, the prosecutor called two expert witnesses as well as lay witnesses. One of the expert witnesses opined that Burks had a "character disorder," but was not mentally ill. Although the other expert agreed that a character disorder afflicted Burks, he "gave a rather ambiguous answer to the question of whether Burks had been capable of conforming his conduct to the law." The lay witnesses, including police officers and a cab driver whose taxi had been taken by Burks at gun point, testified that Burks "seemed sane" at the time. Another lay witness, Burks' work supervisor, testified that Burks had once told him "a bizarre story of a room with cameras all around '... and blowing somebody's brains out and having a picture of it.'"

After each side presented its case, Burks moved for a judgment of acquittal, arguing that the government's evidence was insufficient to prove his guilt. The court denied the motion and submitted the case to the jury, which found him guilty. He received a twenty-year sentence. At that point, he moved for a new trial, renewing his insufficiency-of-the-evidence argument. Again, the district court denied his motion.

Burks appealed to the United States Court of Appeals for the Sixth Circuit seeking a reversal of his conviction. He conceded that he had held up the bank, but maintained that he was insane when he did so and that the government had failed to prove otherwise. The Sixth Circuit agreed that the government's evidence was insufficient to prove Burks' sanity (and, accordingly, his criminal responsibility) beyond a reasonable doubt. Having made this threshold determination, the Sixth Circuit reasoned that "[s]ince Burks made a motion for a new trial," it had "discretion in determining the course to direct on remand" under 28 U.S.C. § 2106. It then instructed the district court to choose between entering a directed verdict of acquittal or ordering a new trial. To guide the lower court in this decision, the Sixth Circuit advised it to consider whether the government could present additional evidence sufficient to justify a new trial, but also gave the court discretion to acquit Burks if fairness demanded that result:

[T]he defendant will be entitled to a directed verdict of acquittal unless the government presents sufficient additional evidence to carry its burden on the issue of defendant's sanity. . . . Even if the government presents additional evidence, the district judge may refuse to order a new trial if he finds from the record that the prosecution had the opportunity fully to develop its case or in fact did so at the first trial.

Burks and the government both filed petitions for rehearing in the Sixth Circuit, which were denied. The Supreme Court granted Burks' petition for a writ of certiorari.

=== Double Jeopardy Clause ===
The Double Jeopardy Clause of the Fifth Amendment to the United States Constitution provides that: "...nor shall any person be subject for the same offense to be twice put in jeopardy of life or limb". The clause is intended to "protect an individual from being subjected to the hazards of trial and possible conviction more than once for an alleged offense." An acquittal triggers this protection. The Supreme Court stated in United States v. Scott (1978) that retrial following an acquittal would "subject[ the defendant] to embarrassment, expense and ordeal and compel[] him to live in a continuing state of anxiety and insecurity" and that:

The law attaches particular significance to an acquittal. To permit a second trial after an acquittal, however mistaken the acquittal may have been, would present an unacceptably high risk that the Government, with its vastly superior resources, might wear down the defendant, so that "even though innocent, he may be found guilty."

=== Question ===
The Supreme Court chose to answer the question of "whether a defendant may be tried a second time when a reviewing court has determined that in a prior trial the evidence was insufficient to sustain the verdict of the jury."

== Opinion ==
The 8–0 majority opinion was written by Chief Justice Warren E. Burger, joined by Justices William J. Brennan Jr., Potter Stewart, Byron White, Thurgood Marshall, Lewis F. Powell Jr., William Rehnquist, and John Paul Stevens, while Justice Harry Blackmun did not participate in the consideration or decision of the case. Burger held that a defendant may not be tried a second time when an appellate court reverses their conviction because the evidence at trial was insufficient to support a guilty verdict and that that appellate court must order an acquittal. He also stated that a retrial was permissible where the reviewing court reversed a conviction for trial error.

Burger first reviewed the relevant precedent. In 1950, the Supreme Court had rejected Burks' argument in Bryan v. United States, holding that the Double Jeopardy Clause posed no bar to retrying a defendant who had unsuccessfully moved the trial court for a judgment of acquittal and, alternatively, a new trial, but whose conviction was reversed for insufficiency of evidence by an appellate court. In Sapir v. United States (1955), the court had issued a single-paragraph per curiam opinion vacating an order that directed a new trial under similar factual circumstances to Bryan while not explaining its rationale. However, Justice William O. Douglas wrote a concurring opinion distinguishing Sapir from Bryan on the ground that Bryan had asked for a new trial and had therefore "open[ed] the whole record for such disposition as might be just." Then, in Yates v. United States (1957), the court had ordered new trials for some defendants and acquittals for others, stating that there was "no doubt" that it was "justified in refusing to order acquittal even where the evidence might be deemed palpably insufficient, particularly since petitioners have asked in the alternative for a new trial as well as for acquittal." Finally, the Court had held in Forman v. United States (1960) that a new trial following a reversal, no matter the grounds, never constituted double jeopardy: "It is elementary in our law that a person can be tried a second time for an offense when his prior conviction for that same offense has been set aside by his appeal."

Burger criticized the Bryan–Forman line of decisions for a lack of consistency and clarity, but read them to mean that "a defendant who requests a new trial as one avenue of relief may be required to stand trial again, even when his conviction was reversed due to failure of proof at the first trial." He therefore acknowledged that because Burks had appealed from the district court's denial of his motion for new trial, following the Bryan–Forman line would allow the option for a new trial upon reversal. Burger, however, departed from that line, stating that "it should make no difference that the reviewing court, rather than the trial court, determined the evidence to be insufficient" and that the Double Jeopardy Clause barred retrial in both cases.

Burger provided the following justifications for the new rule and his rejection of precedent as well as of the Sixth Circuit's equitable remedy:

- That "where the Double Jeopardy Clause is applicable, its sweep is absolute," such that "[t]here are no 'equities' to be balanced," and the "constitutional policy" that the clause declares is "not open to judicial examination";
- That Bryan's reliance on United States v. Ball (1896) was misplaced because that case established merely that retrial after reversal for trial error does not violate the Double Jeopardy Clause; and
- Avoidance of the "purely arbitrary distinction between those in petitioner's position and others who would enjoy the benefit of a correct decision by the [trial] court."

Burger also argued that the Double Jeopardy Clause permitted a second prosecution following reversal for trial error, such as flawed jury instructions, evidentiary rulings, or prosecutorial misconduct. He wrote that "it would be a high price indeed for society to pay were every accused granted immunity from punishment because of any defect sufficient to constitute reversible error in the proceedings leading to conviction" because a trial error "implies nothing with respect to the guilt or innocence of the defendant." He stated that where trial error occurs, a defendant "has a strong interest in obtaining a fair readjudication of his guilt free from error, just as society maintains a valid concern for insuring that the guilty are punished." He then stated that the situation was not the same following a reversal for insufficiency of the evidence, where the prosecution had already had "one fair opportunity to offer whatever proof it could assemble." He noted especially a reviewing court had a high standard to reverse a conviction on the grounds of insufficiency of the evidence, as it "must sustain the verdict if there is substantial evidence, viewed in the light most favorable to the Government, to uphold the jury's decision." He argued that the "prosecution's failure [would be] clear" in cases where a reviewing court held otherwise.

Burger rejected the argument that a defendant waived the right against double jeopardy by asking for a new trial. He also disagreed with the Sixth Circuit and Yates that 28 U.S.C. § 2106 authorized a reviewing court to order retrial in such circumstances because the Double Jeopardy Clause forbade retrial once such a court had ruled in favor of the defendant on the sufficiency issue. As such, the only "just" remedy within the meaning of § 2106 was to order the lower court to acquit.

== Subsequent developments and legacy ==
Soon after Burks came down, an article observed that the court's rule was ambiguous with respect to cases where a trial error affected the sufficiency of the evidence:

One example of a trial error having an effect on the sufficiency of the evidence is the situation where the trial court has erroneously excluded evidence for the prosecution without which the rest of the evidence is legally insufficient to support the conviction. Another example is where the trial court has erroneously admitted evidence for the prosecution and on appeal it is determined first, that the evidence should not have been received by the trial court, and second, that without such evidence the prosecution's case is palpably insufficient and will not support the conviction. Although these issues were not addressed directly in Burks, the Court intimated that such infirmities are to be treated as trial errors.

In Lockhart v. Nelson (1988), the court answered this question. In a 6–3 majority opinion written by Chief Justice William Rehnquist, it held that retrial is constitutionally permissible if a reviewing court sets aside a conviction because the lower court erroneously accepted prosecution evidence without which there was insufficient proof to sustain the conviction. He argued that because a trial court considers all evidence admitted in deciding whether to grant a motion for acquittal, a reviewing court must do the same and that in Nelson's case the sum of the evidence admitted at trial adequately supported the conviction. Justice Thurgood Marshall, joined by Justices William J. Brennan Jr. and Harry Blackmun, dissented, stating that "if, in seeking to prove Nelson's four prior convictions, the State had offered documented evidence to prove three valid prior convictions and a blank piece of paper to prove a fourth, no one would doubt that [the government] had produced insufficient evidence and that the Double Jeopardy Clause barred retrial. There is no constitutionally significant difference between that hypothetical and this case."

In Evans v. Michigan (2013), the court held in an 8–1 majority opinion written by Justice Sonia Sotomayor that where the trial court had granted the defendant's motion for a directed verdict of acquittal on the ground that the prosecution failed to prove a fact that it mistakenly believed to be an element of the offense, retrial was prohibited. The court cited Burks for its holding that the prohibition against double jeopardy applied if the "'bottom-line' question of criminal culpability" had been resolved against the prosecution.

In Bravo-Fernandez v. United States (2016), the court cited Burks for the rule that "a court's evaluation of the evidence as insufficient to convict is equivalent to an acquittal and therefore bars a second prosecution for the same offense," but unanimously held in an opinion by Justice Ruth Bader Ginsburg that that this rule did not apply where the reviewing court vacated defendants' convictions because the lower court's jury instructions were legally erroneous.

In Nelson v. Colorado (2017), the court held by a 6–1 majority opinion written by Justice Ginsburg (Justice Samuel Alito concurred only in the judgment and Justice Neil Gorsuch took no part in the consideration or decision of the case) that due process prohibited Colorado from requiring individuals whose convictions had been reversed or vacated to prove their innocence before the state would reimburse them for costs, fees, and restitution payments ordered as part of their convictions on the grounds that if a trial court had set aside a guilty verdict for want of evidence, the state would have no claim to those individuals' property. Quoting Burks, Ginsburg asserted that "it should make no difference that the reviewing court, rather than the trial court, determined the evidence to be insufficient."
