= Criminal Evidence (Witness Anonymity) Act 2008 =

Public General Act of Parliament of the United Kingdom

- Act of Parliament
- Parliament of the United Kingdom
- Long title: An Act to make provision for the making of orders for securing the anonymity of witnesses in criminal proceedings.
- Citation: 2008 c. 15
- Introduced by: Jack Straw
- Territorial extent: England and Wales and Northern Ireland (civilian law); United Kingdom (military law)

Dates
- Royal assent: 21 July 2008
- Commencement: 21 July 2008

Status: Partially repealed

History of passage through Parliament

Text of statute as originally enacted

The Criminal Evidence (Witness Anonymity) Act 2008 (c. 15) was an act of the Parliament of the United Kingdom. It was a piece of emergency legislation and was introduced by the Secretary of State for Justice, Jack Straw, in order to overturn the judgement of the House of Lords in R v Davis and permit the use of anonymous witnesses in criminal trials in special circumstances.

== Provisions ==
The Act abolished the existing common law rules on anonymity of witnesses and replaced them with a framework in which witness anonymity orders would be granted by the Court on the application of the prosecutor or defendant. Section 2 of the Act set out the terms which could be included in such orders, such as withholding of identity, protection from certain types of questioning, and also authorises visual screening of the witness from the defendant (but not from the judge, jury or any interpreter required by the witness). Section 4 set out the conditions which had to be satisfied before an anonymity order could be made; they were

- A: That the order is necessary to protect the witness, prevent serious damage to property or real harm to the public interest;
- B: That the provisions of the order are consistent with the defendant receiving a fair trial; and
- C: The interests of justice require that it is important that the witness testifies, and that the witness would not testify if the order were not made.

The Act contained a sunset clause which stated that the Act would expire on 31 December 2009 (although Parliament could authorise extensions of 12 months at a time). This was because of the emergency nature of the bill, and because Parliament was already expected to debate a new criminal justice bill before the Act expired, in which further attention was to be given to the law on anonymous witnesses.

The Act was replaced by sections 86 to 97 of the Coroners and Justice Act 2009. Section 96 repealed most of the 2008 Act. These sections came into force on 1 January 2010.

== Criticism ==
Geoffrey Robertson, QC argued that the Act was a "perjurer's charter," describing the proposed changes as "the most serious single assault on liberty in memory." He wrote

Defendants could be imprisoned for life solely on secret evidence they can never test by cross-examination so as to reveal, for example, a witness's malice or personal animosity; spiteful or score-settling motives; a reputation for telling lies or devious relationships with the police.

He further argued that Jack Straw's statement that the Bill conformed with the European Convention on Human Rights was incorrect:

It does not: [A]rticle six of the [C]onvention says that "everyone charged with a criminal offence" has, at minimum, a right "to examine or have examined witnesses against him" – and you cannot examine a distorted voice.

== Legislative history ==
R v Davis was decided by the House of Lords on 18 June 2008. The bill to overturn the Lords' judgement was introduced by Justice Secretary Jack Straw on 4 July 2008. The bill received its third reading in the House of Commons on 8 July and a third reading in the House of Lords on 15 July. On 16 July, the Commons approved the Lords Amendments. The bill became effective upon royal assent, which it received on 21 July.
