= United States v. Dinitz =

- Supreme Court of the United States

Argued December 2, 1975 Decided March 8, 1976
- Full case name: United States v. Nathan George Dinitz
- Citations: 424 U.S. 600 (more) 96 S. Ct. 1075; 47 L. Ed. 2d 267

Case history
- Prior: On Writ of certiorari to the United States Court of Appeals for the Fifth Circuit

Holding
- Where a mistrial was granted with the defendant's consent in the absence of bad faith on part of the prosecution or the judge, there is no violation of double jeopardy when the defendant is put on retrial.

Court membership
- Chief Justice Warren E. Burger Associate Justices William J. Brennan Jr. · Potter Stewart; Byron White · Thurgood Marshall; Harry Blackmun · Lewis F. Powell Jr. William Rehnquist · John P. Stevens

Case opinions
- Majority: Stewart, joined by Burger, White, Blackmun, Powell, Rehnquist
- Concurrence: Burger
- Dissent: Brennan, joined by Marshall
- Stevens took no part in the consideration or decision of the case.

Laws applied
- U.S. Const., Amend. V,

United States v. Dinitz, 424 U.S. 600 (1976), was a case in which the Supreme Court of the United States determined that the U.S. Const., Amend. V protection against double jeopardy did not prevent a retrial of a defendant, who had previously requested a mistrial.

== Facts ==
Nathan Dinitz was charged with narcotics offenses in violation of 84 Stat. 1260, 1265, 21 U.S.C. §§ 841(a)(1), 846. Five days before trial, Dinitz retained new lawyer, Wagner, for his defense. Wagner had not been admitted to practice in that court, but on the first day of the trial, the court permitted him to appear pro hac vice. The jury was selected and sworn, and opening statements by counsel began. In the defense's opening statements, Wagner gave improper personal opinions regarding the prosecution's key witness and case. The prosecutor objected, and the judge warned Wagner not to do it again. The judge found it necessary to twice more remind Wagner of the purpose of the opening statement and to instruct him to relate, "the facts that you expect the evidence to show, the admissible evidence." Id. at 603. Wagner, however, continued to present improper arguments. The judge then excluded Wagner from the trial and ordered him to leave the courthouse. The judge asked Meldon, Dinitz's original defense counsel, if he was ready to proceed with trial or whether he would be willing to seek one of three alternative courses - (1) a stay or recess pending application to the Court of Appeals to review the propriety of expelling Wagner, (2) continuation of the trial with prior counsel, or (3) a declaration of a mistrial which would permit the respondent to obtain other counsel. Following the short recess, Meldon moved for a mistrial stating that the Dinitz had reviewed the alternatives and believed that mistrial would be in his best interest. Mistrial was granted without opposition.

== Procedural history ==
Before the retrial, Dinitz moved to dismiss the indictment on the ground that a retrial would violate the Double Jeopardy Clause of the Constitution. The motion was denied. The appellate court took the view that the exclusion of Wagner and the questioning of Meldon left no choice but to move for mistrial. On that basis, the court concluded that the request for mistrial should be ignored and treated as though mistrial was declared over the objection of the defendant. The appellate court held that the Double Jeopardy Clause barred the second trial because there was no "manifest necessity" that another trial be held.

== Analysis of the Court ==
The Double Jeopardy Clause of the Fifth Amendment protects a defendant in a criminal proceeding against multiple punishments or repeated prosecutions for the same offense. Underlying this constitutional safeguard is the belief that:

"the State, with all its resources and power, should not be allowed to make repeated attempts to convict an individual for an alleged offense, thereby subjecting him to embarrassment, expense and ordeal and compelling him to live in a continuing state of anxiety and insecurity, as well as enhancing the possibility that, even though innocent, he may be found guilty."

Since Justice Story's 1824 opinion in United States v. Perez, of whether, under the Double Jeopardy Clause, there can be a new trial after a mistrial has been declared without the defendant's request or consent depends on whether there is a manifest necessity for the mistrial, or the ends of public justice would otherwise be defeated. A motion by the defendant for mistrial is ordinarily assumed to remove any barrier to retrial, absent bad faith on part of the prosecutor of judge. This is because the defendant has a choice to take the chance to go to the first jury and end the dispute, then and there, with an acquittal. The important consideration is whether the defendant retained primary control over the course to be followed in the event of error.

The Double Jeopardy Clause protects a defendant against bad-faith conduct on part of the prosecutor or judge intended to provoke mistrial requests, and thereby, subject defendant to the substantial burdens imposed by multiple prosecutions. But here the judge's banishment of Wagner from the proceedings was not done in bad faith to goad Dinitz into requesting a mistrial or prejudice his changes of an acquittal. Wagner was guilty of improper conduct, which may have justified disciplinary action.

Therefore, the Supreme Court held that the Court of Appeals erred in finding the retrial violated Dinitz's constitutional right not to be twice put in jeopardy.

== See also ==
- List of United States Supreme Court cases, volume 424
- List of United States Supreme Court cases
- Lists of United States Supreme Court cases by volume
- List of United States Supreme Court cases by the Burger Court
