= List of United States Supreme Court cases, volume 437 =

This is a list of all the United States Supreme Court cases from volume 437 of the United States Reports:

Case name	Citation	Date decided
Burks v. United States	437 U.S. 1	1978
Greene v. Massey	437 U.S. 19	1978
Crist v. Bretz	437 U.S. 28	1978
Sanabria v. United States	437 U.S. 54	1978
United States v. Scott	437 U.S. 82	1978
Exxon Corp. v. Maryland	437 U.S. 117	1978
TVA v. Hill	437 U.S. 153	1978
NLRB v. Robbins Tire & Rubber Co.	437 U.S. 214	1978
First Fed. Sav. & Loan Ass'n v. Tax Comm'n	437 U.S. 255	1978
Moorman Mfg. Co. v. Bair	437 U.S. 267	1978
United States v. LaSalle Nat'l Bank	437 U.S. 298	1978
Greyhound Corp. v. Mt. Hood Stages, Inc.	437 U.S. 322	1978
Oppenheimer Fund, Inc. v. Sanders	437 U.S. 340	1978
Owen Equip. & Erection Co. v. Kroger	437 U.S. 365	1978
A common nucleus of operative facts between federal and non-federal claims is not sufficient to establish a federal court's jurisdiction over non-federal claims.
Mincey v. Arizona	437 U.S. 385	1978
The Fourth Amendment does not provide a "murder scene exception" to the warrant-and-probable-cause requirement.
ABC. v. Writers Guild of Am., West, Inc.	437 U.S. 411	1978
Zenith Radio Corp. v. United States	437 U.S. 443	1978
Coopers & Lybrand v. Livesay	437 U.S. 463	1978
Gardner v. Westinghouse Broad. Co.	437 U.S. 478	1978
Beth Israel Hosp. v. NLRB	437 U.S. 483	1978
Hicklin v. Orbeck	437 U.S. 518	1978
Wise v. Lipscomb	437 U.S. 535	1978
Eastex, Inc. v. NLRB	437 U.S. 556	1978
Parker v. Flook	437 U.S. 584	1978
California v. Texas	437 U.S. 601	1978
City of Philadelphia v. New Jersey	437 U.S. 617	1978
United States v. John (1978)	437 U.S. 634	1978
Will v. Calvert Fire Ins. Co.	437 U.S. 655	1978
Hutto v. Finney	437 U.S. 678	1978
