= United States v. Dixon =

- Supreme Court of the United States

Argued December 2, 1992 Decided June 28, 1993
- Full case name: United States v. Alvin Dixon and Michael Foster
- Citations: 509 U.S. 688 (more) 113 S. Ct. 2849; 125 L. Ed. 2d 556; 1993 U.S. LEXIS 4405

Case history
- Prior: Indictments dismissed, 598 A.2d 724 (D.C. 1991); cert. granted, 503 U.S. 1004 (1992).

Holding
- 1. The Double Jeopardy Clause's protection attaches in criminal contempt prosecutions just as in any other criminal case.; 2. Grady v. Corbin is overruled, and the Grady "same-conduct" test is abrogated in favor of the Blockburger "same-elements" test. Subsequent prosecutions for the same underlying conduct are not barred by the Clause if each offense contains an element not contained in the other.

Court membership
- Chief Justice William Rehnquist Associate Justices Byron White · Harry Blackmun; John P. Stevens · Sandra Day O'Connor; Antonin Scalia · Anthony Kennedy; David Souter · Clarence Thomas

Case opinions
- Majority: Scalia (Parts I, II and IV), joined by Rehnquist, O'Connor, Kennedy, Thomas
- Plurality: Scalia (Parts III and V), joined by Kennedy
- Concur/dissent: Rehnquist, joined by O'Connor, Thomas
- Concur/dissent: White, joined by Stevens; Souter (part I)
- Concur/dissent: Blackmun
- Concur/dissent: Souter, joined by Stevens

Laws applied
- U.S. Const. amend. V; Double Jeopardy Clause
- This case overturned a previous ruling or rulings
- Grady v. Corbin (1990)

United States v. Dixon, 509 U.S. 688 (1993), was a decision of the United States Supreme Court concerning double jeopardy. The case overruled Grady v. Corbin (1990) and revived the traditional Blockburger standard. The case held that subsequent convictions for offenses that contained the same elements were violative of the Double Jeopardy Clause.

== Background ==
Alvin Dixon was arrested for murder in the District of Columbia and released on bail, on the condition that he not commit any criminal offense, or he would be held in contempt of court. While awaiting trial, Dixon was arrested and indicted for possession of cocaine with intent to distribute and was found guilty of contempt and sentenced to 180 days in jail. Dixon moved to dismiss this indictment on double jeopardy grounds because he argued that the prosecution was secondary to his first offense.

Michael Foster's wife obtained a civil protection order against him due to domestic attacks. The order required that he not molest, assault, or in any manner threaten or physically abuse her. Later, his wife sought to have him held in contempt for violation of that order. Foster also filed a motion to dismiss, arguing that his double jeopardy rights were violated because his contempt charges arose out of the original prosecution.

== Opinion of the Court ==
The court concluded that the Double Jeopardy Clause prohibited the subsequent prosecutions of Foster for assault and Dixon for possession with intent to distribute cocaine, but did not prohibit the subsequent prosecutions of Foster for threatening to injure another or for assault with intent to kill. Dixon’s case did not apply to the Blockburger test but instead fell under the rules that the civil tribunals will not revise the proceeding of court materials.

== See also ==
- List of United States Supreme Court cases, volume 509
- List of United States Supreme Court cases
- Lists of United States Supreme Court cases by volume
- List of United States Supreme Court cases by the Rehnquist Court
