= Connelly v DPP =

British legal case

R v Connelly
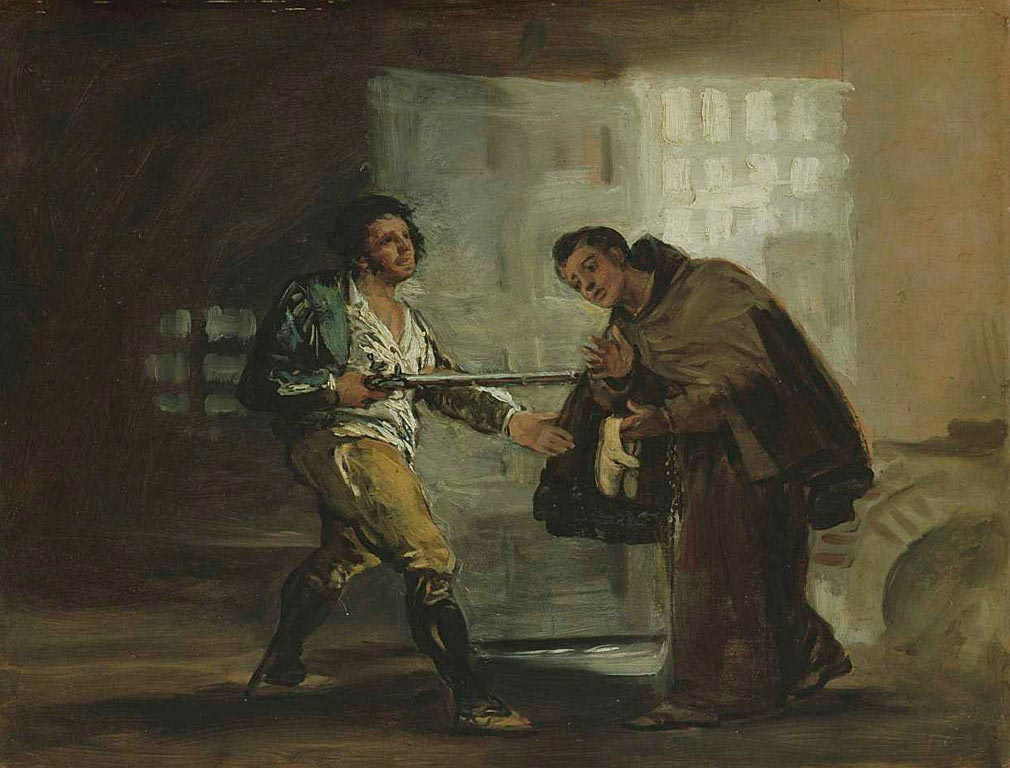
- Court: House of Lords (meaning Judicial Committee of this)
- Full case name: Connelly v Director of Public Prosecution
- Decided: 21 April 1964
- Citation: [1964] AC 1254; [1964] 2 WLR 1145; [1964] 2 All ER 401; 48 Cr App R 183
- Cases cited: R v Norton [1910] 2 KB 496 (applied); R v Chairman, County of London Quarter Sessions, Ex parte Downes [1954] 1 QB 1, DC (followed); rules of practice disapproved in: R v Large (1939) 55 TLR 470 and R v Jones [1918] 1 KB 416; 12 other cases considered
- Legislation cited: Criminal Appeal Act 1907

Case history
- Prior actions: R v Connelly (Crown Court conviction) (unreported); R v Connelly 30 Sep 1963 [1964] AC 1254 (decision in this appeal upheld by House of Lords)
- Subsequent action: None

Court membership
- Judges sitting: Lord Reid, Lord Morris of Borth-y-Gest, Lord Hodson, Lord Devlin, Lord Pearce

Keywords
- quashed conviction; reinstating other charge into fresh indictment; murder; robbery; double jeopardy; estoppel; per rem judicatam

Connelly v DPP [1964] AC 1254 was a landmark appeal whereby the highest court set out the way in which peripheral double jeopardy trials can take place in British law. It was ruled such proceedings should only be stayed where a retrial would be an abuse of process that violated objective standards of fairness and hampered the rights of the defendant. Connelly had been tried for murder, while in the commission of a robbery, and was found guilty despite a defence revolving around a lack of intent for murder. Connelly then appealed to the Court of Appeal, where his conviction was overturned and he was acquitted of murder for lack of proveable intent to kill or cause serious injury at the moment or leading up to the killing and the indictment reduced to robbery. Connelly pleaded autrefois acquit, or double jeopardy, but the argument was rejected and he was able to be convicted of robbery. It is ruled that offences of murder and robbery differ enough in fact and in law" that charges for both offences must together fall or stand. The moral sphere in which law founded demands in that the public interest (and where a custodial or electronic tagging sentence is imposed, a period of enhanced protection of the public) that robbers do not go without a sentence by way of justice.
