= Heath v. Alabama =

- Supreme Court of the United States

Argued October 9, 1985 Decided December 3, 1985
- Full case name: Larry Gene Heath v. Alabama
- Citations: 474 U.S. 82 (more) 106 S. Ct. 433; 88 L. Ed. 2d 387

Case history
- Prior: convicted, Superior Court of Troup County, Georgia, affirmed 456 So.2d 898 (Ala. Crim. App. 1988), affirmed again Ex parte Heath, 455 So.2d 905 (1984).
- Subsequent: Post-conviction proceedings at 536 So. 2d 142 (Ala. Crim. App. 1988); habeas denied, 941 F.2d 1126 (11th Cir. 1991), cert. denied Heath v. Jones, 502 U.S. 1077 (1992); motion to set execution date granted, Heath v. Jones, 601 So. 2d 217 (Ala. 1992).

Holding
- The Fifth Amendment rule against double jeopardy does not prohibit two different states from separately prosecuting and convicting the same individual for the same illegal act.

Court membership
- Chief Justice Warren E. Burger Associate Justices William J. Brennan Jr. · Byron White; Thurgood Marshall · Harry Blackmun; Lewis F. Powell Jr. · William Rehnquist; John P. Stevens · Sandra Day O'Connor

Case opinions
- Majority: O'Connor, joined by Burger, White, Blackmun, Powell, Rehnquist, Stevens
- Dissent: Brennan, joined by Marshall
- Dissent: Marshall, joined by Brennan

Laws applied
- U.S. Const. amends. V, XIV

Heath v. Alabama, 474 U.S. 82 (1985), is a case in which the United States Supreme Court ruled that, because of the doctrine of "dual sovereignty" (the concept that the United States and each state possess sovereignty – a consequence of federalism), the double jeopardy clause of the Fifth Amendment to the Constitution does not prohibit one state from prosecuting and punishing somebody for an act of which they had already been convicted of and sentenced for in another state.

This decision is one of several that holds that the Fifth Amendment does not forbid the U.S. federal government and a state government, or the governments of more than one state, from prosecuting the same individual separately for the same illegal act.

== Background ==
The Fifth Amendment to the Constitution of the United States says:

No person shall be held to answer for a capital, or otherwise infamous crime, unless on a presentment or indictment of a Grand Jury, except in cases arising in the land or naval forces, or in the Militia, when in actual service in time of War or public danger; nor shall any person be subject for the same offence to be twice put in jeopardy of life or limb; nor shall be compelled in any criminal case to be a witness against himself, nor be deprived of life, liberty, or property, without due process of law; nor shall private property be taken for public use, without just compensation.

The clause "nor shall any person be subject for the same offence to be twice put in jeopardy of life or limb" means that the government cannot re-prosecute somebody for a crime of which he or she has been found "not guilty"; likewise, the government cannot appeal against a verdict of acquittal. However, the first ten amendments to the Constitution, known as the Bill of Rights, were originally interpreted as binding only on the Federal government; for example, the First Amendment, which guarantees freedom of religion, expressly begins with the words, "Congress shall make no law . . . ." It was not until the passage of the Fourteenth Amendment, the first section of which says, in part, "No State shall make or enforce any law which shall abridge the privileges or immunities of citizens of the United States; nor shall any State deprive any person of life, liberty, or property, without due process of law; nor deny to any person within its jurisdiction the equal protection of the laws" that any serious consideration was given to the proposition that the Bill of Rights is binding on the states.

Since then, the decisions of the United States Supreme Court have gradually evolved so as to include most state actions within the scope of the Bill of Rights. In Benton v. Maryland, 395 U.S. 784 (1969), the Supreme Court held that the Fifth Amendment prohibition against double jeopardy applies to the states. Nevertheless, each U.S. state has long been considered to have its own sovereignty, which it shares with the U.S. federal government; thus, the question of whether more than one state can punish the same individual for the same set of actions was left open.

== Facts and procedural history ==
In 1981, the defendant, Larry Gene Heath (October 5, 1951 – March 20, 1992), traveled from Russell County, Alabama, to Troup County, Georgia, where he met with two other individuals whom he had hired to kill his pregnant wife Rebecca. They returned with him to his house and, after he left the scene, they kidnapped his wife to Troup County, where they killed her in exchange for $2,000. He was arrested later that year and, on February 10, 1982, pled guilty in a Georgia court to the crime of murder, and was sentenced to life imprisonment.

Subsequently, a grand jury in Alabama, his state of residence, indicted him for the crime of murder during a kidnapping, and he entered a plea of "autrefois convict and former jeopardy under the Alabama and United States Constitutions," by which he stated that he was not eligible to be punished in Alabama because a Georgia court had already convicted and sentenced him for the same crime, and that the crime had, in fact, not taken place in Alabama. The prosecutor argued, however, that because the defendant's wife had been kidnapped in Alabama, the murder "may be punished" there. On January 12, 1983, a jury in the Alabama court convicted Heath of "murder during a kidnapping in the first degree," a capital offense, He was sentenced to death, and the Alabama Court of Criminal Appeals affirmed this decision on direct appeal. The Alabama Supreme Court, after granting certiorari, affirmed the decision of the lower court as well.

The United States Supreme Court then granted certiorari to determine whether the conviction of Heath violated the precedent that had been set by an earlier case, Brown v. Ohio, 432 U.S. 161 (1977), in which the Court had held that one cannot be punished consecutively for two different offenses if the proof of both offenses is identical.

== Decision ==
Writing for a 7–2 majority, Justice O'Connor ruled that "the dual sovereignty doctrine . . . compels the conclusion that successive prosecutions by two States for the same conduct are not barred by the Double Jeopardy Clause." "The dual sovereignty doctrine," she wrote, "is founded on the common-law conception of crime as an offense against the sovereignty of the government. When a defendant in a single act violates the 'peace and dignity' of two sovereigns by breaking the laws of each, he has committed two distinct 'offences.' United States v. Lanza, 260 U.S. 377, 382, 43 S.Ct. 141, 67 L.Ed. 314 (1922)."

When a person commits a crime against the laws of two different states, then the question of whether the states constitute two different sovereigns or just one is determined by whether the state governments "draw their authority to punish the offender from distinct sources of power." Answering the question, Justice O'Connor wrote that the "powers" of state governments "to undertake criminal prosecutions derive from separate and independent sources of power and authority originally belonging to them before admission to the Union and preserved to them by the Tenth Amendment."

The majority opinion concluded that by violating the laws of two different states, the defendant committed separate offenses against each state; for this reason, the Constitutional prohibition on prosecuting or convicting a person "for the same offense" did not apply, and the Court affirmed the defendant's conviction.

== Dissent ==
=== Justice Marshall's dissent ===
Justice Marshall, in a minority opinion, sought to distinguish between the long-held principle that the Fifth Amendment does not prohibit the U.S. federal government and the state governments from separately prosecuting the same individual for the same illegal act, and the majority holding that two separate state governments can do likewise.

In his dissent, he explains that the "dual sovereignty" exception to the double jeopardy clause was designed specifically "to accommodate complementary state and federal concerns within our system of concurrent territorial jurisdictions."

Furthermore, even if the reasoning of the majority was correct, the dual sovereignty doctrine must "not [be used to] legitimate the collusion between Georgia and Alabama in this case to ensure that petitioner is executed for his crime." Specifically, in this case the defendant pleaded guilty in Georgia for the express purpose of avoiding the death penalty; then, he was put on trial in Alabama by a jury in a town where the crime was notorious, and where 75 of 82 prospective jurors were aware that Heath had already pleaded guilty in Georgia. The judge, rather than exclude the jurors who knew that the defendant had already pleaded guilty, simply asked them if they would be able to "put aside their knowledge of the prior guilty plea in order to give petitioner a fair trial in Alabama." It strains credibility that the jurors could remain impartial in spite of their knowledge of the guilty plea. Furthermore, given that the jurors had this knowledge, defense counsel "could do little but attempt to elicit information from prosecution witnesses tending to show that the crime was committed exclusively in Georgia"; any argument tending to show actual innocence would likely be disbelieved by the jury, in spite of the fact that the guilty plea in Georgia was part of a plea bargain, and some defendants, to avoid execution, may plead guilty without actually being guilty.

Justice Marshall also comments that it would, without question, have been unconstitutional if the State of Georgia had decided to re-prosecute Heath on a capital charge because of its dissatisfaction with the life sentence that he had already received. "The only difference between this case and such a hypothetical volte-face by Georgia is that here Alabama, not Georgia, was offended by the notion that petitioner might not forfeit his life in punishment for his crime. The only reason the Court gives for permitting Alabama to go forward is that Georgia and Alabama are separate sovereigns." He then goes on to criticize the majority for its "restrictive" interpretation of the word "offence."

The only reasons why there needs to be a dual-sovereignty exception to the Fifth Amendment prohibition of double jeopardy, argues Marshall, are that

were a prosecution by a State, however zealously pursued, allowed to preclude further prosecution by the Federal Government for the same crime, an entire range of national interests could be frustrated

and that

Conversely, because "the States under our federal system have the principal responsibility for defining and prosecuting crimes," Abbate v. United States, supra, at 195, it would be inappropriate - in the absence of a specific congressional intent to pre-empt state action pursuant to the Supremacy Clause - to allow a federal prosecution to preclude state authorities from vindicating "the historic right and obligation of the States to maintain peace and order within their confines," Bartkus v. Illinois, supra, at 137.

No such "interests" need to be protected when two different states are seeking to prosecute the same offense, and so the underlying reasons behind the "dual-sovereignty" exception to the prohibition against double jeopardy do not apply. Indeed, in 1909 the Supreme Court had held that in case of an incident that occurs on territory subject to "'the one first acquiring jurisdiction of the person may prosecute the offense, and its judgment is a finality in both States, so that one convicted or acquitted in the courts of the one State cannot be prosecuted for the same offense in the courts of the other' Nielsen v. Oregon, 212 U.S. 315, 320 (1909)," (The majority decision of the Court stated that the holding of Nielsen v. Oregon was applicable only to a unique set of circumstances. In Nielsen v. Oregon, two States jointly had jurisdiction over the river that separates them from each other, and one state had prosecuted somebody for an act that was specifically permitted under the laws of the other, and the Court reversed the conviction.)

Finally, Justice Marshall points out that "Even where the power of two sovereigns to pursue separate prosecutions for the same crime has been undisputed, this Court has barred both governments from combining to do what each could not constitutionally do on its own." In this case, the prosecutions in Alabama and Georgia were so inextricably linked that it was as if they were acting together as a single governmental entity. Furthermore, the interests of justice, according to Marshall, were frustrated by having the defendant plead guilty to a crime in Georgia to avoid the death penalty, only to have the guilty plea prevent him from mounting a meaningful defense to capital charges in Alabama. For these reasons, in the interests "of fundamental fairness," Justice Marshall voted against the majority decision.

=== Justice Brennan's dissent ===
Justice Brennan joined Justice Marshall in his dissent, but wrote a separate statement (joined by Justice Marshall), in which he indicated that the "interests" mentioned by Justice Marshall, which would justify allowing Federal and State prosecutions for the same illegal act, are not of a nature that would justify any other exception to the rule that one may not be prosecuted more than once for the same offense.

== Subsequent history ==
The defendant in this case subsequently filed a petition for post-conviction relief in the Alabama state court system, and for a Federal writ of habeas corpus, both of which were denied; he was executed on March 20, 1992.
