= United States v. Felix =

- Supreme Court of the United States

Argued January 14, 1992 Decided March 25, 1992
- Full case name: United States, Petitioner v. Frank Dennis Felix
- Citations: 503 U.S. 378 (more) 112 S.Ct. 1377; 118 L. Ed. 2d 25; 1992 U.S. LEXIS 1954

Case history
- Prior: Motion to dismiss indictment denied, No. 89-16-CR (E.D. Okla. 1989); affirmed in part, reversed and remanded in part, 926 F.2d 1522 (10th Cir. 1991); cert. granted, 502 U.S. 806 (1991).
- Subsequent: Leave to file petition for rehearing denied, 505 U.S. 1239 (1992); affirmed, 964 F.2d 1065 (10th Cir. 1992).

Holding
- The Double Jeopardy Clause does not bar Felix's prosecution on either the substantive drug offenses or the conspiracy charge.

Court membership
- Chief Justice William Rehnquist Associate Justices Byron White · Harry Blackmun; John P. Stevens · Sandra Day O'Connor; Antonin Scalia · Anthony Kennedy; David Souter · Clarence Thomas

Case opinions
- Majority: Rehnquist, joined by White, O'Connor, Scalia, Kennedy, Souter, Thomas
- Concurrence: Stevens, joined by Blackmun

Laws applied
- U.S. Const. amend. V

United States v. Felix, 503 U.S. 378 (1992), was a decision by the United States Supreme Court, which held that "a[n]…offense and a conspiracy to commit that offense are not the same offense for double jeopardy purposes." The Supreme Court rejected the Tenth Circuit's reversal of Felix's conviction, finding that the Court of Appeals read the holding in Grady v. Corbin (1990) too broadly.

== Facts and procedural history ==
In the spring of 1987, the defendant Frank Felix was illegally manufacturing methamphetamine in his Oklahoma facility. The facility was raided and shut down by federal agents in July of the same year where they found and seized precursor materials for methamphetamine production. While still a free man, Felix was arrested a month later by DEA agents conducting an operation in Joplin, Missouri where he was arrested with chemicals and equipment consistently used in the production of methamphetamine. Subsequently, Felix was charged in the United States District Court for the Western District of Missouri and was indicted for attempting to manufacture a controlled substance. At trial Felix presented the defense that "he never had criminal intent, but had the mistaken belief that he was working in a covert DEA operation." Prosecutors then presented evidence of prior acts committed by Felix in Oklahoma to counter his defense. Prosecutors introduced the evidence of the methamphetamine labs from Oklahoma, and the jury convicted Felix for those crimes.

Subsequently, in 1989, the government filed an eleven-count indictment in the United States District Court for the Eastern District of Oklahoma against Felix and other parties for his role in the methamphetamine labs in Oklahoma. This indictment included the substantive charges of manufacturing and possessing methamphetamine with intent to distribute. At trial, prosecutors presented the same evidence from the trial in Missouri. Felix was found guilty on all counts by the jury.

Felix appealed his Oklahoma conviction to the Tenth Circuit where a divided panel ruled in favor of Felix and reversed the ruling. The tenth circuit, relying heavily on Grady v. Corbin, 495 U.S. 508 (1990), held that any subsequent prosecution is barred by the Double Jeopardy Clause, if the government would need to establish an essential element of the offense charged evidenced by conduct of the defendant for which the defendant has already been prosecuted for.

Proceeding the 10th circuit ruling, the government appealed to the Supreme Court where certiorari was granted.

== Decision ==
=== Opinion ===
Chief Justice Rehnquist writing the opinion for the court joined by Justices White, O'Connor, Scalia, Kennedy, Souter, and Thomas. The court focused on two issues; first, whether Double Jeopardy bars prosecution of Felix for the substantial drug offenses contained in the Oklahoma indictment, and second, whether the Double Jeopardy clause bars the prosecution of Felix for the conspiracy charges contained in the Oklahoma indictment. Justice Rehnquist held that The Double Jeopardy Clause does not bar Felix's prosecution on either the substantive drug offenses or the conspiracy charge. The court reasoned that "a mere overlap in proof between two prosecutions does not establish a double jeopardy violation". A relevant fact the court focused on was of both the time and location of Felix's conduct for the two separate indictments. The Oklahoma indictment relied upon the conduct of Felix in regards to the Beggs methamphetamine lab in June and July, while the Missouri indictment focused on Felix's attempt to buy materials to facilitate the methamphetamine operations, two months after the Beggs lab had closed. Thus, the court held that the Court of Appeals erred in their judgement when they extended the "same conduct" test in Grady to mean the "same offense" and invoked the protection of Double Jeopardy. The court drew a distinction between conduct and offense, and reversed the judgement.

=== Concurrence ===
The concurrence was written by Justice Stevens, who was joined by Justice Blackmun in averring from the majority regarding the conspiracy charge. While the majority steps away from Grady, Justice Stevens argues that Grady can still be applied and would still result in the same conclusion. The concurrence reasoned, like the majority, that the double jeopardy clause does not bar the prosecution of Felix, however the interpretation of the "same conduct" test in the Grady dissent was the appropriate interpretation. The dissent in Grady states that when the "same conduct" mentions "conduct to establish an essential element" of the crime, the conduct must constitute the entirety of the element. Justice Stevens argues that double jeopardy does not apply under this reasoning as Felix's two overt acts in both prosecutions do not meaningfully establish the entirety of the element.

== See also ==
- Inchoate offense
- List of United States Supreme Court cases, volume 503
- List of United States Supreme Court cases
- Lists of United States Supreme Court cases by volume
- List of United States Supreme Court cases by the Rehnquist Court
- United States v. Dixon (1993)
