= Grady v. Corbin =

- Supreme Court of the United States

Argued March 21, 1990 Decided May 29, 1990
- Full case name: William V. Grady, District Attorney of Dutchess County v. Thomas J. Corbin
- Citations: 495 U.S. 508 (more) 110 S. Ct. 2084; 109 L. Ed. 2d 548; 1990 U.S. LEXIS 2698

Case history
- Prior: Writ of prohibition granted, Corbin v. Hillery, 74 N.Y.2d 279, 543 N.E.2d 714, 545 N.Y.S.2d 71 (1989); cert. granted, 493 U.S. 953 (1989).

Holding
- The Double Jeopardy Clause bars a subsequent prosecution if, to establish an essential element of an offense charged in that prosecution, the government will prove conduct that constitutes an offense for which the defendant has already been prosecuted.

Court membership
- Chief Justice William Rehnquist Associate Justices William J. Brennan Jr. · Byron White; Thurgood Marshall · Harry Blackmun; John P. Stevens · Sandra Day O'Connor; Antonin Scalia · Anthony Kennedy

Case opinions
- Majority: Brennan, joined by White, Marshall, Blackmun, Stevens
- Dissent: O'Connor
- Dissent: Scalia, joined by Rehnquist, Kennedy

Laws applied
- U.S. Const. amend. V
- Overruled by
- United States v. Dixon, 509 U.S. 688 (1993)

Grady v. Corbin, 495 U.S. 508 (1990), was a United States Supreme Court decision holding that: "the Double Jeopardy Clause bars a subsequent prosecution if, to establish an essential element of an offense charged in that prosecution, the government will prove conduct that constitutes an offense for which the defendant has already been prosecuted."

== Background ==
In the fall of 1987, Thomas Corbin was driving under the influence as he drove his automobile across the center line of a New York highway and collided with two oncoming vehicles. Brenda Dirago, the driver of the second vehicle, died in this accident while her husband was seriously injured. Later that same day, Corbin was charged with DUI and pleaded guilty.

== Opinion of the Court ==
In an opinion by Justice Brennan, the Supreme Court ruled that to subsequently try him for homicide would constitute double jeopardy.

== Aftermath ==
Grady was only valid law for three years. It was overturned by United States v. Dixon, which rejected the same conduct test in favor of the longstanding same element test. The same element test had been the law since Blockburger v. United States.

== See also ==
- List of United States Supreme Court cases, volume 495
- List of United States Supreme Court cases
- Lists of United States Supreme Court cases by volume
- List of United States Supreme Court cases by the Rehnquist Court
- United States v. Felix (1993)
