= Fong Foo v. United States =

- Supreme Court of the United States

Argued January 16, 1962 Decided March 19, 1962
- Full case name: Fong Foo, et al. v. United States
- Citations: 369 U.S. 141 (more) 82 S. Ct. 671; 7 L. Ed. 2d 629

Holding
- The Fifth Amendment's protection against double jeopardy still protects a defendant even if the conduct of the defendant's trial was improper.

Court membership
- Chief Justice Earl Warren Associate Justices Hugo Black · Felix Frankfurter; William O. Douglas · Tom C. Clark; John M. Harlan II · William J. Brennan Jr. Charles E. Whittaker · Potter Stewart

Case opinions
- Per curiam
- Concurrence: Harlan
- Dissent: Clark
- Whittaker took no part in the consideration or decision of the case.

Fong Foo v. United States, 369 U.S. 141 (1962), was a Supreme Court case in which the court held that acquittals in criminal cases are final even if issued by mistake. While the protection from double jeopardy did not get incorporated to apply to the state governments until 1969 (see Benton v. Maryland), the Supreme Court ruled that the Fifth Amendment to the United States Constitution prevented the federal government from bringing a defendant to trial twice for the same charge. In this case, the trial judge responded to prosecutorial misconduct by directing the jury to issue a verdict of acquittal rather than declaring a mistrial. Although the Supreme Court implied that this act was probably erroneous, and Justice Clark dissented on this basis, the court enforced the acquittal for the purpose of double jeopardy.

== Background of the case ==
The defendants (a corporation and two of its employees) were brought to trial under an indictment for conspiracy and other subsequent charges. The trial was in a federal district court that had jurisdiction over them and over the subject matter. The District judge, after hearing part, but not all, of the government's evidence, ordered the jury to acquit the defendants, which the jury did. The judge's action was based on supposed improper conduct of the United States District Attorney and the supposed lack of credibility of the prosecution's witnesses. The government filed for a writ of mandamus to the Court of Appeals. The Court of Appeals granted the petition and held that the defendants could be retried, based on its opinion that the District Judge did not have the power to direct the judgment of the jury, in this case. The case was then brought before the Supreme Court.

== Ruling of the Supreme Court ==
In its opinion, delivered per curiam, the Supreme Court reversed the judgment of the Court of Appeals on the grounds that its decision violated the Fifth Amendment. The Supreme Court focused on the section of the Amendment that reads "nor shall any person be subject for the same offense to be twice put in jeopardy of life or limb". The court explained that the trial had not terminated before the entry of a judgment, but with a final judgment acquitting the defendants. The Supreme Court recognized the error of the District Judge but ruled that the verdict was final and could not be reviewed without violating rights guaranteed by the 5th Amendment of the Constitution.
