= Eastburn family murders =

1985 murders in the United States

Timothy Hennis
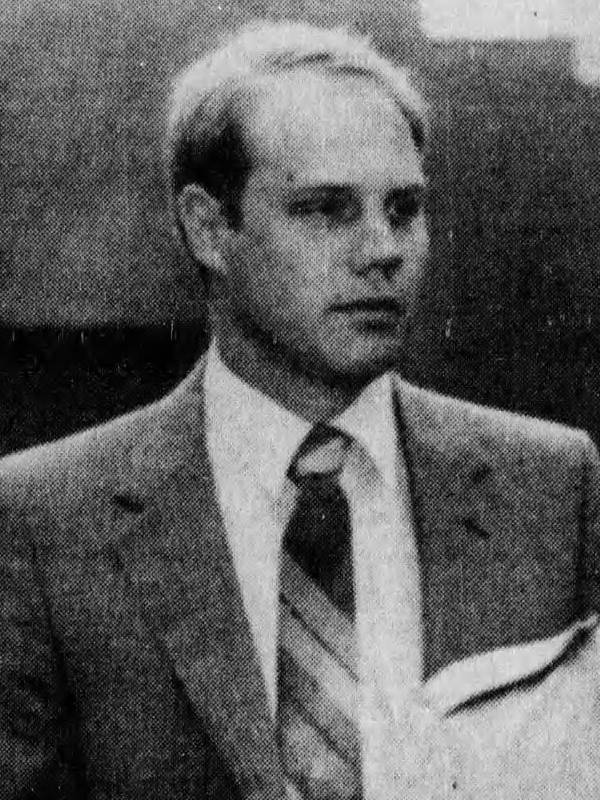
- Hennis in 1986, during his first trial
- Born: Timothy Baily Hennis; February 24, 1958 (age 68); Rochester, Minnesota, U.S.
- Status: Incarcerated
- Conviction: Premeditated murder (3 counts)
- Penalty: Death

Details
- Victims: Kathryn Eastburn, 31; Kara Eastburn, 5 Erin Eastburn, 3
- Date: May 12, 1985
- Country: United States
- State: North Carolina
- Imprisoned at: United States Disciplinary Barracks

In May 1985, Kathryn Eastburn and her daughters, Kara and Erin, were murdered in Fayetteville, North Carolina. In 1986, United States Army Sergeant Timothy Hennis was tried and convicted for the three murders. In 1988, Hennis's conviction was overturned on appeal, and he was acquitted the following year.

In 2006, the Cumberland County Sheriff's Office obtained DNA evidence linking Hennis to the crime. Despite the Fifth Amendment's Double Jeopardy Clause prohibiting retrials after acquittals, the United States Army was able to initiate prosecution and trial proceedings against Hennis under the dual sovereignty doctrine. In 2010, Hennis was tried and convicted by an Army court-martial for the triple murders and sentenced to death.

== Background ==
=== Eastburn family ===
The Eastburn family was a military family that lived in Fayetteville, North Carolina. Gary Eastburn was a Captain in the United States Air Force. He had met Kathryn "Katie" Eastburn during the 1970s, with the couple marrying in 1975. Gary and Katie subsequently had three children: Kara, Erin, and Jana (aged 5 years, 3 years, and 22 months, respectively, at the time of the murders). In 1983, the Air Force sent Gary and his family to Pope Air Force Base, where he served as air traffic control chief. In May 1985, Eastburn was undergoing training at a squadron's officer school in Montgomery, Alabama, with his wife and children remaining in Fayetteville.

=== Timothy Hennis ===
Timothy Baily Hennis (born February 24, 1958) grew up in Rochester, Minnesota, and graduated from Mayo High School in 1976. His father, Robert Hennis, was a manager at IBM Rochester during the 1970s. Hennis worked in Rochester until he joined the United States Army in 1980. Hennis later married. He and his wife, Angela, had a daughter in 1985. Around May 1985, Hennis worked as a parachute rigger at Fort Bragg.

== Murders ==
Since the Eastburn family was planning to relocate to England so that Eastburn could take up a liaison job with the Royal Air Force, Katie made arrangements to rehome the family's English Setter Dixie, posting an advertisement in the local newspaper Beeline Grab Bragg. On May 7, 1985, 27-year-old U.S. Army Sergeant Timothy Hennis responded to the ad, visiting the Eastburn family home. Hennis's young family owned a spitz at the time. After chatting with Katie, Hennis took Dixie home.

On May 11, Katie did not respond to her husband Gary's routine phone call. On May 12, a concerned neighbor named Bob Seefeldt and a police officer visited the home, where they discovered the remains of Katie, Kara, and Erin. Katie had been stripped to the waist, raped, and stabbed 15 times. Semen was also found inside her body. Kara had been stabbed repeatedly in the chest, while Erin had been bludgeoned in the chest and back. The youngest child, Jana, survived the attack, but was dehydrated and suffering from diarrhea.

== Investigation ==
Detectives Robert Bittle and Jack Watts of the Cumberland County Sheriff's Office were in charge of the homicide investigation. While combing the house, investigators found fingerprints and hair. A luminol test of the walls and master bathroom indicated that somebody had tried unsuccessfully to clean up the crime scene. After returning to Fayetteville, Gary Eastburn helped Bittle and Watts identify missing items, including an envelope of cash, Katie's ATM card, and a piece of paper containing her ATM password.

On the first night of the investigation, a janitor named Patrick Cone approached Bittle and Watts, telling them that he had witnessed a tall white man dressed in jeans, a knit cap, and a black "Members Only" jacket exiting the Eastburns' driveway carrying a garbage bag in the early morning hours of May 10. According to Cone, the man drove away in a white Chevrolet Chevette. Based on Cone's account, investigators believed that the Eastburn murders had occurred between 8 pm on May 9 and 3 am on May 10. Cone's description of the suspect was passed onto local media. Cone also helped the North Carolina State Bureau of Investigation produce a composite sketch of the suspect.

Following media coverage of the Eastburn killings, Hennis visited the local police station on May 15, where he submitted to interrogation by Watts and Bittle. When questioned, Hennis acknowledged that he had picked up the Eastburns' dog on May 7 but had no other contact with Katie apart from a phone call on May 9 discussing how Dixie was settling into the Hennis household. According to Hennis, he had driven his wife and daughter to his in-laws on the night of May 9, returning home after refueling his car. In addition, Hennis also provided investigators with blood, saliva, and hair samples and finger and palm prints. Due to his close resemblance to the composite sketch, investigators identified Hennis as the prime suspect from the onset. Cone identified Hennis during a photo lineup, leading to Hennis' arrest that evening.

In addition to Cone, Watts and Bittle utilized other witnesses and evidence. Investigators determined that Katie's stolen ATM card had been used twice, on the night of May 10 and the morning of May 11, with the two transactions amounting to a total of US$300. Investigators sought to link this to Hennis being late on his monthly rent payment and his prior convictions for writing bad checks. In addition, a female witness who visited the ATM shortly after the second transaction on May 11 had witnessed a blond man matching Hennis' description.

Hennis's alibi that he had returned home on the night of May 9 after dropping his family at the in-laws was challenged when his former girlfriend Nancy Maeser told investigators that he had made an impromptu visit to her home. Investigators also focused on the fact that Hennis had brought a black "Members Only" jacket to the dry cleaner on May 10 and his neighbors' eyewitness accounts alleging that Hennis had burned items within a barrel on the morning of May 11.

== First trial and imprisonment ==
Hennis's first trial occurred in Cumberland County in the summer of 1986. He was represented by Fayetteville lawyers Gerald Beaver and Billy Richardson. William VanStory led the prosecution. Before the trial, the prosecution offered Hennis a plea bargain: two counts of second-degree murder, with a likely penalty of two consecutive life sentences. Hennis turned down the plea bargain.

During the trial, VanStory and his team put forth the theory that Hennis had taken advantage of his wife Angela's absence to initiate a romantic relationship with the married Katie Eastburn. Katie had rebuffed his offer, leading Hennis to kill her and her two older children. In addition, the prosecution drew upon Cone and the female's eyewitness accounts and the transactions resulting from Katie's stolen ATM card. For added psychological effect, the prosecution presented several graphic crime scene photographs to the jury.

Following ten hours of deliberation, the jury found Hennis guilty of three counts of first degree murder and one count of first degree rape. On July 8, he was subsequently sentenced to death. Hennis was transferred to death row at the Central Prison in Raleigh, North Carolina. While in prison, Hennis received an anonymous letter claiming responsibility for the Eastburn murders:

"Dear Mr. Hennis, I did the crime, I murdered the Eastburns. Sorry you're doin [sic] the time. I'll be safely out of North Carolina when you read this. Thanks, Mr. X."

The anonymous letter was postmarked on July 8, 1986 (the date of the sentencing) and was also sent to the Sheriff's office.

== Appeal and second trial ==
In 1988, Hennis' defense lawyer Gerald Beaver successfully appealed Hennis' conviction at the North Carolina Supreme Court, arguing that the numerous graphic crime scene videos that the prosecution had shown the jury had unduly influenced them against his client. The judges ruled by a margin of five to two in Hennis' favor, granting him a retrial. According to Beaver, this marked the first time a prisoner on death row in North Carolina had been granted a new trial.

During the retrial held in April 1989, Beaver and Richardson represented Hennis while the prosecution consisted of Calvin Colyer and John Dickson, who had replaced VanStory. The defense challenged the prosecution's witnesses and evidence, focusing on star witness Cone's criminal offenses following the first trial. They also attacked Cone's testimony that the weather on the night of the murder was fair. By contrast, a meteorologist and helicopter pilot called by the defense testified that the weather had been overcast.

Beaver and Richardson also challenged the prosecution's female witness, who had sighted Hennis near the ATM on the morning of May 11, pointing out that she had initially told the investigators that she did not see Hennis but changed her story on the eve of the trial. In addition, Beaver and Richardson presented two new defense witnesses: a newspaper delivery woman who claimed that she saw a long-haired man driving a light-colored van on the morning of May 11 and a local teenager from the Eastburns' neighborhood named John Raupaugh who was jogging near the Eastburns' family home on the night of the murder. Raupaugh resembled Hennis and also wore similar attire that night, including a similar "Members Only" jacket.

In addition, Beaver and Richardson presented footprints, blood, and hair samples that did not match Hennis or the victims. The defense also presented Hennis' "Members Only" jacket, which had been tested to prove there were no bloodstains. Hennis also took the witness stand during the retrial. Following a three-week trial and two days of deliberation, the jury acquitted him of all charges.

== Aftermath ==
Gary Eastburn relocated with his surviving daughter Jana to a U.S. Air Force base north of London in 1988, taking up a liaison role with the Royal Air Force. Gary subsequently met and married an English nurse in 1991, who became Jana's stepmother. After retiring from the US Air Force, he worked overseas for several years before returning to the States, settling down in Washington.

Following his acquittal in 1989, Hennis received an honorable discharge from the United States Army in June, but re-enlisted shortly afterwards and was promoted to the rank of staff sergeant. He saw service in Iraq during Operation Desert Storm and Somalia. Hennis received several awards and accolades for his service. In 1998, Hennis and his family, who were now joined by their six-year-old son Andrew, moved to Fort Lewis, Washington. Hennis became the scoutmaster of Andrew's scouting troop, leading them on hiking expeditions. In July 2004, Hennis retired from the U.S. Army with the rank of master sergeant and found work at a waste treatment plant.

== New evidence and third trial ==
In May 2005, 16 years after the acquittal of Hennis, Captain Larry Trotter of the Cumberland County Sheriff's Office attended a detectives' seminar on advanced criminal-intelligence techniques, which discussed the Eastburn murders as a case study. After conversing with journalist Scott Whisnant, who had covered the Eastburn murder trials, Trotter learned that detectives had extracted semen from Katie's body using a vaginal swab. Since DNA testing was still in its infancy in the 1980s, investigators could not test the sample.

Trotter had the semen on the swab tested at the North Carolina State Bureau of Investigation's crime laboratory in Raleigh. In June 2006, a forensic test determined that the sample was 1.2 quadrillion times more likely to come from Hennis than from any other white person in North Carolina. Trotter shared the results with Edward Grannis, the Cumberland County district attorney, and Robert Bittle, who had participated in the 1985 investigation. Bittle then contacted Eastburn.

Though the Fifth Amendment's Double Jeopardy Clause prohibits retrials after acquittals, the United States Constitution's dual sovereignty doctrine allows a defendant tried and acquitted in a state court to be retried at a federal court. In addition, the Uniform Code of Military Justice permits military personnel tried in a civilian court to be court-martialed. At the request of the Cumberland County Sheriff's Office, Lieutenant General John R. Vines, the commanding officer at Fort Bragg, agreed to recall the retired Hennis back into service as a pretext for charging him with the Eastburn murders based on the new DNA evidence.

On September 26, 2006, Hennis was recalled to military duty and returned to Fort Bragg the following month, quitting his job at the waste treatment plant in the process. In August 2007, the Commander of the XVIII Airborne Corps ordered that Hennis be court-martialed on three counts of premeditated murder. In December 2007, Hennis appealed this decision because the Army lacked jurisdiction, but this petition was denied in April 2008. In May 2008, Hennis appealed against the court martial decision at the United States Army Court of Criminal Appeals, dismissed the following month. In September 2008, Hennis appealed to the United States Court of Appeals for the Armed Forces, but this was dismissed. In December 2009, Hennis appealed against the court martial at the United States District Court for the Eastern District of North Carolina, but this was rejected in March 2010.

Hennis' court-martial at Fort Bragg began on March 17, 2010, and lasted for three weeks. For the court-martial, Hennis enlisted the services of military lawyer Frank Spinner and two uniformed lawyers. The prosecution was represented by Army Captains Matt Scott and Nathan Huff. Colonel Patrick Parrish presided over the court martial proceedings while a jury panel of 14 military officers and non-commissioned personnel was convened. During the trial, the prosecution focused on the DNA evidence, with the prior eyewitness accounts as corroborating evidence.

Spinner's defense team argued that the footprints, blood, and hair samples found at the crime scene did not match Hennis or the victims. In addition, they suggested that the crime scene evidence at the former Eastburn family home in Fayetteville had been contaminated. In response to the DNA evidence, Spinner suggested that Hennis had consensual sex with Katie before her murder. Hennis himself denied having ever had sex with Katie Eastburn, consensually or otherwise. Following three hours of deliberation, the jury unanimously found Hennis guilty on April 3, 2010.

== Second imprisonment and appeals ==
On April 15, 2010, the jury panel recommended that Hennis be sentenced to death. In addition, he was demoted to the grade of Private E-1, stripped of all pay and allowances, and dishonorably discharged from the U.S. Army. Hennis was incarcerated at the United States Disciplinary Barracks at Fort Leavenworth in Kansas, where he remains today.

In January 2011, Hennis' attorneys called for Hennis to be given a new trial because a North Carolina State Bureau of Investigation lab worker named Brenda Bissette Dew, who testified at Hennis' first trial, but not the third trial, was under investigation for writing misleading reports in other cases. Prosecutor Jody Young questioned the defense attorneys' motives because they had argued that Hennis had consensual intercourse with the victim, Kathryn, before her murder. Judge Colonel Parrish denied the defense's request to obtain documents from the investigation into the SBI lab.

In September 2011, Hennis appealed his second conviction, claiming that the U.S. Army did not have the jurisdiction to try him for the murders. Hennis' appeal was heard at the United States Court of Appeals for the Fourth Circuit on October 26, 2011. Hennis' attorney Eric Allen argued that the U.S. military's jurisdiction over Hennis had expired at the time of the 2010 court martial, thus voiding the verdict. Citing the 1949 Supreme Court decision United States ex rel. Hirshberg v. Cooke, Allen pointed out that Hennis had been honorably discharged in 1989 following his acquittal but had re-enlisted. Based on this, he argued that this "break in service" rendered any crimes committed during his first term of service immune from prosecution.

In January 2012, the Fourth Circuit Court of Appeals affirmed the U.S. District Court's 2009 decision to dismiss Hennis' petition and deferred discussion of jurisdiction until Hennis' military appeals had been exhausted. In addition, the Acting Commander of Fort Bragg approved Hennis' murder convictions and the death penalty. In May 2012, the Supreme Court of the United States rejected Hennis' appeal to have the court review his case.

In September 2013, Hennis filed a second challenge at the Army Court of Criminal Appeals against the Army's jurisdiction to try him. This petition was denied in October 2013. In November 2013, Hennis appealed for the Army Court to reconsider its decision, suggesting that the petition be reviewed by all of the court's judges instead of a panel. This appeal was also denied.

In February 2014, Hennis filed a second appeal at the U.S. Court of Appeals for the Armed Forces, claiming that the U.S. Army lacked the jurisdiction to try him for the Eastburn murders.

In December 2017, the U.S. Court of Appeals for the Armed Forces ruled that it was unable to force the United States Government to provide additional financial support to Hennis' request for the services of a lawyer with experience in capital cases, a mitigation specialist, and a fact investigator.

In October 2019, Hennis' lawyers filed an appeal at the U.S. Court of Appeals for the Armed Forces, challenging the Army's jurisdiction to try Hennis citing constitutional double jeopardy prohibitions. In late February 2020, the Court of Appeals for the Armed Forces affirmed the U.S. Army Court of Criminal Appeals' verdict rejecting Hennis' appeal against the court martial proceedings.

On September 4, 2020, Attorneys for Hennis filed a writ for certiorari with the United States Supreme Court. The United States Supreme Court denied the writ on January 11, 2021.

== Legacy and popular culture ==
Defense attorneys still invoke the North Carolina Supreme Court's 1988 Hennis ruling to limit the presentation of redundant photographs that could unduly influence jurors.

Following Hennis' second retrial and acquittal in April 1989, the Wilmington-based Star-News journalist Scott Whisnant wrote a book looking at the Hennis trials called Innocent Victims, which was published in 1993. The book sold 175,000 copies and was later adapted into a 1996 ABC miniseries called Innocent Victims. Tim Hennis was portrayed by John Corbett, his parents Robert and Marylou Hennis were portrayed by Hal Holbrook and Rue McClanahan while the lawyers Beaver and Richardson were portrayed by Rick Schroder and Tom Irwin.

In 2012, the Investigation Discovery series Unusual Suspects documented the case in the episode "Mother's Day Murders".

In September 2014, the CNN crime documentary series Death Row Stories released an episode covering the Eastburn family murders and trials of Hennis.

== See also ==
- Capital punishment by the United States military
- John A. Bennett, the last person to be executed by the U.S. military
- List of death row inmates in the United States
