= Double jeopardy =

Legal defence preventing someone from being tried again on the same charges

In jurisprudence, double jeopardy is a procedural defence (primarily in common law jurisdictions) that prevents an accused person from being tried again on the same or similar charges following an acquittal or conviction. Double jeopardy is a common concept in criminal law – in civil law, a similar concept is that of res judicata.

A variation in common law countries is the peremptory plea, which may take the specific forms of autrefois acquit ('previously acquitted') or autrefois convict ('previously convicted'). These doctrines appear to have originated in ancient Roman law, in the broader principle non bis in idem ('not twice against the same').

== Availability as a legal defence ==
If a double jeopardy issue is raised, evidence will be placed before the court, which will typically rule as a preliminary matter whether the plea is substantiated; if it is, the projected trial will be prevented from proceeding. In some countries, certain exemptions are permitted. In Scotland, a new trial can be initiated if, for example, the acquitted has made a credible admission of guilt. Part of English law for over 800 years, it was partially abolished in England, Wales and Northern Ireland by the Criminal Justice Act 2003 where, following demand for change, serious offences may be re-tried following an acquittal if new and compelling evidence is found, and if the trial is found to be in the public's interest. In some countries, including Canada, Mexico, India and the United States, the guarantee against double jeopardy is a constitutional right. In other countries, the protection is afforded by statute. (Note: For example, in Western Australia: "It is a defence to a charge of any offence to show that the accused person has already been tried, and convicted or acquitted upon an indictment or prosecution notice on which he might have been convicted of the offence with which he is charged, or has already been convicted or acquitted of an offence of which he might be convicted upon the indictment or prosecution notice on which he is charged."—)

In common law countries, a defendant may enter a peremptory plea of autrefois acquit ('previously acquitted') or autrefois convict ('previously convicted'), with the same effect. (Note: The terminology apparently derived from Law French, and is a mixture of French autrefois 'at another time [in the past]' and borrowed-English loanwords.)

Double jeopardy is not a principle of international law. It does not apply between different countries, unless having been contractually agreed on between those countries as, for example, in the European Union (Art. 54 Schengen Convention), and in various extradition treaties between two countries.

== International Covenant on Civil and Political Rights ==
The 72 signatories and 166 parties to the International Covenant on Civil and Political Rights recognise, under Article 14 (7): "No one shall be liable to be tried or punished again for an offence for which he has already been finally convicted or acquitted in accordance with the law and penal procedure of each country." However, it does not apply to prosecutions by two different sovereigns (unless the relevant extradition treaty expresses a prohibition).

== European Convention on Human Rights ==
All members of the Council of Europe (which includes nearly all European countries and every member of the European Union) have adopted the European Convention on Human Rights. The Optional Protocol No. 7 to the convention, Article 4(1), protects against double jeopardy: "No one shall be liable to be tried or punished again in criminal proceedings under the jurisdiction of the same State for an offence for which he or she has already been finally acquitted or convicted in accordance with the law and penal procedure of that State."

All EU states ratified this optional protocol except for Germany, the United Kingdom, and the Netherlands. In those member states, national rules governing double jeopardy may or may not comply with the provision cited above.

Member states may, however, implement legislation which allows the reopening of a case if new evidence is found or if there was a fundamental defect in the previous proceedings:

The provisions of the preceding paragraph shall not prevent the reopening of the case in accordance with the law and penal procedure of the State concerned, if there is evidence of new or newly discovered facts, or if there has been a fundamental defect in the previous proceedings, which could affect the outcome of the case.

In many European countries, the prosecution may appeal an acquittal to a higher court. This is not regarded as double jeopardy, but as a continuation of the same case. The European Convention on Human Rights permits this by using the phrase "finally acquitted or convicted" as the trigger for prohibiting subsequent prosecution.

== By country ==
=== Australia ===
In contrast to other common law nations, Australian double jeopardy law has been held to further prevent the prosecution for perjury following a previous acquittal where a finding of perjury would controvert the acquittal. This was confirmed in the case of R v Carroll, where the police found new evidence convincingly disproving Carroll's sworn alibi two decades after he had been acquitted of murder charges in the death of Ipswich child Deidre Kennedy, and successfully prosecuted him for perjury. Public outcry following the overturn of his conviction (for perjury) by the High Court has led to widespread calls for reform of the law along the lines of the England and Wales legislation.

During a Council of Australian Governments (COAG) meeting of 2007, model legislation to rework double jeopardy laws was drafted, but there was no formal agreement for each state to introduce it. All states have now chosen to introduce legislation that mirrors COAG's recommendations on "fresh and compelling" evidence.

In New South Wales, retrials of serious cases with a minimum sentence of 20 years or more are now possible even if the original trial preceded the 2006 reform. On 17 October 2006, the New South Wales Parliament passed legislation abolishing the rule against double jeopardy in cases where:

- an acquittal of a "life sentence offence" (murder, violent gang rape, large commercial supply or production of illegal drugs) is debunked by "fresh and compelling" evidence of guilt;
- an acquittal of a "15 years or more sentence offence" was tainted (by perjury, bribery, or perversion of the course of justice).

On 30 July 2008, South Australia also introduced legislation to scrap parts of its double jeopardy law, legalising retrials for serious offences with "fresh and compelling" evidence, or if the acquittal was tainted.

In Western Australia, amendments introduced on 8 September 2011 allow retrial if "new and compelling" evidence is found. It applies to serious offences where the penalty is life imprisonment or imprisonment for 14 years or more. Acquittal because of tainting (witness intimidation, jury tampering, or perjury) also permits retrial.

In Tasmania, on 19 August 2008, amendments were introduced to allow retrial in serious cases if there is "fresh and compelling" evidence.

In Victoria on 21 December 2011, legislation was passed allowing new trials where there is "fresh and compelling DNA evidence, where the person acquitted subsequently admits to the crime, or where it becomes clear that key witnesses have given false evidence". However, retrial applications could only be made for serious offences such as murder, manslaughter, arson causing death, serious drug offences and aggravated forms of rape and armed robbery.

In Queensland on 18 October 2007, the double jeopardy laws were modified to allow a retrial where fresh and compelling evidence becomes available after an acquittal for murder or a "tainted acquittal" for a crime carrying a 25-year or more sentence. A "tainted acquittal" requires a conviction for an administration of justice offence, such as perjury, that led to the original acquittal.

=== Canada ===
The Canadian Charter of Rights and Freedoms includes provisions such as section 11(h) prohibiting double jeopardy. However, the prohibition only applies after an accused person has been "finally" convicted or acquitted. Canadian law allows the prosecution to appeal an acquittal based on legal errors. In rare circumstances, when a trial judge made all the factual findings necessary for a finding of guilt but misapplied the law, a court of appeal might also directly substitute an acquittal for a conviction. These cases are not considered double jeopardy because the appeal and the subsequent conviction are deemed to be a continuation of the original trial.

For an appeal from an acquittal to be successful, the Supreme Court of Canada requires the Crown prosecutor to show that an error in law was made during the trial and that it contributed to the verdict. It has been argued that this test is unfairly beneficial to the prosecution. For instance, in his book My Life in Crime and Other Academic Adventures, Martin Friedland contends that the rule should be changed so that a retrial is granted only when the error is shown to be responsible for the verdict, not just a factor.

Though the charter permits appeals of acquittals, there are still constitutional limits imposed on the scope of these appeals. In Corp. Professionnelle des Médecins v. Thibault, the Supreme Court struck down a provision of Quebec law that allowed appellate courts to conduct a de novo review of both legal and factual findings. In doing so, it held that the scope of an appeal may not extend to challenging findings of fact where no legal error has been made. At this point, the court reasoned, the process ceases to be an appeal and instead becomes a new trial disguised as an appeal.

A notable example cited by critics of Canada's appeal system is the case of Guy Paul Morin, who was wrongfully convicted in his second trial after the acquittal in his first trial was vacated by the Supreme Court. Another notable use of the system occurred in the case of child murderer Guy Turcotte, the Quebec Court of Appeal overturned the initial verdict of not criminally responsible by reason of mental disorder and ordered a second trial after it found that the judge gave erroneous instructions to the jury. Turcotte was later convicted of second-degree murder in the second trial. Another well-known example is Henry Morgentaler, whose repeated acquittals by juries were overturned on appeal in multiple provinces.

=== France ===
Once all appeals have been exhausted on a case, the judgement is final and the action of the prosecution is closed (code of penal procedure, art. 6), except if the final ruling was forged. Prosecution for a crime already judged is impossible even if incriminating evidence has been found. However, a person who has been convicted may request another trial on the grounds of new exculpating evidence through a procedure known as révision.

French law allows the prosecution to appeal an acquittal.

=== Germany ===
The Basic Law (Grundgesetz) for the Federal Republic of Germany protects against double jeopardy if a final verdict is pronounced. A verdict is final if nobody appeals against it.

Nobody shall be punished multiple times for the same crime on the basis of general criminal law.

— Art. 103 (3) GG

However, each trial party can appeal against a verdict in the first instance. The prosecution or the defendants can appeal against a judgement if they disagree with it. In this case, the trial starts again in the second instance, the court of appeal (Berufungsgericht), which reconsiders the facts and reasons and delivers a final judgement.

If one of the parties disagrees with the second instance's judgement, they can appeal it only for formal judicial reasons. The case will be checked in the third instance (Revisionsgericht) to see whether all laws were correctly applied.

The rule applies to the whole "historical event, which is usually considered a single historical course of actions the separation of which would seem unnatural". This is true even if new facts come to light that indicate other crimes.

The Penal Procedural Code (Strafprozessordnung) permits a retrial (Wiederaufnahmeverfahren), if it is in favour of the defendant or if the following events have happened:

A retrial not in favour of the defendant is permissible after a final judgement,

1. if a document that was considered authentic during the trial was actually not authentic or forged,
2. if a witness or authorised expert wilfully or negligently made a wrong deposition or wilfully gave a wrong simple testimony,
3. if a professional or lay judge, who made the decision, had committed a crime by violating his or her duties as a judge in the case
4. if an acquitted defendant makes a credible confession in court or out of court.

— § 362 StPO

In the case of an order of summary punishment, which can be issued by the court without a trial for lesser misdemeanours, there is a further exception:

A retrial not in favour of the defendant is also permissible if the defendant has been convicted in a final order of summary punishment and new facts or evidence have been brought forward, which establish grounds for a conviction of a felony by themselves or in combination with earlier evidence.

— § 373a StPO

In Germany, a felony is defined by § 12 (1) StGB as a crime that has a minimum of one year of imprisonment.

=== India ===
A partial protection against double jeopardy is a Fundamental Right guaranteed under Article 20 (2) of the Constitution of India, which states "No person shall be prosecuted and punished for the same offence more than once". This provision enshrines the concept of autrefois convict, that no one convicted of an offence can be tried or punished a second time. However, it does not extend to autrefois acquit, and so if a person is acquitted of a crime, he can be retried. In India, protection against autrefois acquit is a statutory right, not a fundamental one. Such protection is provided by provisions of the Code of Criminal Procedure, 1973 (the code has been replaced by the Bharatiya Nagarik Suraksha Sanhita, 2023) rather than by the Constitution. The Supreme Court of India has held that the protection under Article 20(2) exclusively applies to judicial punishments, as inquiry by administrative authorities do not amount to trial.

=== Japan ===
The Constitution of Japan, which came into effect on 3 May 1947, states in Article 39 that

No person shall be held criminally liable for an act which was lawful at the time it was committed, or of which he has been acquitted, nor shall he be placed in double jeopardy.

However, in 1950, one defendant was found guilty in the District Court for crimes related to the election law and was sentenced to paying a fine. The prosecutor wanted a stronger sentence and appealed to the High Court. As a result, the defendant was sentenced to three months of imprisonment. He appealed to the Supreme Court on the grounds that the sentence was excessive when compared with precedents and that he had been placed in double jeopardy, which was in violation of Article 39. On 27 September 1950, all fifteen judges of the Supreme Court made the Grand Bench Decision to rule against the defendant and declared that a criminal proceeding in the District Court, High Court and Supreme Court is all one case and that there is no double jeopardy. In other words, if the prosecutor appeals against a judgement of not guilty or a guilty decision that they think does not impose a severe enough sentence, the defendant will not be placed in double jeopardy.

On 7 October 2003, the Supreme Court made a landmark decision in the area of double jeopardy. The case involved Article 235 of the Penal Code, which addresses "simple larceny", and Article 2 of the Law for Prevention and Disposition of Robbery, Theft, etc., which addresses "habitual larceny". The Court ruled that in the event that there are two trials for separate cases of simple larceny, it will not be considered double jeopardy, even if the prosecutor could have charged both of them as a single crime of habitual larceny. The defendant in this case had committed crimes of trespassing and simple larceny on 22 occasions. The defence counsel argued that the crimes were actually one offence of habitual larceny and that charging them as separate counts was double jeopardy. The Supreme Court ruled that it was within the prosecutor's discretion as to whether to charge the defendant with one count of habitual larceny or to charge them with multiple counts of trespassing and simple larceny. In either case, it is not considered double jeopardy.

=== Netherlands ===
In the Netherlands, the state prosecution can appeal a not-guilty verdict at the bench. New evidence can be applied during a retrial at a district court. Thus one can be tried twice for the same alleged crime. If one is convicted at the district court, the defence can make an appeal on procedural grounds to the supreme court. The supreme court might admit this complaint, and the case will be reopened yet again, at another district court. Again, new evidence might be introduced by the prosecution.

On 9 April 2013, the Dutch senate voted 36 "yes" versus 35 "no" in favour of a new law that allows the prosecutor to re-try a person who was found not guilty in court. This law is limited to offences in which the statute of limitations does not expire. These are offences that are punishable by at least 12 years of imprisonment, and other specific offences. Offences that have already expired (such as prior to the change in legislation that abolished the statute of limitations) cannot be retried.

A retrial is only possible by ground of a 'novum': the situation in which new evidence has come to light and in which it seems that, had the judge known of this evidence, the defendant would have been prosecuted. The new evidence has to either be new technical evidence or a trustworthy confession by the defendant or their co-suspect.

=== Pakistan ===
Article 13 of the Constitution of Pakistan protects a person from being punished or prosecuted more than once for the same offence. Section 403 of The Code of Criminal Procedure contemplates a situation where a person having once been tried by a Court of competent jurisdiction and acquitted by such court cannot be tried again for the same offence or for any other offence based on similar facts. The scope of section 403 is restricted to criminal proceedings and not to civil proceedings and departmental inquiries.

=== Serbia ===
This principle is incorporated into the Constitution of the Republic of Serbia and further elaborated in its Criminal Procedure Act.

=== South Africa ===
The Bill of Rights in the Constitution of South Africa forbids a retrial when there has already been an acquittal or a conviction.

Every accused person has a right to a fair trial, which includes the right ... not to be tried for an offence in respect of an act or omission for which that person has previously been either acquitted or convicted ...

— Constitution of the Republic of South Africa, 1996, s. 35(3)(m)

=== South Korea ===
Article 13 of the South Korean constitution provides that no citizen shall be placed in double jeopardy.

=== United Kingdom ===
==== England and Wales ====
Double jeopardy has been permitted in England and Wales in certain (exceptional) circumstances since the Criminal Justice Act 2003.

===== Pre-2003 =====
The doctrines of autrefois acquit and autrefois convict persisted as part of the common law from the time of the Norman Conquest of England; they were regarded as essential elements for protection of the subject's liberty and respect for due process of law in that there should be finality of proceedings. There were only three exceptions, all relatively recent, to the rules:

- The prosecution has a right of appeal against acquittal in summary cases if the decision appears to be wrong in law or in excess of jurisdiction.
- A retrial is permissible if the interests of justice so require, following an appeal against conviction by a defendant.
- A "tainted acquittal", where there has been an offence of interference with, or intimidation of, a juror or witness, can be challenged in the High Court.

In Connelly v DPP [1964] AC 1254, the Law Lords ruled that a defendant could not be tried for any offence arising out of substantially the same set of facts relied upon in a previous charge of which he had been acquitted unless there are "special circumstances" proven by the prosecution. There is little case law on the meaning of "special circumstances", but it has been suggested that the emergence of new evidence would suffice.

A defendant who had been convicted of an offence could be given a second trial for an aggravated form of that offence if the facts constituting the aggravation were discovered after the first conviction. By contrast, a person who had been acquitted of a lesser offence could not be tried for an aggravated form even if new evidence became available.

===== Post-2003 =====
Following the murder of Stephen Lawrence, the Macpherson Report recommended that the double jeopardy rule should be abrogated in murder cases, and that it should be possible to subject an acquitted murder suspect to a second trial if "fresh and viable" new evidence later came to light. The Law Commission later added its support to this in its report "Double Jeopardy and Prosecution Appeals" (2001). A parallel report into the criminal justice system by Lord Justice Auld, a past Senior Presiding Judge for England and Wales, had also commenced in 1999 and was published as the Auld Report six months after the Law Commission report. It opined that the Law Commission had been unduly cautious by limiting the scope to murder and that "the exceptions should [...] extend to other grave offences punishable with life and/or long terms of imprisonment as Parliament might specify." 1999 was also the year of a highly publicised case in which a man, David Smith, was convicted of the murder of a prostitute after having been acquitted of the "almost identical" murder of sex worker Sarah Crump six years previously. Because of the double jeopardy laws that existed at the time, Smith could not be re-tried for Crump's murder, despite police insisting they were not looking for anybody else and that the case was closed. (Note: Following the 2003 reforms, Smith's acquittal for murdering Crump was overturned in 2023 and he was tried and convicted.)

Both Jack Straw (then Home Secretary) and William Hague (then Leader of the Opposition) favoured the measures suggested by the Auld Report. These recommendations were implemented—not uncontroversially at the time—within the Criminal Justice Act 2003, and this provision came into force in April 2005. It opened certain serious crimes (including murder, manslaughter, kidnapping, rape, armed robbery, and serious drug crimes) to a retrial, regardless of when committed, with two conditions: the retrial must be approved by the Director of Public Prosecutions, and the Court of Appeal must agree to quash the original acquittal due to "new and compelling evidence". Then Director of Public Prosecutions, Ken Macdonald QC, said that he expected no more than a handful of cases to be brought in a year.

Pressure by Ann Ming, the mother of 1989 murder victim Julie Hogg—whose killer, Billy Dunlop, was initially acquitted and subsequently confessed—also contributed to the demand for legal change. On 11 September 2006, Dunlop became the first person to be convicted of murder following a prior acquittal for the same crime, in his case his 1991 acquittal of Hogg's murder. Some years later he had confessed to the crime, and was convicted of perjury, but was unable to be retried for the killing itself. The case was re-investigated in early 2005, when the new law came into effect, and his case was referred to the Court of Appeal, in November 2005, for permission for a new trial, which was granted. Dunlop pleaded guilty to murder and was sentenced to life imprisonment, with a recommendation he serve no less than 17 years.

On 13 December 2010, Mark Weston became the first person to be retried and found guilty of murder by a jury (Dunlop having pleaded guilty). In 1996 Weston had been acquitted of the murder of Vikki Thompson at Ascott-under-Wychwood on 12 August 1995, but following the discovery in 2009 of compelling new evidence (Thompson's blood on Weston's boots) he was arrested and tried for a second time. He was sentenced to life imprisonment, to serve a minimum of 13 years.

In December 2018, convicted paedophile Russell Bishop was also retried and found guilty by a jury for the Babes in the Wood murders of two 9-year-old girls, Nicola Fellows and Karen Hadaway, on 9 October 1986. At the original trial in 1987, a key piece of the prosecution's case rested on the recovery of a discarded blue sweatshirt. Under questioning, Bishop denied that the sweatshirt belonged to him, but his girlfriend, Jennifer Johnson, alleged the clothing was Bishop's, before she changed her story in the trial, telling the jury she had never seen the top before. Attributed to a series of blunders in the prosecution's case, Bishop was acquitted by the jury after two hours of deliberations. Three years later, Bishop was found guilty of the abduction, molestation, and attempted murder of a 7-year-old girl in February 1990. In 2014, re-examined by modern forensics, the sweatshirt contained traces of Bishop's DNA, and also had fibres on it from both of the girls' clothing. Tapings taken from Karen Hadaway's arm also yielded traces of Bishop's DNA. At the 2018 trial, a jury of seven men and five women returned a guilty verdict after two-and-a-half hours of deliberation.

On 14 November 2019, Michael Weir became the first person to be twice found guilty of a murder. He was originally convicted of the murder of Leonard Harris in 1999, but the conviction was quashed in 2000 by the Court of Appeal on a technicality. In 2018, new DNA evidence had been obtained and palm prints from both murder scenes were matched to Weir. Twenty years after the original conviction, Weir was convicted of the murder for a second time.

In February 2020, Merseyside Police called for further reform to the double jeopardy law in England so as to allow previously acquitted suspects to be re-interviewed by police. The force had wanted to re-interview a suspect in the unsolved case of the murders of John Greenwood and Gary Miller who had been acquitted of the crime in 1981, but were not permitted to do so. The force had also not been allowed to re-charge the man of murder in 2019, causing them to publicly request that the law be changed and stating: "We believe being able to re-question suspects could potentially lead to being able to demonstrate the new and compelling evidence needed to reopen particular cases, including the murders of John Greenwood and Gary Miller".

==== Scotland ====
The double jeopardy rule no longer applies absolutely in Scotland since the Double Jeopardy (Scotland) Act 2011 came into force on 28 November 2011. The Act introduced three broad exceptions to the rule: where the acquittal had been tainted by an attempt to pervert the course of justice; where the accused admitted their guilt after acquittal; and where there was new evidence.

==== Northern Ireland ====
In Northern Ireland, the Criminal Justice Act 2003, effective 18 April 2005, makes certain "qualifying offence" (including murder, rape, kidnapping, specified sexual acts with young children, specified drug offences, defined acts of terrorism, as well as in certain cases attempts or conspiracies to commit the foregoing) subject to retrial after acquittal (including acquittals obtained before passage of the Act) if there is a finding by the Court of Appeal that there is "new and compelling evidence".

=== United States ===
In the United States, the protection in common law against double jeopardy is maintained through the Double Jeopardy Clause of the Fifth Amendment to the Constitution, which provides:

... nor shall any person be subject for the same offence to be twice put in jeopardy of life or limb; ...

Conversely, double jeopardy comes with a key exception. Under the dual sovereignty doctrine, multiple sovereigns can indict a defendant for the same crime. The federal and state governments can have overlapping criminal laws, so a criminal offender may be convicted in individual states and federal courts for exactly the same crime or for different crimes arising out of the same facts. However, in 2016, the Supreme Court held in Puerto Rico v. Sanchez Valle that Puerto Rico is not a separate sovereign for purposes of the Double Jeopardy Clause. The dual sovereignty doctrine has been the subject of substantial scholarly criticism.

As described by the U.S. Supreme Court in Ball v. United States 163 U.S. 662 (1896), one of its earliest cases dealing with double jeopardy, "the prohibition is not against being twice punished, but against being twice put in jeopardy; and the accused, whether convicted or acquitted, is equally put in jeopardy at the first trial". The Double Jeopardy Clause encompasses four distinct prohibitions: subsequent prosecution after acquittal, subsequent prosecution after conviction, subsequent prosecution after certain mistrials, and multiple punishment in the same indictment. Jeopardy "attaches" when the jury is impanelled, the first witness is sworn, or a plea is accepted.

In rare cases, double jeopardy may also apply to prosecutorial or judge misconduct in the same jurisdiction. The double jeopardy protection in criminal prosecutions bars only an identical prosecution for the same offence; however, a different offence may be charged on identical evidence at a second trial. Res judicata protection is stronger – it precludes any causes of action or claims that arise from a previously litigated subject matter.

==== Prosecution after acquittal ====
With two exceptions, the government is not permitted to appeal or retry the defendant once jeopardy attaches to a trial unless the case does not conclude. Conditions which constitute "conclusion" of a case include

- After the entry of an acquittal, whether:
  - an acquittal by jury verdict
  - a directed verdict before the case is submitted to the jury,
  - a directed verdict after a deadlocked jury,
  - an appellate reversal for sufficiency (except by direct appeal to a higher appellate court), or
  - an "implied acquittal" via conviction of a lesser included offence.
- re-litigating against the same defence a fact necessarily found by the jury in a prior acquittal, even if the jury hung on other counts. In such a situation, the government is barred by collateral estoppel.

In these cases, the trial is concluded and the prosecution is precluded from appealing or retrying the defendant over the offence to which they were acquitted.

This principle does not prevent the government from appealing a pre-trial motion to dismiss or other non-merits dismissal, or a directed verdict after a jury conviction, nor does it prevent the trial judge from entertaining a motion for reconsideration of a directed verdict, if the jurisdiction has so provided by rule or statute. Nor does it prevent the government from retrying the defendant after an appellate reversal other than for sufficiency, including habeas corpus, or "thirteenth juror" appellate reversals notwithstanding sufficiency on the principle that jeopardy has not "terminated".

The dual sovereignty doctrine allows a federal prosecution of an offence to proceed regardless of a previous state prosecution for that same offence and vice versa because "an act denounced as a crime by both national and state sovereignties is an offence against the peace and dignity of both and may be punished by each". The doctrine is solidly entrenched in the law, but there has been a traditional reluctance in the federal executive branch to gratuitously wield the power it grants, due to public opinion being generally hostile to such action.

==== Exceptions ====
There are two exceptions to bans on retrying defendants. If a defendant bribed a judge into acquitting him or her, the defendant was not in jeopardy and can be retried. A member of the armed forces can be retried by court-martial in a military court, even if he or she has been previously acquitted by a civilian court. This exception was used to prosecute Timothy Hennis for the Eastburn family murders after his previous trial acquitted him.

An individual can be prosecuted by both the United States and an Indian tribe for the same acts that constituted crimes in both jurisdictions; it was established by the Supreme Court in United States v. Lara that as the two are separate sovereigns, prosecuting a crime under both tribal and federal law does not attach double jeopardy.

==== Multiple punishment, including prosecution after conviction ====
In Blockburger v. United States (1932), the Supreme Court announced the following test: the government may separately try and punish the defendant for two crimes if each crime contains an element that the other does not. Blockburger is the default rule, unless the governing statute legislatively intends to depart; for example, Continuing Criminal Enterprise (CCE) may be punished separately from its predicates, as can conspiracy.

The Blockburger test, originally developed in the multiple punishments context, is also the test for prosecution after conviction. In Grady v. Corbin (1990), the Court held that a double jeopardy violation could lie even where the Blockburger test was not satisfied, but Grady was later distinguished in United States v. Felix (1992), when the court reverted to the Blockburger test without completely dismissing the Grady interpretation. The court eventually overruled Grady in United States v. Dixon (1993).

==== Prosecution after mistrial ====
The rule for mistrials depends upon who sought the mistrial. If the defendant moves for a mistrial, there is no bar to retrial, unless the prosecutor acted in "bad faith", i.e. goaded the defendant into moving for a mistrial because the government specifically wanted a mistrial. If the prosecutor moves for a mistrial, there is no bar to retrial if the trial judge finds "manifest necessity" for granting the mistrial. The same standard governs mistrials granted sua sponte.

Retrials are not common, due to the legal expenses to the government. However, in the mid-1980s Georgia antique dealer James Arthur Williams was tried a record four times for murder over the shooting of Danny Hansford, and after three mistrials was finally acquitted on the grounds of self-defence. The case is recounted in the book Midnight in the Garden of Good and Evil, which was adapted into a film directed by Clint Eastwood (the movie combines the four trials into one).

== See also ==
- David Smith (murderer)
- Emmett Till
- Sam Sheppard
- O. J. Simpson
