= Blockburger v. United States =

- Supreme Court of the United States

Argued November 24, 1931 Decided January 4, 1932
- Full case name: Blockburger v. United States
- Citations: 284 U.S. 299 (more) 52 S. Ct. 180; 76 L. Ed. 306; 1932 U.S. LEXIS 875

Case history
- Prior: 50 F.2d 795 (7th Cir. 1931); cert. granted, 284 U.S. 607 (1931).

Holding
- If the same act or transaction constitutes a violation of two distinct statutory provisions, the test to be applied to determine whether there is one or two offenses is whether each provision requires proof of an additional fact that the other does not.

Court membership
- Chief Justice Charles E. Hughes Associate Justices Oliver W. Holmes Jr. · Willis Van Devanter; James C. McReynolds · Louis Brandeis; George Sutherland · Pierce Butler; Harlan F. Stone · Owen Roberts

Case opinion
- Majority: Sutherland, joined by unanimous

Laws applied
- U.S. Const., Amend. V, Harrison Narcotics Act

Blockburger v. United States, 284 U.S. 299 (1932), was a case in which the Supreme Court of the United States set an important standard to prevent double jeopardy.

== Background ==
The defendant was charged with violations of the Harrison Narcotics Act. Specifically, he was indicted on five separate counts, all involving the sale of morphine to the same purchaser.

The jury returned a verdict against petitioner upon the second, third, and fifth counts only. The second count charged a sale on a specified day of ten grains of the drug not in or from the original stamped package. The third count charged a sale on the following day of eight grains of the drug not in or from the original stamped package. The fifth count charged the latter sale also as having been made not in pursuance of a written order of the purchaser as required by the statute.

The district court sentenced petitioner to five years' imprisonment and a fine of $2,000 upon each count, the terms of imprisonment to run consecutively. The judgment was affirmed on appeal by the Seventh Circuit Court of Appeals.

The defendant advanced two legal theories as his defense:

1. The two sales charged in the second and third counts had been made to the same person, constituting a single continuous offense.
2. The sale charged in the third count had been made not from the original stamped package, and the same sale charged in the fifth count had been made not in pursuance of a written order of the purchaser, which constituted one offense for which only a single penalty could lawfully be imposed.

== Decision ==
Justice Sutherland, writing for a unanimous court, first held that the two sales, having been made at different times (albeit to the same person), were two separate and distinct violations of the law. He then held that under the statute, two distinct offenses are created by each section. Section 1 of the act created the offense of selling any of the forbidden drugs except in or from the original stamped package, and Section 2 creates the offense of selling any of such drugs not in pursuance of a written order of the person to whom the drug is sold. Because the defendant had violated both sections, he could be prosecuted separately under the two sections.

As to the issue of whether the defendant had been subjected to double jeopardy, Sutherland reasoned negatively:

Each of the offenses created requires proof of a different element. The applicable rule is that, where the same act or transaction constitutes a violation of two distinct statutory provisions, the test to be applied to determine whether there are two offenses or only one is whether each provision requires proof of an additional fact which the other does not.

While Sutherland conceded that the penalties under the act were harsh, he wrote that it was up to Congress, rather than the courts, to change the sentencing scheme.

Although the case is often cited for the standard that it set with regard to double jeopardy, the Fifth Amendment to the US Constitution is not mentioned anywhere in the text of the opinion itself. The Blockburger case was solely decided as a rule of Federal statutory interpretation. It was not until the U.S. Supreme Court decided, Brown v. Ohio, 432 U.S. 161 (1977), some 45 years later, did the court rule that the Blockburger test was a matter of constitutional law and thus applicable to the states when interpreting state statutes.

The landmark case established the "same elements test" to determine if two offenses are the same for the purposes of double jeopardy. Under the Blockburger test, a defendant may be convicted of two offenses arising out of the same criminal incident if each crime contains an element that is not found in the other.

The appellate court determines whether each crime contains an element that is not found in the other by examining only the relevant statute, the information and the bill of particulars, not by examining the evidence presented at trial. State v. Tweedy, 594 A.2d 906 (Conn. 1991).
