= Waller v. Florida =

- Supreme Court of the United States

Argued November 13, 1969 Decided April 6, 1970
- Full case name: Joseph Waller, Jr., Petitioner v. State of Florida
- Citations: 397 U.S. 387 (more) 90 S.Ct. 1184; 25 L. Ed. 2d 435; 1970 U.S. LEXIS 52

Case history
- Prior: Waller v. State, 213 So. 2d 623 (Fla. Dist. Ct. App. 1968); cert. denied, 221 So. 2d 749 (Fla. 1968); cert. granted, 395 U.S. 975 (1969).
- Subsequent: Rehearing denied, 398 U.S. 914 (1970); on remand, Waller v. State, 270 So. 2d 26 (Fla. Dist. Ct. App. 1972); cert. denied, 276 So. 2d 489 (Fla. 1973); cert. denied, 414 U.S. 945 (1973).

Holding
- The Double Jeopardy Clause protects defendants from successive prosecutions by states and municipalities for offenses based on the same criminal conduct.

Court membership
- Chief Justice Warren E. Burger Associate Justices Hugo Black · William O. Douglas; John M. Harlan II · William J. Brennan Jr. Potter Stewart · Byron White; Thurgood Marshall

Case opinions
- Majority: Burger, joined by Black, Douglas, Harlan, Stewart, White, Marshall
- Concurrence: Black
- Concurrence: Brennan

Waller v. Florida, 397 U.S. 387 (1970), was a decision by the United States Supreme Court, which held that the Double Jeopardy Clause protects defendants from successive prosecutions by states and municipalities for offenses based on the same criminal conduct.

== Background ==
Joseph Waller, Jr., also known as Omali Yeshitela, was a former member and organizer of the Student Nonviolent Coordinating Committee (SNCC). During the 1950s and 1960s, he actively participated in the American Civil Rights Movement. Today, he is chairman of the Uhuru Movement and has started branches in the Uhuru House Centers of St. Petersburg, FL and Oakland, FL. This case was significant in propelling Yeshitela's path toward advocacy and activism.

== Previous Legal Precedents ==
Before this case, the U.S. Supreme Court had not definitively ruled on the application of the Double Jeopardy Clause in regards to local and state ordinances and provisions. In fact, before Waller, about half of the states allowed for these double prosecutions, and some lower federal courts permitted it as well. Palko v. Connecticut was the dominant precedent at the time, which gave permission for the individual states to essentially ignore the Fifth Amendment of the Constitution in enacting their own specific provisions regarding double jeopardy. Palko essentially gave the states full discretion in how they conducted double jeopardy prosecutions, with the exception that they followed the procedural due process of the judicial system.

However, this line of precedents was replaced by another, Benton v. Maryland. In this case, the Fifth Amendment Double Jeopardy Clause was incorporated and made applicable to the states through the Fourteenth Amendment, overruling the previous Palko case. Due to the holding in Benton, it became almost inevitable that the various state provisions outlining multiple prosecutions for the same instance be re-evaluated, some of them before the U.S. Supreme Court.

== Dual Sovereignty ==
Before Waller was decided, states had different qualifications for what constituted double jeopardy and which circumstances allowed for multiple prosecutions. Some states theorized that the judicial relationship between the municipalities and the states was relative to the relationship between the state government and the federal government. This justification is similar to a dual sovereignty embedded in the states' legislation which permits those multiple prosecutions for the same occurrences and crimes. There have been a few cases, such as Abbate v. United States and Bartkus v. Illinois, that had previously allowed double prosecutions if they took place on a state level and then on a federal level, but obviously these precedents didn't last long. The U.S. Supreme Court has distinguished between the sovereignty of the states and the federal government regarding some principles, but they have rejected the claim that the separation of sovereignty is so far that double jeopardy need not be acknowledged by the states.

== Case Facts ==
Waller was one of many who led a protest in St. Petersburg, Florida on December 29, 1966. During this protest, they marched to the St. Petersburg City Hall, where they removed a racially controversial mural from the wall. The mural exhibited a group of Negroes musically entertaining a group of whites. The protestors then continued to march through St. Petersburg until they were stopped and subsequently arrested by law enforcement. The police eventually obtained the mural from the protestors, but only after a scuffle resulting in the mural's damaged condition. The City of St. Petersburg charged Waller and five others with the violation of destruction of city property and disorderly breach of the peace. He was found guilty for both counts in the municipal court and was sentenced to 180 days in the county jail. During the municipal court process, Waller made the statement that "What happened Dec. 29, 1966, occurred as a result of a program I initiated to bring the plight of my people to the attention of the people of St. Petersburg..."

Waller was subsequently charged by the State of Florida for grand larceny, which was based on the same acts with which he was charged against by the City of St. Petersburg. He moved for a writ of prohibition in the Florida Supreme Court to prevent a second trial in the circuit court, due to his claim that a second trial would constitute double jeopardy. The Florida Supreme Court denied relief. Waller was then tried in the Circuit Court of Florida by a jury, where he was found guilty of the grand larceny felony charge. He was then sentenced to six months to five years in prison, minus 170 of the days from his previous 180-day municipal court sentence.

Upon Waller's appeal to the Florida District Court of Appeals, he was denied of his double jeopardy claim. The District Court's rejection acknowledged that the courts' actions were based on the same acts as those involved in the two City of St. Petersburg ordinances, but still did not find Waller to be subject to double jeopardy. Waller's petition for a writ of certiorari to the Florida Supreme Court was denied.

The United States Supreme Court then granted review for this case, with Leslie H. Levinson from Gainesville, Florida representing petitioner Joseph Waller and George Georgieff from Tallahassee, Florida as representation for the respondent. The case was argued before the U.S. Supreme Court on November 13, 1969, and the decision was handed down on April 6, 1970.

== Decision ==
Chief Justice Warren E. Burger wrote the majority opinion in this case on behalf of the U.S. Supreme Court. The question was whether or not two courts in the same state can place defendants on trial for the same crime, and whether or not this constituted double jeopardy. Double jeopardy provisions were made applicable to the states in Benton v. Maryland. This case, in addition to North Carolina v. Pearce, was considered in answering the issue brought forth in Waller's case. Florida asserted that there is a separate sovereignty between the state government and its municipalities, similar to the sovereignty distinguished between the federal government and the states. This is not the only state to assert this theory. However, the Florida courts were found to have error in their holdings that being tried in a municipal court is not a bar for being tried at the state level for the same offense. Thus, the U.S. Supreme Court found that it was considered double jeopardy to be held for the same charge once by a state, and another by a local or municipal court, thereby making the state of Florida's actions unconstitutional.

== Concurring ==
Justice William J. Brennan, Jr. wrote a concurring opinion, in which he agreed with the majority that municipal and state courts within the same state are not separately sovereign. However, he furthered his opinion by stating that a second trial is barred if it occurs in the same state as the first unless it falls under one of the exceptions to the "same transaction" rule, which provides the legal exceptions to double jeopardy that would be considered permissible.

== Mural Replacement ==
In July 1998, St. Petersburg City Council members approved a plan that outlined a replacement mural to hang where the former one once hung. The proposed new mural was a landscape oil painting of water and palm trees and is one of two created by the Tarpon Springs artist Christopher Still that were placed above the marble staircases in the city hall that led to the council's chambers. The two paintings are 78 inches by 118 inches and were purchased by the city of St. Petersburg for $50,000 as a part of their public arts program.

When Yeshitela (formally Waller, Jr.) learned of the new mural plans, he felt that an apology on behalf of the city was necessary. According to him, "It seems to me that this City Council, which is talking about putting a mural in that spot, should be obligated to make an apology to the African community for that monstrosity that hung there until 1966," said Yeshitela, chairman of the African People's Socialist Party. When I tore that mural down, I was castigated in a lot of quarters as a criminal and I in fact served time in prison for it." Other African-Americans in the community shared in Yeshitela's resentment of the St. Petersburg City Council's new decisions regarding the mural.

== Ashe v. Swenson ==
Ashe v. Swenson is important to Waller because it was decided by the U.S. Supreme Court in the same year and both cases questioned the application of double jeopardy in the states. The petitioner was convicted of robbing one man who was playing poker with five others. During the trial, the jury found the petitioner to be not guilty due to insufficient evidence and was therefore acquitted of the charges. However, shortly after, another suit was brought against the petitioner for the robbery of another man that was present at the same incident. During this trial, the U.S. Supreme Court reversed and remanded the lower decisions and held that the petitioner could not be prosecuted twice for the same course of events. Justice Brennan provided a concurring opinion, stating that the decision should have been reversed simply because the Double Jeopardy Clause of the Fifth Amendment prohibits it. Justice Burger provided a dissenting opinion in which he expressed that the petitioner's second trial was not double jeopardy because it was a different complainant.

== Conclusion ==
Waller v. Florida established the presence and extension of the Fifth Amendment Double Jeopardy Clause in the states and their municipalities and further clarified discrepancies that existed in a large portion of the states. The details of the case also stood on a monumental level regarding the civil rights movement in St. Petersburg, Florida.

== See also ==
- List of United States Supreme Court cases, volume 397
- Ashe v. Swenson (1970)
