= List of United States Supreme Court cases, volume 399 =

This is a list of all the United States Supreme Court cases from volume 399 of the United States Reports:

Case name	Citation	Date decided
Coleman v. Alabama	399 U.S. 1	1970
A probable-cause hearing where a court decides whether there is sufficient evidence to present to a grand jury has a Sixth Amendment right-to-counsel requiring the appointment of a lawyer for the defendant.
Vale v. Louisiana	399 U.S. 30	1970
A search of a suspect's house is not "incident to the arrest" when the suspect's arrest took place outside.
Chambers v. Maroney	399 U.S. 42	1970
Baldwin v. New York	399 U.S. 66	1970
Williams v. Florida	399 U.S. 78	1970
Illinois v. Missouri	399 U.S. 146	1970
California v. Green	399 U.S. 149	1970
It is not a violation of the Confrontation Clause to introduce hearsay evidence stated by a witness at a preliminary hearing when the witness was under oath and the defendant had a fair chance to cross-examine the witness. Here, the defendant had such a chance because he was represented by counsel.
Phoenix v. Kolodziejski	399 U.S. 204	1970
Arkansas v. Tennessee	399 U.S. 219	1970
Perkins v. Standard Oil Co.	399 U.S. 222	1970
The allowance in § 4 of the Clayton Act for attorneys' fees includes fees for appellate legal services rendered in a successfully prosecuted private antitrust action.
Nelson v. George	399 U.S. 224	1970
Williams v. Illinois	399 U.S. 235	1970
If a person cannot afford to pay a fine, it violates equal protection to convert that unpaid fines into jail time to extend a person's incarceration beyond a statutory maximum length.
United States v. Sisson	399 U.S. 267	1970
United States v. Phillipsburg Nat. Bank & Tr. Co.	399 U.S. 350	1970
Gunn v. Univ. Comm. to End War in Viet Nam	399 U.S. 383	1970
New Haven Inclusion Cases	399 U.S. 392	1970
Morris v. Schoonfield	399 U.S. 508	1970
Grant, vacate, remand for reconsideration in light of Williams v. Illinois.
Simmons v. West Haven Housing Auth.	399 U.S. 510	1970
United States v. Sweet	399 U.S. 517	1970
Dismissed for lack of jurisdiction. Rather than appealing the decision under § 3731, the government appealed under D.C.Code § 23-105, which contains no provision allowing transfer to the Supreme Court.
Raskin v. P.D. Marchessini, Inc.	399 U.S. 519	1970
Grant, vacate, remand for reconsideration in light of Chambers v. Maroney.
Perini v. Colosimo	399 U.S. 519	1970
Grant, vacate, remand for reconsideration in light of Chambers v. Maroney.
Dunn v. Louisiana	399 U.S. 520	1970
Dismissed for want of a federal question. Justice Marshall would have reversed the judgment below with the reasoning from his dissent to Williams v. Florida.
Crouse v. Wood	399 U.S. 520	1970
Grant, vacate, remand for reconsideration in light of Chambers v. Maroney.
Dial v. Fontaine	399 U.S. 521	1970
Grant, vacate, remand for reconsideration in light of Gunn v. University Committee to End the War in Viet Nam.
Hocker v. Heffley	399 U.S. 521	1970
Grant, vacate, remand for reconsideration in light of Chambers v. Maroney.
Hutcherson v. Lehtin	399 U.S. 522	1970
Grant, vacate, remand for reconsideration in light of Gunn v. University Committee to End the War in Viet Nam.
Penner v. United States	399 U.S. 522	1970
Grant, vacate, remand with instructions to dismiss the indictment.
Peet v. United States	399 U.S. 523	1970
Grant, vacate, remand with a citation to Gutknecht v. United States.
Guerrieri v. United States	399 U.S. 523	1970
Grant, vacate, remand for a determination of whether Guierrieri was indigent and proceeding in good faith.
Hoyt v. Minnesota	399 U.S. 524	1970
Grant, vacate, remand order with a citation to Redrup v. New York. Three justices dissented.
Kelley v. Arizona	399 U.S. 525	1970
Grant, vacate, remand for reconsideration in light of Chambers v. Maroney.
Morico v. United States	399 U.S. 526	1970
Grant, vacate, remand for reconsideration in light of Welsh v. United States. Four justices dissenting from the grant of certiorari.
