= Gillette v. United States =

- Supreme Court of the United States

Argued December 9, 1970 Decided March 8, 1971
- Full case name: Guy Porter Gillette v. United States of America
- Docket no.: 85
- Citations: 401 U.S. 437 (more) 91 S. Ct. 828; 28 L. Ed. 2d 168; 1971 U.S. LEXIS 69

Case history
- Prior: United States v. Gillette, 420 F.2d 298 (2d Cir. 1970); cert. granted, 399 U.S. 925 (1970); Negre v. Larsen, 418 F.2d 908 (9th Cir. 1969); cert. granted, 399 U.S. 925 (1970)

Holding
- Section 6(j) of the Military Selective Service Act of 1967 exempts from military service conscientious objectors who oppose participation in all war, but not those who object only to participation in a particular war. Limiting the exemption in this manner does not violate the Establishment or Free Exercise Clauses of the First Amendment.

Court membership
- Chief Justice Warren E. Burger Associate Justices Hugo Black · William O. Douglas; John M. Harlan II · William J. Brennan Jr. Potter Stewart · Byron White; Thurgood Marshall · Harry Blackmun

Case opinions
- Majority: Marshall, joined by Burger, Harlan, Brennan, Stewart, White, Blackmun; Black (Part I)
- Concurrence: Black
- Dissent: Douglas

Laws applied
- Military Selective Service Act of 1967 § 6(j); U.S. Const. amend. I

Gillette v. United States, 401 U.S. 437 (1971), was a United States Supreme Court case concerning conscientious objection to a particular war. Decided together with Negre v. Larsen, the Court held that § 6(j) of the Military Selective Service Act exempted from military service those conscientiously opposed to participation in all wars, but not those who objected only to a particular war, even where the selective objection was based on sincere religious beliefs. The Court also rejected claims that this distinction violated the Establishment Clause or Free Exercise Clause of the First Amendment.

== Background ==
Section 6(j) of the Military Selective Service Act provided an exemption from combatant military service for a person who, "by reason of religious training and belief, is conscientiously opposed to participation in war in any form". During the 1960s, the Supreme Court interpreted the statute's requirement of "religious training and belief" increasingly broadly.

In United States v. Seeger (1965), the Court held that a conscientious objector need not adhere to a traditional belief in God. A sincere and meaningful belief could qualify if it occupied in the individual's life a place parallel to that occupied by belief in God in a traditionally religious person. In Welsh v. United States (1970), the Court extended that reasoning to deeply held moral or ethical beliefs that the registrant himself did not characterize as religious.

Both decisions, however, involved conscientious opposition to participation in all war. Gillette presented the distinct question whether the statutory exemption also protected a person whose sincere conscientious or religious objection extended only to a particular conflict. The Supreme Court later emphasized in Gillette that the issue was not whether the petitioners' beliefs were sufficiently "religious" under Seeger and Welsh, but whether an objection to one particular war satisfied the separate statutory requirement of opposition to "war in any form".

== Consolidated cases ==
Guy Porter Gillette was convicted of willfully failing to report for induction into the armed forces. Gillette described his position as based on a "humanist approach to religion". He opposed American participation in the Vietnam War, which he considered unjust, but stated that he would be willing to participate in a war of national defense or in a United Nations peacekeeping operation. His application for conscientious-objector status was rejected because his beliefs were directed against the Vietnam War rather than against all war. The United States Court of Appeals for the Second Circuit affirmed his conviction.

The Court considered Gillette's case together with Negre v. Larsen. Louis A. Negre, a devout Roman Catholic, had been inducted into the Army and completed infantry training before receiving orders for service in Vietnam. After concluding that participation in the Vietnam War would violate his religious understanding of the distinction between a just and unjust war, Negre sought discharge as a conscientious objector. His application was denied because his objection was directed toward the Vietnam conflict rather than war generally. Negre sought a writ of habeas corpus, but the denial of relief was affirmed by the United States Court of Appeals for the Ninth Circuit.

In both cases, the sincerity and religious character of the petitioners' convictions were accepted for purposes of the litigation. The issue was whether selective conscientious objection came within the statutory exemption and, if it did not, whether exclusion of selective objectors was constitutional.

== Decision of the Court ==
Justice Thurgood Marshall delivered the opinion of the Court. The Court interpreted the statutory phrase "conscientiously opposed to participation in war in any form" to require opposition to participation in all war. Marshall reasoned that, whether "in any form" modified "war" or "participation", the provision could not naturally be read to encompass an objection limited to one particular conflict.

The Court distinguished Seeger and Welsh. Those cases had concerned what kinds of conscientious beliefs could qualify as "religious training and belief"; they had not eliminated the separate statutory requirement that the claimant oppose participation in all wars. The Court therefore held that a selective objector fell outside § 6(j) even where the objection to a particular war was sincere and religious in character.

The Court also rejected the petitioners' constitutional arguments. It held that limiting the exemption to objectors to all wars did not violate the Establishment Clause because the distinction did not favor particular religious denominations or theological beliefs and could be justified by neutral governmental concerns. Among these, the Court emphasized fairness and administrability in a system of conscription, including the difficulties involved in determining which particular wars were sufficiently objectionable and distributing the burdens of military service among those subject to the draft.

The Court likewise rejected the Free Exercise Clause challenge. It concluded that § 6(j) was not designed to interfere with religious practice or penalize a particular theological position, and that any incidental burden imposed upon selective objectors was justified by substantial governmental interests associated with raising and administering the armed forces.

Justice Hugo Black concurred in the judgment and in the statutory interpretation portion of Marshall's opinion.

== Dissent ==
Justice William O. Douglas dissented. In Gillette's case, Douglas argued that the constitutional protection of conscience should not depend upon whether an individual's moral or religious objection extended to every conceivable war. He viewed Gillette's humanist beliefs as sincere convictions of conscience and argued that forcing him to participate in a war he considered immoral implicated the protections of the First Amendment.

Douglas wrote separately concerning Negre, emphasizing the tradition of just war theory in Catholic moral teaching. He reasoned that Catholic doctrine could impose a religious obligation upon an individual to distinguish between just and unjust wars and to refuse participation in a war judged unjust. In Douglas's view, denying an exemption because Negre's religious beliefs did not require opposition to every war placed selective religious objectors at an unconstitutional disadvantage.

== Commentary ==
The decision attracted substantial contemporary academic commentary concerning selective conscientious objection. In the 1971 Supreme Court Review, legal scholar Kent Greenawalt described Gillette as marking the end of the Supreme Court's earlier expansion of protection for conscientious objectors beyond the categories expressly recognized by Congress, characterizing the decision as decisively rejecting both statutory and constitutional claims to an exemption for those opposed only to particular wars, while Philosopher David Malament devoted a 1972 article in Philosophy & Public Affairs to the constitutional and moral arguments surrounding selective conscientious objection and the Gillette decision.

A later reassessment, by law professor Andrew Haile, described the progression from the broader conception of religious belief recognized in Seeger and Welsh to the Court's refusal in Gillette to extend the exemption to selective conscientious objectors. Haile argued that the subsequent enactment of the Religious Freedom Restoration Act could alter the legal analysis if a military draft were reinstated and an objector asserted a genuinely religious objection to a particular war.
