= Dandridge v. Williams =

- Supreme Court of the United States

Argued December 9, 1969 Decided April 6, 1970
- Full case name: Dandridge v. Williams
- Citations: 397 U.S. 471 (more) 90 S. Ct. 1153; 25 L. Ed. 2d 491; 1970 U.S. LEXIS 84

Case history
- Prior: Williams v. Dandridge, 297 F. Supp. 450 (D. Md. 1968); probable jurisdiction noted, 396 U.S. 811, order rescinded in part, 396 U.S. 874 (1969).
- Subsequent: Rehearing denied, 398 U.S. 914 (1970).

Holding
- The State of Maryland's regulation of capping welfare at $250 a month regardless of family size or need does not violate the Equal Protection Clause of the Fourteenth Amendment.

Court membership
- Chief Justice Warren E. Burger Associate Justices Hugo Black · William O. Douglas; John M. Harlan II · William J. Brennan Jr. Potter Stewart · Byron White; Thurgood Marshall

Case opinions
- Majority: Stewart, joined by Burger, Black, Harlan, White
- Concurrence: Black, joined by Burger
- Concurrence: Harlan
- Dissent: Douglas, joined by Brennan
- Dissent: Marshall, joined by Brenann

Dandridge v. Williams, 397 U.S. 471 (1970), was a United States Supreme Court case based on the Equal Protection Clause of the Fourteenth Amendment. It held that a state can cap welfare based on the Aid to Families with Dependent Children at $250.00 per month regardless of the family's size or need. The plaintiffs were attempting to make the amount variable based on size.

== Background ==
Appellees, large-family recipients of benefits under the Aid to Families With Dependent Children (AFDC) program, brought this suit to enjoin the application of Maryland's maximum grant regulation as contravening the Social Security Act of 1935 and the Equal Protection Clause of the Fourteenth Amendment. Under the program, which is jointly financed by the Federal and State Governments, a State computes the "standard of need" of eligible family units. Under the Maryland regulation, though most families are provided aid in accordance with the standard of need, a ceiling of about $250 per month is imposed on an AFDC grant regardless of the size of the family and its actual need. The United States District Court for the District of Maryland held the regulation "invalid on its face for overreaching," and thus violative of the Equal Protection Clause.

== Decision ==
The Supreme Court reversed the district court's ruling of the regulation being prohibited by the Social Security Act and its violating of the Equal Protection Clause. The standard of, "shall be furnished with reasonable promptness to all eligible individuals," laid out in the Social Security Act was not found to penalize large families, but instead to reduce all family grants, no matter the size. The Court also cited King v. Smith as an example of how a state can appropriate funds, saying they recognize that Maryland is doing all they can in order to provide as much welfare as they can, therefore they are not violating the Social Security Act of 1935. In terms of the Equal Protection Clause, the Court found that the district court's ruling of "overreaching" was not relative to social and economic factors a state handles. The "overreaching" (or 'overbreadth' as the opinions called it) was only applicable in First Amendment related cases.

=== Concurrences ===
In his concurrence, Justice Hugo Black added the point that as long as the Secretary of Health, Education, and Welfare recognizes that a state is doing all that it can in allocation, then that state can not be held liable for such low appropriations. Also in concurrence, Justice John Harlan argued that a state's social and economic policies are not affected by such racial policies outlined in the Equal Protection Clause.

== See also ==
- List of United States Supreme Court cases, volume 397
- Shapiro v. Thompson, 394 U.S. 618 (1969)
- Katzenbach v. Morgan, 384 U.S. 641 (1966)
- King v. Smith, 392 U.S. 309 (1968)
