= Phoenix v. Kolodziejski =

City of Phoenix v. Kolodziejski
- Supreme Court of the United States

Argued March 31, 1970 Decided June 23, 1970
- Full case name: City of Phoenix v. Emily Kolodziejski
- Docket no.: 1066
- Citations: 399 U.S. 204 (more) 90 S. Ct. 1990; 26 L. Ed. 2d 523
- Argument: Oral argument

Case history
- Prior: Injunction granted, Kolodziejski v. City of Phoenix, 313 F. Supp. 209 (D. Ariz. 1969); probable jurisdiction noted, 397 U.S. 903 (1970)

Court membership
- Chief Justice Warren E. Burger Associate Justices Hugo Black · William O. Douglas; John M. Harlan II · William J. Brennan Jr. Potter Stewart · Byron White; Thurgood Marshall · Harry Blackmun

Case opinions
- Majority: White, joined by Douglas, Brennan, Marshall (in full); Black (in judgment and in Part I of the opinion of the Court)
- Dissent: Stewart, joined by Burger, Harlan
- Blackmun took no part in the consideration or decision of the case.

Phoenix v. Kolodziejski, 399 U.S. 204 (1970), was a voting rights case decided by the United States Supreme Court in 1970.

== Facts ==
The City of Phoenix held an election in June 1969, in which the issuance of general obligation bonds to finance various municipal improvements was approved. Under Arizona law, only real property taxpayers were permitted to vote. Six days after the election, the U.S. Supreme Court held, in Cipriano v. City of Houma, that restricting the franchise to property taxpayers in elections on revenue bonds violated the Equal Protection Clause. In August 1969, Emily Kolodziejski, who owned no realty, challenged the franchise restriction and attacked the validity of the June election. The District Court, finding no significant difference between revenue bonds and general obligation bonds, held the nonproperty owner exclusion unconstitutional. It declared the June bond election invalid, since the authorization for the issuance of the bonds was not final on the date of the Cipriano decision.

== Result ==
The Supreme Court unanimously affirmed, holding that the Equal Protection Clause prohibits states from restricting the franchise to real property taxpayers in elections to approve the issuance of general obligation bonds, as the differences between the interests of property owners and nonproperty owners are not sufficiently substantial to justify excluding the latter from voting. The decision was held to apply only to authorizations for general obligation bonds that are not final as of the date of the decision.

Justice Harry Blackmun took no part in the consideration or decision of the case.
