= Elizabeth Watson =

Elizabeth or Liz Watson may refer to:

- Elizabeth Lowe Watson (1842–1927), American lecturer and suffragist
- Lizzie Allen Harker (1863–1933), née Watson, English author
- Bessie Watson (1900–1992), Scottish child suffragette and piper
- Elizabeth G. Watson (1914–2006), American Quaker minister, curator, and feminist theologian
- Betty Jane Watson (Elizabeth Jane Watson, 1921–2016), American actress and singer
- Elizabeth Watson (police officer), American police chief
- Liz Watson (politician) (born 1975), American lawyer and former candidate for US Congress
- Liz Watson (netball) (born 1994), Australian netball player
- Elizabeth Watson, English person convicted of contempt of court, see Freeman on the land movement#Court cases
- Elizabeth Watson (Shortland Street), television character
