= QUF =

Quf or QUF may refer to:

- Quaker Universalist Fellowship
- Queensland United Foods, predecessor to Pauls (dairy)
- quf, alternate transliteration of the Hebrew letter Qof (ק)
