= Baldwin v. New York =

- Supreme Court of the United States

Argued Dec 9, 1969 Decided June 22, 1970
- Full case name: Robert Baldwin v. State of New York
- Citations: 399 U.S. 66 (more) 90 S. Ct. 1886; 26 L. Ed. 2d 437
- Argument: Oral argument

Case history
- Prior: Hogan v. Rosenberg, 58 Misc. 2d 585, 296 N.Y.S.2d 584 (Sup. Ct. 1968); Affirmed in part, reversed in part, 24 N.Y.2d 207, 247 N.E.2d 260 (1969); Reargument denied sub. nom., People v. Baldwin, 27 N.Y.2d 737, 262 N.E.2d 683 (1970); Probable jurisdiction noted, Baldwin v. New York, 395 U.S. 932 (1969)

Holding
- A defendant accused of a serious offense must be afforded the right to a trial by jury, while a petty offense does not give a defendant a right to a jury trial.

Court membership
- Chief Justice Warren E. Burger Associate Justices Hugo Black · William O. Douglas; John M. Harlan II · William J. Brennan Jr. Potter Stewart · Byron White; Thurgood Marshall · Harry Blackmun

Case opinions
- Majority: White, joined by Brennan and Marshall
- Concurrence: Black, joined by Douglas
- Dissent: Burger
- Blackmun took no part in the consideration or decision of the case.

Laws applied
- Sixth Amendment to the United States Constitution

Baldwin v. New York, 399 U.S. 66 (1970), was a decision of the U.S. Supreme Court in which the Court ruled that defendants have a Sixth Amendment right to a jury trial for offenses that are punishable by imprisonment for more than six months.

== Background ==
Robert Baldwin was arrested in New York City for "jostling". Under the New York City Criminal Court Act, his trial was conducted without a jury, despite his request for a jury trial. Baldwin was convicted and sentenced to one year in prison, following which he appealed the case, arguing that the Sixth Amendment to the United States Constitution granted him the right to a jury trial.

=== Duncan v. Louisiana ===
In 1968, the Warren court incorporated the Sixth Amendment right to a jury trial and applied it to the states. In Duncan, the defendant had been convicted of battery, which under Louisiana law was punishable by up to two years in prison. The majority opinion, authored by Justice Byron White, noted that in 49 of the 50 states, "petty offenses" were punishable by no more than one year in jail. Therefore, a crime with a possible two-year sentence was out of step with the common law definition of "petty", thus necessitating a right to trial by jury.

== Decision ==
The majority opinion, authored by Justice Byron White, narrowed the decision of Duncan v. Louisiana by holding that a right to a jury trial is required for all crimes where the possible penalty exceeds six months imprisonment. The opinion explicitly disagreed with the prosecution's argument that the line should be drawn between misdemeanor and felony, and noted that every other state had reduced punishment for non-jury trials to no more than six months.
