= Illinois v. Allen =

- Supreme Court of the United States

Argued February 24, 1970 Decided March 31, 1970
- Full case name: Illinois, petitioner v. William Allen, respondent
- Docket no.: 606
- Citations: 397 U.S. 337 (more)

Questions presented
- May a defendant, by his own unruly conduct, forfeit his right to be present at trial?

Holding
- 1. A stubbornly defiant criminal defendant may forfeit, by his conduct, the right to be present at his trial.; 2. In response to a stubbornly defiant defendant, a judge may (1) bind and gag him, (2) cite him for criminal or civil contempt, or (3) remove him from the courtroom.

Court membership
- Chief Justice Warren E. Burger Associate Justices Hugo Black · William O. Douglas; John M. Harlan II · William J. Brennan Jr. Potter Stewart · Byron White; Thurgood Marshall

Case opinions
- Majority: Black, joined by Burger, Harlan, Brennan, Stewart, White, Marshall
- Concurrence: Brennan
- Concur/dissent: Douglas

Laws applied
- U.S. Const. amends. VI, XIV

Illinois v. Allen, 397 U.S. 337 (1970), was a decision by the Supreme Court of the United States regarding the removal of an unruly criminal defendant during his trial. In its decision, the court ruled that a trial judge may remove a stubbornly defiant defendant from the courtroom, following a warning from the judge that he will be removed if his disruptive behavior continues. Additionally, the court outlined other remedies available to judges faced with such conduct.

== Background ==
On August 12, 1965, William Allen entered a bar in Illinois. After ordering a drink, he robbed the bartender of $200 (equivalent to $2043 in 2026 dollars) while holding him at gunpoint. Allen was later arrested and charged with armed robbery.

During the trial, Allen elected to represent himself, though he retained standby counsel appointed by the trial judge. During jury selection, Allen began arguing with the judge using profane language and behaving in a highly disrespectful manner. The judge therefore ordered Allen's standby counsel to proceed with the jury selection instead of Allen himself; Allen responded by directing a death threat to the judge and tearing up his standby counsel's papers. The judge warned Allen that continued interruptions would result in his removal from the courtroom, but Allen ignored the warning and continued to engage in disruptive behavior. The judge subsequently ordered Allen's removal from the courtroom and the jury selection proceeded in his absence.

Following the conclusion of jury selection, the judge allowed Allen to return to the courtroom for the trial, but after Allen continued to engage in disruptive behavior, he was again removed. Allen's appointed counsel represented him while he was not allowed in the courtroom, which was primarily during the presentation of the state's case. Later, having assured the judge that he would reform his conduct, Allen was allowed to return to the courtroom while his attorneys presented the defense's case. The jury subsequently found Allen guilty of armed robbery and he was sentenced to serve 10 to 30 years in state prison.

Following the affirmation of his conviction by the Supreme Court of Illinois, Allen filed a petition for a writ of habeas corpus in federal court, saying that his rights afforded to him by the Sixth and Fourteenth Amendments to confront adverse witnesses had been denied due to his removal from the courtroom. The District Court declined to issue the writ. Later, the Court of Appeals reversed, saying that the right to be present at one's own trial is so absolute that no defendant, regardless of his conduct, can be held to have forfeited it so long as he insisted on it, as Allen had done. An appeal was sought by the state of Illinois.

== Opinion of the Court ==
The court held that a defendant may lose his right to be present at his own trial if, following warnings from the judge that he will be removed if his disruptive behavior persists, he nonetheless insists on conducting himself in a manner inconsistent with the continuance of the trial. The defendant may, however, reclaim his right to be present as soon as he pledges to conduct himself in a manner befitting a criminal courtroom.

Additionally, the court affirms that judges may use their own discretion when confronted with a stubbornly defiant defendant, saying that there are "at least three" constitutionally permissible remedies for a judge in dealing with such a defendant. The judge may:

- Bind and gag the defendant, thus keeping him present in the courtroom.
- Cite the defendant for criminal or civil contempt.
- Remove him from the courtroom until he pledges to reform his conduct.

The opinion affirmed the discretion exercised by the trial judge in the original case, and reversed the lower circuit court's opinion.

== Notable invocations ==
During the Waukesha Christmas parade attack trial, Judge Jennifer Dorow repeatedly cited the Supreme Court's decision in Allen as her authority to remove the defendant, Darrell Brooks, from her courtroom, after she had warned him that this could happen. During this trial, Brooks was often disruptive, and at times belligerent, toward the judge and prosecution, and was frequently removed from the courtroom for his behavior.
