= Mora v. McNamara =

- Supreme Court of the United States

Decided November 6, 1967
- Full case name: Dennis Mora, et al., petitioners v. Robert S. McNamara, Secretary of Defense, et al.
- Citations: 389 U.S. 934 (more) 88 S. Ct. 282; 19 L. Ed. 2d 287

Court membership
- Chief Justice Earl Warren Associate Justices Hugo Black · William O. Douglas; John M. Harlan II · William J. Brennan Jr. Potter Stewart · Byron White; Abe Fortas · Thurgood Marshall

s
- Dissent: Stewart, joined by Douglas
- Dissent: Douglas, joined by Stewart
- Marshall took no part in the consideration or decision of the case.

Mora v. McNamara, 389 U.S. 934 (1967), is a case in which the United States Supreme Court was asked to rule on the case of a conscientious objector (a member of the Fort Hood Three) who claimed that the U.S. war against Vietnam was an illegal war of aggression. In this case, the court cited only the Kellogg-Briand Pact, Article 39 of the United Nations Charter and the Treaty of London (which established the Nuremberg War Crimes Tribunal) as the relevant body of international law regarding cases of war.

Certiorari was denied over the dissents of Justices Stewart and Douglas.

== See also ==
- List of United States Supreme Court cases, volume 389
- Gunn v. University Committee to End the War in Viet Nam
- Lloyd Corp. v. Tanner
