= Mitchell v. Donovan =

- Supreme Court of the United States

Argued April 21, 1970 Decided June 15, 1970
- Full case name: Mitchell, et al. v. Donovan, Secretary of State of Minnesota, et al.
- Citations: 398 U.S. 427 (more) 90 S. Ct. 1763; 26 L. Ed. 2d 378; 1970 U.S. LEXIS 26

Case history
- Prior: 300 F. Supp. 1145 (D. Minn. 1969) (vacated and remanded)

Court membership
- Chief Justice Warren E. Burger Associate Justices Hugo Black · William O. Douglas; John M. Harlan II · William J. Brennan Jr. Potter Stewart · Byron White; Thurgood Marshall · Harry Blackmun

Case opinions
- Per curiam
- Concurrence: Black
- Dissent: Douglas
- Blackmun took no part in the consideration or decision of the case.

Mitchell v. Donovan, 398 U.S. 427 (1970), was a United States Supreme Court case.

== Background ==
=== Facts ===
The 1968 Communist Party candidates for President and Vice President of the United States, various Minnesota voters who alleged a desire to vote for those candidates, and the Communist Parties of the United States and of Minnesota were denied request to be placed on ballot for 1968 election in Minnesota, pursuant to the Communist Control Act of 1954, 50 U.S.C.S. §§ 841-42.

=== Claim ===
They brought an action in the United States District Court for the District of Minnesota seeking a declaration that the Communist Control Act of 1954 (50 USC 841–842) was constitutionally invalid, and praying for a temporary restraining order and permanent injunction requiring the secretary of state of Minnesota to include the names of the plaintiff candidates on the November 1968 ballot.

=== District court ===
A three-judge panel convened pursuant to 28 U.S.C.S. § 2282.

Without deciding the merits of the claims, the three- judge District Court granted the injunction, ordering that the names of the plaintiff candidates be placed on the November 1968 ballot (290 F Supp 642).

After the election, the Federal District Court, finding no present case or controversy, denied appellants' request for a declaratory judgment striking down the Communist Control Act, on which the state authorities had relied in refusing ballot placement:

- it held that the prayer for injunctive relief, which referred only to the 1968 election and requested no injunction as to future conduct, had been rendered moot by the passing of that election.
- As to the prayer for a declaratory judgment striking down the Communist Control Act, the court found no present case or controversy, and therefore dismissed the complaint (300 F Supp 1145).

=== Certiorari and arguments ===
Appellants brought a direct appeal to this Court under 28 U. S. C. § 1253, which permits an "appeal to the Supreme Court from an order granting or denying . . . an interlocutory or permanent injunction . . . ."

== Opinion of the court ==
On direct appeal, the United States Supreme Court, in a per curiam opinion representing six members of the court, vacated the judgment and remanded the case.

Held: An order granting or denying only a declaratory judgment may not be appealed to this Court under § 1253. Rockefeller v. Catholic Medical Center, 397 U.S. 820. It was held that the court lacked jurisdiction under 28 USC 1253, which provides for direct appeal to the Supreme Court from a three-judge Federal District Court order granting or denying "an interlocutory or permanent injunction," because the order appealed from did not grant or deny an injunction, but did no more than deny the plaintiffs a declaratory judgment striking down the Communist Control Act.

=== Concurrence ===
Black concurred in the result.

=== Dissent ===
Douglas, dissenting, stated that the refusal of a declaratory judgment might be as definitive an adjudication as the refusal of an injunction, and that a properly convened three-judge Federal District Court's order granting or denying an injunction "or its equivalent" was appealable under 1253.
