= Boykin v. Alabama =

- Supreme Court of the United States

Argued March 4, 1969 Decided June 2, 1969
- Full case name: Boykin v. Alabama
- Citations: 395 U.S. 238 (more) 89 S. Ct. 1709; 23 L. Ed. 2d 274

Court membership
- Chief Justice Earl Warren Associate Justices Hugo Black · William O. Douglas; John M. Harlan II · William J. Brennan Jr. Potter Stewart · Byron White; Thurgood Marshall

Case opinions
- Majority: Douglas, joined by Warren, Brennan, Stewart, White, Marshall
- Dissent: Harlan, joined by Black

Boykin v. Alabama, 395 U.S. 238 (1969), is a United States Supreme Court case in which the Court determined that when a defendant enters into a plea bargain, they waive their Sixth Amendment right to a trial by jury. A defendant may not waive this Constitutional right unless he does so knowingly, voluntarily and intelligently. The defendant was an African-American charged with robbery, which carried a death sentence in Alabama at the time. He pled guilty.

== Holdings ==
The Court first held that it had jurisdiction to review the voluntary character of the plea, given the ongoing state court review. The case was already before the state court under Alabama's automatic appeal statute. That court was reviewing the trial judge's acceptance of petitioner's guilty plea, absent an affirmative showing that the plea was intelligent and voluntary.

The Court then held that a waiver of the Fifth Amendment privilege against self-incrimination and the right to trial by jury cannot be presumed from a silent record.

The Court then held that acceptance of the petitioner's guilty plea in the case was a reversible error since the record failed to disclose that the petitioner appropriately entered his plea of guilty.
