= United States v. Sisson =

- Supreme Court of the United States

Argued January 20–21, 1970 Decided June 29, 1970
- Full case name: United States v. Sisson
- Citations: 399 U.S. 267 (more) 90 S. Ct. 2117; 26 L. Ed. 2d 608

Case history
- Prior: United States v. Sisson, 297 F. Supp. 902 (D. Mass. 1969)

Court membership
- Chief Justice Warren E. Burger Associate Justices Hugo Black · William O. Douglas; John M. Harlan II · William J. Brennan Jr. Potter Stewart · Byron White; Thurgood Marshall · Harry Blackmun

Case opinions
- Majority: Harlan, joined by Brennan, Stewart, Marshall; Black (only as to II-C)
- Dissent: Burger, joined by Douglas, White
- Dissent: White, joined by Burger, Douglas
- Blackmun took no part in the consideration or decision of the case.

United States v. Sisson, 399 U.S. 267 (1970), was a legal case decided by the United States Supreme Court in 1970. The case is related to Selective Service law.

In this case, the jury recorded a verdict of guilt, but the judge then ordered an acquittal. The government appealed, but the Supreme Court held that the government had no power to appeal a verdict of acquittal, no matter how wrong the legal basis was for the acquittal.

Sisson was "the first important case won by a selective conscientious objector", a person who asserted that they were not opposed to serving in a war generally, but objected to serving in a specific war which they believed to be immoral.
