= Ashe v. Swenson =

- Supreme Court of the United States

Argued November 13, 1969 Decided April 6, 1970
- Full case name: Bob Fred Ashe, Petitioner v. Harold R. Swenson, Warden
- Citations: 397 U.S. 436 (more) 90 S. Ct. 1189; 25 L. Ed. 2d 469; 1970 U.S. LEXIS 54

Holding
- The Double Jeopardy Clause embodies collateral estoppel as a constitutional requirement. Where a jury bases a judgment of acquittal on a finding that the defendant did not participate in the offense charged, this issue may not be relitigated in another trial.

Court membership
- Chief Justice Warren E. Burger Associate Justices Hugo Black · William O. Douglas; John M. Harlan II · William J. Brennan Jr. Potter Stewart · Byron White; Thurgood Marshall

Case opinions
- Majority: Stewart, joined by Black, Douglas, Harlan, Brennan, White, Marshall
- Concurrence: Black
- Concurrence: Harlan
- Concurrence: Brennan, joined by Douglas, Marshall
- Dissent: Burger
- This case overturned a previous ruling or rulings
- Hoag v. New Jersey (1958)

Ashe v. Swenson, 397 U.S. 436 (1970), was a decision by the United States Supreme Court, which held that "when an issue of ultimate fact has once been determined by a valid and final judgment, that issue cannot again be litigated between the same parties in any future lawsuit." The Double Jeopardy Clause prevents a state from relitigating a question already decided in favor of a defendant at a previous trial. Here, the guarantee against double jeopardy enforceable through the Fifth Amendment provided that where the defendant was acquitted of robbing one victim, the government could not prosecute the criminal defendant in a second trial for a different victim in the same robbery.

== Background ==
After a group of masked robbers committed armed robbery of a poker game in Lee's Summit, Missouri, Bob Fred Ashe was indicted on six separate counts of committing an armed robbery of one of the six players. At trial, a jury returned a general verdict of not guilty "due to insufficient evidence". Six weeks later, Ashe was brought to trial for the robbery of another of the poker players. This time, a prosecution witness who did not confidently identify Ashe as a robber was not called, and several witnesses expressed greater confidence that Ashe was the robber. At the conclusion of the trial, Ashe was found guilty and sentenced to thirty-five years.

The Missouri Supreme Court affirmed the conviction, holding no former jeopardy violation. After the federal district court denied habeas corpus relief, the Eighth Circuit Court of Appeals affirmed.

== Supreme Court ==
Ashe petitioned for a writ of certiorari in the Supreme Court, which was granted. His case before the Supreme Court was presented pro bono by noted Washington attorney and former Secretary of Defense Clark M. Clifford. The state's case was argued by Gene E. Voigts, First Assistant Attorney General of Missouri.

The Supreme Court concluded from the record of the prior trial that the "single rationally conceivable issue in dispute before the jury was whether [Ashe] had been one of the robbers. And the jury by its verdict found that he had not. The federal rule of law, therefore, would make a second prosecution for the robbery . . . wholly impermissible."

Because the first jury, by its verdict, had rejected the claim that Ashe was one of the robbers, the Supreme Court held that the State could not "constitutionally hail him before a new jury to litigate that issue again."

== See also ==
- List of United States Supreme Court cases, volume 397
- Waller v. Florida (1970)
