= Communist Control Act of 1954 =

1954 U.S. law criminalizing membership in communist organizations and supporting them

- Long title: An Act to outlaw the Communist Party, to prohibit members of Communist organizations from serving in certain representative capacities, and for other purposes.
- Acronyms (colloquial): CCA
- Enacted by: the 83rd United States Congress
- Effective: August 24, 1954

Citations
- Public law: 83-637
- Statutes at Large: 68 Stat. 775

Codification
- Titles amended: 50 U.S.C.: War and National Defense
- U.S.C. sections created: 50 U.S.C. ch. 23, subch. IV § 841 et seq.

Legislative history
- Introduced in the Senate as S. 3706 by John Marshall Butler (R–MD) on July 6, 1954; Committee consideration by Senate Judiciary; Passed the Senate on August 12, 1954 (85–0); Passed the House on August 16, 1954 (305–2); Reported by the joint conference committee on August 19, 1954; agreed to by the Senate on August 19, 1954 (79–0) and by the House on August 19, 1954 (266–2); Signed into law by President Dwight D. Eisenhower on August 24, 1954

The Communist Control Act of 1954 (68 Stat. 775, 50 U.S.C. §§ 841–844) is an American law signed by President Dwight Eisenhower on August 24, 1954, that outlawed the Communist Party USA and criminalized membership in or support for the party or "Communist-action organizations", on the basis that communists allegedly vowed to overthrow the government of the United States. The act also defines evidence to be considered by a jury in determining participation in the activities, planning, actions, objectives, or purposes of such organizations.

== Background ==
Created during the period of the Second Red Scare (1946–1954), the act was one of many bills drafted with the intention of protecting the American government from the supposed threat posed by international communists. During this time, some argued "the pursuit of subversive aims even by peaceful means should be outlawed." Thus, many opposed communism because of its explicitly declared and historically demonstrable goal to undermine liberal democracy. In the words of Ernest van den Haag, there was "no place in democracy for those who want to abolish [it] even with a peaceful vote".

== Act ==
The Communist Control Act of 1954 was originally proposed as an amendment to the Internal Security Act of 1950, which had sought to combat the spread of communism in labor unions. Apart from its secondary focus which concentrated on the illegality of "communist front organizations" (i.e. labor unions), the bill was drafted with the intention of tackling the root of pro-communist sentiment in the United States: the Communist Party. In its second section, the Communist Control Act characterized the Communist Party as an "agency of a hostile foreign power". The party was described as an "instrumentality of a conspiracy to overthrow the government" and a "clear, present, and continuing danger to the security of the United States".

The act made membership in the Communist Party a criminal act and stipulated all party members would be sanctioned with up to a $10,000 fine or imprisonment for five years or both if they failed to register with the U.S. Attorney General as such. Additionally, according to the third section, the Communist Party would be deprived of "the rights, privileges, and immunities of a legal body".

The Internal Security Act of 1950 had defined two types of "communist organizations". Republican Senator Hugh A. Butler of Nebraska later proposed a bill aimed at the removal of Communists from leadership positions in labor unions by designating "communist-infiltrated organizations" as a third class of communist organization. Afterward, Democratic Senator Hubert Humphrey of Minnesota put forward a substitute bill with the intention of sanctioning Communist Party members. Through an amendment by Democratic Senator Price Daniel of Texas, both the Butler and Humphrey bills were merged into one. The final version of the bill was passed unanimously in the Senate. The House of Representatives also made additions to the bill, including a section which listed the criteria for "determining what constitutes membership in the [Communist] Party and related organizations".

== Support ==
The overwhelming support provided by the liberals has attracted much attention from historians such as Mary McAuliffe (The Journal of American History). McAuliffe argues that the perceived gravity of the threat of Communism during the Cold War led some liberals to ignore the fact that the CCA suspended the citizenship rights of the Communist Party members. Most liberal Democrats did not even offer a token opposition to the act; on the contrary, they ardently supported it.

McAuliffe further acknowledges that the act "served to avert possible disaster for individual politicians" who feared being labeled as Communists for their left-minded ideas. In the words of Senator Humphrey, "the amendment [was sought] to remove any doubt in the Senate as to where [Democrats and liberals] [stood] on the issue of Communism." An article published in the Michigan Law Review in 1955 suggested that the Communist Control Act was a "dramatic political gesture" rather than a genuine attempt to "kill Communism at its root."

McAuliffe underlines the anomalies surrounding the act; in particular, the act was unorthodox since it bypassed the usual process of committee hearings and deliberations and was immediately introduced to the Senate floor. The act has no recorded legislated history, undoubtedly because it was rush-printed in the early hours of the morning. In 1955, an outraged American Civil Liberties Union characterized it as "a mockery of... [Americans'] most basic constitutional guarantees." Mary S. McAuliffe commented that use of the Communist Control Act of 1954 was an illustration of "how deeply McCarthyism penetrated American society."

== Controversy ==
There was much controversy surrounding the act. The Federal Bureau of Investigation and its director, J. Edgar Hoover, opposed the bill on the count that it would have forced the Communist movement underground. In addition, the Michigan Law Review argued that the politically charged Act was plagued by a number of constitutional problems which would have undermined its effectiveness. The Yale Law Journal lauded the act as the "most direct statutory attack on internal communism yet undertaken [by 1955] by Congress," but stressed the "haste and confusion" of the act's passage, which led to many "vague and ambiguous provisions".

The incongruity of its provisions, a grave constitutional defect, was in part attributed to obscure language. For example, the nature of the "rights, privileges, and immunities" to be terminated by the act was never explicitly stated as relating to state or federal jurisdiction. Also, the Yale Law Journal underlined a number of instances during which a literal interpretation of key passages would have caused entire sections to fall because of the use of comprehensive, unspecific language. McAuliffe notes that, because of these complications, the act was "never used as a major weapon in the legislative arsenal against Communism," apart from two minor cases in the states of New York and New Jersey.

== Litigation ==
In 1961, the Supreme Court of the United States ruled that the act did not bar the party from participating in New York's unemployment insurance system.

In the run-up to the 1972 United States presidential election in Arizona, several electors and candidates for the Communist Party U.S.A. attempted to create a new branch of the party within the state, but were refused, with state officials citing both Arizona and Federal law. On July 22, they filed suit, alleging that the statutes constituted bills of attainder, and therefore violated Article I, Section 9 of the Constitution of the United States. Additionally, they claimed that the statutes denied them due process rights under the Fifth and Fourteenth Amendments, and that they violated the Equal Protections Clause and the First Amendment. In 1973, Federal District Judge William Copple ruled that the statutes in question violated the Constitution of the United States and that Arizona could not keep the party off the ballot (Blawis v. Bolin).

== See also ==
- Mitchell v. Donovan
- Communist registration acts
- Smith Act trials of Communist Party leaders
- Espionage Act of 1917
- Anti-communism
