= Vale v. Louisiana =

- Supreme Court of the United States

Decided June 22, 1970
- Full case name: Vale v. Louisiana
- Citations: 399 U.S. 30 (more)

Holding
- A search of a suspect's house is not "incident to the arrest" when the suspect's arrest took place outside.

Court membership
- Chief Justice Warren E. Burger Associate Justices Hugo Black · William O. Douglas; John M. Harlan II · William J. Brennan Jr. Potter Stewart · Byron White; Thurgood Marshall · Harry Blackmun

Case opinions
- Majority: Stewart, joined by Douglas, Harlan, Brennan, White, Marshall
- Dissent: Black, joined by Burger
- Blackmun took no part in the consideration or decision of the case.

Laws applied
- Amendment IV

Vale v. Louisiana, 399 U.S. 30 (1970) was a search and seizure case decided by the United States Supreme Court in 1970, in which the Court held that a search of a suspect's house is not "incident to the arrest" when the suspect's arrest took place outside. The police officers therefore required a search warrant.

== Facts ==
Police officers, possessing warrants for appellant's arrest, were watching the house where he resided. They observed what they suspected was an exchange of narcotics between a known addict and appellant outside the house, after appellant had gone into the house and brought something out to the addict. They arrested appellant at the front steps and announced that they would search the house. A search of the then-unoccupied house disclosed narcotics in a bedroom. The Louisiana Supreme Court, affirming appellant's conviction for possessing heroin, held that the search did not violate the Fourth Amendment, as it occurred "in the immediate vicinity of the arrest" and was "substantially contemporaneous therewith." Consideration by this Court of the question of jurisdiction was postponed to the hearing of the case on the merits.

== Significance ==
With regards to the exclusionary rule, the police officers also claimed that exigent circumstances justified the warrantless search of the house: they claimed to be concerned that someone would have destroyed the narcotics in the home if they waited to get a search warrant. Vale demonstrates that courts are not supposed to engage in good faith analysis about search warrant exceptions. If police officers are wrong and there are no exigent circumstances present, then the search is illegal and the exclusionary rule applies to any collected evidence.

The case distinguished Chimel v. California, in which the Court had held that the warrantless search of a house can be justified as incident to a lawful arrest only if confined to the area within the arrestee's reach, were given retroactive effect.

Justice Black and Chief Justice Burger dissented. Justice Blackmun did not participate in the case.
