= Chambers v. Maroney =

- Supreme Court of the United States

Argued April 27, 1970 Decided June 22, 1970
- Full case name: Chambers v. Maroney, Correctional Superintendent
- Citations: 399 U.S. 42 (more) 90 S. Ct. 1975; 26 L. Ed. 2d 419

Case history
- Prior: 408 F.2d 1186 (3d Cir. 1969) (affirmed)

Court membership
- Chief Justice Warren E. Burger Associate Justices Hugo Black · William O. Douglas; John M. Harlan II · William J. Brennan Jr. Potter Stewart · Byron White; Thurgood Marshall · Harry Blackmun

Case opinions
- Majority: White, joined by Burger, Black, Douglas, Brennan, Stewart, Marshall
- Concurrence: Stewart
- Concur/dissent: Harlan
- Blackmun took no part in the consideration or decision of the case.

Laws applied
- U.S. Const. amend. IV

Chambers v. Maroney, 399 U.S. 42 (1970), was a United States Supreme Court case in which the Court applied the Carroll doctrine in a case with a significant factual difference—the search took place after the vehicle was moved to the stationhouse. The search was thus delayed and did not take place on the highway (or street) as in Carroll. After a gas station robbery, a vehicle fitting the description of the robbers' car was stopped. Inside were people wearing clothing matching the description of that worn by the robbers. They were arrested, and the car was taken to the police station where it was later searched.

== Opinion of the Court ==
The Court first held that the search could not be sustained as a search incident to arrest (SITA). It quoted at length from Carroll that a search of a movable vehicle is treated differently under the Fourth Amendment because the mobility of the vehicle alone can easily defeat the warrant requirement. If there is probable cause to believe the vehicle contains criminal evidence and there exist exigent circumstances where the vehicle can be removed from the jurisdiction, a warrantless search would be reasonable. It made no constitutional difference here that the search followed the seizure because the probable cause which developed on the street still existed at the station house (where the vehicle was impounded). For this purpose, it is significant to note that the automobile exception and the SITA doctrine are quite different.

== Aftermath ==
Companion cases, including Perini v. Colosimo, Crouse v. Wood, Hocker v. Heffley, and Kelley v. Arizona, were vacated in per curiam opinions and respectively remanded to the Sixth Circuit, Tenth Circuit, Ninth Circuit, and Arizona Supreme Court, "for further consideration in light of Chambers v. Maroney". In each case the per curiam opinion noted that Justice Harlan would have remanded "for the reasons stated in his separate opinion in Chambers".
