= Moragne v. States Marine Lines, Inc. =

- Supreme Court of the United States

Argued March 4, 1970 Decided June 15, 1970
- Full case name: Moragne v. States Marine Lines, Inc.
- Docket no.: 175
- Citations: 398 U.S. 375 (more)
- Argument: Oral argument

Holding
- An action does lie under general maritime law for death caused by violation of maritime duties.

Court membership
- Chief Justice Warren E. Burger Associate Justices Hugo Black · William O. Douglas; John M. Harlan II · William J. Brennan Jr. Potter Stewart · Byron White; Thurgood Marshall · Harry Blackmun

Case opinion
- Majority: Harlan, joined by Burger, Black, Douglas, Brennan, Stewart, White, Marshall
- Blackmun took no part in the consideration or decision of the case.

Moragne v. States Marine Lines, Inc., 398 U.S. 375 (1970) is a United States Supreme Court case addressing the remedies under federal maritime law for tortious deaths on state territorial waters.

== Facts ==
The petitioner's husband was a longshoreman on board the vessel Palmetto State when a hatch beam became disengaged and fell, striking the decedent in the head and causing his death. The petitioner brought suit as his widow and representative to recover damages for wrongful death from States Marine Lines, Inc., the owner of the vessel. The petitioner's based her claims upon negligence and the unseaworthiness of the vessel, alleging that a defective locking arrangement caused the hatch to fall. The Federal District Court for the Middle District of Florida determined that the applicable Florida wrongful death statute did not include the concept of unseaworthiness and dismissed the petitioner's claims. The Court of Appeals for the Fifth Circuit affirmed the District Court's dismissal, and the United States Supreme Court granted certiorari.

== Opinion ==
In a unanimous opinion delivered by Justice John M. Harlan II, the Supreme Court overruled the prior controlling case of The Harrisburg (1886), which denied recovery under general maritime law for wrongful death on navigable waters. In The Harrisburg the court had held that the common law doctrine of no recovery would be incorporated in toto into maritime law, which meant that no remedy was allowed for wrongful death in general maritime law unless there was some statute that specifically granted such a remedy. Moragne eliminated many of the disparities of maritime death law and allowed claimants to assert wrongful death claims based on unseaworthiness by authority of general maritime law independent of statutory reliance.

A companion case, Raskin v. P. D. Marchessini, Inc., was vacated and remanded to the Court of Appeals for reconsideration in light of Moragne.
