= United States v. ICC (1970) =

- Supreme Court of the United States

Argued October 21–22, 1969 Decided February 2, 1970
- Full case name: United States v. Interstate Commerce Commission
- Citations: 396 U.S. 491 (more)

Case history
- Prior: Certiorari to the United States District Court for the District of Columbia

Holding
- The ICC's approval of the merger of the Great Northern Railway Company and the Northern Pacific Railway Company did not violate antitrust laws.

Court membership
- Chief Justice Warren E. Burger Associate Justices Hugo Black · William O. Douglas; John M. Harlan II · William J. Brennan Jr. Potter Stewart · Byron White; Thurgood Marshall

Case opinion
- Majority: Burger, joined by Stewart, Brennan, White, Marshall, Black, Harlan
- Douglas took no part in the consideration or decision of the case.

United States v. ICC, 396 U.S. 491 (1970) was a United States Supreme Court case in which the Court held that a merger of the Great Northern Railway Company and the Northern Pacific Railway Company did not violate antitrust laws due to the benefits of increased savings and efficient transportation outweighing the costs of decreased competition and job loss. This decision is also called the Northern Lines Merger Case. (Note: Or the Northern Lines Merger Cases.)
