= Welsh v. United States =

1970 United States Supreme Court case on conscientious objection

- Supreme Court of the United States

Argued January 20, 1970 Decided June 15, 1970
- Full case name: Elliott Ashton Welsh II, Petitioner v. United States
- Docket no.: 76
- Citations: 398 U.S. 333 (more) 90 S. Ct. 1792; 26 L. Ed. 2d 308

Case history
- Prior: Conviction affirmed, United States v. Welsh, 404 F.2d 1078 (9th Cir. 1968); rehearing denied, January 31, 1969; cert. granted, 396 U.S. 816 (1969)

Holding
- Section 6(j) of the Universal Military Training and Service Act exempts from military service conscientious objectors whose opposition to war is based upon deeply held moral or ethical beliefs that occupy in their lives a place parallel to that filled by traditional religious convictions, even where they do not characterize those beliefs as religious.

Court membership
- Chief Justice Warren E. Burger Associate Justices Hugo Black · William O. Douglas; John M. Harlan II · William J. Brennan Jr. Potter Stewart · Byron White; Thurgood Marshall · Harry Blackmun

Case opinions
- Plurality: Black, joined by Douglas, Brennan, Marshall
- Concurrence: Harlan
- Dissent: White, joined by Burger, Stewart
- Blackmun took no part in the consideration or decision of the case.

Laws applied
- Universal Military Training and Service Act § 6(j), 50 U.S.C. App. § 456(j); U.S. Const. amend. I

Welsh v. United States, 398 U.S. 333 (1970), is a decision of the Supreme Court of the United States concerning conscientious objection to military service. In a 5–3 decision, the Court held that the statutory conscientious objector exemption extended to people whose opposition to participation in all wars rested on deeply held moral or ethical convictions, even when those convictions were not based on traditional religious beliefs.

The Court reversed Elliott Ashton Welsh II's conviction for refusing induction into the armed forces. Four justices, in a plurality opinion written by Hugo Black, concluded that Welsh qualified for exemption under the statute as interpreted in United States v. Seeger (1965). John Marshall Harlan II concurred in the judgment on constitutional grounds, concluding that excluding secular conscientious objectors from the exemption violated the Establishment Clause.

== Background ==
=== Statutory framework ===
The Selective Service Act of 1917 limited its conscientious objector provision to members of recognized religious organizations whose teachings prohibited participation in war. The Selective Training and Service Act of 1940 removed the membership requirement and instead referred to opposition to war arising from "religious training and belief".

Federal appellate courts subsequently differed over whether the exemption required belief in a deity. The Second Circuit adopted an interpretation encompassing certain humanitarian objections to war, while the Ninth Circuit required belief in obligations to a higher authority. In 1948, Congress defined "religious training and belief" in terms of an individual's relationship to a "Supreme Being", while excluding essentially political, sociological, or philosophical views and a merely personal moral code.

In the 1965 case of United States v. Seeger, the Supreme Court interpreted the exemption to encompass sincere and meaningful beliefs occupying a place in an individual's life parallel to that occupied by belief in God among traditional religious objectors. Belief in a Supreme Being in the conventional sense was therefore not necessary to qualify. Seeger had described his convictions as religious, although they rested on an ethical creed rather than orthodox belief in God.

Congress amended the statute in 1967, removing the reference to a Supreme Being but retaining the requirement of religious training and belief and the exclusions for political, sociological, or philosophical views and a merely personal moral code. Welsh's prosecution arose under the earlier version of the statute.

=== Welsh's beliefs and exemption applications ===
Welsh, a computer engineer living in Los Angeles, grew up in a household influenced by Christian Science and attended a Christian Science Sunday school. As a teenager, he encountered the writings of Bertrand Russell and rejected his earlier religious beliefs. His opposition to war developed further after conversations with peace activists in 1962. Although deaf in one ear, he passed military physical examinations.

Welsh applied for conscientious objector status in April 1964. On his application, he struck out the words "my religious training and" from the statement describing the basis of his opposition to war. His local draft board initially granted him exemption from combatant service. In May, he sought exemption from noncombatant service as well, explaining that he could not participate in the military system in any capacity.

Welsh did not belong to a religious organization and could neither affirm nor deny belief in a Supreme Being. His convictions developed through reading in history and sociology, and he regarded killing in war as morally wrong. Their sincerity was not disputed. Unlike Seeger, Welsh initially rejected a religious characterization of his convictions, grounding his opposition to war in the inherent value of human life.

=== Prosecution and appeals ===
After his claim for exemption from all military service was denied, Welsh reported for induction in December 1965 but refused to step forward. He was convicted in a bench trial of refusing induction in violation of 50 U.S.C. App. § 462(a). On June 1, 1966, he was sentenced to three years' imprisonment.

The Ninth Circuit affirmed by a 2–1 vote. The majority accepted the strength of Welsh's convictions but concluded that they lacked the religious basis required by the statute. Judge Frederick George Hamley dissented, arguing that the majority's interpretation raised constitutional difficulties and that Welsh's description of his beliefs reflected a misunderstanding of the statutory meaning of religion under Seeger.

The Supreme Court granted certiorari principally to consider whether Welsh's conviction was inconsistent with Seeger. The case was argued on January 20, 1970, and decided on June 15, 1970. Justice Harry Blackmun, who had joined the Court after oral argument, did not participate.

== Decision ==
The Supreme Court reversed Welsh's conviction by a 5–3 vote, holding that deeply and sincerely held moral or ethical beliefs could qualify an individual for the conscientious objector exemption even when the individual did not regard those beliefs as religious.

=== Plurality opinion ===
Justice Black wrote an opinion joined by Justices William O. Douglas, William J. Brennan Jr., and Thurgood Marshall. The plurality treated the case as controlled by Seeger and resolved it through statutory interpretation without deciding Welsh's constitutional challenge.

Under the plurality's interpretation, moral or ethical convictions could satisfy the statutory requirement when they functioned in the objector's life as traditional religious convictions did in the lives of religious objectors. An applicant's description of those convictions as nonreligious did not by itself disqualify the claim. The relevant convictions had to impose a duty of conscience against participation in any war and be held with the strength of traditional religious convictions.

The plurality also concluded that the statutory exclusions did not disqualify applicants merely because their objections were influenced by political views or considerations of public policy. It distinguished deeply held moral, ethical, or religious objections from opposition resting solely on policy, pragmatism, or expediency.

=== Concurrence ===
Justice Harlan supplied the fifth vote for reversal. He rejected the plurality's interpretation of congressional intent but concluded that the statutory distinction between religious and secular conscientious objections violated the Establishment Clause. Rather than invalidate the exemption entirely, he would extend it to people excluded because their convictions were secular.

=== Dissent ===
Justice Byron White dissented, joined by Chief Justice Warren E. Burger and Justice Potter Stewart. The dissent rejected the plurality's statutory interpretation but, unlike Harlan, concluded that Congress could constitutionally provide an exemption for religious objectors without extending it to secular objectors. White further argued that even if the religious limitation were unconstitutional, Welsh remained among those whom Congress had not intended to exempt.

== Subsequent developments ==
The Selective Service System subsequently issued regulations recognizing that religious and ethical beliefs could qualify for conscientious objector status. The regulations excluded claims resting solely on policy, pragmatism, expediency, or the applicant's self-interest or well-being.

Based on the decision in Welsh, the Supreme Court also granted certiorari and vacated the judgments in Morico v. United States, Vaughn v. United States, McQueary v. United States, and Callison v. United States, remanding all four cases for further consideration in light of Welsh. The following year, in Gillette v. United States, 401 U.S. 437 (1971), the Supreme Court upheld the requirement that applicants oppose participation in all wars, rather than particular wars.

In Wisconsin v. Yoder, 406 U.S. 205 (1972), the Court distinguished religious objections to compulsory schooling from philosophical or personal objections. Justice Douglas, dissenting in part, argued that this distinction was inconsistent with Seeger and Welsh.

== Scholarly commentary ==
Scholarly analysis of the case developed quickly. Writing in the William & Mary Law Review in 1970, Peter M. Desler argued that the decision extended Seeger beyond congressional intent and left an excessively subjective and unworkable standard for determining conscientious objector status. The following year, in the Loyola of Los Angeles Law Review, Michael C. Cohen and David C. Wright welcomed the broader exemption as socially desirable but argued that the plurality distorted congressional intent to avoid the constitutional issue. They preferred Harlan's direct constitutional analysis while also questioning his remedy of extending the statute's coverage.

Andrew Koppelman interpreted Seeger and Welsh as examples of defining religion through analogy to recognized religious beliefs and practices, rather than through a single necessary characteristic such as theism, conscience, or intensity of conviction. Drawing on R. Kent Greenawalt's account of religious "family resemblance", he argued that conscience supplied the decisive analogy in these cases without necessarily defining religion in every context. He also criticized reliance on intensity of conviction alone as a basis for accommodation. Writing in the University of Chicago Law Review in 2019, Mark Storslee criticized the statutory reasoning in both Seeger and Welsh, but rejected the interpretation that the decisions established a general constitutional requirement to extend religious accommodations to equivalent secular convictions. Only Harlan, he noted, expressly adopted this approach in Welsh, while subsequent decisions permitted accommodations benefiting religion alone. Storslee instead interpreted the draft cases as addressing the unusually powerful incentive to adopt religious beliefs created by conditioning exemption from combat service on religion. Broadening the exemption removed that coercive incentive.
