= Parker v. North Carolina =

- Supreme Court of the United States

Argued November 17, 1969 Decided May 4, 1970
- Full case name: Parker v. North Carolina
- Citations: 397 U.S. 790 (more) 90 S. Ct. 1458; 25 L. Ed. 2d 785; 1970 U.S. LEXIS 47

Court membership
- Chief Justice Warren E. Burger Associate Justices Hugo Black · William O. Douglas; John M. Harlan II · William J. Brennan Jr. Potter Stewart · Byron White; Thurgood Marshall

Case opinions
- Majority: White, joined by Burger, Harlan, Stewart
- Concurrence: Black
- Dissent: Brennan, joined by Douglas, Marshall

Parker v. North Carolina, 397 U.S. 790 (1970), was a United States Supreme Court case in which the Court ruled that a plea agreement was valid even if the defendant entered into it in order to avoid the death penalty and even if his decision was based on a possibly mistaken belief on the part of the defendant and his lawyer that a confession the defendant had made would be admissible in court.
