= Lloyd Corp. v. Tanner =

- Supreme Court of the United States

Argued April 18, 1972 Decided June 22, 1972
- Full case name: Lloyd Corporation, Ltd. v. Donald Tanner, Betsy Wheeler, and Susan Roberts
- Citations: 407 U.S. 551 (more) 92 S. Ct. 2219; 33 L. Ed. 2d 131

Case history
- Prior: The United States District Court for the District of Oregon issued a permanent injunction, which the Ninth Circuit affirmed.
- Subsequent: Reversed and Remanded

Holding
- Shopping centers can forbid the dissemination of handbills unrelated to their operations despite the First Amendment.

Court membership
- Chief Justice Warren E. Burger Associate Justices William O. Douglas · William J. Brennan Jr. Potter Stewart · Byron White; Thurgood Marshall · Harry Blackmun; Lewis F. Powell Jr. · William Rehnquist

Case opinions
- Majority: Powell, joined by Burger, White, Blackmun, Rehnquist
- Dissent: Marshall, joined by Douglas, Brennan, Stewart

Laws applied
- U.S. Const., amends. I, V, XIV

Lloyd Corp. v. Tanner, 407 U.S. 551 (1972), was a United States Supreme Court ruling that the passing out of anti-war leaflets at the Lloyd Center in Portland, Oregon, was an infringement on property rights. This differed from Marsh v. Alabama (1946) and Amalgamated Food Employees Union v. Logan Valley Plaza (1968) in that Marsh had the attributes of a municipality and Logan Valley related to picketing a particular store, while the current case, the distribution of leaflets, is unrelated to any activity in the property.

== Background ==
In 1960, the Lloyd Center, a large shopping mall near downtown Portland, Oregon, owned by the private Lloyd Corporation, had been in operation for eight years when this case commenced. Throughout this period the corporation had a general prohibition on the distribution of handbills, but it was generally open to public use. The Lloyd Corporation permitted the American Legion to sell poppies for disabled veterans, and every year before Christmas it permitted bell ringers for the Salvation Army and Volunteers of America to set up kettles and solicit contributions. However, it denied access to the March of Dimes and Hadassah, a national Zionist women's service organization. Both major parties' presidential candidates were allowed to speak in the mall's auditorium. The mall's rules were enforced by twelve commissioned special police officers of the city of Portland. These guards had full jurisdiction within the mall, carried guns, and wore uniforms just like the ones worn by the Portland police.

On November 14, 1968, five young people, including the respondents in this case, distributed within the mall handbill invitations to a meeting of the "Resistance Community" to protest against the draft for the Vietnam War. The distribution was quiet and orderly, and there was no littering. A customer complained, and security guards informed the respondents that they were trespassing and would be arrested unless they stopped their distribution. The respondents left the premises as requested to avoid arrest and continued passing out handbills on the streets and sidewalks that surrounded the mall. They later brought suit in the United States District Court for the District of Oregon seeking declaratory and injunctive relief under 42 U.S.C. § 1983 and 28 U.S.C. § 2201.

== Public or private property ==
The Lloyd case resonated with the Supreme Court's 1946 Marsh v. Alabama decision, adjudicating on the public use of the private property. In that case, the court held that a company town could not exclude a Jehovah's Witness from distributing religious literature on a privately owned sidewalk. Balancing Marsh's First Amendment rights against the owner's property rights, the court, in that case, held that Marsh's rights occupied a "preferred position" and weighed heavier than the owner's rights.

In other cases, the courts held that property rights were violated and people's First Amendment rights were not protected on private property. In a similar case in New Jersey, the Supreme court has upheld freedom of speech over private property rights.

== Decision ==
The District Court found that the mall was open to the general public and equivalent to a public business district. Therefore, it held that the Lloyd Corporation's "rule prohibiting the distribution of handbills within the Mall violates ... First Amendment rights" and issued a permanent injunction restraining the corporation from interfering with these rights. The Court of Appeals held that it was bound by the lower court's factual determination as to the character of the center, and concluded that the Supreme Court precedents Marsh v. Alabama and Amalgamated Food Employees Union v. Logan Valley Plaza compelled affirmance. The Lloyd Corporation appealed the decision to the Supreme Court, which granted certiorari on the question of whether the appeals court's decision violated property rights protected by the Fifth and Fourteenth Amendments. Justice Lewis F. Powell concluded that the respondents could have distributed their handbills on "any public street, on any public sidewalk, in any public park, or in any public building." Therefore, respondents were not entitled to exercise their free-speech rights on the privately owned shopping-center property.

== Significance ==
Lloyd Corp v. Tanner led to the Pruneyard Shopping Center v. Robins (1980) case, where high school students petitioned against the U.N resolution "Zionism is Racism." The court sided with the First Amendment saying that it didn't violate the mall's rights under the U.S. Constitution. However, the court reaffirmed its decision in the previous cases of Lloyd v. Tanner and National Labor Relations Board, leaving the decision up to the state's own constitution. With Richard Nixon's appointees to Supreme Court, it became more conservative than it had been in Amalgamated Food Employees Union Local 590 v. Logan Valley Plaza, where it upheld that shopping center sidewalks were equivalent to public sidewalks, allowing union works to strike and be protected under the First Amendment. The Burger court reversed many of the liberal decisions after Lloyd Corp v. Tanner. Justice Marshall said in his dissent after the case, "Only the wealthy may find effective communication possible unless we adhere to Marsh v. Alabama." Both Justice Marshall and New Jersey Supreme Court Justice Marie L. Garibaldi noticed that the underlying truth of the matter could be undermining freedom. The New Jersey Supreme Court reaffirmed its decision that the state's constitution protected those who protested the Persian Gulf War. Writing after the case, Chief Justice Robert Wilentz wrote, "[N]o use is more closely associated with the old downtown than leafleting."

== See also ==
- Gunn v. University Committee to End the War in Viet Nam
- Mora v. McNamara
