= Daniel Seeger =

American Quaker

Daniel Andrew ("Dan") Seeger is a retired administrator of Friends' (Quaker) organizations and a writer on Friends' religion and social issues. He was earlier a defendant in a notable case on conscription of pacifists that was decided by the Supreme Court.

Seeger had come from a Roman Catholic background, been heavily influenced by Quaker ideas, and volunteered with the American Friends Service Committee (AFSC). In 1958, he was denied conscientious-objector status under the 1948 military draft law, on grounds that his religious beliefs did not constitute "belief in a Supreme Being"; he was eventually ordered to enter the armed forces, and convicted of draft refusal. In 1965, the Supreme Court ruled in United States v. Seeger that his conviction was mistaken, because Congress, in its statutory language, "did not intend" using "the usual understanding" of "Supreme Being", but rather an interpretation that extended to Seeger's "compulsion" to "goodness".

Seeger made a career in the administration of the AFSC. In the 1980s and 90s he wrote four pamphlets for publication by the Quaker Universalist Fellowship, and two by the Quaker study-center publisher Pendle Hill. He retired in September 2000 from the role of executive director of Pendle Hill.

On April 1, 2010, Seeger stepped into the role of Interim General Secretary at the AFSC, pending the conclusion of the search for a permanent General Secretary, following the resignation of Mary Ellen McNish on March 31.

== Related Links ==
https://quakervoice.org
