= In re Winship =

- Supreme Court of the United States

Argued January 20, 1970 Decided March 31, 1970
- Full case name: In the Matter of Samuel Winship, Appellant
- Citations: 397 U.S. 358 (more) 90 S. Ct. 1068; 25 L. Ed. 2d 368; 51 O.O.2d 323; 1970 U.S. LEXIS 56

Case history
- Prior: 91 N.Y.S.2d 1005 (App. Div. 1968), aff'd, 247 N.E.2d 253 (N.Y. 1969).

Holding
- The Constitution's Fourteenth Amendment Due Process Clause requires that every element of a criminal offense be proven beyond a reasonable doubt, instead of the preponderance of the evidence standard used heretofore in juvenile court.

Court membership
- Chief Justice Warren E. Burger Associate Justices Hugo Black · William O. Douglas; John M. Harlan II · William J. Brennan Jr. Potter Stewart · Byron White; Thurgood Marshall

Case opinions
- Majority: Brennan, joined by Douglas, Harlan, White, Marshall
- Concurrence: Harlan
- Dissent: Burger, joined by Stewart
- Dissent: Black

Laws applied
- U.S. Const. amend. XIV

In re Winship, 397 U.S. 358 (1970), was a United States Supreme Court decision that held that "the Due Process Clause protects the accused against conviction except upon proof beyond a reasonable doubt of every fact necessary to constitute the crime charged." It established this burden in all cases in all states (constitutional case).

In an opinion authored by Justice Brennan, the Court held that when a juvenile is charged with an act that would be a crime if committed by an adult, every element of the offense must be proved beyond reasonable doubt, not preponderance of the evidence. The case has come to stand for a broader proposition, however: in a criminal prosecution, every essential element of the offense must be proved beyond reasonable doubt. See, e.g., Apprendi v. New Jersey, 530 U.S. 466, 477 (2000); Sullivan v. Louisiana, 508 U.S. 275, 278 (1993). This case marked a rejection of the preponderance of evidence standard in any criminal cases and expanded the protections afforded by the Due Process Clause.

== See also ==
- List of United States Supreme Court cases, volume 397
