= Ordered liberty =

Freedom limited by the need for social order

Ordered liberty is a concept in political philosophy, where individual freedom is balanced with the necessity for maintaining social order.

The phrase "ordered liberty" originates, in Supreme Court jurisprudence, from an opinion by Justice Benjamin Cardozo in Palko v. Connecticut, 302 U.S. 319 (1937), wherein the Supreme Court held that the Due Process Clause protected only those rights that were "of the very essence of a scheme of ordered liberty" and that the court should therefore incorporate the Bill of Rights onto the states gradually, as justiciable violations arose, based on whether the infringed right met that test.

Utilizing a case-by-case approach known as selective incorporation, the Court upheld Palko's conviction, asserting that the appeal regarding double jeopardy was not "essential to a fundamental scheme of ordered liberty." The decision was made with an 8–1 vote, with Justice Pierce Butler serving as the sole dissenter, although he did not write a dissenting opinion.

In "Ordered Liberty: The Original Intent of the Constitution," Charles McC. Mathias Jr. examined the concept of ordered liberty and its relationship to the U.S. Constitution. He argues that the Constitution was designed to protect individual liberty within a framework of ordered liberty, which balances the need for social order with the importance of individual freedom.

Mathias contended the Constitution's original intent is a framework for ordered liberty, not a fixed set of rules. It highlights the founders' use of historical lessons and political theory, particularly the separation of powers, to create a flexible system adaptable to changing conditions. The article critiques the notion of adhering strictly to "original intent", emphasizing that the Constitution's principles should guide contemporary interpretation to ensure liberty and prevent tyranny.

Matthew Grothouse argued in his work that the Obergefell majority opinion, by upholding the right to same-sex marriage, aligns with extending substantive due process to "important conduct implicit in the concept of ordered liberty." This approach argues for a more expansive view of protected liberties, recognizing that understanding fundamental rights can evolve over time. It focuses on protecting personal choices central to individual dignity and autonomy, even if those rights lack a longstanding historical basis.

Grothouse reasoned that the Obergefell majority opinion demonstrates how courts can recognize new dimensions of freedom that are "implicit in the concept of ordered liberty" without resorting to an entirely unconstrained or subjective interpretation.

While Grothouse did not offer a concise definition of "liberty", he emphasized the ongoing debate over its meaning and scope within the context of the Due Process Clause. The author suggested that a nuanced understanding of ordered liberty allows for recognizing new rights while remaining grounded in legal principles and respecting the balance between individual freedom and societal interests.

Grothouse identifies two main arguments surrounding the interpretation of "liberty" under the Due Process Clause.

== Colonial American history ==
In Albion's Seed (1989), historian David Hackett Fischer argued that the Puritan settlers of New England in the 17th century embraced ordered liberty, in contrast with other waves of British settlers who identified with other libertarian traditions. Fischer wrote that the Puritans' ordered liberty contained four components:

- Collective liberty – also known as "publick liberty", the liberty of New England towns and communities to govern without external interference
- Individual liberties – specific exemptions from conditions of restraint, such as the liberty of local residents to fish in a town's river
- Soul liberty – also known as "Christian liberty", the freedom to live in a Godly way as prescribed by the Puritan clergy (as distinguished from religious tolerance)
- Freedom from the tyranny of circumstance – freedoms from fear and want, as reflected in Massachusetts's poor laws

Fischer further argued that the four components of Puritan ordered liberty survived into the 20th century as President Franklin D. Roosevelt's "Four Freedoms".

== Narrow interpretation ==
This view, championed by figures like Justice Antonin Scalia and reflected in the Dobbs majority opinion, argued that the Due Process Clause protects only those specific liberties that were objectively recognized and protected as of 1868 when the Fourteenth Amendment was adopted. This approach emphasizes a strict adherence to historical practices and a narrow reading of the Constitution's text. It seeks to limit judicial discretion and prevent judges from imposing their own values when interpreting the Constitution.

== Broader interpretation ==
This perspective, associated with figures like Justices Harlan and Souter, posits that the concept of "liberty" is not frozen in time but evolves alongside societal values and understandings. This approach emphasizes the importance of reasoned judgment and the application of abstract principles to contemporary issues. Proponents argue that a rigid focus on historical practices ignores the aspirational nature of constitutional principles and limits the Constitution's ability to adapt to changing social contexts.

According to Grothouse, this broader interpretation often grounds its justifications in the concept of "ordered liberty", which recognizes that individual freedom must coexist within a framework of laws that protect both autonomy and social order. This framework considers the historical development of legal principles alongside evolving societal values. Grothouse argues that the Court has a duty to protect certain fundamental rights and liberties that are essential for individuals to live meaningful lives, even if those rights are not explicitly mentioned in the Constitution.

The U.S. Supreme Court has recognized many fundamental freedoms as falling under the constitutional protection of "ordered liberty," including the freedom of association, marriage, family planning, child-rearing and education. However, the Court has also held that the Constitution protects ordered liberty and that laws made in good faith to protect public health and safety are constitutional.

== Considerations of positive and negative liberty ==
"Ordered liberty" refers to a political philosophy that balances the concepts of positive liberty and negative liberty. Negative liberty is the absence of external constraints on the individual, while positive liberty is the ability to act on one's desires and goals. Ordered liberty acknowledges the importance of negative liberty but recognizes that this liberty can only be exercised within the constraints of a well-ordered society. At the same time, it recognizes the importance of positive liberty, but places limits on it to ensure that individual actions do not harm others or the broader social order.

This concept has been discussed by many political philosophers, including Friedrich Hayek, who emphasized the importance of negative liberty in his work "The Constitution of Liberty," and Isaiah Berlin, who distinguished between positive and negative liberty in his essay "Two Concepts of Liberty."

Overall, the concept of ordered liberty attempts to strike a balance between individual freedom and social order, recognizing that both are important and necessary for a healthy and just society.

== Historical context ==
In the United States, the concept of "ordered liberty" was first introduced, in Supreme Court jurisprudence, in the majority opinion of Benjamin Cardozo in Palko v. Connecticut (1937). In his opinion, Cardozo argued that fundamental constitutional rights are not absolute and must be balanced against the societal/public welfare and the individual/personal rights provides the primary judicial recognition of ordered liberty.

Cardozo acknowledged the difficulty of achieving "proper order and coherence" and argued that some constitutionally enumerated rights are not essential to a scheme of "ordered liberty" and, therefore not incorporated in the fourteenth amendment and applied to the states. He stated that "to abolish [these rights] is not to violate a principle of justice so rooted in the traditions and conscience of our people as to be ranked fundamental."

However, Cardozo also argued that certain rights are "of the very essence of a scheme of ordered liberty". He identified "freedom of thought and speech" as an example of such a right because they constituted "the matrix, the indispensable condition, of nearly every other form of freedom."

While Justice Cardozo's use of "ordered liberty" in Palko was new to Supreme Court jurisprudence, he did not invent the phase. According to a 2023 article by Christopher R.J. Pace entitled The Disorderly Origin of "Ordered Liberty", President Hoover -- the President who nominated Justice Cardozo to the Supreme Court -- invoked the phrase in several speeches in 1928 and 1932, including his well-publicized speech, Principles and Ideals of the United States Government. Pace also notes that Secretary of State Bainbridge Colby used the phrase in a well-known speech, Liberty, that he delivered in 1920.

=== Fourteenth Amendment of the United States Constitution ===
The concept of ordered liberty was the initial standard for determining what provisions of the Bill of Rights were to be upheld by the states through the Due Process Clause of the Fourteenth Amendment. The Fourteenth Amendment encompasses all of the guarantees on fundamental fairness included in, or that arose from, the Bill of Rights rather than a small class of provisions essential to ordered liberty. According to some legal scholars, the Fourteenth Amendment of the United States Constitution covers all the protections of fundamental fairness contained in or that emerged from the Bill of Rights, rather than only a few provisions deemed crucial to "ordered liberty." This view suggests that the Fourteenth Amendment requires states to respect the specific rights spelled out in the Bill of Rights and the general principles of due process and equal protection under the law.

This interpretation of the Fourteenth Amendment is rooted in the Supreme Court's decisions over time, which have recognized that it incorporates various rights from the Bill of Rights that are fundamental to our system of justice. For example, the Court has held that the Fourteenth Amendment protects the right to freedom of speech, the right to bear arms, and the right to counsel, among other rights.

== 2022 Supreme Court decision on Roe v. Wade ==
In a 6 to 3 decision in Dobbs v. Jackson Women's Health Organization on June 24, 2022, the United States Supreme Court overturned the abortion rights established by Roe v. Wade. This decision has raised concerns among legal scholars, including Melissa Murray and Katherine Shaw, that it may narrow the Fourteenth Amendment's protections. They argue that the ruling could set a precedent endangering other civil liberties, such as the rights to interracial marriage and marriage equality for LGBTQ+ people, in future cases.

The Dobbs decision notably challenged the principle of stare decisis by overturning established precedents like Roe v. Wade and Planned Parenthood v. Casey. This has prompted debate about the implications of the ruling and the future of constitutional law in the United States. Murray, Shaw, and Greenhouse argued that disregarding stare decisis in this context impacts the concept of ordered liberty, potentially leading to uncertainty in protecting other civil liberties that have relied on similar judicial precedents.

=== 2022 Majority Supreme Court opinions: Dobbs v. Jackson Women's Health Organization ===
==== Justice Alito ====
When referring to ordered liberty with respect to the legality of abortion in the Dobbs v. Jackson Women's Health Organization ruling, Justice Samuel Alito wrote: "The Constitution makes no reference to abortion, and no such right is implicitly protected by any constitutional provision, including the one on which the defenders of Roe and Casey now chiefly rely—the Due Process Clause of the Fourteenth Amendment." Further, Alito commented, "That provision has been held to guarantee some rights that are not mentioned in the Constitution, but any such right must be 'deeply rooted in this Nation's history and tradition' and 'implicit in the concept of ordered liberty.'"

==== Justice Thomas ====
Justice Clarence Thomas suggested that the Dobbs v. Jackson Women's Health Organization ruling on Roe V. Wade was an opportunity to "correct the error" of legal gay marriage; in his written opinion, he contended that Obergefell will continue to have "ruinous consequences for religious liberty."

Thomas wrote that the Supreme Court "should reconsider all of this Court's substantive due process precedents, including Griswold, Lawrence, and Obergefell; he contends that those precedents were "demonstrably erroneous":

- Griswold v. Connecticut (1965) established that married couples have a right to purchase and use contraception without government interference in a 7–2 decision.
- Lawrence v. Texas (2003) showed that criminal penalties for sodomy or private sexual acts between consenting adults are unconstitutional. That decision came down in a 6 to 3 ruling.
- Obergefell v. Hodges (2015) ruled that the fundamental right to marry is guaranteed to same-sex couples by the Due Process Clause and the Equal Protection Clause of the Fourteenth Amendment to the United States Constitution in a 5 to 4 Supreme Court decision.

=== Additional background: Footnote 4 ===
The Court clarified in the United States v. Carolene Products Co. that in its interpretation of the Fourteenth Amendment, more judicial scrutiny might be applied to laws that inhibit rights specified in the Bill of Rights, laws that impose "restrictions upon the right to vote," or laws that express "prejudice against discrete and insular minorities."

Protection of "ordered liberty" means that some minor restrictions on various activities will be upheld because by safely establishing public order, more opportunities are provided for us to exercise our liberties freely. Specifically in this case, a section known as footnote 4, states that there is a need for special protection of "religious ... or national ... or racial minorities" and this protection may from time-to-time require additional judicial inquiry.

== See also ==
- Conservative liberalism – Political ideology representing the conservative wing of the liberal movement
- Social contract – Concept in political philosophy
- Substantive due process – Legal principle
