= Remand (court procedure) =

Case referral back from higher court

Remand is when higher courts send cases back to lower courts for further action.

For example, in U.S. law, appellate courts remand cases to district courts for actions such as a new trial. Federal appellate courts, including the Supreme Court, have the power to "remand [a] cause and ... require such further proceedings to be had as may be just under the circumstances." This includes the power to make summary "grant, vacate and remand" (GVR) orders.

Appellate courts remand cases whose outcome they are unable to finally determine. For example, cases may be remanded when the appellate court decides that the trial judge committed a procedural error, excluded admissible evidence, or ruled improperly on a motion. In common law jurisdictions, remand refers to the adjournment (continuance) of criminal proceedings, when the accused is either remanded in custody or on bail. Appellate courts are said to remit matters to lower courts for further consideration.

== Details ==
=== Remand in the United States ===
When the United States Supreme Court grants certiorari and reverses a decision of a state supreme court or a Federal appeals court, it may remand the case. Likewise, an appeals court may remand a case to a trial court. A remand may be a full remand, essentially ordering an entirely new trial; when an appellate court grants a full remand, the lower court's decision is "reversed and remanded."

Alternatively, it may be "with instructions" specifying, for example, that the lower court must use a different legal standard when considering facts already entered at trial. A partial remand occurs when an appellate court affirms a conviction while directing the lower court to revisit the sentencing phase of the trial. Finally, it may remand a case upon concluding that the lower court made a mistake and also did not adjudicate issues that must be considered.

A federal court may also remand when a civil case is filed in a state court and the defendant removes the case to the local federal district court. If the federal court decides that the case was not one in which removal was permissible, it may remand the case to state court. Here, the federal court is not an appellate court as in the case above, and the case was remanded because the removal to the federal court was improper.

In federal tribunals in the United States, it is possible for an Article III court to remand a case to an Article I court, if the case was originally decided by the Article I court and then appealed to the Article III court, or for a higher-level administrative tribunal within an executive agency to remand a case to a lower-level tribunal within the same agency.

While Article III courts are allowed to remand a case back to Article I courts, there is a recent trend towards divesting U.S. magistrate judges from the power to remand cases back to state court. The same statutory basis for divesting magistrate judges of their power to remand may logically be applied to Article I judges.

== See also ==
- Appeal
- Court
- Criminal justice
- GVR order
- Remand (detention)
