= Gunn v. University Committee to End the War in Viet Nam =

- Supreme Court of the United States

Argued January 13–14, 1969 Reargued April 29–30, 1970 Decided June 29, 1970
- Full case name: Lester Gunn, et al., Appellants v. University Committee to End the War in Viet Nam, et al.
- Citations: 399 U.S. 383 (more) 90 S. Ct. 2013; 26 L. Ed. 2d 684; 1970 U.S. LEXIS 87

Case history
- Prior: Univ. Comm. to End War in Viet Nam v. Gunn, 289 F. Supp. 469 (W.D. Tex. 1968); probable jurisdiction noted, 393 U.S. 819 (1968).

Holding
- Without an order granting an injunction or denying one, the Court had no power to review that case.

Court membership
- Chief Justice Warren E. Burger Associate Justices Hugo Black · William O. Douglas; John M. Harlan II · William J. Brennan Jr. Potter Stewart · Byron White; Thurgood Marshall · Harry Blackmun

Case opinions
- Majority: Stewart, joined by Burger, Black, Douglas, Harlan, Brennan, White, Marshall
- Concurrence: White, joined by Brennan
- Blackmun took no part in the consideration or decision of the case.

Laws applied
- 28 U.S.C. § 1253

Gunn v. University Committee to End the War in Viet Nam, 399 U.S. 383 (1970), is a United States Supreme Court case in which the Court that since the District Court has issued neither an injunction nor an order granting or denying one, Supreme Court has no jurisdiction under 28 U.S.C. § 1253, which provides for review of orders granting or denying interlocutory or permanent injunctions.

== Background ==
=== Facts ===
Demonstrators against the war in Vietnam were arrested for disturbing the peace after they appeared with antiwar placards at the edge of a crowd attending a speech by President Johnson at Fort Hood, Texas.

They were charged with disturbing the peace under Tex. Pen. Code, Art. 474.

=== Complaint ===
In an action filed nine days later against defendant county officials in the United States District Court for the Western District of Texas, they asked that a three-judge district court be convened, that enforcement of Art. 474 be enjoined, and that it be declared unconstitutional.

A three-judge District Court was convened.

=== Dismissal sought ===
A few days after plaintiffs filed their federal suit, the state charges against plaintiffs were dismissed because plaintiffs' conduct had taken place within a military enclave over which Texas lacked jurisdiction.

Defendants then sought to dismiss the federal case. Plaintiffs, conceding that there was no remaining controversy as to the prosecution of the state charges, asked that the district court grant relief against enforcement of the statute because of its unconstitutionality.

=== District Court ===
The three-judge District Court held that the disturbing-the-peace statute was unconstitutionally broad, and that the demonstrators were entitled to a declaratory judgment to that effect and to injunctive relief against the enforcement of the statute, but that the mandate would be stayed pending the next session of the Texas Legislature, so that the legislature, if it so desired, could enact such disturbing-the- peace statute as would meet constitutional requirements. After the Texas Legislature at its next session took no action with respect to the statute, the District Court entered no further order of any kind.

The three-judge court issued a per curiam opinion, concluding that Art. 474 "is . . . unconstitutionally broad. The Plaintiffs herein are entitled to their declaratory judgment to that effect, and to injunctive relief against the enforcement of Article 474 as now worded . . . . However, . . . the mandate shall be stayed and this Court shall retain jurisdiction of the cause pending the next session . . . of the Texas legislature . . . ."

=== Appeal and arguments ===
The county officials took a direct appeal to the United States Supreme Court under 28 U.S.C. § 1253, which provides for an appeal to the Supreme Court from a three- judge Federal District Court order "granting or denying" an injunction.

== Opinion of the Court ==
The Court stated that § 1253 provided for a direct appeal to it only from an order granting or denying an injunction. Here, no injunction had ever been entered, as the parties themselves recognized. All the district court had done was to write a rather discursive per curiam opinion. Thus, the Court had no jurisdiction over the appeal.

The United States Supreme Court dismissed the appeal for want of jurisdiction. Justice Potter Stewart, writing for a unanimous court, held that since the District Court had issued neither an injunction nor an order granting or denying one, the Supreme Court had no power under 1253 either to remand to the District Court or to deal with the merits of the case in any way at all.

Justice Byron White, joined by Justice William J. Brennan Jr., joined in the opinion of the court, but expressed the view that the District Court's opinion should have been viewed as having the operative effect of a declaratory judgment invalidating the Texas disturbing-the-peace statute, so that the state was entitled to have that phase of the case reviewed by the United States Court of Appeals.

== Aftermath ==
Companion cases, Dial v. Fontaine, and Hutcherson v. Lehtin were each dismissed in a one-line per curiam opinions citing Gunn.

== See also ==
- Mora v. McNamara
- Lloyd Corp. v. Tanner
