= Palko v. Connecticut =

- Supreme Court of the United States

Argued November 12, 1937 Decided December 6, 1937
- Full case name: Palko v. State of Connecticut
- Citations: 302 U.S. 319 (more) 58 S. Ct. 149; 82 L. Ed. 288; 1937 U.S. LEXIS 549

Case history
- Prior: State v. Palko, 122 Conn. 529, 191 A. 320 (1937); probable jurisdiction noted, 58 S. Ct. 20 (1937).

Holding
- The Fifth Amendment right to protection against double jeopardy is not a fundamental right incorporated by the Fourteenth Amendment to the individual states.

Court membership
- Chief Justice Charles E. Hughes Associate Justices James C. McReynolds · Louis Brandeis; George Sutherland · Pierce Butler; Harlan F. Stone · Owen Roberts; Benjamin N. Cardozo · Hugo Black

Case opinions
- Majority: Cardozo, joined by McReynolds, Brandeis, Sutherland, Stone, Roberts, Black
- Dissent: Butler

Laws applied
- U.S. Const. amend. V, U.S. Const. amend. XIV
- Overruled by
- Benton v. Maryland, 395 U.S. 784 (1969)

Palko v. Connecticut, 302 U.S. 319 (1937), was a United States Supreme Court case concerning the incorporation of the Fifth Amendment protection against double jeopardy.

Justice Benjamin Cardozo, writing for the majority, explained that some Constitutional protections that would apply against the federal government would not be incorporated to apply against the states unless the guarantee was "implicit in the concept of ordered liberty". Incorporation of the Bill of Rights was selective, not a general rule, and in this case the Court declined to incorporate the protection from double jeopardy against the states, even though the protection would most certainly have been upheld against the federal government.

The Court reversed itself in 1969 and overruled Palko by incorporating the protection against double jeopardy in Benton v. Maryland.

== Background ==
In 1935, Frank Palko, a Connecticut resident, broke into a local music store and stole a phonograph, fled on foot, and, when cornered by law enforcement, shot and killed two police officers and made his escape. He was captured a month later.

Palko had been charged with first-degree murder but was instead convicted of the lesser offense of second-degree murder and was given a sentence of life imprisonment. Prosecutors appealed per Connecticut law and won a new trial in which Palko was found guilty of first-degree murder and sentenced to death. Palko then appealed, arguing that the Fifth Amendment protection against double jeopardy applied to state governments through the Due Process Clause of the Fourteenth Amendment. The Court had previously held, in the Slaughterhouse cases, that the protections of the Bill of Rights should not be applied to the states under the Privileges or Immunities clause, but Palko argued that since the infringed right fell under a due process protection, Connecticut still acted in violation of the Fourteenth Amendment.

== Decision ==
In an opinion by Justice Benjamin Cardozo, the Court held that the Due Process Clause protected only those rights that were "of the very essence of a scheme of ordered liberty" and that the court should therefore incorporate the Bill of Rights onto the states gradually, as justiciable violations arose, based on whether the infringed right met that test.

Applying the subjective case-by-case approach (known as selective incorporation), the Court upheld Palko's conviction on the basis that the double jeopardy appeal was not "essential to a fundamental scheme of ordered liberty." The case was decided by an 8–1 vote. Justice Pierce Butler was the lone dissenter, but he did not author a dissenting opinion.

Palko was executed in Connecticut's electric chair on April 12, 1938.

== Later developments ==
The Court eventually reversed course and overruled Palko by incorporating the protection against double jeopardy with its 1969 ruling in Benton v. Maryland.

== See also ==
- List of United States Supreme Court cases, volume 302
