= List of United States Supreme Court cases, volume 397 =

This is a list of all the United States Supreme Court cases from volume 397 of the United States Reports:

| Case name | Citation | Date decided |
|---|---|---|
| United States v. Kordel | 397 U.S. 1 | 1970 |
| United States v. Reynolds (1970) | 397 U.S. 14 | 1970 |
| Czosek v. O'Mara | 397 U.S. 25 | 1970 |
| Jones v. Board of Ed. | 397 U.S. 31 | 1970 |
| Contractors Cargo Co. v. United States | 397 U.S. 39 | 1970 |
| Turner v. Clay | 397 U.S. 39 | 1970 |
| Pre-Fab Transit Co. v. United States | 397 U.S. 40 | 1970 |
| Locke v. California | 397 U.S. 40 | 1970 |
| Chemical Leaman Tank Lines, Inc. v. United States | 397 U.S. 41 | 1970 |
| Keller v. Department of Alcoholic Beverage Control | 397 U.S. 41 | 1970 |
| Associated Truck Lines, Inc. v. United States | 397 U.S. 42 | 1970 |
| Kelly v. Mountain States Tel. & Tel. Co. | 397 U.S. 42 | 1970 |
| United States v. Wiernick | 397 U.S. 43 | 1970 |
| Sussman v. United States | 397 U.S. 43 | 1970 |
| Burruss v. Wilkerson | 397 U.S. 44 | 1970 |
| United States v. Cotton | 397 U.S. 45 | 1970 |
| United States v. Santos | 397 U.S. 46 | 1970 |
| Kolden v. Selective Serv. Local Bd. | 397 U.S. 47 | 1970 |
| Troutman v. United States | 397 U.S. 48 | 1970 |
| Wyman v. Bowens | 397 U.S. 49 | 1970 |
| Hadley v. Junior Coll. Dist. | 397 U.S. 50 | 1970 |
| Colonnade Catering Corp. v. United States | 397 U.S. 72 | 1970 |
| Reetz v. Bozanich | 397 U.S. 82 | 1970 |
| Arkansas v. Tennessee | 397 U.S. 88 | 1970 |
| Hall v. Baum | 397 U.S. 93 | 1970 |
| United States v. Gifford-Hill-American, Inc. | 397 U.S. 93 | 1970 |
| Shaffer v. Bridges | 397 U.S. 94 | 1970 |
| Matthews v. Little | 397 U.S. 94 | 1970 |
| Lujan v. California | 397 U.S. 95 | 1970 |
| Durham v. Independence Homes, Inc. | 397 U.S. 95 | 1970 |
| Parker v. United States | 397 U.S. 96 | 1970 |
| Young v. United States | 397 U.S. 97 | 1970 |
| N.Y. Feed Co. v. Leary | 397 U.S. 98 | 1970 |
| H.K. Porter Co. v. NLRB | 397 U.S. 99 | 1970 |
| Toussie v. United States | 397 U.S. 112 | 1970 |
| Pike v. Bruce Church, Inc. | 397 U.S. 137 | 1970 |
| Gilhool v. Philadelphia Cnty. Bd. of Elections | 397 U.S. 147 | 1970 |
| Kozerowitz v. Stack | 397 U.S. 147 | 1970 |
| Liakind v. Attorney General | 397 U.S. 148 | 1970 |
| Maddox v. Fortson | 397 U.S. 149 | 1970 |
| Association of Data Processing Service Organizations, Inc. v. Camp | 397 U.S. 150 | 1970 |
| Barlow v. Collins | 397 U.S. 159 | 1970 |
| United States v. W.M. Webb, Inc. | 397 U.S. 179 | 1970 |
| Longshoremen v. Ariadne Shipping Co. | 397 U.S. 195 | 1970 |
| United States v. Seckinger | 397 U.S. 203 | 1970 |
| Taggart v. Weinacker's, Inc. | 397 U.S. 223 | 1970 |
| Northcross v. Board of Ed. | 397 U.S. 232 | 1970 |
| Cole v. Richardson | 397 U.S. 238 | 1970 |
| Martin-Trigona v. State Bd. of Law Examiners | 397 U.S. 244 | 1970 |
| United States v. Ogle | 397 U.S. 244 | 1970 |
| Hamilton v. McKeithen | 397 U.S. 245 | 1970 |
| Tryon v. Iowa | 397 U.S. 245 | 1970 |
| Bratcher v. Laird | 397 U.S. 246 | 1970 |
| Northern Freight Lines, Inc. v. United States | 397 U.S. 247 | 1970 |
| City of New York v. United States | 397 U.S. 248 | 1970 |
| United States v. Van Leeuwen | 397 U.S. 249 | 1970 |
| Goldberg v. Kelly | 397 U.S. 254 | 1970 |
| Wheeler v. Montgomery | 397 U.S. 280 | 1970 |
| United States v. Estate of Donnelly | 397 U.S. 286 | 1970 |
| United States v. Davis (1970) | 397 U.S. 301 | 1970 |
| Arnold Tours, Inc. v. Camp | 397 U.S. 315 | 1970 |
| Hogan v. James | 397 U.S. 315 | 1970 |
| Makah Tribe v. Washington | 397 U.S. 316 | 1970 |
| Marks v. Chief of Police | 397 U.S. 316 | 1970 |
| Friedman v. New York | 397 U.S. 317 | 1970 |
| Ohlson v. Phillips | 397 U.S. 317 | 1970 |
| Ginger v. Kelley | 397 U.S. 318 | 1970 |
| Nieder v. Fullerton | 397 U.S. 318 | 1970 |
| Cain v. Kentucky | 397 U.S. 319 | 1970 |
| Sanchez v. United States | 397 U.S. 320 | 1970 |
| Capital Southwest Corp. v. Calvert | 397 U.S. 321 | 1970 |
| United States v. Key | 397 U.S. 322 | 1970 |
| Craycroft v. Ferrall | 397 U.S. 335 | 1970 |
| Johnston v. Hawaii | 397 U.S. 336 | 1970 |
| Illinois v. Allen | 397 U.S. 337 | 1970 |
| In re Winship | 397 U.S. 358 | 1970 |
| Waller v. Florida | 397 U.S. 387 | 1970 |
| Rosado v. Wyman | 397 U.S. 397 | 1970 |
| Ashe v. Swenson | 397 U.S. 436 | 1970 |
| Dandridge v. Williams | 397 U.S. 471 | 1970 |
| O'Hair v. Paine | 397 U.S. 531 | 1970 |
| American Farm Lines v. Black Ball Freight Service | 397 U.S. 532 | 1970 |
| Lewis v. Martin | 397 U.S. 552 | 1970 |
| Bachellar v. Maryland | 397 U.S. 564 | 1970 |
| Woodward v. Commissioner | 397 U.S. 572 | 1970 |
| United States v. Hilton Hotels Corp. | 397 U.S. 580 | 1970 |
| Standard Industries, Inc. v. Tigrett Industries, Inc. | 397 U.S. 586 | 1970 |
| Snyder v. Ware | 397 U.S. 589 | 1970 |
| Jackson v. Department of Pub. Welfare | 397 U.S. 589 | 1970 |
| Giagnocavo v. Bucks County | 397 U.S. 590 | 1970 |
| Spartan's Industries, Inc. v. Texas | 397 U.S. 590 | 1970 |
| Sundaco, Inc. v. Texas | 397 U.S. 591 | 1970 |
| Eugene Sand & Gravel, Inc. v. Lowe | 397 U.S. 591 | 1970 |
| Gable v. Jenkins | 397 U.S. 592 | 1970 |
| Hackney v. Machado | 397 U.S. 593 | 1970 |
| United States v. Simon | 397 U.S. 594 | 1970 |
| Montgomery v. Kaiser | 397 U.S. 595 | 1970 |
| Santana v. Texas | 397 U.S. 596 | 1970 |
| Richard S. v. City of New York | 397 U.S. 597 | 1970 |
| Tooahnippah v. Hickel | 397 U.S. 598 | 1970 |
| Choctaw Nation v. Oklahoma | 397 U.S. 620 | 1970 |
| Sears, Roebuck & Co. v. Carpet Layers | 397 U.S. 655 | 1970 |
| Hester v. Illinois | 397 U.S. 660 | 1970 |
| First Nat'l Bank v. Commissioner of Revenue | 397 U.S. 661 | 1970 |
| Garden State Transit Co. v. United States | 397 U.S. 661 | 1970 |
| United States v. Rowell | 397 U.S. 662 | 1970 |
| Lampton v. Bonin | 397 U.S. 663 | 1970 |
| Walz v. Tax Comm'n | 397 U.S. 664 | 1970 |
| Rowan v. Post Office Dept. | 397 U.S. 728 | 1970 |
| Brady v. United States | 397 U.S. 742 | 1970 |
| McMann v. Richardson | 397 U.S. 759 | 1970 |
| Parker v. North Carolina | 397 U.S. 790 | 1970 |
| In re Spencer | 397 U.S. 817 | 1970 |
| Bell Lines, Inc. v. United States | 397 U.S. 818 | 1970 |
| Tex Tan Welhausen Co. v. NLRB | 397 U.S. 819 | 1970 |
| Rockefeller v. Catholic Medical Center | 397 U.S. 820 | 1970 |
| Jefferson v. Hackney | 397 U.S. 821 | 1970 |
