= Elizabeth G. Watson =

American Quaker minister, curator and theologian (1914–2006)

- Born: January 7, 1914; Cedar Rapids, Iowa
- Died: February 24, 2006 (aged 92); Edina, Minnesota
- Education: Miami University, Chicago Theological Seminary, University of Chicago Divinity School
- Occupations: Theologian, curator
- Organization: Society of Friends
- Spouse: George H. Watson (married 1937)

Elizabeth Grill Watson (January 7, 1914 – February 24, 2006) was an American Quaker minister, curator, and feminist theologian.

== Personal life ==
Elizabeth Grill Watson was born in Cedar Rapids, Iowa, on January 7, 1914. Watson grew up in Lakewood, Ohio. Women were not permitted to be ministers at her childhood Methodist church. However, she wanted to become a minister regardless. She graduated from Miami University in Ohio in 1936 with a Bachelor of Arts in Greek and literature. She then studied at the Chicago Theological Seminary and the University of Chicago Divinity School. There she met George H. Watson, whom she married in 1937. While the couple were attending a graduate school in Chicago, they joined the Society of Friends in 1938.

The Watson family lived at the Heller House in Chicago for 24 years. While living there, George worked as first chair of the political science department at Roosevelt University and Elizabeth worked at the local American Friends Service Committee.

The couple raised four children and four foster children. After the Watsons' oldest child, Sara, died in a car accident in 1964, Elizabeth wrote Guests of My Life due to the event. The book was developed into a play. In the 1980s, Elizabeth and George retired to a Quaker planned community in Massachusetts. From 1991 onward, they lived in Minneapolis. Elizabeth G. Watson died on February 24, 2006, in Edina, Minnesota.

== Work ==
Elizabeth G. Watson's theological writing focused on multiple subjects, including women in the Bible, liberation theology and feminist theology. Watson was particularly influential among liberal Quakers for her feminist theological work. Watson was more generally known as an activist for social justice, including for racial equality. The Watsons' Chicago home was the first mailing address and meeting place used by CORE, an African-American civil rights organization.

She wrote about holistic philosophy. In addition to the Quaker concept of an inward light, Watson spoke of an inward darkness she described as "not ... desolation or evil, but a quiet waiting and creativity."

After moving to Long Island, New York, Watson worked as a curator for the Walt Whitman Birthplace State Historic Site in the 1970s. Watson delivered lectures at Friends General Conference meetings for various topics. She became a representative for the Friends World Committee. She became involved with colleges associated with the Quakers, and was a Friend-in-Residence at the Earlham School of Religion. George and Elizabeth Watson were both Fellows at the Woodbrooke Quaker Study Centre and Friends-in-Residence at the Pendle Hill Quaker Center for Study and Contemplation.

She advocated for acceptance of gay people, characterizing condemnation of gay and lesbian people as archaic and ignorant of continuous revelation. In 1977, she delivered a speech to the Friends Committee for Gay Concerns (later known as the FLGBTQC) entitled Each of Us Inevitable, in which Watson stated, "As Friends, we are called to combat oppression wherever it occurs. We are called to help empower the poor, the blacks, the Native and Hispanic Americans, women, gays, and anyone else who may be victims of disaster, injustice, indignity, discrimination, or any other form of oppression. I have constantly written and spoken about this for many years, and will not repeat it here."

Some of Watson's work focused on environmental theology. By the 1990s, one concern of hers was that environmental destruction was a greater threat to the world than nuclear war.

== Bibliography ==
- Guests of My Life. Burnsville, North Carolina: Celo Press, 1979.
- Sexuality, a Part of Wholeness. Family Relations Committee, Philadelphia Yearly Meeting, 1982.
- Daughters of Zion: Stories of Old Testament Women. Richmond, Indiana: Friends United Press, 1982.
- Healing Ourselves and Our Earth. Friends Committee on Unity with Nature, 1991.
- Journey to Universalism. Landenberg, Pennsylvania: Quaker Universalist Fellowship, 1991.
- Wisdom's Daughters: Stories of Women around Jesus. Cleveland, Ohio: Pilgrim Press, 1997.

== See also ==
- Margaret Fell
- Rebecca Buffum Spring
- Walt Whitman
