= Benton v. Maryland =

- Supreme Court of the United States

Argued December 12, 1968 Reargued March 24, 1969 Decided June 23, 1969
- Full case name: Benton v. Maryland
- Citations: 395 U.S. 784 (more) 89 S. Ct. 2056; 23 L. Ed. 2d 707

Case history
- Prior: 1 Md. App. 647, 232 A.2d 541, vacated and remanded

Holding
- The protections against double jeopardy in the Fifth Amendment are incorporated against the states through the Due Process Clause of the Fourteenth Amendment.

Court membership
- Chief Justice Earl Warren Associate Justices Hugo Black · William O. Douglas; John M. Harlan II · William J. Brennan Jr. Potter Stewart · Byron White; Thurgood Marshall

Case opinions
- Majority: Marshall, joined by Warren, Black, Douglas, Brennan
- Concurrence: White
- Dissent: Harlan, joined by Stewart

Laws applied
- U.S. Const. amend. V and XIV
- This case overturned a previous ruling or rulings
- Palko v. Connecticut (1937)

Benton v. Maryland, 395 U.S. 784 (1969), is a Supreme Court of the United States decision concerning double jeopardy. Benton ruled that the Double Jeopardy Clause of the Fifth Amendment applies to the states. In doing so, Benton expressly overruled Palko v. Connecticut.

== Background ==
John Dalmer Benton was tried on charges of larceny and burglary. He was acquitted of larceny but convicted of burglary and was sentenced to 10 years in prison.

Shortly after Benton's conviction, the Maryland Court of Appeals had ruled in Schowgurow v. State that the portion of the Maryland Constitution that required all jurors to swear to their belief in the existence of God was itself unconstitutional. Since the jurors in Benton's case had been selected under the unconstitutional provision, he was given the option of demanding a new trial. Benton chose to undergo a new trial, but at the second trial, the state again charged Benton with larceny even though he had been acquitted of larceny in the first trial. The second trial concluded with Benton being found guilty of both burglary and larceny.

== Case history ==
The case was argued December 12, 1968, reargued March 24, 1969, and decided June 23, 1969. It was reargued because the original argument for which the case was granted certiorari was limited to consideration of two issues: "(1) Is the double jeopardy clause of the Fifth Amendment applicable to the States through the Fourteenth Amendment? and (2) If so, was the petitioner 'twice put in jeopardy' in this case?" At the second trial Benton's sentence of 15 years on the burglary count and five years for the larceny was to run concurrently, and after oral argument, as Justice Marshall wrote in his opinion of the court, "it became clear that the existence of a concurrent sentence on the burglary count might prevent the Court from reaching the double jeopardy issue, at least if we found that any error affected only petitioner's larceny conviction. The case was scheduled for reargument, 393 U. S. 994 (1968), limited to the following additional question not included in the original writ: "Does the 'concurrent sentence doctrine,' enunciated in Hirabayashi v. United States, 320 U. S. 81, 105, and subsequent cases, have continuing validity in light of such decisions as Ginsberg v. New York, 390 U.S. 629, 633, n. 2, Peyton v. Rowe, 391 U.S. 54, Carafas v. LaVallee, 391 U.S. 234, 237-238, and Sibron v. New York, 392 U.S. 40, 50-58?"

== Decision ==
The Supreme Court ruled that the second trial constituted double jeopardy. There was no protection against double jeopardy in Maryland from its state constitution, but the court ruled that the Due Process Clause of the Fourteenth Amendment incorporated the Double Jeopardy Clause of the Fifth Amendment and so made it enforceable against the states. As a result, the Court overturned the larceny conviction. Justice Thurgood Marshall, writing for the majority, wrote:

It is clear that petitioner's larceny conviction cannot stand once federal double jeopardy standards are applied. Petitioner was acquitted of larceny in his first trial. Because he decided to appeal his burglary conviction, he is forced to suffer retrial on the larceny count as well. As this Court held in Green v. United States ... 'conditioning an appeal of one offense on a coerced surrender of a valid plea of former jeopardy on another offense exacts a forfeiture in plain conflict with the constitutional bar against double jeopardy.'

== See also ==
- List of United States Supreme Court cases, volume 395
- Incorporation of the Bill of Rights
