= Gutknecht v. United States =

- Supreme Court of the United States

Argued November 20, 1969 Decided January 19, 1970
- Full case name: David Earl Gutknecht v. United States
- Citations: 396 U.S. 295 (more) 90 S. Ct. 506; 24 L. Ed. 2d 532; 1970 U.S. LEXIS 52

Case history
- Prior: United States v. Gutknecht, 406 F.2d 494 (8th Cir. 1969)

Holding
- The Military Selective Service Act did not authorize the Selective Service System to accelerate the induction of registrants declared "delinquent"; the delinquency regulations exceeded the authority delegated by Congress.

Court membership
- Chief Justice Warren E. Burger Associate Justices Hugo Black · William O. Douglas; John M. Harlan II · William J. Brennan Jr. Potter Stewart · Byron White; Thurgood Marshall

Case opinions
- Majority: Douglas, joined by Black, Brennan, Marshall
- Concurrence: Harlan, joined by White
- Concurrence: Stewart

Laws applied
- Military Selective Service Act of 1967

Gutknecht v. United States, 396 U.S. 295 (1970), was a case decided by the Supreme Court of the United States holding that the United States Selective Service System lacked statutory authority to punitively accelerate the induction of registrants declared "delinquent" for violating Selective Service regulations. The Court reversed the conviction of an anti-war protester whose induction had been accelerated after he left his Selective Service registration documents on the steps of a federal building in Minneapolis as an act of protest.

== Facts ==
David Earl Gutknecht, as an act of protest against the Vietnam War, left his Selective Service registration certificate and notice of classification on the steps of the Federal Building in Minneapolis, along with a statement explaining his opposition to the war. His local Selective Service board declared him delinquent for failing to possess the documents, and accelerated his induction into military service, which was a widespread practice at that time. Gutknecht refused to participate in the processing procedure at his induction, and was thereafter charged with and convicted of willfully and knowingly failing to perform a duty required under the Military Selective Service Act. He was sentenced to four years in prison, and his conviction was affirmed on appeal by the United States Court of Appeals for the Eighth Circuit.

== Opinion of the Court ==
The Supreme Court, in an opinion by Justice William O. Douglas, reversed. The Court held that nothing in the applicable legislation indicated that Congress had intended to authorize the Selective Service System to accelerate a registrant's induction for punitive purposes after declaring the registrant delinquent. The Court further observed that the regulations granting Selective Service boards authority to declare a registrant delinquent contained no statutory standards or guidelines by which such an exercise of that power would be governed.

Concurring opinions were filed by Justice Potter Stewart, and by Justice John Marshall Harlan II, joined by Justice Byron White, with Harlan's concurrence concluding that Gutknecht's conviction could not stand because the Selective Service board failed to follow regulations affording procedural rights to the inductee.

== Aftermath ==
This decision led to the swift disposition of several similar cases pending before the Supreme Court and the lower courts. In a per curiam opinion combining Peet v. United States and Guerrieri v. United States, the Supreme Court vacated the respective sentences and remanded the cases back to their respective district courts pursuant to Gutknecht.
