= United States v. Seeger =

- Supreme Court of the United States

Argued November 16–17, 1964 Decided March 8, 1965
- Full case name: United States v. Daniel Andrew Seeger; United States v. Arno Sascha Jakobson; Forest Britt Peter v. United States
- Citations: 380 U.S. 163 (more) 85 S. Ct. 850; 13 L. Ed. 2d 733; 1965 U.S. LEXIS 1666
- Argument: Oral argument

Case history
- Prior: United States v. Seeger, 216 F. Supp. 516 (S.D.N.Y. 1963); reversed, 326 F.2d 846 (2d Cir. 1964); cert. granted, 377 U.S. 922 (1964).; United States v. Jakobson, 325 F.2d 409 (2d Cir. 1963); cert. granted, 377 U.S. 922 (1964).; Peter v. United States, 324 F.2d 173 (9th Cir. 1963); cert. granted, 377 U.S. 922 (1964).

Court membership
- Chief Justice Earl Warren Associate Justices Hugo Black · William O. Douglas; Tom C. Clark · John M. Harlan II; William J. Brennan Jr. · Potter Stewart; Byron White · Arthur Goldberg

Case opinions
- Majority: Clark, joined by Warren, Black, Harlan, Brennan, Stewart, White, Goldberg
- Concurrence: Douglas

United States v. Seeger, 380 U.S. 163 (1965), was a case in which the United States Supreme Court ruled that the exemption from the military draft for conscientious objectors could be reserved not only for those professing conformity with the moral directives of a supreme being but also for those whose views on war derived from a "sincere and meaningful belief which occupies in the life of its possessor a place parallel to that filled by the God of those" who had routinely gotten the exemption.

The Court reasoned that "both morals and sound policy require that the state should not violate the conscience of the individual" and that "liberty of conscience has a moral and social value which makes it worthy of preservation at the hands of the state." Additionally, that if this principle is violated to preserve the "life" of the state that it puts into question whether the state will lose its "life" as a result.

The case resolved, on diverse but related grounds, three cases, each involving conviction for failure to accept induction into the armed forces on the part of someone who sought conscientious-objector status without "belong[ing] to an orthodox religious sect". The accused, whose cases were otherwise unrelated, were Arno Sascha Jakobson, Forest Britt Peter, and Daniel Andrew Seeger; it was Seeger's case that gave its name to the multi-case decision. Archibald Cox, then Solicitor General, argued for the United States in every case.

== See also ==
- List of United States Supreme Court cases, volume 380
- Welsh v. United States, 398 U.S. 333.
