= Quaker Universalist Fellowship =

Religious organization

The Quaker Universalist Fellowship is a religious organization mainly serving individuals with an ongoing association with the Religious Society of Friends (Quakers), a universalist understanding of Quaker teachings and traditions, and a commitment to religious pluralism. It has published books and periodicals from Landenberg, Pennsylvania, since the 1980s.

It describes itself as "an informal gathering of persons who cherish the spirit of universality that has always been intrinsic to the Quaker faith". It states that its mission is "to foster the understanding that within everyone is a directly accessible spiritual light that can lead people to equality, simplicity, justice, compassion and peace".

Somewhat different from the way the term Universalism is typically understood in Christian theology, Quaker universalism focuses on the "belief that there is a spirit of universal love in every person, and that a compassion-centered life is therefore available to people of all faiths and backgrounds."

== Publications ==
- Margery Post Abbott, Lanny Jay, W. Norman Cooper, Waiting and resting in the true silence
- David Boulton, Militant seedbeds of early Quakerism: two essays
- Samuel D. Caldwell, That blessed principle: reflections on the uniqueness of Quaker universalism, 1988
- Avery Dulles, Revelation and the religions
- Rhoda R. Gilman, The universality of unknowing: Luther Askeland and the wordless way, 2007
- Douglas Gwyn, The Quaker dynamic: personal faith and corporate vision
- Gene Knudsen-Hoffman, Kingdon W. Swayne, Spirit and trauma: a universalist world view as an instrument of healing
- Margery Larrabee, There is a hunger: mutual spiritual friendship, 1994
- Carol P. MacCormack, Jack Mongar, Hildegard of Bingen, a 12th century holistic world view
- Anthony G Manousos, Islam from a Quaker perspective, 2002
- A. Ernest Morgan, Should Quakers receive the Good Samaritan into their membership?, 1998
- John Nicholson (Quaker writer), The place of prayer is a precious habitation, 1994
- David Rush, They too are Quakers: a survey of 199 nontheist Friends
- Daniel A. Seeger,
  - Quaker universalists: their ministry among Friends and in the world, 1989
  - The boundaries of our faith: a reflection on the practice of goddess spirituality in New York Yearly Meeting, from the perspective of a Universalist Friend, 1991
  - I have called you friends (John 15:15), 1997
  - The mystical path: pilgrimage to the one who is always here, 2004
- Michael Anthony Sells, The generous Qurʼan: ten selected suras
- Mulford Quickert Sibley and Rhoda Gilman, ** Authority and mysticism in Quaker and Buddhist thought: essays
  - In praise of Gandhi: technology and the ordering of human relations, 2005
- Kingdon W Swayne, Universalism and me
- Elizabeth G. Watson, Journey to universalism
- Patricia A. Williams,
  - Hazardous engagement: God makes a Friend, 2006
  - Universalism and religions, 2007
