= List of United States Supreme Court cases, volume 398 =

This is a list of all the United States Supreme Court cases from volume 398 of the United States Reports:

Case name	Citation	Date decided
Nash v. United States	398 U.S. 1	1970
Greenbelt Cooperative Pub'g Ass'n, Inc. v. Bresler	398 U.S. 6	1970
NLRB v. Raytheon Co.	398 U.S. 25	1970
Dickey v. Florida	398 U.S. 30	1970
Schacht v. United States	398 U.S. 58	1970
Monks v. New Jersey	398 U.S. 71	1970
Daniel v. Goliday	398 U.S. 73	1970
Chandler v. Judicial Council	398 U.S. 74	1970
Adickes v. S.H. Kress Co.	398 U.S. 144	1970
Boys Markets, Inc. v. Retail Clerks	398 U.S. 235	1970
Maxwell v. Bishop	398 U.S. 262	1970
United States v. Armour & Co.	398 U.S. 268	1970
Wyman v. Rothstein	398 U.S. 275	1970
Bloss v. Dykema	398 U.S. 278	1970
Follette v. Comacho	398 U.S. 279	1970
Higgins v. United States	398 U.S. 279	1970
Leitchfield Mfg. Co. v. United States	398 U.S. 280	1970
Atl. Coast Line R.R. Co. v. Locomotive Engineers	398 U.S. 281	1970
Hellenic Lines Ltd. v. Rhoditis	398 U.S. 306	1970
Moon v. Maryland	398 U.S. 319	1970
Dept. of Social Servs. v. Dimery	398 U.S. 322	1970
Price v. Georgia	398 U.S. 323	1970
Welsh v. United States	398 U.S. 333	1970
Moragne v. States Marine Lines, Inc.	398 U.S. 375	1970
Mulloy v. United States	398 U.S. 410	1970
Evans v. Cornman	398 U.S. 419	1970
Mitchell v. Donovan	398 U.S. 427	1970
Walker v. Ohio	398 U.S. 434	1970
Summary reversal with a citation to Redrup v. New York. Burger and Harlan dissent. Marshall and Blackmun took no part.
Bassett v. Smith	398 U.S. 435	1970
Grant, vacate, remand for reconsideration with an order to provide the indigent habeas petitioner with a copy of the trial transcript.
General Electric v. Int'l Union of Elec. Radio & Mach. Workers	398 U.S. 436	1970
Grant, vacate, remand for reconsideration in light of Boys Markets v. Retail Clerks Union. Black and Douglass dissent. Marshall took no part.
