= List of United States Supreme Court cases, volume 396 =

This is a list of all the United States Supreme Court cases from volume 396 of the United States Reports:

Case name	Citation	Date decided
Ristuccia v. Adams	396 U.S. 1	1969
Hagan v. Reagan	396 U.S. 1	1969
Spalding Laundry & Dry Cleaning Co. v. Dept. of Revenue	396 U.S. 2	1969
Duffy Storage & Moving Co. v. City of Denver	396 U.S. 2	1969
Getting Equipment Corp. v. Bd. of Zoning Appeals	396 U.S. 3	1969
Furman v. City of New York	396 U.S. 3	1969
Imperial Refineries v. City of Rochester	396 U.S. 4	1969
Wheeler v. Vermont	396 U.S. 4	1969
Jordan v. Arizona ex rel. Nelson	396 U.S. 5	1969
Shapiro v. Solman	396 U.S. 5	1969
Bradesku v. Bradesku	396 U.S. 6	1969
Maine v. Shone	396 U.S. 6	1969
Interco Inc. v. Rhoden	396 U.S. 7	1969
Kellar v. Neal	396 U.S. 7	1969
Hiyane v. House of Vision, Inc.	396 U.S. 8	1969
Shikara v. Md. Cas. Co.	396 U.S. 8	1969
Bernard v. NYC Employees' Retirement System	396 U.S. 9	1969
Sellars v. United States	396 U.S. 9	1969
Whitley v. New York	396 U.S. 10	1969
Stoeckle v. Wisconsin	396 U.S. 10	1969
Puryear v. Hogan	396 U.S. 11	1969
Beacham v. Braterman	396 U.S. 12	1969
Whiddon v. United States	396 U.S. 12	1969
Simpson v. Union Oil Co.	396 U.S. 13	1969
Washum v. United States	396 U.S. 18	1969
Cox v. Tennessee	396 U.S. 18	1969
Alexander v. Holmes County Board of Education	396 U.S. 19	1969
Johnson v. State Bar of Cal.	396 U.S. 22	1969
Transp. Unlimited v. United States	396 U.S. 22	1969
NLRB v. Clark's Gamble Corp.	396 U.S. 23	1969
Clinton v. California	396 U.S. 23	1969
Jolly v. Morgan Cnty. Junior Coll. Dist.	396 U.S. 24	1969
Krafft v. New York	396 U.S. 24	1969
Md. Nat. Ins. Co. v. Dist. Ct.	396 U.S. 25	1969
Stein v. Illinois	396 U.S. 25	1969
King v. Greenblatt	396 U.S. 26	1969
Zwicker v. Wisconsin	396 U.S. 26	1969
Bost. & Me. R.R. Co. v. United States	396 U.S. 27	1969
DeBacker v. Brainard	396 U.S. 28	1969
Lawrence v. City of Chicago	396 U.S. 39	1969
O'Leary v. Kentucky	396 U.S. 40	1969
Brockington v. Rhodes	396 U.S. 41	1969
Hall v. Beals	396 U.S. 45	1969
Anderson's-Black Rock, Inc. v. Pavement Salvage Co.	396 U.S. 57	1969
Bryson v. United States	396 U.S. 64	1969
United States v. Knox	396 U.S. 77	1969
Minor v. United States	396 U.S. 87	1969
Morales v. New York	396 U.S. 102	1969
Conway v. Cal. Adult Auth.	396 U.S. 107	1969
Nat'l Small Shipments Traffic Conference, Inc. v. Middlewest Motor Freight Bureau	396 U.S. 111	1969
Int'l Nickel Co. v. Bayonne	396 U.S. 111	1969
Ambrose v. Wells	396 U.S. 112	1969
Gooding v. Wilson	396 U.S. 112	1969
Perk v. Ohio ex rel. Corrigan	396 U.S. 113	1969
Miss. Power & Light Co. v. Capital Elec. Power Ass'n	396 U.S. 113	1969
Balthazar v. Mari Ltd.	396 U.S. 114	1969
Mathis v. Nelson	396 U.S. 114	1969
Associated Gen. Contractors of Am., Inc. v. United States	396 U.S. 115	1969
Huesdash v. Haskins	396 U.S. 115	1969
United Fuel Gas Co. v. Haden	396 U.S. 116	1969
Ingram v. California	396 U.S. 116	1969
Foster v. Caldwell	396 U.S. 117	1969
McMann v. Ross	396 U.S. 118	1969
Carlos v. New York	396 U.S. 119	1969
Shanker v. Rankin	396 U.S. 120	1969
House of Segram, Inc. v. State Liquor Auth.	396 U.S. 121	1969
First Nat'l Bank v. Dickinson	396 U.S. 122	1969
Detroit & T. Shore Line R.R. Co. v. Transp. Union	396 U.S. 142	1969
City of Chicago v. United States	396 U.S. 162	1969
Zuber v. Allen	396 U.S. 168	1969
Nacirema Operating Co. v. Johnson	396 U.S. 212	1969
Carter v. W. Feliciana Parish Sch. Bd.	396 U.S. 226	1969
Sullivan v. Little Hunting Park, Inc.	396 U.S. 229	1969
NLRB v. J.H. Rutter-Rex Mfg. Co.	396 U.S. 258	1969
Dowell v. Bd. of Ed.	396 U.S. 269	1969
Carlton v. Conner	396 U.S. 272	1969
Am. Smelting & Refining Co. v. Contra Costa Cnty.	396 U.S. 273	1970
Fed. Employees v. City of Denver	396 U.S. 273	1970
In re Reed	396 U.S. 274	1970
Lyon v. Flournoy	396 U.S. 274	1970
Michael Schiavone & Sons, Inc. v. United States	396 U.S. 275	1970
Atchison T. & S.F.R.R. Co. v. United States	396 U.S. 275	1970
Sanchez v. New Mexico	396 U.S. 276	1970
Ariel v. Massachusetts	396 U.S. 276	1970
Doyle v. O'Brien	396 U.S. 277	1970
Swain v. Bd. of Adjustment	396 U.S. 277	1970
Fishkin v. Civil Serv. Comm'n	396 U.S. 278	1970
Bonomo v. Jones	396 U.S. 278	1970
Graham v. Alabama	396 U.S. 279	1970
Schwegmann v. La. Stadium and Exposition Dist.	396 U.S. 279	1970
Ex parte Carrington	396 U.S. 280	1970
New York v. United States	396 U.S. 281	1970
Wade v. Wilson	396 U.S. 282	1970
Carter v. W. Feliciana Parish Sch. Bd.	396 U.S. 290	1970
Gutknecht v. United States	396 U.S. 295	1970
Carter v. Jury Comm'n	396 U.S. 320	1970
Turner v. Fouche	396 U.S. 346	1970
Molinaro v. New Jersey	396 U.S. 365	1970
Churches of God v. Church of God at Sharpsburg, Inc.	396 U.S. 367	1970
Cowgill v. California	396 U.S. 371	1970
Moskowitz v. Power	396 U.S. 373	1970
Blincoe v. Watson	396 U.S. 373	1970
First Fed. Sav. & Loan Ass'n v. Langton	396 U.S. 374	1970
Mills v. Elec. Auto-Lite Co.	396 U.S. 375	1970
Turner v. United States	396 U.S. 398	1970
Evans v. Abney	396 U.S. 435	1970
Breen v. Selective Serv.	396 U.S. 460	1970
Goldstein v. Cox	396 U.S. 471	1970
Sigler v. Parker	396 U.S. 482	1970
Shapiro v. Doe	396 U.S. 488	1970
Florida v. Alabama	396 U.S. 490	1970
United States v. ICC	396 U.S. 491	1970
Ross v. Bernhard	396 U.S. 531	1970
Alabama v. Finch	396 U.S. 552	1970
Mississippi v. Finch	396 U.S. 553	1970
Johnson v. Wasserman	396 U.S. 554	1970
Kirk v. Univ. of Cal.	396 U.S. 554	1970
Stein v. Luken	396 U.S. 555	1970
Providence & Worcester Co. v. United States	396 U.S. 555	1970
TV Pix, Inc. v. Taylor	396 U.S. 556	1970
