= Grant, vacate, remand =

Order issued by U.S. Supreme Court

A grant, vacate, remand (GVR) is a type of order issued by the Supreme Court of the United States in which the Court simultaneously grants a petition for certiorari, vacates the decision of the court below, and remands the case for further proceedings. An order of this sort is typically appropriate when there has been a change in legal circumstances subsequent to the lower court or agency's decision, such as a change in the law, a precedential ruling, or a confession of error; the Supreme Court simply sends the case back to the lower court to be reconsidered in light of the new law or the new precedent. GVR orders are designed to be efficient and thus are not full explications of the law, and have no precedential effect. GVR orders are usually not explained with lengthy opinions.

In 1996, the Supreme Court discussed the appropriateness of GVR orders and upheld their use in a per curiam opinion in the case Lawrence v. Chater.

GVR orders have been the subject of substantial legal attention and criticism.

== Examples ==
Kansas v. Limon: Under Kansas state law, statutory rape charges involving minors were greatly reduced if both parties were teenagers with few years between them. However, the law specifically excluded same-sex sexual conduct. Limon, 18 years old at the time, had performed oral sex on a 14-year-old boy with his consent, which was defined by Kansas law as rape regardless of consent from the 14-year-old. Because they were both male, the statute minimizing Limon's sentence did not apply. He was sentenced to over a decade longer in prison than if it were opposite-sex sexual conduct. When Limon challenged the law, both a trial court and the Kansas Court of Appeals upheld the law, relying in part on the 1986 US Supreme Court case Bowers v. Hardwick. When the Kansas Supreme Court refused to hear the case, Limon filed a petition for a writ of certiorari with the U.S. Supreme Court in 2002.

On June 26, 2003, the Supreme Court decided Lawrence v. Texas. Lawrence overruled the Bowers case on which the Kansas courts had relied; it held that state laws forbidding consensual sex between two people of the same sex are unconstitutional. In light of this, on June 27, the Supreme Court granted Limon's petition, vacated the ruling of the Kansas Court of Appeals, and remanded the case for further consideration. After the Court of Appeals again upheld the law, the Kansas Supreme Court agreed to hear the case and unanimously struck down the part of the law excluding same-sex sexual conduct.

== See also ==
- Procedures of the Supreme Court of the United States
- Shadow docket
