= List of United States Supreme Court cases, volume 395 =

This is a list of all the United States Supreme Court cases from volume 395 of the United States Reports:

Case name	Citation	Date decided
United States v. King	395 U.S. 1	1969
Leary v. United States	395 U.S. 6	1969
United States v. Covington	395 U.S. 57	1969
INS v. Stanisic	395 U.S. 62	1969
YMCA v. United States	395 U.S. 85	1969
Zenith Radio Corp. v. Hazeltine Research, Inc.	395 U.S. 100	1969
Frank v. United States	395 U.S. 147	1969
Thompson v. Travelers Ins. Co.	395 U.S. 161	1969
Fryar v. Oklahoma	395 U.S. 161	1969
Jones v. Illinois	395 U.S. 162	1969
Buckley v. Ohio	395 U.S. 163	1969
Crane v. Cedar Rapids & Iowa City R.R. Co.	395 U.S. 164	1969
Sullivan v. United States	395 U.S. 169	1969
McKart v. United States	395 U.S. 185	1969
Perez v. California	395 U.S. 208	1969
Mattiello v. Connecticut	395 U.S. 209	1969
Trainmen v. O'Connell	395 U.S. 210	1969
Shaw v. California	395 U.S. 211	1969
Lopo v. Saks Fifth Avenue	395 U.S. 211	1969
Everhardt v. New Orleans	395 U.S. 212	1969
Jenkins v. Delaware	395 U.S. 213	1969
United States v. Montgomery Cnty. Bd. of Educ.	395 U.S. 225	1969
Boykin v. Alabama	395 U.S. 238	1969
Harrington v. California	395 U.S. 250	1969
O'Callahan v. Parker	395 U.S. 258	1969
Gaston Cnty. v. United States	395 U.S. 285	1969
Daniel v. Paul	395 U.S. 298	1969
United States v. Estate of Grace	395 U.S. 316	1969
Rodriquez v. United States	395 U.S. 327	1969
Kowan v. California	395 U.S. 335	1969
Egleson v. Massachusetts	395 U.S. 336	1969
Sniadach v. Family Fin. Corp.	395 U.S. 337	1969
Rodrigue v. Aetna Cas. & Sur. Co.	395 U.S. 352	1969
Red Lion Broadcasting Co. v. FCC	395 U.S. 367	1969
Willingham v. Morgan	395 U.S. 402	1969
Jenkins v. McKeithen	395 U.S. 411	1969
Brandenburg v. Ohio	395 U.S. 444	1969
Williams v. CIty of Okla. City	395 U.S. 458	1969
Soranno v. United States	395 U.S. 461	1969
Meeker v. Walker	395 U.S. 461	1969
Ramm v. Ramm	395 U.S. 462	1969
Jones v. United States (1969)	395 U.S. 462	1969
McNeil v. United States	395 U.S. 463	1969
Utah Pub. Serv. Comm'n v. El Paso Natural Gas Co.	395 U.S. 464	1969
Powell v. McCormack	395 U.S. 486	1969
NLRB v. Gissel Packing Co.	395 U.S. 575	1969
Kramer v. Union Free Sch. Dist.	395 U.S. 621	1969
Perkins v. Standard Oil Co.	395 U.S. 642	1969
Lear, Inc. v. Adkins	395 U.S. 653	1969
Noyd v. Bond	395 U.S. 683	1969
Cipriano v. City of Houma	395 U.S. 701	1969
Banks v. California	395 U.S. 708	1969
Bisenius v. Karns	395 U.S. 709	1969
Stanbridge v. New York	395 U.S. 709	1969
Balistrieri v. United States	395 U.S. 710	1969
North Carolina v. Pearce	395 U.S. 711	1969
Chimel v. California	395 U.S. 752	1969
Benton v. Maryland	395 U.S. 784	1969
von Cleef v. New Jersey	395 U.S. 814	1969
Shipley v. California	395 U.S. 818	1969
Proner v. United States	395 U.S. 823	1969
Anderson v. Urban Renewal & Community Dev. Agency	395 U.S. 823	1969
Byers v. City of Okla. City	395 U.S. 824	1969
White v. United States	395 U.S. 824	1969
Moya v. DeBaca	395 U.S. 825	1969
Dillard v. Family Ct.	395 U.S. 825	1969
Rosado v. Wyman	395 U.S. 826	1969
Lindsay v. Kelley	395 U.S. 827	1969
Atlas Engine Works, Inc. v. NLRB	395 U.S. 828	1969
House v. United States	395 U.S. 829	1969
Tillman v. United States	395 U.S. 830	1969
