= List of overruled United States Supreme Court decisions =

This is a list of decisions of the Supreme Court of the United States that have been explicitly overruled, in part or in whole, by a subsequent decision of the Court. It does not include decisions that have been abrogated by subsequent constitutional amendment or by subsequent amending statutes.

The longest period between the original decision and the overruling decision is 136 years, for the common law Admiralty cases Minturn v. Maynard, 58 U.S. (17 How.) 476 decision in 1855, overruled by the Exxon Corp. v. Central Gulf Lines Inc., 500 U.S. 603 decision in 1991. The shortest period is 11 months, for the constitutional law Fourth Amendment (re: search and seizure) cases Robbins v. California, 453 U.S. 420 decision in July 1981, overruled by the United States v. Ross, 456 U.S. 798 decision in June 1982. There have been 16 decisions which have simultaneously overruled more than one earlier decision; of these, three have simultaneously overruled four decisions each: the statutory law regarding habeas corpus decision Hensley v. Municipal Court, 411 U.S. 345 (1973), the constitutional law Eleventh Amendment (re: sovereign immunity) decision Edelman v. Jordan, 415 U.S. 651 (1974) and the constitutional law Fifth Amendment (re: double jeopardy) decision Burks v. United States, 437 U.S. 1 (1978).

== Constitutional ==
=== Article One ===
Commerce Clause

Overruled decision	Overruling decision
Paul v. Virginia, 75 U.S. 168 (1869)	United States v. South-Eastern Underwriters Ass'n, 322 U.S. 533 (1944)
Hammer v. Dagenhart, 247 U.S. 251 (1918)	United States v. Darby Lumber Co., 312 U.S. 100 (1941)
Puget Sound Stevedoring Co. v. State Tax Commission, 302 U.S. 90 (1937)	Department of Revenue v. Washington Stevedoring Cos., 435 U.S. 734 (1978)
Joseph v. Carter & Weekes Stevedoring Co., 330 U.S. 422 (1947)	Department of Revenue v. Washington Stevedoring Cos., 435 U.S. 734 (1978)
Spector Motor Service v. O'Connor, 340 U.S. 602 (1951)	Complete Auto Transit v. Brady, 430 U.S. 274 (1977)
Joseph E. Seagram & Sons v. Hostetter, 384 U.S. 35 (1966)	Healy v. Beer Institute, 491 U.S. 324 (1989)
National Bellas Hess, Inc. v. Department of Revenue of Ill., 386 U.S. 753 (1967)	South Dakota v. Wayfair, Inc., 585 U.S. 162 (2018)
National League of Cities v. Usery, 426 U.S. 833 (1976)	Garcia v. San Antonio Metropolitan Transit Authority, 469 U.S. 528 (1985)
Quill Corp. v. North Dakota, 504 U.S. 298 (1992)	South Dakota v. Wayfair, Inc., 585 U.S. 162 (2018)

Ex post facto

Overruled decision	Overruling decision
Kring v. Missouri, 107 U.S. 221 (1883)	Collins v. Youngblood, 497 U.S. 37 (1990)
Thompson v. Utah, 170 U.S. 343 (1898)	Collins v. Youngblood, 497 U.S. 37 (1990)

Federal tax

Overruled decision	Overruling decision
Pollock v. Farmers' Loan & Trust Co., 157 U.S. 429 (1895) (in part)	South Carolina v. Baker, 485 U.S. 505 (1988)

State import/export tax

Overruled decision	Overruling decision
Low v. Austin, 80 U.S. (13 Wall.) 29 (1872)	Michelin Tire Corp. v. Wages, 423 U.S. 276 (1976)
Hooven & Allison Co. v. Evatt, 324 U.S. 652 (1945)	Limbach v. Hooven & Allison Co., 466 U.S. 353 (1984)

Article One courts

Overruled decision	Overruling decision
Ex parte Bakelite Corp., 279 U.S. 438 (1929)	Glidden Co. v. Zdanok, 370 U.S. 530 (1962)
Williams v. United States, 289 U.S. 553 (1933)	Glidden Co. v. Zdanok, 370 U.S. 530 (1962)
O'Callahan v. Parker, 395 U.S. 258 (1969)	Solorio v. United States, 483 U.S. 435 (1987)

=== Article Two ===
Overruled decision	Overruling decision
Humphrey's Executor v. United States, 295 U.S. 602 (1935)	Trump v. Slaughter, 609 U.S. ___ (2026)

=== Article Three ===
Overruled decision	Overruling decision
Swift v. Tyson, 41 U.S. (16 Pet.) 1 (1842)	Erie Railroad Co. v. Tompkins, 304 U.S. 64 (1938)
Durham v. United States, 401 U.S. 481 (1971)	Dove v. United States, 423 U.S. 325 (1976) (per curiam)

Compensation Clause

Overruled decision	Overruling decision
Evans v. Gore, 253 U.S. 245 (1920)	United States v. Hatter, 532 U.S. 557 (2001)
Miles v. Graham, 268 U.S. 501 (1925)	O'Malley v. Woodrough, 307 U.S. 277 (1939)

=== Article Four ===
Extradition Clause

Overruled decision	Overruling decision
Kentucky v. Dennison, 65 U.S. (24 How.) 66 (1861)	Puerto Rico v. Branstad, 483 U.S. 219 (1987)

Equal footing doctrine

Overruled decision	Overruling decision
Bonelli Cattle Co. v. Arizona, 414 U.S. 313 (1973)	Oregon ex rel. State Land Board v. Corvallis Sand & Gravel Co., 429 U.S. 363 (1977)

Full Faith and Credit

Overruled decision	Overruling decision
Thompson v. Thompson, 226 U. S. 551 (1919)	Vanderbilt v. Vanderbilt, 354 U.S. 416 (1957)
Nevada v. Hall, 440 U.S. 410 (1979)	Franchise Tax Board of California v. Hyatt, 587 U.S. 230 (2019)

=== Article Six ===
Supremacy Clause

Overruled decision	Overruling decision
Reitz v. Mealey, 314 U.S. 33 (1941)	Perez v. Campbell, 402 U.S. 637 (1971)
Kesler v. Department of Public Safety, 369 U.S. 153 (1962)	Perez v. Campbell, 402 U.S. 637 (1971)

=== First Amendment ===
Establishment Clause

Overruled decision	Overruling decision
Lemon v. Kurtzman, 403 U.S. 602 (1971)	Kennedy v. Bremerton School District, 597 U.S. 507 (2022)
Meek v. Pittinger, 421 U.S. 349 (1975)	Mitchell v. Helms, 530 U.S. 793 (2000)
Wolman v. Walter, 433 U.S. 229 (1977)	Mitchell v. Helms, 530 U.S. 793 (2000)
School District of City of Grand Rapids v. Ball, 473 U.S. 373 (1985)	Agostini v. Felton, 521 U.S. 203 (1997)
Aguilar v. Felton, 473 U.S. 402 (1985)	Agostini v. Felton, 521 U.S. 203 (1997)

Free speech clause

Overruled decision	Overruling decision
Whitney v. California, 274 U.S. 357 (1927)	Brandenburg v. Ohio, 395 U.S. 444 (1969)
Minersville School District v. Gobitis, 310 U.S. 586 (1940)	West Virginia State Board of Education v. Barnette, 319 U.S. 624 (1943)
Valentine v. Chrestensen, 316 U.S. 52 (1942)	Virginia State Pharmacy Board v. Virginia Citizens Consumer Council, 425 U.S. 748 (1976)
Roth v. United States, 354 U.S. 476 (1957)	Miller v. California, 413 U.S. 15 (1973)
Amalgamated Food Employees Union Local 590 v. Logan Valley Plaza, 391 U.S. 308 (1968)	Hudgens v. National Labor Relations Board, 424 U.S. 507 (1976)
Abood v. Detroit Board of Education, 431 U.S. 209 (1977)	Janus v. AFSCME, 585 U.S. 878 (2018)
Austin v. Michigan Chamber of Commerce, 494 U.S. 652 (1990)	Citizens United v. FEC, 558 U.S. 310 (2010)
FEC v. Colorado Republican Federal Campaign Committee, 533 U.S. 431 (2001)	National Republican Senatorial Committee v. FEC, 609 U.S. ___ (2026)
McConnell v. Federal Election Commission, 540 U.S. 93 (2003) (in part)	Citizens United v. FEC, 558 U.S. 310 (2010)

=== Second Amendment ===
Overruled decision	Overruling decision
United States v. Cruikshank, 92 U.S. 542 (1876)	McDonald v. City of Chicago, 561 U.S. 742 (2010)
Presser v. Illinois, 116 U.S. 252 (1886)	McDonald v. City of Chicago, 561 U.S. 742 (2010)
Miller v. Texas, 153 U.S. 535 (1894)	McDonald v. City of Chicago, 561 U.S. 742 (2010)

=== Fourth Amendment ===
Overruled decision	Overruling decision
Olmstead v. United States, 277 U.S. 438 (1928)	Katz v. United States, 389 U.S. 347 (1967)
Harris v. United States, 331 U.S. 145 (1947)	Chimel v. California, 395 U.S. 752 (1969)
Wolf v. Colorado, 338 U.S. 25 (1949)	Mapp v. Ohio, 367 U.S. 643 (1961)
Lustig v. United States, 338 U.S. 74 (1949)	Elkins v. United States, 364 U.S. 206 (1960)
United States v. Rabinowitz, 339 U.S. 56 (1950)	Chimel v. California, 395 U.S. 752 (1969)
Jones v. United States, 362 U.S. 257 (1960)	United States v. Salvucci, 448 U.S. 83 (1980)
Aguilar v. Texas, 378 U.S. 108 (1964)	Illinois v. Gates, 462 U.S. 213 (1983)
Spinelli v. United States, 393 U.S. 410 (1969)	Illinois v. Gates, 462 U.S. 213 (1983)
Arkansas v. Sanders, 442 U.S. 753 (1979)	California v. Acevedo, 500 U.S. 565 (1991)
Robbins v. California, 453 U.S. 420 (1981)	United States v. Ross, 456 U.S. 798 (1982)

=== Fifth Amendment ===
Grand jury

Overruled decision	Overruling decision
Ex parte Bain, 121 U.S. 1 (1887)	United States v. Miller (1985), 471 U.S. 130 (1985)

Double jeopardy

Overruled decision	Overruling decision
Coffey v. United States, 116 U.S. 436 (1886)	United States v. One Assortment of 89 Firearms, 465 U.S. 354 (1984)
Brantley v. Georgia, 217 U.S. 284 (1910) (per curiam)	Price v. Georgia, 398 U.S. 323 (1970)
Palko v. Connecticut, 302 U.S. 319 (1937)	Benton v. Maryland, 395 U.S. 784 (1969)
Bryan v. United States, 338 U.S. 552 (1950)	Burks v. United States, 437 U.S. 1 (1978)
Sapir v. United States, 348 U.S. 373 (1955)	Burks v. United States, 437 U.S. 1 (1978)
Yates v. United States, 354 U.S. 298 (1957) (in part)	Burks v. United States, 437 U.S. 1 (1978)
Hoag v. New Jersey, 356 U.S. 464 (1958)	Ashe v. Swenson, 397 U.S. 436 (1970)
Forman v. United States, 361 U.S. 416 (1960)	Burks v. United States, 437 U.S. 1 (1978)
United States v. Jenkins, 420 U.S. 358 (1975)	United States v. Scott, 437 U.S. 82 (1978)
United States v. Halper, 490 U.S. 435 (1989)	Hudson v. United States, 522 U.S. 93 (1997)
Grady v. Corbin, 495 U.S. 508 (1990)	United States v. Dixon, 509 U.S. 688 (1993)

Self-incrimination

Overruled decision	Overruling decision
Twining v. New Jersey, 211 U.S. 78 (1908)	Malloy v. Hogan, 378 U.S. 1 (1964)
Cohen v. Hurley, 366 U.S. 117 (1961)	Spevack v. Klein, 385 U.S. 511 (1967)

Due process

Overruled decision	Overruling decision
Adkins v. Children's Hospital, 261 U.S. 525 (1923)	West Coast Hotel Co. v. Parrish, 300 U.S. 379 (1937)
Korematsu v. United States, 323 U.S. 214 (1944)	Trump v. Hawaii, 585 U.S. 667 (2018)

Takings Clause

Overruled decision	Overruling decision
Agins v. City of Tiburon, 447 U.S. 255, (1980)	Lingle v. Chevron U.S.A. Inc., 544 U.S. 528 (2005)
Williamson County Regional Planning Comm'n v. Hamilton Bank of Johnson City, 473 U.S. 172 (1985)	Knick v. Township of Scott, 588 U.S. 180 (2019)

=== Sixth Amendment ===
Jury right

Overruled decision	Overruling decision
Sinclair v. United States, 279 U.S. 263 (1929)	United States v. Gaudin, 515 U.S. 506 (1995)
Apodaca v. Oregon, 406 U.S. 404 (1972)	Ramos v. Louisiana, 590 U.S. 83 (2020)
Walton v. Arizona, 497 U.S. 639 (1990)	Ring v. Arizona, 536 U.S. 584 (2002)
Harris v. United States, 536 U.S. 545 (2002)	Alleyne v. United States, 570 U.S. 99 (2013)

Confrontation Clause

Overruled decision	Overruling decision
Delli Paoli v. United States, 352 U.S. 232 (1957)	Bruton v. United States, 391 U.S. 123 (1968)
Ohio v. Roberts, 448 U.S. 56 (1980)	Crawford v. Washington, 541 U.S. 36 (2004)

Right to counsel

Overruled decision	Overruling decision
Betts v. Brady, 316 U.S. 455 (1942)	Gideon v. Wainwright, 372 U.S. 335 (1963)
Baldasar v. Illinois, 446 U.S. 222 (1980)	Nichols v. United States, 511 U.S. 738 (1994)
Michigan v. Jackson, 475 U.S. 625 (1986)	Montejo v. Louisiana, 556 U.S. 778 (2009)

=== Eighth Amendment ===
Overruled decision	Overruling decision
Booth v. Maryland, 482 U.S. 496 (1987)	Payne v. Tennessee, 501 U.S. 808 (1991)
South Carolina v. Gathers, 490 U.S. 805 (1989)	Payne v. Tennessee, 501 U.S. 808 (1991)
Penry v. Lynaugh, 492 U.S. 302 (1989)	Atkins v. Virginia, 536 U.S. 304 (2002)
Stanford v. Kentucky, 492 U.S. 361 (1989)	Roper v. Simmons, 543 U.S. 551 (2005)

=== Tenth Amendment ===
Overruled decision	Overruling decision
National League of Cities v. Usery, 426 U.S. 833 (1976)	Garcia v. San Antonio Metropolitan Transit Authority, 469 U.S. 528 (1985)

=== Eleventh Amendment ===
Overruled decision	Overruling decision
Ford Motor Co. v. Department of Treasury, 323 U.S. 459 (1945)	Lapides v. Board of Regents of University System of Georgia, 535 U.S. 613 (2002)
Parden v. Terminal Railroad Co. of Alabama Docks Department, 377 U.S. 184 (1964)	Welch v. Texas Department of Highways & Transportation, 483 U.S. 468 (1987)
Parden v. Terminal Railroad Co. of Alabama Docks Department, 377 U.S. 184 (1964)	College Savings Bank v. Florida Prepaid Postsecondary Education Expense Board, 527 U.S. 666 (1999)
Shapiro v. Thompson, 394 U.S. 618 (1969) (in part)	Edelman v. Jordan, 415 U.S. 651 (1974)
Wyman v. Bowens, 397 U.S. 49 (1970)	Edelman v. Jordan, 415 U.S. 651 (1974)
State Department of Health & Rehabilitation Services. v. Zarate, 407 U.S. 918 (1972)	Edelman v. Jordan, 415 U.S. 651 (1974)
Sterrett v. Mothers’ & Children’s Rights Organization, 409 U.S. 809 (1973)	Edelman v. Jordan, 415 U.S. 651 (1974)
Pennsylvania v. Union Gas Co., 491 U.S. 1 (1989)	Seminole Tribe of Florida v. Florida, 517 U.S. 44 (1997)

=== Fourteenth Amendment ===
Procedural due process

Overruled decision	Overruling decision
Simpson v. Rice, 395 U.S. 711 (1969)	Alabama v. Smith, 490 U.S. 794 (1989)
Arnett v. Kennedy, 416 U.S. 134 (1974)	Cleveland Board of Education v. Loudermill, 470 U.S. 532 (1985)
Parratt v. Taylor, 451 U.S. 527 (1981)	Daniels v. Williams, 474 U.S. 327 (1986)

Substantive due process

Overruled decision	Overruling decision
Liggett Co. v. Baldridge, 278 U.S. 105 (1928)	North Dakota Pharmacy Board v. Snyder’s Drug Stores, 414 U.S. 156 (1973)
Roe v. Wade, 410 U.S. 113 (1973)	Dobbs v. Jackson Women’s Health Organization, 597 U.S. 215 (2022)
City of Akron v. Akron Center for Reproductive Health, 462 U.S. 416 (1983)	Planned Parenthood v. Casey, 505 U.S. 833 (1992)
Thornburgh v. American College of Obstetricians & Gynecologists, 476 U.S. 747 (1986)	Planned Parenthood v. Casey, 505 U.S. 833 (1992)
Bowers v. Hardwick, 478 U.S. 186 (1986)	Lawrence v. Texas, 539 U.S. 558 (2003)
Planned Parenthood v. Casey, 505 U.S. 833 (1992)	Dobbs v. Jackson Women’s Health Organization, 597 U.S. 215 (2022)

Equal protection

Overruled decision	Overruling decision
Pace v. Alabama, 106 U.S. (16 Otto) 583 (1883)	McLaughlin v. Florida, 379 U.S. 184 (1964)
Plessy v. Ferguson, 163 U.S. 537 (1896)	Brown v. Board of Education, 347 US 483 (1954)
Quaker City Cab Co. v. Pennsylvania, 277 U.S. 389 (1928)	Lehnhausen v. Lake Shore Auto Parts Co., 410 U.S. 356 (1973)
Breedlove v. Suttles, 302 U.S. 277 (1937)	Harper v. Virginia State Board of Elections, 383 U.S. 663 (1966)
Goesaert v. Cleary, 335 U.S. 464 (1948)	Craig v. Boren, 429 U.S. 190 (1976)
Morey v. Doud, 354 U.S. 457 (1957)	City of New Orleans v. Dukes, 427 U.S. 297 (1976) (per curiam)
Hoyt v. Florida, 368 U.S. 57 (1961)	Taylor v. Louisiana, 419 U.S. 522 (1975)
Swain v. Alabama, 380 U.S. 202 (1965)	Batson v. Kentucky, 476 U.S. 79 (1986)
Baker v. Nelson, 409 U.S. 810 (1972)	Obergefell v. Hodges, 576 U.S. 644 (2015)
Metro Broadcasting, Inc. v. FCC, 497 U.S. 547 (1990)	Adarand Constructors, Inc. v. Peña, 515 U.S. 200 (1995)

Citizenship

Overruled decision	Overruling decision
Perez v. Brownell, 356 U.S. 44 (1958)	Afroyim v. Rusk, 387 U.S. 253 (1967)

== Statutory ==
=== 42 U.S.C. § 1983 ===
Overruled decision	Overruling decision
Collins v. Hardyman, 341 U.S. 651 (1951)	Griffin v. Breckenridge, 403 U.S. 88 (1971)
Monroe v. Pape, 365 U.S. 167 (1961) (in part)	Monell v. Department of Social Services of the City of New York, 436 U.S. 658 (1978)

=== Administrative ===
Overruled decision	Overruling decision
Chevron U.S.A., Inc. v. Natural Resources Defense Council, Inc., 467 U.S. 837 (1984)	Loper Bright Enterprises v. Raimondo, 603 U.S. 369 (2024)

=== Antitrust ===
Overruled decision	Overruling decision
Dr. Miles Medical Co. v. John D. Park & Sons Co., 220 U.S. 373 (1911)	Leegin Creative Leather Products, Inc. v. PSKS, Inc., 551 U.S. 877 (2007)
United States v. Yellow Cab Co., 332 U.S. 218 (1947)	Copperweld Corp. v. Independence Tube Corp., 467 U.S. 752 (1984)
Kiefer-Stewart Co. v. Jos. E. Seagram & Sons, 340 U.S. 211 (1951)	Copperweld Corp. v. Independence Tube Corp., 467 U.S. 752 (1984)
United States v. Arnold, Schwinn & Co., 388 U.S. 365 (1967)	Continental Television, Inc. v. GTE Sylvania, Inc., 433 U.S. 36 (1977)
Albrecht v. Herald Co., 390 U.S. 145 (1968)	State Oil Co. v. Khan, 522 U.S. 3 (1997)

=== Arbitration ===
Overruled decision	Overruling decision
Wilko v. Swan, 346 U.S. 427 (1953)	Rodriguez de Quijas v. Shearson/American Express Inc., 490 U.S. 477 (1989)

=== Federal crime ===
Overruled decision	Overruling decision
Ward v. Race Horse, 163 U.S. 504 (1896)	Herrera v. Wyoming, 587 U.S. 329 (2019)
United States v. Bramblett, 348 U.S. 503 (1955)	Hubbard v. United States, 514 U.S. 695 (1995)

=== Habeas ===
Overruled decision	Overruling decision
Wales v. Whitney (1885)	Hensley v. Municipal Court, 411 U.S. 345 (1973)
Baker v. Grice, 169 U.S. 284 (1898)	Hensley v. Municipal Court, 411 U.S. 345 (1973)
Johnson v. Hoy, 227 U.S. 245 (1913)	Hensley v. Municipal Court, 411 U.S. 345 (1973)
Stallings v. Splain, 253 U.S. 339 (1920)	Hensley v. Municipal Court, 411 U.S. 345 (1973)
McNally v. Hill, 293 U.S. 131 (1934)	Peyton v. Rowe, 391 U.S. 54 (1968)
Ahrens v. Clark, 335 U.S. 188 (1948) (in part)	Braden v. 30th Judicial Circuit Court of Kentucky, 410 U.S. 484 (1973)
Parker v. Ellis, 362 U.S. 574 (1960) (per curiam)	Carafas v. LaVallee, 391 U.S. 234 (1968)
Fay v. Noia, 372 U.S. 391 (1963)	Coleman v. Thompson, 501 U.S. 722 (1991)
Teague v. Lane (in part), 489 U.S. 288 (1989)	Edwards v. Vannoy, 593 U.S. 255 (2021)

=== Labor ===
Overruled decision	Overruling decision
Moore v. Illinois Central Railroad, 312 U.S. 630 (1941)	Andrews v. Louisville & Nashville Railroad, 406 U.S. 320 (1972)
United Auto Workers v. Wisconsin Employment Relations Board, 336 U.S. 245 (1949)	International Ass'n of Machinists & Aerospace Workers v. Wisconsin Employment Relations Commission, 427 U.S. 132 (1976)
Sinclair Refining Co. v. Atkinson, 370 U.S. 195 (1962)	Boys Markets, Inc. v. Retail Clerks Union, 398 U.S. 235 (1970)

== Common law ==
=== Absolute and qualified immunity ===
Overruled decision	Overruling decision
Saucier v. Katz, 533 U.S. 194 (2001)	Pearson v. Callahan, 555 U.S. 223 (2009)

=== Admiralty ===
Overruled decision	Overruling decision
Rose v. Himley, 8 U.S. (4 Cranch) 241 (1808)	Hudson v. Guestier, 10 U.S. (6 Cranch) 281 (1810)
The Thomas Jefferson v. District Court of Kentucky, 23 U.S. (10 Wheat.) 428 (1825)	The Genesee Chief v. Fitzhugh, 53 U.S. (12 How.) 443 (1851)
The Schooner Catherine v. Dickinson, 58 U.S. (17 How.) 170 (1854)	United States v. Reliable Transfer Co., 421 U.S. 397 (1975)
Minturn v. Maynard, 58 U.S. (17 How.) 476 (1855)	Exxon Corp. v. Central Gulf Lines Inc. 500 U.S. 603 (1991)
The Harrisburg, 119 U.S. 199 (1886)	Moragne v. States Marine Lines, Inc., 398 U.S. 375 (1970)

=== Contract ===
Overruled decision	Overruling decision
Sheehy v. Mandeville, 10 U.S. (6 Cranch) 253 (1810)	Mason v. Eldred, 73 U.S. (6 Wall.) 231 (1868)

=== Res judicata ===
Overruled decision	Overruling decision
Triplett v. Lowell, 297 U.S. 638 (1936)	Blonder-Tongue Labs v. University of Illinois Foundation, 402 U.S. 313 (1971)

== See also ==
- List of abrogated U.S. Supreme Court decisions
- List of landmark court decisions in the United States
