= Department of Revenue v. Washington Stevedoring Cos. =

Department of Revenue v. Association of Stevedores et al.
- Supreme Court of the United States

Argued January 16–17, 1978 Decided April 26, 1978
- Full case name: Department of Revenue of Washington v Association of Washington Stevedoring Companies
- Docket no.: 76-1706
- Citations: 435 U.S. 734 (more)
- Argument: Oral argument

Case history
- Prior: 88 Wn.2d 315, 559 P.2d 997. Appeal from the Washington Supreme Court

Holding
- The State of Washington's business and occupation tax on the interstate commerce activity of stevedoring within the State does not violate the Commerce Clause.

Court membership
- Chief Justice Warren E. Burger Associate Justices William J. Brennan Jr. · Potter Stewart; Byron White · Thurgood Marshall; Harry Blackmun · Lewis F. Powell Jr. William Rehnquist · John P. Stevens

Case opinions
- Majority: Blackmun, joined by Burger, Stewart, White, Marshall, Rehnquist, Stevens, Powell (in part)
- Concurrence: Powell
- Brennan took no part in the consideration or decision of the case.

Laws applied
- Commerce Clause, Import-Export Clause
- This case overturned a previous ruling or rulings
- Puget Sound Stevedoring Co. v. State Tax Commission, 302 U.S. 90 (1937), Joseph v. Carter & Weekes Stevedoring Co., 330 U.S. 422 (1947)

Washington v. Association of Stevedores, 435 U.S. 734 (1978) was a Supreme Court case in which the court held that the State of Washington's business and occupation tax, which may affect interstate commerce, does not violate the Commerce Clause, thus enabling the states to "under appropriate conditions, tax directly the privilege of conducting interstate business." This case directly overruled Puget Sound Stevedoring Co. v State Tax Commission and Joseph v. Carter & Weekes Stevedoring Co.. This case expanded the rights of states to tax interstate commerce activity within their states.

== Historical context ==
The plaintiffs in this case are the Association of Private Stevedoring Companies and the Washington Public Ports Association, who jointly filed their suit as the Association of Washington Stevedoring Companies. Stevedoring is the practice of loading and unloading ships at dockyards. The tax on the stevedoring industry involved the labor produced by loading and unloading ships involved in interstate commerce.

This case was raised against the Washington State Department of Revenue in regards to its enforcement of Washington Administrative Code 458-20-193D which states:

Examples of Taxable Income:

(3) Compensation received by contracting, stevedoring or loading companies for services performed within this state is taxable.

Persons engaged in stevedoring and associated activities involving the movement of goods and commodities in waterborne interstate or foreign commerce are subject to business tax at the rate .0033 upon the gross proceeds from such activities [Emphasis added]

The suit was filed within the Thurston County Superior Court which ruled that the administrative code "contravenes the interstate commerce clause (U.S. Const. art. 1, § 8) and the import-export clause (U.S. Const. art. 1, § 10)", thereby granting relief for the Stevedoring company. The Department of Revenue appealed to the Washington Supreme Court which also affirmed the verdict of the trial court. The Washington Supreme Court affirmed the trial court in its chosen interpretation of the cases of Puget and Joseph, saying,

"We find the two cases to be indistinguishable, factually, from the instant case; hence, we also adhere to them, and affirm the trial court." - Washington Supreme Court Opinion, Justice Robert T. Hunter

In the Washington Supreme Court case, Justice Robert F. Utter authored a dissenting opinion, with Justice James M. Dolliver joining, saying,

"The clause here at issue is the commerce clause rather than the import-export clause. A state generally has broader discretion in taxing activities than goods. Canton Railroad Co. v. Rogan, 340 U.S. 511 (1951)" - Washington Supreme Court Dissent, Justice Robert. F. Utter

The Department of Revenue appealed to the Supreme Court of the United States, which granted certiorari for the 1977-1978 term.

== Supreme Court Decision ==
In a unanimous decision, Justice Brennan not participating, the court ruled in favor of the Department of Revenue, upholding the Washington Administrative code in question. After two days of oral argument, the decision was announced on April 26, 1978. The majority opinion was authored by Justice Blackmun and joined by all justices but Justice Powell, who joined in all but part III-B and filed a separate concurrence in part and in judgement.

The decision upheld the administrative code while directly overruling the cases which the trial court and Washington Supreme Court propped their verdicts by. Their current verdict relied on Complete Auto Transit, Inc. v. Brady, 430 U.S. 274 (1977) which it had just ruled on a year prior, and used it to affirm that,

"[In] Complete Auto Transit, Inc. v. Brady, where the Court held that a State, under appropriate conditions, may tax directly the privilege of conducting interstate business, requires such rejection [of Puget Sound and Carter & Weekes]."

With that establishment in Complete Auto, since the tax in the prior Stevedoring cases were practically indistinguishable from the one in the current case, with this more recent interpretation of the Commerce Clause and precedent it ruled that the prior cases must be overruled. It further cemented the fact that,

"Complete Auto recognized that a State has a significant interest in exacting from interstate commerce its fair share of the cost of state government" and "All tax burdens do not impermissibly impede interstate commerce."

In summary, it held the administrative code was lawful to maintain state interests in collecting a share from interstate commerce, a principle which wasn't entirely repugnant to the Commerce Clause.

== Concurrence of Justice Powell ==
The concurrence of Justice Powell rests mainly in the fact that "the Court's opinion appears to "resurrect the discarded "direct-indirect" test, I cannot join it." Justice Powell believes the majority opinion is even slightly contradictory due to the arbitrary nature that

"Canton R. Co. v. Rogan, 340 U. S. 511 (1951), indicates that this [tax] is a tax "not on the goods, but on the handling of them at the port." Id. at 340 U. S. 514 (emphasis in original). While Canton R. Co. provides precedential support for the proposition that a tax of this kind is not invalid under the Import-Export Clause, its rather artificial distinction between taxes on the handling of the goods and taxes on the goods themselves harks back to the arid "direct-indirect" distinction that we rejected in Complete Auto Transit, Inc. v. Brady, 430 U. S. 274 (1977), in favor of analysis framed in light of economic reality."

The rest of Justice Powell's concurrence is also inline with various arbitrary issues in regards to the identification of the tax.
