= Prosecutorial vindictiveness =

Violation of due process in US law

Prosecutorial vindictiveness occurs when a prosecutor retaliates against a defendant for exercising a constitutional or statutory right by increasing the number or severity of the charges being levied against him. The United States Supreme Court has held that, following its 1974 ruling in Blackledge v. Perry, as well as a previous ruling in North Carolina v. Pearce in 1969, establishing the concept of prosecutorial vindictiveness and declaring that it constitutes a violation of a defendant's right to due process.

== History and background ==
The Supreme Court established the doctrine of judicial vindictiveness in North Carolina v. Pearce in 1969, finding a due process violation where the court increased a defendant's sentence in response to the defendant's motion and efforts made by him to challenge his original convictions. In Blackledge v. Perry, decided in 1974, the court extended the holding of Pearce to include actions taken by prosecutors in response to a defendant's exercise of a constitutional or statutory right. In Blackledge, the prosecutor increased the severity of a defendant's charge from a misdemeanor to a felony after the defendant moved for a trial de novo. (Note: Typically, when one successfully moves for a trial de novo (a Latin expression meaning "afresh", "anew", or "beginning again"), an appellate court reviews the case anew after one party appeals a ruling already made.) In finding a due process violation, the court declared a concern that fear of prosecutorial vindictiveness would very likely have a chilling effect on a defendant's willingness to exercise his rights to the fullest extent possible. Thus, the doctrine has evolved not only as a mechanism for a defendant to raise a due process claim in a particular case, but also as a preventive means for insulating future defendants from the fear of prosecutorial retaliation for exercising their constitutional rights in a similar manner.

== Application of the doctrine ==
A defendant may seek to prove prosecutorial vindictiveness by showing either actual vindictiveness or raising a presumption of vindictiveness.

=== Actual vindictiveness ===
Actual prosecutorial vindictiveness requires the defendant to produce objective evidence showing that the prosecutor intended for his actions to punish a defendant for asserting a right they are entitled to under the constitution. For example, in United States v. DeMarco (1977), the court found actual vindictiveness where the government threatened to "up the ante" to discourage a defendant from exercising his right to change the trial venue. A showing of actual vindictiveness by the prosecutor is sufficient to prove a violation of the defendant's due process rights.

=== Presumed vindictiveness ===
In certain circumstances, vindictiveness may be presumed without a showing of malicious or retaliatory intent on the part of the prosecutor. Instead, the defendant may show that the circumstances of the prosecutor's charging decision posed a realistic likelihood of vindictiveness. Courts have, so far, justified this presumption using two reasons. First, it serves as a means of deterring prosecutorial conduct that, regardless of the presence of actual vindictiveness, could deter future defendants from exercising protected constitutional or statutory rights. Second, it recognizes the difficulty of proving improper motive in many cases.

The Supreme Court has, so far, found a presumption of vindictiveness to apply where the defendant is charged or indicted, exercises his right to a trial de novo, and the prosecutor subsequently increases the number or severity of the charges levied against the defendant. In contrast, the Supreme Court has held that a presumption of vindictiveness does not apply in the plea-bargaining context where the prosecutor carries out a threat to bring additional charges against a defendant who refuses to plead guilty as part of a given plea deal provided by the prosecutor. The Court found that even where a prosecutor threatens to bring increased charges at the plea-bargaining stage, there is no element of impermissible penalty or punishment during the "give-and-take" of the plea-bargaining process. The Supreme Court has also declined to recognize a presumption of vindictiveness where a defendant refused to plead guilty, invoked his right to a trial by jury in a District Court, and the prosecutor subsequently increased the charges against him from a misdemeanor to a felony. The Court found an "inflexible presumption of prosecutorial vindictiveness" to be inappropriate in the pretrial setting, where a prosecutor's case against a defendant may not yet have fully "crystallized." Following the Court's ruling, lower federal courts have generally held a presumption of vindictiveness to be inapplicable in a pretrial setting.

==== Showing a presumption of vindictiveness ====
Lower federal courts differ on the showing a defendant must make to establish a presumption of vindictiveness outside of the specific scenarios recognized by the Supreme Court. Some circuits, including the Seventh Circuit, D.C. Circuit, the Second Circuit, the Tenth Circuit, and the Eighth Circuit accept a demonstration of facts that give rise to a reasonable likelihood of vindictiveness, usually an increase in the severity or number of charges after the defendant exercises a statutory or constitutional right. The Sixth Circuit employs a test requiring the court to assess whether "a reasonable person would think there existed a realistic likelihood of vindictiveness" based on the particular facts of the case. The Ninth Circuit has held that a defendant is entitled to a presumption of vindictiveness where he can demonstrate that a prosecutor increased charges under circumstances giving rise to an appearance of vindictiveness; the appearance of vindictiveness arises where the defendant can demonstrate a reasonable likelihood that the prosecutor would not have increased the charges but for the defendant's exercise of a constitutional or statutory right. The Fifth Circuit has held that a presumption of vindictiveness exists where there exists a realistic likelihood of vindictiveness, but that there is "no presumption of vindictiveness if in the context of the entire proceedings any objective event or combination of events in those proceedings should indicate to a reasonable minded defendant that the prosecutor's decision was motivated by some purpose other than a vindictive desire to deter or punish appeals."

Some lower courts, including the Eleventh, Seventh, Second, Sixth, and D.C. Circuits, have all held that there is no presumption of vindictiveness where a prosecutor brings new charges based on conduct different from that upon which the prior charges are based. The Sixth Circuit has also distinguished cases where the prosecutor adds a charge for a different and distinct offense based on the same conduct as that upon which the prior charges were based, and finds that a presumption of legal vindictiveness would be justified in this scenario.

==== Rebutting a presumption of vindictiveness ====
Once a defendant has established a presumption of vindictiveness, a prosecutor may rebut the presumption by providing evidence of a non-retaliatory, objective reason for the increased charging decision. Lower courts differ on what constitutes an acceptable objective reason. Courts have accepted a showing that the prosecutor's charging decision was based on the discovery of new evidence, a prosecutor's inexperience, mistake of law, or an intervening event.

The Supreme Court has not addressed the question of whether a change in the prosecutor imposing the increased charges, where the prosecutors are independent, is sufficient to rebut a presumption of vindictiveness. However, in Thigpen v. Roberts, the Court found that where there is a change in prosecutor from the initial charging decision and the increased charging decision, but the prosecutors are subject to the same "institutional pressure" that could motivate vindictive prosecution, the viability of the presumption "does not hinge on the continued involvement of a particular individual." The Eighth Circuit has found a presumption of vindictiveness inappropriate where two independent prosecutors are involved.

== Remedies ==
Because the Supreme Court has held prosecutorial vindictiveness to constitute a violation of a defendant's right to due process, where a defendant succeeds on a claim of vindictiveness, his or her conviction will ordinarily be set aside. This remedy controls even where the conviction "was entered pursuant to a counseled plea of guilty."

== See also ==
- Prosecutorial discretion
