= List of abrogated United States Supreme Court decisions =

This is a list of decisions of the United States Supreme Court that have been abrogated (superseded), in whole or in part, by a subsequent constitutional amendment or Congressional statute. This list does not included decisions overruled by the subsequent Supreme Court decisions.

== By Constitutional amendment ==
Abrogated decision	Abrogating amendment	Summary (topic) of amendment
Chisholm v. Georgia, 2 U.S. 419 (1793)	Eleventh Amendment (1795)	Civil jurisdiction (state sovereign immunity) of the States
Dred Scott v. Sandford, 60 U.S. 393 (1857)	Thirteenth Amendment (1865)	Formally abolished slavery and involuntary servitude in the United States, excluding penal labor.
Dred Scott v. Sandford, 60 U.S. 393 (1857)	Fourteenth Amendment (1868)	Granted citizenship to persons born or naturalized in the United States; forbade U.S. states from abridging citizens privileges or immunities, depriving persons of due process, or denying persons of equal protection under the law.
Dred Scott v. Sandford, 60 U.S. 393 (1857)	Fifteenth Amendment (1870)	Right of citizens to vote is not to be abridged on account of race, color, or previous condition of servitude.
Pollock v. Farmers' Loan & Trust Co., 157 U.S. 429 (1895), affirmed on rehearing, 158 U.S. 601 (1895)	Sixteenth Amendment (1913)	Ability to impose federal income tax on all forms of income without state apportionment
Minor v. Happersett, 88 U.S. 162 (1875)	Nineteenth Amendment (1920)	Right of citizens to vote is not to be abridged on account of sex.
Breedlove v. Suttles, 302 U.S. 277 (1937)	Twenty-fourth Amendment (1964)	Right of citizens to vote is not to be abridged on account of failure to pay any poll or other form of tax.
Oregon v. Mitchell, 400 U.S. 112 (1970)	Twenty-sixth Amendment (1971)	Right of citizens to vote is not be abridged on account of age, provided the citizen is at least 18 years of age.

== By federal statute ==
=== Administrative law ===
Abrogated decision	Abrogating statute
FDA v. Brown & Williamson Tobacco Corp., 529 U.S. 120 (2000)	Family Smoking Prevention and Tobacco Control Act, Pub. L. No. 111-31, 123 Stat. 1776, 1858 (2009)

=== Arbitration ===
Abrogated decision	Abrogating statute
Baltimore Contractors, Inc. v. Bodinger, 348 U.S. 176 (1955)	Judicial Improvements & Access to Justice Act, Pub. L. No. 100-702, § 1019, 102 Stat. 4642, 4646 (1988)
Mitsubishi Motors Corp. v. Soler Chrysler-Plymouth, Inc., 473 U.S. 614 (1985)	Motor Vehicle Franchise Contract Arbitration Fairness Act, Pub L. No. 107-273, 116 Stat. 1758 (2002).

=== Bankruptcy ===
Abrogated decision	Abrogating statute
National Labor Relations Board v. Bildisco & Bildisco, 465 U.S. 513 (1984)	Bankruptcy Amendments and Federal Judgeship Act of 1984, Pub. L. No. 98-353, tit. III, § 541(a), 98 Stat. 333, 390 (codified at 11 U.S.C. § 1113)
Pennsylvania Department of Public Welfare v. Davenport, 495 U.S. 552 (1990)	Crime Control Act of 1990, Pub. L. No. 101-647, § 3103, 104 Stat. 4789, 4916
United States v. Nordic Village, 503 U.S. 30 (1992)	Bankruptcy Reform Act of 1994, Pub. L. No. 103-394, tit. I, § 113, 108 Stat. 4106, 4117 (codified at 11 U.S.C. § 106)
Fidelity Financial Services, Inc. v. Fink, 522 U.S. 211 (1998)	Bankruptcy Abuse Prevention and Consumer Protection Act of 2005, Pub. L. No. 109-8, tit. XII, § 1222, 119 Stat 23, 196 (codified at 11 U.S.C. § 547(c)(3)(B))

=== Crime ===
Abrogated decision	Abrogating statute
United States v. Paul, 31 U.S. (6 Pet.) 141 (1832)	Act of June 25, 1948, § 1, 62 Stat. 686, 686 (codified at 18 U.S.C. § 13)
United States v. Shackleford, 59 U.S. (18 How.) 588 (1855)	Act of Mar. 3, 1865, ch. 86, § 2, 13 Stat. 500, 500
Caminetti v. United States, 242 U.S. 470 (1917)	Child Sexual Abuse & Pornography Act of 1986, Pub. L. No. 99-628, § 5(b)(1), 100 Stat. 3510–11
United States v. Teamsters Local 807, 315 U.S. 521 (1942)	Hobbs Act (codified at 18 U.S.C. § 1951)
Williams v. United States, 327 U.S. 711 (1946)	Sexual Abuse Act of 1986, Pub. L. No. 99-654, § 2, 100 Stat. 3660, 3660–63
Cleveland v. United States, 329 U.S. 14 (1946)	Child Sexual Abuse & Pornography Act of 1986, Pub. L. No. 99-628, § 5(b)(1), 100 Stat. 3510–11
United States v. Park, 421 U.S. 658 (1975)	Prescription Drug Marketing Act, Pub. L. No. 100-293, § 4, 102 Stat. 95, 96 (1988)
United States v. Sells Engineering Inc., 463 U.S. 418 (1983)	False Claims Amendments Act of 1986, Pub.L.No. 99-562, § 6, 100 Stat. 3153, 3159–68
United States v. Baggot, 463 U.S. 476 (1983)	False Claims Amendments Act of 1986, Pub.L.No. 99-562, § 6, 100 Stat. 3153, 3159–68
McNally v. United States, 483 U.S. 350 (1987)	Anti-Drug Abuse Act of 1988, Pub. L. No. 100-690, § 7603(a), 102 Stat. 4181, 4508 (codified at 18 U.S.C. § 1346)
Ratzlaf v. United States, 510 U.S. 135 (1994)	Riegle Community Development and Regulation Improvement Act of 1994, Pub. L. No. 103-325, § 411, 108 Stat. 2160, 2253 (codified at 18 U.S.C. § 5323).
Bailey v. United States, 516 U.S. 137 (1995)	Act of Nov. 3, 1998, Pub. L. No. 105-386, 112 Stat. 3469 (codified at 18 U.S.C. § 924(c))
United States v. Santos, 553 U.S. 507 (2008)	Fraud Enforcement and Recovery Act of 2009, Pub. L. No. 111-21, § 2(f)(1), 123 Stat. 1617, 1618 (codified at 18 U.S.C. § 1956)

=== Disability ===
Abrogated decision	Abrogating statute
Toyota Motor Manufacturing, Kentucky, Inc. v. Williams, 534 U.S. 184 (2002)	ADA Amendments Act of 2008, Pub. L. No. 110-325, 122 Stat. 3553, 3559 (2008)

=== Education ===
Abrogated decision	Abrogating statute
Grove City College v. Bell, 465 U.S. 555 (1984)	Civil Rights Restoration Act of 1987, Pub. L. No. 100-259, 102 Stat. 28 (1988)
Traynor v. Turnage, 485 U.S. 535 (1988)	Veterans' Benefits Improvement Act of 1988, Pub. L. No. 100-687, tit. II & III, 102 Stat. 4105, 4109–22
Dellmuth v. Muth, 491 U.S. 223 (1989)	Education of the Handicapped Act Amendments of 1990, Pub. L. No. 101-476, § 103, 104 Stat. 1103, 1106

=== Environment ===
Abrogated decision	Abrogating statute
Secretary of the Interior v. California, 464 U.S. 312 (1984)	Omnibus Budget Reconciliation Act of 1990, Pub. L. No. 101-508, § 6208, 104 Stat. 1388 , 1388-307–08
Chemical Manufacturers Ass'n v. Natural Resources Defense Council, Inc., 470 U.S. 116 (1985)	Water Quality Act, Pub. L. No. 100-4, § 306, 101 Stat. 7, 35–36 (1987)
Gwaltney of Smithfield, Ltd. v. Chesapeake Bay Foundation, Inc., 484 U.S. 49 (1987)	Clean Air Act Amendments of 1990, Pub. L. No. 101-549, § 707(g), 104 Stat. 2399, 2683

=== Federal courts ===
Absolute and qualified immunity

Abrogated decision	Abrogating statute
Pulliam v. Allen, 466 U.S. 522 (1984)	Federal Courts Improvement Act of 1996, Pub. L. No. 104-317, 110 Stat. 3847

Anti-Injunction Act

Abrogated decision	Abrogating statute
Toucey v. New York Life Insurance Co., 314 U.S. 118 (1941)	Act of June 25, 1948, ch. 646, 62 Stat. 968 (codified at 28 U.S.C. § 2283)

Magistrates

Abrogated decision	Abrogating statute
Wingo v. Wedding, 418 U.S. 461 (1974)	28 U.S.C. § 636(b)

Private right of action

Abrogated decision	Abrogating statute
Suter v. Artist M., 503 U.S. 347 (1992)	42 U.S.C. § 1320a-2

Subject-matter jurisdiction

Abrogated decision	Abrogating statute
Pacific Railroad Removal Cases, 115 U.S. 1 (1885)	28 U.S.C. § 1349
Coit Independence Joint Venture v. FSLIC, 489 U.S. 561 (1989)	Financial Institutions Reform, Recovery, and Enforcement Act of 1989, Pub. L. No. 101-73, § 212(a), 103 Stat. 183, 225–30
Finely v. United States, 490 U.S. 545 (1989)	Judicial Improvements Act of 1990 (codified at 28 U.S.C. § 1367)
International Primate Protection League v. Administrators of Tulane Educational Fund, 500 U.S. 72 (1991)	Federal Courts Improvement Act of 1996, Pub. L. No. 104-317, § 206, 110 Stat. 3847 (codified at 28 U.S.C. § 1442(a)(1))

=== Habeas ===
Abrogated decision	Abrogating statute
Barry v. Mercein, 46 U.S. (5 How.) 103 (1847)	Act of Feb. 5, 1867, ch. 28, 14 Stat. 385, 386
INS v. St. Cyr, 533 U.S. 289 (2001)	Real ID Act of 2005

=== Immigration ===
Abrogated decision	Abrogating statute
Wong Yang Sung v. McGrath, 339 U.S. 33 (1950)	Supplemental Appropriation Act of 1951. 64 Stat. 1044, 1048
Boutilier v. INS, 387 U.S. 118 (1967)	Immigration Act of 1990, Pub. L. No. 101-649, § 601, 104 Stat. 4978, 5067
De Canas v. Bica, 424 U.S. 351 (1976)	Immigration Reform and Control Act of 1986, Pub. L. No. 99-603, sec. 101, § 274A(h)(2), 100 Stat. 3359, 3368
INS v. Phinpathya, 464 U.S. 183 (1984)	Immigration Reform and Control Act of 1986, Pub. L. No. 99-603, § 315(b), 100 Stat. 3359, 3439–40 (1986)

=== Labor ===
Abrogated decision	Abrogating statute
In re Debs, 158 U.S. 564 (1895); Adair v. United States, 208 U.S. 161 (1908); Coppage v. Kansas, 236 U.S. 1 (1915)	Norris–La Guardia Act of 1932, Pub. L. No. 72-65, ch. 90, 47 Stat. 70 (29 U.S.C. 101 et seq.).
Anderson v. Mt. Clemens Pottery Co., 328 U.S. 680 (1946)	Portal-to-Portal Act of 1947, 61 Stat. 84, 84–90 (codified at 29 U.S.C. §§ 251–262)
General Electric Co. v. Gilbert, 429 U.S. 125 (1976)	Pregnancy Discrimination Act, 42 U.S.C. § 2000e(k)
Johnson v. Mayor & City Council of Baltimore, 472 U.S. 353 (1985)	Age Discrimination in Employment Amendments of 1986, Pub. L. No. 99-592, 100 Stat. 3342
United States v. Fausto, 484 U.S. 439 (1988)	Civil Service Due Process Amendments, Pub. L. No. 101-376, 104 Stat. 461 (1990)
Public Employees Retirement System of Ohio v. Betts, 492 U.S. 158 (1989)	Older Workers Benefit Protection Act, Pub. L. No. 101-433, 104 Stat. 978 (1990)
EEOC v. Arabian American Oil Co., 499 U.S. 244 (1991)	Civil Rights Act of 1991, Pub. Law. No. 102–166, sec. 109, 105 Stat. 1071
Ledbetter v. Goodyear Tire & Rubber Co., 550 U.S. 618 (2007)	Lilly Ledbetter Fair Pay Act of 2009, Pub. L. No. 111-2, 123 Stat. 5

=== Native Americans ===
Abrogated decision	Abrogating statute
California v. Cabazon Band of Mission Indians, 480 U.S. 202 (1987)	Indian Gaming Regulatory Act, Pub. L. No. 100-497, 102 Stat. 2467 (1988)

=== Patent ===
Abrogated decision	Abrogating statute
Tyler v. Tuel, 10 U.S. 324 (1810)	Patent Act of 1836, 5 Stat. 117 (1836)
United States v. Morton Salt, 338 U.S. 632 (1950)	Patent & Trademark Office Authorization, Pub. L. No. 100-703, § 201, 102 Stat. 4674, 4676 (1988)
Deepsouth Packing Co. v. Laitram Corp., 406 U.S. 518 (1972)	Inventions in Outer Space, Pub. L. No. 101-580, 104 Stat. 2863 (1990)

=== Quiet title ===
Abrogated decision	Abrogating statute
Block v. North Dakota, 461 U.S. 273 (1983)	Quiet Title Actions, Pub. L. No. 99-598, 100 Stat. 3351 (1986)

=== Securities fraud ===
Abrogated decision	Abrogating statute
Morrison v. National Australia Bank Ltd, 130 S. Ct. 2869 (2010)	Dodd–Frank Wall Street Reform and Consumer Protection Act, Pub. L. No. 111-203, sec. 292P(b)(2), § 27(b), 124 Stat. 1376, 1862

=== Tax ===
Abrogated decision	Abrogating statute
Cary v. Curtis, 44 U.S. (3 How.) 236 (1845)	Act of Feb. 26, 1845, 5 Stat. 727
General Utilities & Operating Co. v. Helvering, 296 U.S. 200 (1935)	Tax Reform Act of 1986, Pub. L. No. 99-514, § 631, 100 Stat. 2085, 2269–75

=== Veterans ===
Abrogated decision	Abrogating statute
Rose v. Rose Establishment Precedent, 481 U.S. 619 (1987)	Department of Veterans Affairs Act of 1988, Pub. L. No. 102-83
Rose v. Rose Enforcement Precedent, 481 U.S. 619 (1987)	Amendment to the Social Security Act 1997, Pub. L. No. 104-193

=== Voting ===
Abrogated decision	Abrogating statute
Lassiter v. Northampton County Board of Elections, 360 U.S. 45 (1959)	Voting Rights Act of 1965, Pub. L. No. 89-110, 79 Stat. 437

== Attempted abrogations ==
Decision attempted to be abrogated	Statute attempting to abrogate	Decision invalidating abrogation
United States v. Padelford, 76 U.S. (9 Wall.) 531 (1869)	92 Stat. 2076	United States v. Klein, 80 U.S. (13 Wall.) 128 (1872)
Lampf, Pleva, Lipkind & Petigrow v. Gilbertson, 501 U.S. 350 (1991)	Federal Deposit Insurance Corporation Improvement Act of 1991, sec. 476, 105 Stat. 2236 (15 U.S.C. 78aa-1)	Plaut v. Spendthrift Farm, Inc., 514 U.S. 211 (1995)
Employment Division v. Smith, 494 U.S. 872 (1990)	Religious Freedom Restoration Act of 1993, Pub. L. No. 103-141, 107 Stat. 1488 (42 U.S.C. 2000bb et seq.)	City of Boerne v. Flores, 521 U.S. 507 (1997)
Miranda v. Arizona, 384 U.S. 436 (1966)	18 U.S.C. 3501	Dickerson v. United States, 530 U.S. 428 (2000)

Mixed results

First decision	Statute	Second decision
Hepburn & Dundas v. Ellzey, 6 U.S. (2 Cranch) 445 (1805)	28 U.S.C.1332(d)	National Mutual Insurance Co. v. Tidewater Transfer Co., 337 U.S. 582 (1949)
City of Boerne v. Flores, 521 U.S. 507 (1997)	Religious Land Use and Institutionalized Persons Act (42 U.S.C. 2000cc et seq.)	Cutter v. Wilkinson, 544 U.S. 709 (2005)

== See also ==
- List of overruled U.S. Supreme Court decisions
