= McNally v. United States =

- Supreme Court of the United States

Argued April 22, 1987 Decided June 24, 1987
- Full case name: Charles J. McNally and James E. Gray v. United States of America
- Citations: 483 U.S. 350 (more) 107 S. Ct. 2875; 97 L. Ed. 2d 292; 1987 U.S. LEXIS 2878

Case history
- Prior: 790 F.2d 1290 (6th Cir. 1986), cert. granted, 479 U.S. 1005 (1986).

Holding
- The scope of the federal mail fraud statute is limited to the protection of money and property rights, and does not extend to the rights of the citizenry to good government.

Court membership
- Chief Justice William Rehnquist Associate Justices William J. Brennan Jr. · Byron White; Thurgood Marshall · Harry Blackmun; Lewis F. Powell Jr. · John P. Stevens; Sandra Day O'Connor · Antonin Scalia

Case opinions
- Majority: White, joined by Rehnquist, Brennan, Marshall, Blackmun, Powell, Scalia
- Dissent: Stevens, joined by O'Connor (Parts I, II and III)

Laws applied
- 18 U.S.C. § 1341
- Superseded by
- Anti-Drug Abuse Act of 1988 (codified at 18 U.S.C. § 1346)

McNally v. United States, 483 U.S. 350 (1987), was a case in which the United States Supreme Court decided that the federal statute criminalizing mail fraud applied only to the schemes and artifices defrauding victims of money or property, as opposed to those defrauding citizens of their rights to good government. The case was superseded one year later when the United States Congress amended the law to specifically include honest services fraud in the mail and wire fraud statutes.

== Background of case ==
Julian Carroll became Governor of Kentucky in 1974; that same year, Howard P. Hunt became the chairman of the Kentucky Democratic Party. Kentucky purchased workmen's compensation insurance from Wombwell Insurance Agency; Hunt conspired with Robert Tabeling, the vice president of the insurance agency, to award the state's insurance business to Wombwell in exchange for kickbacks being sent to other insurance agencies specified by Hunt. $200,000 in kickbacks made it to Seton Investments, Inc., which was nominally headed by Charles McNally but actually run by Hunt and Carroll's Secretary of Public Protection and Regulation, James E. Gray. McNally received $75,500 for acting as frontman for Seton, while Hunt and Gray used the rest of the money to purchase condominiums in Florida and an automobile, among others.

In 1983, Hunt, McNally, and Gray were indicted by a federal grand jury on charges of mail fraud for defrauding the citizens of Kentucky of "their right to have the Commonwealth's business and its affairs conducted honestly, impartially, free from corruption, bias, dishonesty, deceit, official misconduct, and fraud", and of "money and other things of value", using the United States mail. Hunt pleaded guilty to mail and tax fraud, and he was sentenced to three years in prison. Six of the eight charges against the defendants were dismissed before the trial, but they were convicted by a jury on the remaining two counts of conspiracy and fraud.

=== Appeal ===
McNally and Gray appealed to the United States Court of Appeals for the Sixth Circuit, arguing that Hunt's fraud, which they had been convicted of abetting, was not honest services fraud because he had no fiduciary duty to the people of Kentucky. The Sixth Circuit, noting Gray's fiduciary duty to the people of Kentucky as Secretary of Public Protection and Regulation, concluded that Hunt also had a fiduciary duty to the people of Kentucky as a de facto public official due to his substantial participation in governmental affairs and "de facto control" of the awarding of the insurance contract to Wombwell.

The appellants also argued that their rights to due process of law were violated by the indictment, contending that it failed to allege that Hunt and Gray had a fiduciary duty to the citizens of Kentucky, a fact of which they necessarily had to be informed in order to understand the elements of the charges against them. The Sixth Circuit rejected this argument as well, stating that the indictment contained sufficient information for the defendants to be apprised of the charges, including the identification of the roles Hunt and Gray played in the conspiracy to defraud.

The Sixth Circuit affirmed the convictions on May 12, 1986. The Supreme Court of the United States granted certiorari and reversed the decision of the lower court; the case was argued before the Court on April 22, 1987, and decided on June 24 of that year.

== Decision ==
=== Majority ===
Justice White wrote the opinion of the Court, holding that the federal mail fraud statute only protected money and property, not the public's intangible right to honest government:

Rather than construe the statute in a manner that leaves its outer boundaries ambiguous and involves the Federal Government in setting standards of disclosure and good government for local and state officials, we read 1341 as limited in scope to the protection of property rights. If Congress desires to go further, it must speak more clearly than it has.

The law, passed in 1872 during a postal law recodification, originally only criminalized "any scheme or artifice to defraud." In March 1909, Congress added another clause, reading "or for obtaining money or property by means of false or fraudulent pretenses, representations, or promises." In McNally, the Court therefore concluded that Congress intended the mail fraud statute's scope to be limited to protecting money and property, citing its ruling in United States v. Universal C. I. T. Credit Corp., which stated that "when choice has to be made between two readings of what conduct Congress has made a crime, it is appropriate, before we choose the harsher alternative, to require that Congress should have spoken in language that is clear and definite. We should not derive criminal outlawry from some ambiguous implication."

The convictions of McNally and Gray were thus reversed.

=== Dissent ===
Justice Stevens wrote the dissenting opinion, arguing that "nothing in the words 'any scheme or artifice to defraud,' or in the purpose of the statute, justifies limiting its application to schemes intended to deprive victims of money or property."

== See also ==
- List of abrogated U.S. Supreme Court decisions
- List of United States Supreme Court cases, volume 483
- List of United States Supreme Court cases
- Lists of United States Supreme Court cases by volume
- List of United States Supreme Court cases by the Rehnquist Court
- Skilling v. United States
