= Mitchell v. Helms =

- Supreme Court of the United States

Argued December 1, 1999 Decided June 28, 2000
- Full case name: Guy Mitchell, et al. v. Mary L. Helms, et al.
- Citations: 530 U.S. 793 (more) 120 S. Ct. 2530; 147 L. Ed. 2d 660; 2000 U.S. LEXIS 4485; 68 U.S.L.W. 4668; 2000 Cal. Daily Op. Service 5227; 2000 Daily Journal DAR 7105; 2000 Colo. J. C.A.R. 4012; 13 Fla. L. Weekly Fed. S 562

Holding
- Loans made to religious schools under Chapter 2 of the Education Consolidation and Improvement Act of 1981 are constitutional.

Court membership
- Chief Justice William Rehnquist Associate Justices John P. Stevens · Sandra Day O'Connor; Antonin Scalia · Anthony Kennedy; David Souter · Clarence Thomas; Ruth Bader Ginsburg · Stephen Breyer

Case opinions
- Plurality: Thomas, joined by Rehnquist, Scalia, Kennedy
- Concurrence: O'Connor (in judgment), joined by Breyer
- Dissent: Souter, joined by Stevens, Ginsburg

Laws applied
- U.S. Const. amend. I
- This case overturned a previous ruling or rulings
- Meek v. Pittenger (1975); Wolman v. Walter (1977)

Mitchell v. Helms, 530 U.S. 793 (2000), is a United States Supreme Court case in which the Court ruled that it was permissible for states to make loans to religious schools under Chapter 2 of the Education Consolidation and Improvement Act of 1981.

== Background ==
Chapter 2 of the Education Consolidation and Improvement Act of 1981 gave federal funds via state educational agencies to local educational agencies. In turn, educational materials and equipment were lent to public and private elementary and secondary schools to implement "secular, neutral, and non ideological" programs.

In an average year, about 30% of Chapter 2 funds spent in Jefferson Parish, Louisiana, were distributed to Catholic or religious private schools. Taxpayers sued, arguing that this violated the First Amendment's Establishment Clause.

Lee Boothby, representing parents who opposed the aid program in Louisiana, said the issue at stake was "our historic commitment that taxpayers not be required to subsidize religious schools".

== Opinion of the Court ==
By a 6-3 vote, the Court found that the program was constitutional, and aid could be provided to religious schools. There was no majority opinion, only a plurality of four with two justices concurring in part.

Mary Helms and other public school parents filed suit alleging that Chapter 2, as applied in Jefferson Parish, violated the First Amendment's Establishment Clause. The District Court initially agreed, finding that Chapter 2 had the primary effect of advancing religion because the materials and equipment loaned to the Catholic schools were direct aid and that the schools were pervasively sectarian. But after the presiding judge who made the initial ruling retired, the case was reviewed by a new judge, who reversed that decision. Thereafter, based on different precedent, the court upheld Chapter 2. In reversing, the Court of Appeals held Chapter 2 unconstitutional.

The Court used the two relevant criteria of the Lemon test to make a ruling:

1. Does the program have a secular purpose?
2. Does the program have a primary effect of advancing or inhibiting religion?
3. Does the program create an excessive entanglement between government and religion?

The Lemon test's third criterion was held in Agostini v. Felton not to be relevant when considering distributing aid to religious schools. The Court ruled that the loans were acceptable because they did not represent a governmental indoctrination or advancement of religion. The loans were made in a nondiscriminatory and constitutional fashion to both secular and non-secular schools.

Whether governmental aid to religious schools results in religious indoctrination ultimately depends on whether any indoctrination that occurs could reasonably be attributed to governmental action.

— Justice Thomas

Since the loans were suitable for both religious and public schools, the government was not serving to advance religion.

This decision expressly overruled Meek v. Pittenger (1975) and Wolman v. Walter (1977), as those decisions conflicted with its chosen analysis in this case. Both of those cases invalidated aid in the form of instructional materials to sectarian schools.

Accordingly, the government could provide aid to religious groups as long as such aid advanced a legitimate non-religious purpose and was granted in the same manner to non-religious groups.

== See also ==
- Lemon v. Kurtzman (1971)
