= Mail and wire fraud =

Federal crimes using the post or telegraphy

Mail fraud and wire fraud are terms used in the United States to describe the use of a physical (e.g., the U.S. Postal Service) or electronic (e.g., a phone, a telegram, a fax, or the Internet) mail system to defraud another, and are U.S. federal crimes. Jurisdiction is claimed by the federal government if the illegal activity crosses interstate or international borders.

== Mail fraud ==
Mail fraud was first defined in the United States in 1872.

18 U.S.C. § 1341 provides:

Whoever, having devised or intending to devise any scheme or artifice to defraud, or for obtaining money or property by means of false or fraudulent pretenses, representations, or promises, or to sell, dispose of, loan, exchange, alter, give away, distribute, supply, or furnish or procure for unlawful use any counterfeit or spurious coin, obligation, security, or other article, or anything represented to be or intimated or held out to be such counterfeit or spurious article, for the purpose of executing such scheme or artifice or attempting so to do, places in any post office or authorized depository for mail matter, any matter or thing to be sent or delivered by the Postal Service, or deposits or causes to be deposited any matter or thing to be sent or delivered by any private or commercial interstate carrier, or takes or receives therefrom, any such matter or thing, or knowingly causes to be delivered by mail or such carrier according to the direction thereon, or at the place at which it is directed to be delivered by the person to whom it is addressed, any such matter or thing, shall be fined under this title or imprisoned not more than 20 years, or both. If the violation occurs in relation to, or involving any benefit authorized, transported, transmitted, transferred, disbursed, or paid in connection with, a Presidential declared major disaster or emergency (as those terms are defined in section 102 of the Robert T. Stafford Disaster Relief and Emergency Assistance Act (42 U.S.C. 5122)), or affects a financial institution, such person shall be fined not more than $1,000,000 or imprisoned not more than 30 years, or both.

Thus, anyone trying to defraud another individual or group through items of value, e.g., money, through the US mail system or a private mail delivery service and those knowingly participating in that fraud will be punished with a fine and/or prison sentence that cannot be longer than 20 years. However, for such acts during a Presidential declared major disaster or emergency, the prison sentence can be as long as 30 years and the fine as great as $1,000,000.

In mail fraud, US federal jurisdiction is based on the enumerated power to create a post office under Article I, Section 8 of the US Constitution.

International reply coupons mailed by participants of Charles Ponzi's scheme are a 20th-century example of mail fraud. Ponzi was charged with the U.S. federal crime of mail fraud.

== Wire fraud ==
Wire fraud is a federal crime in the United States involving the use of electronic communications to perpetrate a scheme to defraud. First codified in 1952, the statute was enacted to extend the reach of the older mail fraud statute to cover fraud conducted via telephone, radio, television, and later the internet.

18 U.S.C. § 1343 provides:

Whoever, having devised or intending to devise any scheme or artifice to defraud, or for obtaining money or property by means of false or fraudulent pretenses, representations, or promises, transmits or causes to be transmitted by means of wire, radio, or television communication in interstate or foreign commerce, any writings, signs, signals, pictures, or sounds for the purpose of executing such scheme or artifice, shall be fined under this title or imprisoned not more than 20 years, or both. If the violation occurs in relation to, or involving any benefit authorized, transported, transmitted, transferred, disbursed, or paid in connection with, a presidentially declared major disaster or emergency (as those terms are defined in section 102 of the Robert T. Stafford Disaster Relief and Emergency Assistance Act (42 U.S.C. § 5122)), or affects a financial institution, such person shall be fined not more than $1,000,000 or imprisoned not more than 30 years, or both.

=== Elements ===
Federal courts have identified the essential elements of wire fraud as: (1) voluntary and intentional participation in a scheme to defraud; (2) intent to defraud; (3) reasonable foreseeability that interstate wire communications would be used; and (4) actual use of interstate wire communications in furtherance of the scheme. The Supreme Court of the United States held in Neder v. United States (1999) that materiality of the misrepresentation is a required element.

=== Scope and judicial interpretation ===
The scope of the wire fraud statute is broad, with the Supreme Court holding it encompasses "everything designed to defraud by representations as to the past or present, or suggestions and promises as to the future." In 1987, the Supreme Court narrowed the statute's scope in McNally v. United States, holding that the mail fraud statute "is limited in scope to the protection of property rights" and does not reach "schemes to defraud citizens of their intangible rights to honest and impartial government." Congress responded in 1988 by enacting 18 U.S.C. § 1346, which provides that the term "scheme or artifice to defraud" includes schemes to deprive another of "the intangible right of honest services."

In Ciminelli v. United States (2023), the Supreme Court unanimously rejected the "right-to-control" theory of property-based wire fraud, holding that the statute is limited to schemes targeting "traditional property interests" and does not extend to an entity's intangible right to control its assets. However, in Kousisis v. United States (2025), the Court upheld the "fraudulent inducement" theory, ruling that a defendant may be convicted of wire fraud for inducing a victim to enter a transaction under materially false pretenses, even if the defendant did not intend to cause economic loss.

=== Prosecution statistics ===
Wire fraud has become one of the most commonly charged federal crimes. Prosecutions reached record levels in fiscal year 2023, with approximately 88 percent of cases resulting in conviction. Conspiracy to commit wire fraud (18 U.S.C. § 1349), added to federal law in 2002, is frequently charged alongside substantive wire fraud counts.

=== Federal sentencing guidelines ===
Wire fraud is sentenced under USSG §2B1.1, which governs fraud and theft offenses. The base offense level is 7, with significant enhancements based on the amount of loss, number of victims, use of sophisticated means, and targeting of vulnerable victims. Under an amendment effective November 1, 2026, loss amounts exceeding $350,000 add 12 levels; amounts exceeding $90,000,000 add 24 levels. The maximum statutory penalty is 20 years imprisonment, increasing to 30 years if the offense affects a financial institution.

=== Notable cases ===
Wire fraud charges have been central to some of the largest financial fraud prosecutions in American history:

- Adelphia (2004): Founder and CEO John Rigas and CFO Timothy Rigas were convicted of conspiracy, bank fraud, wire fraud, and securities fraud for concealing $2.3 billion in debt and looting the cable company for personal use. John Rigas received 15 years; Timothy received 20 years. The SEC described it as "one of the most extensive financial frauds ever to take place at a public company."
- Allen Stanford (2012): Convicted of wire fraud and other charges for running a $7.2 billion Ponzi scheme through his Antigua-based Stanford International Bank. Sentenced to 110 years in prison.
- Bernie Madoff (2009): Pleaded guilty to 11 federal felonies, including wire fraud and mail fraud, for operating the largest Ponzi scheme in history, estimated at $65 billion. Sentenced to 150 years in prison.
- Elizabeth Holmes (2022): Founder of Theranos, convicted of three counts of wire fraud and one count of conspiracy to commit wire fraud for misleading investors about the capabilities of the company's blood-testing technology. Sentenced to 11 years in prison.
- Enron (2006): CEO Kenneth Lay was convicted of conspiracy, securities fraud, and wire fraud; former CEO Jeffrey Skilling was convicted on 19 counts including conspiracy, securities fraud, wire fraud, and insider trading. The energy company's collapse, caused by executives hiding billions in debt through fraudulent accounting, resulted in $74 billion in shareholder losses and 22 total convictions. The FBI described it as its "largest white-collar crime investigation."
- National Prearranged Services (2013): Six defendants, including Brent Cassity and his father Doug Cassity, pleaded guilty to charges including wire fraud, mail fraud, and money laundering in what the FBI described as "the largest corporate fraud case prosecuted in the Eastern District of Missouri." The preneed funeral insurance scheme defrauded 97,000 consumers of more than $450 million.
- Sam Bankman-Fried (2023): Founder of cryptocurrency exchange FTX, convicted of two counts of wire fraud and two counts of conspiracy to commit wire fraud for misappropriating over $10 billion in customer funds. Sentenced to 25 years in prison.
- WorldCom (2005): CEO Bernard Ebbers was convicted of conspiracy, securities fraud, and filing false documents with regulators for overseeing an $11 billion accounting fraud—the largest in American history at that time. Sentenced to 25 years in prison. CFO Scott Sullivan received 5 years after cooperating with prosecutors. The scandal caused over $180 billion in investor losses.

== Honest services ==
18 U.S.C. § 1346 provides:

For the purposes of this chapter, the term "scheme or artifice to defraud" includes a scheme or artifice to deprive another of the intangible right of honest services.

== Elements ==
There are three elements to mail and wire fraud: mail or wire communication, a scheme and intent to defraud someone, and a material deception.

Mail fraud applies only to United States domestic mailings and use of interstate carriers (UPS, FedEx) which must originate in one state, and successfully terminate pursuant to the address label inside another state. The transportation must, therefore, be "interstate" (over which Congress has power to regulate), which requires that the mailing cross at least one state line into another state. Wire fraud has been expanded by Congress to include foreign wire communication or interstate connections via (e.g.) an e-mail server or telephone switch or radio communication.

== Case law ==
In McNally v. United States (1987), the Supreme Court held that 18 U.S.C. §§ 1341 and 1343 did not reach honest services fraud. Congress responded by passing 18 U.S.C. § 1346. In Skilling v. United States (2010), the Court construed § 1346 to apply only to bribes and kickbacks.

United States v. Regent Office Supply Co. (1970) involves Regent which was a company that sold orders over a telephone. Regent representatives would exaggerate their office products over the phone. The United States government charged the company with wire fraud. The company's salesmen were accused of making "false pretenses" over the phone. The United States Court of Appeals for the Second Circuit ruled that the "repugnant" conduct of the company did not amount to criminality.

Lustiger v. United States, 386 F.2d 132 (9th Cir., 1967), involved a real estate advertisement mail fraud. The defendant stated that as a salesman he had engaged in puffery.

In United States v. Takhalov (2016), female nightclub employees would pose as tourists, engage with potential customers, and lure them into nightclubs owned by Takhalov. The employees would express romantic interest in the customers and not reveal that they were club employees. The 11th Circuit ruled that Takhalov deceived their customers, but this deception didn't amount to defrauding the customers under the Wire Fraud statute.

== Mail fraud schemes ==
There are many types of mail fraud schemes, including employment fraud, financial fraud, fraud against older Americans, sweepstakes and lottery fraud, and telemarketing fraud. Additional information about these various types of mail fraud schemes can be found on the United States Postal Inspection Service website.

In the 1960s and 1970s, Chief Postal Inspector Martin McGee, also known as "The Top Sleuth" or "Mr. Mail Fraud", led his department in exposing and prosecuting numerous mail fraud swindles such as land sales, phony advertising practices, insurance rip-offs, and fraudulent charitable organizations that used the mail to facilitate their illegal activities.

== Scope ==
The scope of 18 U.S.C. §1341 and 18 U.S.C. §1343 is broad. These statutes have been held by the Supreme Court to encompass "everything designed to defraud by representations as to the past or present, or suggestions and promises as to the future." Lower courts have progressively expanded this ruling, finding that the law "puts its imprimatur on the accepted moral standards and condemns conduct which fails to match the 'reflection of moral uprightness, of fundamental honesty, fair play and right dealing in the general and business life of members of society'". As interpreted, these requirements are not difficult to meet; the Justice Department claims to defer federal prosecution for petty local fraud.

In 1987, the Supreme Court of the United States ruled in McNally v. United States to narrow the scope of the mail and wire fraud statutes, ruling that the statute pertained only to schemes to defraud victims of tangible property, including money. In 1988, Congress enacted a new law that specifically criminalized schemes to defraud victims of "the intangible right of honest services" (honest services fraud).

== See also ==
- China Medical Technologies
- Email authentication
- List of confidence tricks
- Making false statements
- USA PATRIOT Act
- Ponzi scheme
- Sholam Weiss
- Taylor, Bean & Whitaker, top-10 U.S. wholesale mortgage lending firm that ceased business following multibillion-dollar fraud revelations
- Travel Act
