= Colorado Republican Federal Campaign Committee v. FEC =

- Supreme Court of the United States

Argued April 15, 1996 Decided June 26, 1996
- Full case name: Colorado Republican Federal Campaign Committee v. Federal Election Commission
- Citations: 518 U.S. 604 (more) 109 S. Ct. 2533; 105 L. Ed. 2d 342; 1989 U.S. LEXIS 3115; 57 U.S.L.W. 4770
- Argument: Oral argument

Case history
- Prior: Summary judgment granted in favor of defendants, FEC v. Colorado Republican Fed. Campaign Comm., 839 F. Supp. 1448 (D. Colo. 1993), reversed, 59 F.3d 1015 (10th Cir. 1995), cert. granted, 516 U.S. 1036 (1996).
- Subsequent: Remanded, 96 F.3d 471 (10th Cir. 1996).

Holding
- Independent expenditures by political parties made without coordination of a candidate are protected by the First Amendment

Court membership
- Chief Justice William Rehnquist Associate Justices John P. Stevens · Sandra Day O'Connor; Antonin Scalia · Anthony Kennedy; David Souter · Clarence Thomas; Ruth Bader Ginsburg · Stephen Breyer

Case opinions
- Plurality: Breyer, joined by O'Connor, Souter
- Concurrence: Kennedy, joined by Rehnquist, Scalia
- Concurrence: Thomas, joined by Rehnquist, Scalia (as to Parts I and III)
- Dissent: Stevens, joined by Ginsburg

Laws applied
- U.S. Const. amend. I;2 U.S.C. §441a(d)

Colorado Republican Federal Campaign Committee v. FEC, 518 U.S. 604 (1996), was a Supreme Court of the United States case in which the Colorado Republican Party challenged the Federal Election Commission (FEC) as to whether the "Party Expenditure Provision" of the Federal Election Campaign Act of 1971 (FECA) violated the First Amendment right to free speech. This provision put a limit on the amount of money a national party could spend on a congressional candidate's campaign. The FEC argued that the Committee violated this provision when purchasing a radio advertisement that attacked the likely candidate of the Colorado Democratic Party. The court held that since the committee's expenditures were made independently from a specific candidate, they did not violate FECA's campaign contribution limitations and were protected under the First Amendment.

== Background of the case ==
Prior to selecting a candidate for the 1986 senatorial election, the Colorado Republican Federal Campaign Committee purchased radio advertisements attacking Timothy Wirth, the Democratic Party's likely candidate. In response to this, the FEC filed suit against the committee, alleging that the radio advertisements they had purchased violated "Party Expenditure Provision" of the Federal Election Campaign Act of 1971 (FECA), which set a limit on how much money a political party could spend on a campaign for a congressional candidate.

The Committee defended themselves by arguing that since the advertisement had not endorsed or advocated for a specific candidate, it was not in violation of the provision. The committee also filed a counterclaim challenging the Party Expenditure Provision as a whole, with the claim that the provision violated the First Amendment as it applied to advertisements.

The U.S. District Court for the District of Colorado held that the party's expenditure for the radio advertisement did not violate the Party Expenditure Provision because it did not advocate for a specific candidate, as restricted under the provision. The decision was appealed to the U.S. Court of Appeals for the Tenth Circuit, and the ruling of the district court was reversed. The Tenth Circuit held that while the radio ad has not advocated for a specific candidate, the expenditure was still coordinated with the campaign, and thus in violation of FECA. In the court's view, the limits imposed on party expenditures served as justifiable infringements of the First Amendment rights of party committees in an effort to preserve the integrity of elections. The case was then taken to the Supreme Court.

In a prior case with similar facts, Buckley v. Valeo, the Supreme Court found that FECA's limitations on contributions to an election campaign were generally constitutional, but limitations on election expenditures were not. In this case, the Court held that limitations on election expenditures violated the First Amendment by infringing on the right to political expression. Buckley v. Valeo was used as precedent for the Supreme Court's decision when determining the constitutionality of 2 U.S.C. § 441a(d)(3) as applied to a Party's independent campaign expenditure in the case of Colorado Republican Federal Campaign Committee v. FEC.

== The Supreme Court's decision ==
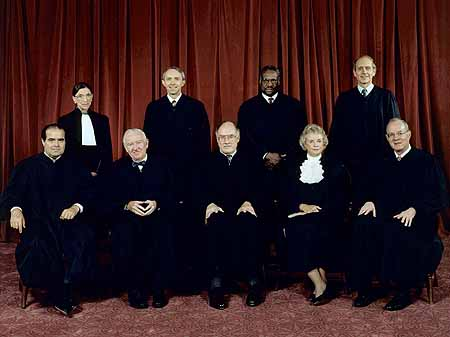
The Rehnquist Court (1998)

In a 7–2 plurality decision announced by Justice Stephen G. Breyer, the United States Supreme Court held that independent expenditures by political parties made without coordination of a candidate are protected by the First Amendment.

The court also ruled that the advertisement paid for by the Colorado Republican Federal Campaign Committee was an independent expenditure, as it did not advocate for any candidate in particular. As an independent expenditure, the advertisement was found to be not in violation of the Party Expenditure Provision of the Federal Election Campaign Act. Because of this, the Court did not address the constitutionality of the provision as a whole.

Both Justices Kennedy and Thomas wrote opinions that were in concurrence with Justice Breyer, and Justice Stevens dissented.

=== Breyer's plurality opinion ===
Justice Stephen Breyer wrote an opinion that was joined by Justices O'Connor and Souter. Based on precedent set by Buckley v. Valeo, Breyer believed that some restrictions on expenditures by political parties were constitutional. Even so, he found that the Party Expenditure Provision of the FECA did not apply to an independent expenditure made by a political party without coordination with a candidate. This meant that the independent advertisement paid for by the Colorado Republican Party was not in violation of the Party Expenditure Provision, and was protected by the First Amendment.

We therefore believe that this Court's prior case law controls the outcome here. We do not see how a Constitution that grants to individuals, candidates, and ordinary political committees the right to make unlimited independent expenditures could deny the same right to political parties.

=== Kennedy's concurrence ===
Justice Anthony Kennedy wrote an opinion in concurrence with Breyer, and was joined by Justices Rehnquist and Scalia. Kennedy argued that the FEC could not set a limit on coordinated expenditures by political parties, because such limitations violate parties' right to engage in political speech as protected by the First Amendment. Based on this belief he argued that the Party Expenditure Provision of FECA should be struck down in its entirety as unconstitutional.

=== Thomas' concurrence ===
Justice Clarence Thomas wrote a concurring opinion, that was also joined by Justices Rehnquist and Scalia. Like Kennedy, Thomas also found that the limitations imposed by FECA were unconstitutional. He explained that there are no constitutional differences between expenditures and contributions, and that due to the First Amendment right to engage in political speech, these expenditures could not be limited. Thomas also wrote that by not addressing the validity of the provision, the Court would "inhibit the exercise of legitimate First Amendment activity nationwide."

=== Steven's dissent ===
Justice John P. Stevens wrote an opinion that dissented with the rest of the justices, and was joined by Justice Ginsburg. Stevens concluded that political party expenditures should always be viewed as coordinated with that party's candidates, as the party exists with the purpose to help their candidates get elected. Stevens' dissent gave three interest of the Government that he felt provided "constitutional predicate" for the limitation a party's expenditures. First, he felt that such limits serve the interest in avoiding both the appearance and the reality of a corrupt political process. Second, these restrictions supplement other spending limitations embodied in the Federal Election Campaign Act of 1971, which are likewise designed to prevent corruption. And, third, the Government has an important interest in leveling the electoral playing field by constraining the cost of federal campaigns.

== Remand ==
After the decision by the Supreme Court, the committee's broader claim remained that limitations on congressional campaign expenditures by parties are facially unconstitutional and therefore unenforceable, even when the expenditures are made in coordination with a candidate. The case was remanded to the lower courts and the District Court ruled in favor the committee. The decision was appealed, and the Court of Appeals affirmed the decision.

== 2001 Supreme Court decision (Colorado II) ==
FEC v. Colorado Republican Federal Campaign Committee
- Supreme Court of the United States

Argued February 28, 2001 Decided June 25, 2001
- Full case name: Federal Election Commission v. Colorado Republican Federal Campaign Committee
- Docket no.: 00-191
- Citations: 533 U.S. 431 (more) 121 S.Ct. 2351; 150 L. Ed. 2d 461

Case history
- Prior: 41 F. Supp. 2d 1197 (D. Colo. 1999); affirmed, 213 F.3d 1221 (10th Cir. 2000); cert. granted, 531 U.S. 923 (2000).

Holding
- A political party's coordinated expenditures, unlike expenditures truly independent, may be restricted to minimize circumvention of contribution limits.

Court membership
- Chief Justice William Rehnquist Associate Justices John P. Stevens · Sandra Day O'Connor; Antonin Scalia · Anthony Kennedy; David Souter · Clarence Thomas; Ruth Bader Ginsburg · Stephen Breyer

Case opinions
- Majority: Souter, joined by Stevens, O'Connor, Ginsburg, Breyer
- Dissent: Thomas, joined by Scalia, Kennedy (in full); Rehnquist (as to Part II)
- Overruled by
- National Republican Senatorial Committee v. FEC (2026)

The Supreme Court revisited the case in 2001, with the question "Are congressional campaign expenditure limitations on parties facially unconstitutional and thus unenforceable even as to spending coordinated with a candidate?" In a 5–4 decision given by Justice Souter, the Court found that "a party's coordinated expenditures, unlike expenditures truly independent, may be restricted to minimize circumvention of contribution limits." Justice Souter also wrote "there is little evidence to suggest that coordinated party spending limits adopted by Congress have frustrated the ability of political parties to exercise their First Amendment rights to support their candidates."

== Subsequent developments ==
This case was cited as precedent in the case of Republican Party of Minnesota v. Pauly, where the court ruled that Minn. Stat. § 10A.01, subd. 10b, is unconstitutional to the extent it refuses to allow for "eleventh hour" independent expenditures by political parties. The Pauly Court opined that "The Supreme Court in Buckley and Colorado Republican has imposed upon the Government a significant burden to justify, with solid evidence, the need for particular restrictions on political speech."

It is further cited in 2000 in the case of Wash. State Republican Party v. Public Disclosure Commission, where the Court ruled that advertisements involving issue-oriented political speech is not subject to governmental regulation. Here, the Supreme Court of Washington cited Colorado Republican Federal Campaign Committee v. FEC for the proposition that the government may not limit contributions where there is no risk of corruption. It further cited Colorado Republican for the proposition that "The independent expression of a political party's views is 'core' First Amendment activity no less than is the independent expression of individuals, candidates, or other political committees."

Colorado II was overruled in National Republican Senatorial Committee v. FEC (2026).

== See also ==
- Buckley v. Valeo
