= Agins v. City of Tiburon =

- Supreme Court of the United States

Argued April 15, 1980 Decided June 10, 1980
- Full case name: Donald W. Agins, et ux. v. City of Tiburon
- Citations: 447 U.S. 255 (more) 100 S. Ct. 2138; 65 L. Ed. 2d 106; 1980 U.S. LEXIS 132; 14 ERC (BNA) 1555; 10 ELR 20361

Case history
- Prior: Appeal from the Supreme Court of California

Holding
- The test for determining whether a zoning ordinance or governmental regulation will be considered a taking is whether such action “substantially advances” a legitimate state interest.

Court membership
- Chief Justice Warren E. Burger Associate Justices William J. Brennan Jr. · Potter Stewart; Byron White · Thurgood Marshall; Harry Blackmun · Lewis F. Powell Jr. William Rehnquist · John P. Stevens

Case opinion
- Majority: Powell, joined by unanimous

Laws applied
- U.S. Const. amend. V
- Overruled by
- Lingle v. Chevron U.S.A. Inc. (2005)

Agins v. City of Tiburon, 447 U.S. 255 (1980), was a United States Supreme Court case in which the Court held that the test for determining whether a zoning ordinance or governmental regulation will be considered a taking is whether such action “substantially advances” a legitimate state interest.

The Court subsequently overruled this decision twenty-five years later in Lingle v. Chevron U.S.A. Inc., 554 U.S. 528 (2005).

== Background ==
California state law required the city to prepare a general plan governing both land use and the development of open space land.

After Dr and Ms Agins acquired 5 acres (20,000 m^{2}) of unimproved property zoned one house per acre, the city announced that it intended to acquire it, and issued bonds to finance the taking. It filed an eminent domain action, but on the eve of trial abandoned it. Instead, it amended the zoning ordinance placing the subject land in a zone that permitted construction of one to five homes, the exact number being discretionary with the city. The owners contended that the applying for permit(s) to construct seriatim of one to five home would be economically infeasible and that the city intended to convert their land into open space by preventing its development. They sued seeking just compensation for a regulatory taking.

The owners alleged that their land had greater value than other land in California because of its spectacular views of San Francisco Bay, and the rezoning prevented economically feasible development, thereby completely destroying its value, and thus effecting its taking without just compensation in violation of the Fifth and Fourteenth Amendments.

The California Supreme Court refused to recognize the existence of a regulatory taking cause of action, and held that the only remedy available to the owner would be a petition for a writ of mandate seeking to invalidate the regulation on grounds of denial of substantive due process.

== Court's decision ==
The question in this case was whether the ordinances took Agins' property without just compensation.

The complaint framed the question as to whether a state court's decision to deny compensation for regulatory takings was constitutional, and whether a zoning ordinance that de facto forbade all development of their land effected a taking under the 5th and 14th Amendments. However, as noted, because the owners had not yet applied for a permit for development, the court found that the issue of whether an as-applied taking occurred, was not yet ripe for decision. Therefore, the only issue left was whether this zoning ordinance constituted a taking on its face.

The Court held that a general zoning law can be a taking if the ordinance does not substantially advance a legitimate state interest or denies an owner economically viable use of his land. In spite of its finding of lack of ripeness, the U. S. Supreme Court affirmed the California Supreme Court's holding that the zoning ordinances did not on their face effect an uncompensated taking.
