= Aguilar v. Felton =

- Supreme Court of the United States

Argued December 5, 1984 Decided July 1, 1985
- Full case name: Aguilar, et al. v. Felton, et al.
- Citations: 473 U.S. 402 (more) 105 S. Ct. 3232; 87 L. Ed. 2d 290; 1985 U.S. LEXIS 117

Holding
- Title I of the Elementary and Secondary Education Act of 1965 remedial services could not be provided on the premises of a parochial school because doing so violated the First Amendment's Establishment Clause.

Court membership
- Chief Justice Warren E. Burger Associate Justices William J. Brennan Jr. · Byron White; Thurgood Marshall · Harry Blackmun; Lewis F. Powell Jr. · William Rehnquist; John P. Stevens · Sandra Day O'Connor

Case opinions
- Majority: Brennan, joined by Marshall, Blackmun, Powell, Stevens
- Concurrence: Powell
- Dissent: Burger
- Dissent: White
- Dissent: Rehnquist
- Dissent: O'Connor, joined by Rehnquist (Parts II and III)

Laws applied
- U.S. Const. amend. I
- Overruled by
- Agostini v. Felton (1997)

Aguilar v. Felton, 473 U.S. 402 (1985), was a United States Supreme Court case holding that New York City's program that sent public school teachers into parochial schools to provide remedial education to disadvantaged children pursuant to Title I of the Elementary and Secondary Education Act of 1965 necessitated an excessive entanglement of church and state and violated the Establishment Clause of the First Amendment to the United States Constitution.

Aguilar v. Felton was subsequently overruled by Agostini v. Felton, 521 U.S. 203 (1997).
