= South Carolina v. Gathers =

- Supreme Court of the United States

Argued March 28, 1989 Decided June 12, 1989
- Full case name: Demitrius Gathers v. Tennessee
- Citations: 490 U.S. 805 (more) 109 S. Ct. 2207; 104 L. Ed. 2d 876; 1989 U.S. LEXIS 2817

Case history
- Prior: State v. Gathers, 295 S.C. 476, 369 S.E.2d 140 (1988); cert. granted, 488 U.S. 888 (1988).
- Subsequent: Rehearing denied, 492 U.S. 938 (1989).

Holding
- Victim impact evidence is relevant at the sentencing stage and thus admissible only if it directly relates to the circumstances of the crime. The content of religious cards possessed by the victim cannot equate to such relevance and contributes nothing to the defendant's blameworthiness.

Court membership
- Chief Justice William Rehnquist Associate Justices William J. Brennan Jr. · Byron White; Thurgood Marshall · Harry Blackmun; John P. Stevens · Sandra Day O'Connor; Antonin Scalia · Anthony Kennedy

Case opinions
- Majority: Brennan, joined by White, Marshall, Blackmun, Stevens
- Concurrence: White
- Dissent: O'Connor, joined by Rehnquist, Kennedy
- Dissent: Scalia

Laws applied
- U.S. Const. amends. VIII, XIV
- Overruled by
- Payne v. Tennessee, 501 U.S. 808 (1991)

South Carolina v. Gathers, 490 U.S. 805 (1989), was a United States Supreme Court case which held that testimony in the form of a victim impact statement is admissible during the sentencing phase of a trial only if it directly relates to the "circumstances of the crime." This case was later overruled by the Supreme Court decision in Payne v. Tennessee.

== Decision ==
In a majority opinion by Justice Brennan, the Court held that Booth v. Maryland (1987) left open the possibility that the kind of information contained in victim impact statements could be admissible if it "relate[d] directly to the circumstances of the crime." Though South Carolina asserted that such was the case, the Court disagreed, and held that the content of the cards at issue was irrelevant to the "circumstances of the crime."

Justice O'Connor authored a dissenting opinion, joined by Chief Justice Rehnquist and Justice Kennedy. Justice Scalia also dissented and expressly argued that Booth v. Maryland should be overruled.

== Aftermath ==
The impact of the case was somewhat short-lived, as two years later, the Rehnquist Court decided Payne, which has had a significant impact in victim's rights, criminology, and the lives of the parties involved.

== See also ==
- Crime in the United States
- Criminology
- Crime victim advocacy program
- List of United States Supreme Court cases, volume 490
- List of United States Supreme Court cases
- Lists of United States Supreme Court cases by volume
- List of United States Supreme Court cases by the Rehnquist Court
- Victimology
- Victim Support
- Victim study
