= Lingle v. Chevron U.S.A. Inc. =

- Supreme Court of the United States

Argued February 22, 2005 Decided May 23, 2005
- Full case name: Linda Lingle, Governor of Hawaii, et al. v. Chevron U.S.A. Inc.
- Docket no.: 04-163
- Citations: 544 U.S. 528 (more) 125 S. Ct. 2074; 161 L. Ed. 2d 876; 2005 U.S. LEXIS 4342

Case history
- Prior: Judgment for plaintiffs, 57 F. Supp. 2d 1003 (D. Haw. 1998). Judgment vacated and remanded, 224 F.3d 1030 (9th Cir. 2000). Judgment for plaintiffs, 198 F. Supp. 2d 1182 (D. Haw. 2002). Judgment affirmed, 363 F.3d 846 (9th Cir. 2004).
- Procedural: Writ of Certiorari to the United States Court of Appeals for the Ninth Circuit
- Subsequent: Case remanded to district court for further proceedings, 415 F.3d 1027 (9th Cir. 2005).

Holding
- Contrary to the holding of Agins v. City of Tiburon, the test of whether a governmental regulation substantially advances a legitimate state interest is irrelevant to determining whether the regulation effects an uncompensated taking of private property in violation of the Fifth Amendment.

Court membership
- Chief Justice William Rehnquist Associate Justices John P. Stevens · Sandra Day O'Connor; Antonin Scalia · Anthony Kennedy; David Souter · Clarence Thomas; Ruth Bader Ginsburg · Stephen Breyer

Case opinions
- Majority: O'Connor, joined by unanimous
- Concurrence: Kennedy

Laws applied
- U.S. Const. amend. V
- This case overturned a previous ruling or rulings
- Agins v. City of Tiburon (1980)

Lingle v. Chevron U.S.A. Inc., 544 U.S. 528 (2005), was a landmark case in United States regulatory takings law whereby the Court expressly overruled precedent created in Agins v. City of Tiburon. Agins held that a government regulation of private property effects a taking if such regulation does not substantially advance legitimate state interests. Writing for the Court, Justice O’Connor found the test untenable for a number of reasons, but declined to grant Chevron relief because Chevron’s motion before the court (for grant of summary judgment) was limited to a discussion of the “substantially advances” theory which had just been struck down. The Court remanded to the Ninth Circuit for a determination of whether the statute exacted a taking according to the formula of Penn Central.

== Facts ==
Because of the distance from the continental United States and the logistical difficulties presented by the numerous islands that make up the state of Hawaii, only two oil refineries and six wholesale distributors were doing business in Hawaii, thus creating an oligopoly of gas providers. Chevron, USA was the largest refiner and marketer of gasoline in Hawaii controlling 60% of the market for gasoline produced or refined in-state and 30% of the wholesale market on Oahu, Hawaii’s most populous island.

Half of all of retail service stations in Hawaii are leased from oil companies by independent lessee-dealers, some are owned by the oil companies, and some are owned by dealers who are not affiliated with any specific refinery. Chevron sells most of its products through the independent-lessee program, whereby Chevron charges the lessee a monthly rent (a percentage of the margin on sales) and requires the lessee to enter into an outputs contract, whereby the Chevron supplies the lessee with all gasoline products.

In 1997, in response to concerns about the effects of concentration of retail service stations and the market implications, the Hawaii Legislature enacted Act 257, restricting, among other things, the amount of rent that an oil company can charge their dealer-lessee to 15% of the dealer’s gross profits from sales, plus an additional 15% of gross sales of other products.

Chevron sued the State in the United States District Court of the District of Hawaii, claimed that the statute’s rent cap effected a taking of Chevron’s property in violation of the 5th and 14th Amendments.

== Decision ==
The Fifth Amendment provides that “private property shall not be taken for public use, without just compensation.” It is made applicable to the states through the 14th Amendment. With regard to takings claims asserted as a result of government regulation (regulatory takings), the general rule is that “if a regulation goes too far it will be recognized as a taking.” As is generally the case, the Court has been searching for exactly when a regulation goes “too far.” The Court has recognized two categories of regulatory takings that are considered per se takings: where the regulation amounts to a permanent physical invasion of private property, and second, where the regulation deprives a property owner of all economically beneficial uses of their property.

When a regulation falls short of an entire deprivation of economic use or a permanent physical invasion, the Court has struggled to provide meaningful standards for determining when a regulation has effected a taking. In Agins v. City of Tiburon (1980), the Court declared that government regulation of private property effects a taking if it does not substantially advance legitimate state interests. In the majority opinion in Lingle, Justice O’Connor determined that the Agins test is no longer appropriate for determining whether a taking has occurred (it’s seen more as a due process inquiry than a takings inquiry). In its place, an aggrieved party must assert either a physical taking, a Lucas-type “total deprivation” regulation, a Penn Central-style taking, or a land-use exaction that acts as a taking.

In a concurring opinion, Justice Kennedy wrote separately to emphasize that the Court's decision did not foreclose Chevron's chances of prevailing on a due process claim. Justice Kennedy indicated that, on his view, a regulation of private property could perhaps be so arbitrary or irrational that it violated Constitutional guarantees of due process. This short concurrence seemed to indicate some openness on Justice Kennedy's part to substantive due process claims in the takings context.

== See also ==
- List of United States Supreme Court cases
- Lists of United States Supreme Court cases by volume
- List of United States Supreme Court cases by the Rehnquist Court
