= National Republican Senatorial Committee v. FEC =

2026 U.S. Supreme Court decision

National Republican Senatorial Committee v. Federal Election Commission
- Supreme Court of the United States

Argued December 9, 2025 Decided June 30, 2026
- Full case name: National Republican Senatorial Committee, et al., Petitioners v. Federal Election Commission, et al.
- Docket no.: 24-621
- Citations: 609 U.S. ___ (more)
- Opinion announcement: Opinion announcement

Case history
- Prior: Question certified. NRSC v. FEC, 712 F. Supp. 3d 1017 (S.D. Ohio 2024).; Question answered. 117 F.4th 389 (6th Cir. 2024).; Certiorari granted. 606 U.S. ___ (2025).

Holding
- FECA's political-party coordinated-expenditure limits violated the First Amendment, because they were not proportionate, necessary, or narrowly tailored given the other less-speech-restrictive tools available to the government to prevent circumvention.

Court membership
- Chief Justice John Roberts Associate Justices Clarence Thomas · Samuel Alito; Sonia Sotomayor · Elena Kagan; Neil Gorsuch · Brett Kavanaugh; Amy Coney Barrett · Ketanji Brown Jackson

Case opinions
- Majority: Kavanaugh, joined by Roberts, Thomas, Alito, Gorsuch, Barrett
- Dissent: Kagan, joined by Sotomayor, Jackson
- This case overturned a previous ruling or rulings
- FEC v. Colorado Republican Federal Campaign Committee (2001)

National Republican Senatorial Committee v. Federal Election Commission, 609 U.S. ___ (2026), was a United States Supreme Court case regarding the constitutionality of federal limits on how much political parties can spend in coordination with their candidates. The Supreme Court held that federal limits in the Federal Election Campaign Act (FECA) violated the First Amendment.

== Background ==
=== Legal background ===
Federal law has long regulated how much a political party can spend in coordination with its candidates—distinct from independent expenditures. These "coordinated party expenditure limits" were enacted to prevent donors from usurping candidate contribution limits. In 2001, the Supreme Court decided Federal Election Commission v. Colorado Republican Federal Campaign Committee (Colorado II). Colorado II upheld these limits, holding that coordinated spending was "virtually indistinguishable" from independent expenditures, and that the government had an important interest in preventing actual or apparent corruption.

In the years since Colorado II, the Supreme Court's campaign finance jurisprudence has shifted significantly. In 2010, the Court decided Citizens United v. Federal Election Commission, which struck down limits on corporate independent expenditures, reasoning that independent expenditures could not corrupt candidates. In 2014, in McCutcheon v. Federal Election Commission, the Court further narrowed the anti-corruption rationale in invalidating aggregate contribution limits. In McCutcheon, the Court emphasized that only quid pro quo corruption can justify limiting campaign contributions. In 2022, the Court decided Federal Election Commission v. Ted Cruz for Senate, which struck down a law forbidding the repayment of candidate loans with post-election contributions. In Cruz, the Court again emphasized that limits on campaign contributions must be tailored to preventing only quid pro quo corruption.

== Factual background ==
Plaintiffs are the National Republican Senatorial Committee (NRSC), the National Republican Congressional Committee (NRCC), then-candidate JD Vance, and then-Congressman Steven Joseph Chabot. In 2022, plaintiffs sued in the Southern District of Ohio challenging the coordinated party expenditure limits. Following discovery, the district court certified the question presented to the en banc United States Court of Appeals for the Sixth Circuit.

The Sixth Circuit, in an opinion by Chief Judge Jeffrey S. Sutton, ruled in favor the FEC. While acknowledging the shifting legal landscape since Colorado II, the Court concluded that the deferential review that Colorado II prescribed foreclosed plaintiffs' facial and as-applied challenges. Judge Amul Thapar concurred. His opinion reasoned that under the current legal landscape, the Federal Election Campaign Act's expenditure limits should fall. However, he acknowledged that the panel was still bound by the Supreme Court's decision in Colorado II. Judge John K. Bush similarly concurred, casting doubt on Colorado II. Judge Jane Branstetter Stranch concurred in the judgment. Her opinion criticized the majority for casting doubt on the reasoning of Colorado II, and offered a defense of FECA's coordinated party expenditure limits on the merits. Judge Rachel Bloomekatz concurred in the judgment, associating herself with Judge Stranch's opinion on the grounds of stare decisis. Judge Chad Readler dissented. His opinion argued that the changed legal landscape had rendered Colorado II obsolete, and that the Sixth Circuit was not precluded from assessing FECA's limits in light of more recent precedent.

== Supreme Court ==
On December 4, 2024, plaintiffs petitioned the Supreme Court for certiorari. On May 19, 2025, the government responded. In its filing, it declined to defend the constitutionality of FECA's limits, arguing instead that the limits violated the First Amendment. On May 30, the Democratic National Committee (DNC) filed a motion seeking to intervene to defend the constitutionality of the limits. On June 30, the Supreme Court granted certiorari, along with the DNC's motion to intervene.

On December 9, the Supreme Court heard oral arguments.

=== Decision ===
On June 30, 2026, in a 6–3 ruling along ideological lines, the Supreme Court struck down campaign finance limits in FECA as First Amendment violations.

== See also ==
- National Republican Congressional Committee v. Sherrod Brown
