= Import-Export Clause =

Clause of the United States Constitution

Article I, § 10, clause 2 of the United States Constitution, known as the Import-Export Clause, prevents the states, without the consent of Congress, from imposing tariffs on imports and exports above what is necessary for their inspection laws and secures for the federal government the revenues from all tariffs on imports and exports. Several nineteenth century Supreme Court cases applied this clause to duties and imposts on interstate imports and exports. In 1869, the United States Supreme Court ruled that the Import-Export Clause only applied to imports and exports with foreign nations and did not apply to imports and exports with other states, although this interpretation has been questioned by modern legal scholars.

== Text ==
No State shall, without the Consent of the Congress, lay any Imposts or Duties on Imports or Exports, except what may be absolutely necessary for executing it's [sic] inspection Laws: and the net Produce of all Duties and Imposts, laid by any State on Imports or Exports, shall be for the Use of the Treasury of the United States; and all such Laws shall be subject to the Revision and Controul [sic] of the Congress.

— United States Constitution Article I, § 10, Clause 2

== Origins and adoption ==
The United States were first organized under the Articles of Confederation, under which the states maintained significant autonomy while the national government was weak. Among the major weaknesses of the Articles of Confederation was the inability to regulate commerce with foreign nations and among the states and the inability of the national government to impose taxes. The national government lacked power to enforce acts of Congress and requests for money from the states were frequently ignored. The Articles of Confederation did contain a similar clause on state duties:

No State shall lay any imposts or duties, which may interfere with any stipulations in treaties, entered into by the united States in congress assembled, with any king, prince, or State, in pursuance of any treaties already proposed by congress, to the courts of France and Spain.

— Article VI, Clause 3

Under the Articles of Confederation, Congress could not effectively prevent states from imposing tariffs and regulations that conflicted with Congress' efforts to regulate trade with foreign nations. There was also considerable commercial strife between the states without major ports and those with major ports, which used tariffs on goods destined to other states to generate revenue. New Jersey, sandwiched between the ports in New York and Philadelphia, was compared to a "cask tapped at both ends"; North Carolina, located between the ports in Virginia and Charleston, was likened to "a patient bleeding at both stumps". Also, under the Articles of Confederation, the federal government did not have any secure funding.

The Import-Export Clause was adopted by the Constitutional Convention a few days after adopting the Export Clause, which prohibits the federal government from imposing taxes or duties on exports. The adoption of the Import-Export Clause received considerable debate, more so than the Export Clause or the Commerce Clause. The Constitutional Convention also decided that tariffs on imports was to be the main source of revenue for the federal government. In Federalist No. 12, Alexander Hamilton made the argument that tariffs on imports would need to be the primary source of revenue for the new federal government and that the federal government could more effectively impose tariffs on imports than the states could separately.

In Michelin Tire Corp. v. Wages (1976), the U.S. Supreme Court explained the purpose of this clause:

The Framers of the Constitution thus sought to alleviate three main concerns by committing sole power to lay imposts and duties on imports in the Federal Government, with no concurrent state power: the Federal Government must speak with one voice when regulating commercial relations with foreign governments, and tariffs, which might affect foreign relations, could not be implemented by the States consistently with that exclusive power; import revenues were to be the major source of revenue of the Federal Government, and should not be diverted to the States; and harmony among the States might be disturbed unless seaboard States, with their crucial ports of entry, were prohibited from levying taxes on citizens of other States by taxing goods merely flowing through their ports to the other States not situated as favorably geographically.

— Michelin Tire Corp. v. Wages, 423 U.S. at 285-286

== Relationship with other Article I provisions ==
=== Tonnage Clause ===
The Tonnage Clause (Art. I, § 10, clause 3), prevents states from imposing taxes based on the tonnage (internal capacity) of a vessel, which is an indirect method of taxing imports and exports. At the time the Constitution was adopted, duties of tonnage were imposed on ships for entering or lying in a harbor and were distinct from charges imposed for pilotage or loading and unloading cargo. In Clyde Mallory Lines v. Alabama, the Supreme Court explained that the prohibition on tonnage duties "was due to the desire of the framers to supplement [the Import-Export Clause] ... by forbidding a corresponding tax on the privilege of access by vessels to the ports of a state, and to their doubts whether the Commerce Clause would accomplish that purpose." The Tonnage Clause was also, like the Import-Export Clause, intended to prevent states with convenient ports from taxing goods destined to states which lacked good ports.

=== Export Clause ===
The Export Clause (Art. I, §9, clause 5) prohibits the federal government from imposing any "tax or duty ... on articles exported from any state." The clause was proposed by southern states, which feared that northern states would control Congress and raise a disproportionate amount of revenue for the federal government from southern states through taxes on exports. Also, "No Preference shall be given by any Regulation of Commerce or Revenue to the Ports of one State over those of another: nor shall Vessels bound to, or from, one State, be obliged to enter, clear, or pay Duties in another." (Art. I, §9, clause 6)

The Export Clause has historically been interpreted in harmony with the Import-Export Clause. In Brown v. Maryland (1827), the Supreme Court remarked that "there is some diversity in language" between the Export Clause and Import-Export Clause, "but none is perceivable in the act which is prohibited." The difference in language—"no tax or duty" in the Export Clause versus "any impost or duty on imports or exports" in the Import-Export Clause—needed to be addressed in the wake of the new interpretation of the Import-Export Clause adopted by the Supreme Court in Michelin. In United States v. IBM (1996), the Supreme Court determined that there was a meaningful difference in the language of the two clauses and that the Export Clause prohibits even nondiscriminatory taxes on exports.

=== Commerce Clause ===
The Commerce Clause, which grants Congress the authority to "regulate trade with foreign nations, among the states, and with the Indian Tribes," complements the authority of Congress given in the Import-Export Clause. Following the Michelin interpretation of the Import-Export Clause, the U.S. Supreme Court re-examined its application of the dormant commerce clause doctrine in Complete Auto Transit, Inc. v. Brady, which related to interstate commerce and established a four-prong test in which a tax is valid if it "is applied to an activity with a substantial nexus with the taxing State, is fairly apportioned, does not discriminate against interstate commerce, and is fairly related to the services provided by the State." In Japan Line, Ltd. v. County of Los Angeles, the U.S. Supreme Court had occasion to consider the application of the dormant commerce clause doctrine to foreign commerce. In addition to the four-prong test in Complete Auto Transit, the court added two prongs derived from the Import-Export Clause: whether the tax creates a risk of multiple taxation and whether it impairs the federal government's one voice in dealing with foreign nations. The dormant commerce clause is important in complementing the Import-Export Clause (which only prohibits "imposts" and "duties"), since the former also prohibits discriminatory regulations. In West Lynn Creamery, Inc. v. Healy, for example, the Supreme Court cited a tariff as "the paradigmatic example of a law discriminating against interstate commerce ... so patently unconstitutional that our cases reveal not a single attempt by any State to enact one. Instead the cases are filled with state laws that aspire to reap some of the benefits of tariffs by other means."

== Case law history ==
=== Brown v. Maryland ===
In 1827, the Supreme Court addressed a Maryland act that required importers and persons selling imported items to obtain a license, which cost $50 ($1,056 in 2015 dollars), before they could sell imported goods. The act prescribed a $150 penalty ($3,169 in 2015 dollars) for violating its provisions. The plaintiff in the case was charged, and found guilty by the Maryland courts, with selling one package of foreign dry goods without a license.

The court's opinion, written by Chief Justice John Marshall, began with a lexicographical analysis of the clause:

An impost, or duty on imports is a custom or a tax levied on articles brought into a country, and is most usually secured before the importer is allowed to exercise his rights of ownership over them, because evasions of the law can be prevented more certainly by executing it while the articles are in its custody. It would not, however, be less an impost or duty on the articles, if it were to be levied on them after they were landed. ... What, then, are "imports?" The lexicons inform us they are "things imported." If we appeal to usage for the meaning of the word, we shall receive the same answer. They are the articles themselves which are brought into the country. "A duty on imports," then, is not merely a duty on the act of importation, but is a duty on the thing imported. It is not, taken in its literal sense, confined to a duty levied while the article is entering the country, but extends to a duty levied after it has entered the country.

The Import-Export Clause has an exception for state inspection laws. Since state inspections were carried out on land, for both imports and exports, a "tax or duty of inspection" was "frequently, if not always, paid for service performed on land" once the imported item was within the country. Marshall thus concluded that "th[e] exception in favor of duties for the support of inspection laws goes far in proving that the framers of the Constitution classed taxes of a similar character with those imposed for the purposes of inspection, with duties on imports and exports, and supposed them to be prohibited."

Prior to the Constitution, there was significant trade quarrels among the states and uniformity in trade relations with foreign countries was difficult since states acted in their own interests without respecting the interests of other states. Imposts and duties on imports and exports was a subject given solely to Congress, "plainly because, in the general opinion, the interest of all would be best promoted by placing that whole subject under the control of Congress." Regardless of whether that power was to prevent state taxation from disrupting harmony between the states, prevent states from hindering uniform trade relations between the US and foreign nations, or reserve this source of revenue solely to the government, "it is plain that the object would be as completely defeated by a power to tax the article in the hands of the importer the instant it was landed as by a power to tax it while entering the port. There is no difference in effect between a power to prohibit the sale of an article and a power to prohibit its introduction into the country. ... No goods would be imported if none could be sold." It was not relevant how small or large the tax was or whether states would act in a manner injurious to their commercial interests, as "it cannot be conceded that each [state] would respect the interests of others." Furthermore, if the major importing states levied taxes on imports that were then transported to other states, the latter would likely impose countervailing measures.

The opinion remarked on the difference between the Import-Export Clause and Export Clause: while "[t]here is some diversity in language" (imposts and duties in the Import-Export Clause; taxes or duties in the Export Clause), "none is perceivable in the act which is prohibited." The opinion concluded by noting two issues that were left open: "It may be proper to add that we suppose the principles laid down in this case to apply equally to importations from a sister state. We do not mean to give any opinion on a tax discriminating between foreign and domestic articles."

=== Applicability to interstate commerce ===
In Brown v. Maryland, Chief Justice Marshall remarked on the applicability of the Import-Export Clause to interstate commerce, remarking that "we suppose the principles laid down in this case, to apply equally to importations from a sister State." In 1860, Chief Justice Taney, who had argued for Maryland in Brown v. Maryland, wrote the Supreme Court's opinion in Almy v. California, which found a tax on a bill of lading for gold dust exported from California to New York violated the Import Export Clause. "We think this case cannot be distinguished from that of Brown v. Maryland," he wrote, concluding that "the state tax in question is a duty upon the export of gold and silver, and consequently repugnant to the [Import-Export Clause]."

In 1869, however, the Supreme Court was presented with a case, Woodruff v. Parham, specifically addressing whether the Import-Export Clause applied to merchandise brought into a state from other states. The court began by examining the usage of the terms "imports" and "imposts" in Brown:

In the case of Brown v. Maryland, the word imports, as used in the [Import-Export Clause], is defined, both on the authority of the lexicons and of usage, to be articles brought into the country; and impost is there said to be a duty, custom, or tax levied on articles brought into the country. In the ordinary use of these terms at this day, no one would, for a moment, think of them as having relation to any other articles than those brought from a country foreign to the United States, and at the time the case of Brown v. Maryland was decided.

The court then proceeded into a lexicographical inquiry of the terms "imports" and "imposts" used elsewhere in the Constitution. The court first examined the terms in Article I, § 8, clause 1, which provides that "Congress shall have power to levy and collect taxes, duties, imposts, and excises, ... but all duties, imposts, and excises shall be uniform throughout the United States." If the term "imposts" was intended to include duties on interstate imports, it would be rendered invalid by Article I, § 9, clause 5—"No Tax or Duty shall be laid on Articles exported from any State"—because any import into one state from another would be an export which Congress could not tax. In the court's view, Congress' authority to impose internal taxes was provided for by the terms "taxes" and "excises".

The court reasoned that "the words imports, exports, and imposts are used with exclusive reference to foreign trade" in Article VI, §3 and Article IX, §1 of the Articles of Confederation and found that the records of the Constitutional Convention used the words "duty," "impost," and "import" in reference to foreign trade. The court's final line of reasoning was that application of the Import-Export Clause to interstate commerce would produce "the grossest injustice" and that the "equality of public burdens in all our large cities [would be] impossible," because contemporary case law prohibited the taxation of imports. "The merchant of Chicago who buys his goods in New York and sells at wholesale in the original packages, may have his millions employed in trade for half a lifetime and escape all State, county, and city taxes; for all that he is worth is invested in goods which he claims to be protected as imports from New York."

Justice Samuel Nelson dissented from the court's ruling in Woodruff, reasoning first that the majority's decision leaves "no security or protection ... in this government against obstructions and interruptions of commerce among the States," which was one of the primary issues prompting the Constitutional Convention. However, the later development of the dormant Commerce Clause doctrine later addressed this issue. Justice Nelson further critiqued the court's lexicographical inquiry:

In looking at this clause, it will be seen that there is nothing in its terms, or connection, that affords the slightest indication that it was intended to be confined to the prohibition of a tax upon foreign imports. Surely, if this had been intended, it must have occurred to the distinguished members of the Convention, it would be quite important to say so that the prohibition might not be misunderstood, especially when we take into consideration the eminent men who not only discussed and settled the terms and meaning of the clause, but to whom the whole instrument was committed for special and final revision. It would have been easy to have made the clause clear by affixing the word "foreign" before the word "imports." Then the clause would read "foreign imports," that now is affixed, by construction, a pretty liberal one of the fundamental charter of the government.

In his view, there is nothing in the Constitution or the records of the Constitutional Convention to suggest the Import-Export Clause only applied to foreign goods.

In 1945, the Supreme Court held that the Import-Export Clause applied to imports from the Philippine Islands, which at that time was a territory of the United States.

=== The original package doctrine ===
In Low v. Austin (1872), the Supreme Court was given the question of "whether imported merchandise, upon which the duties and charges at the custom-house have been paid, is subject to State taxation, whilst remaining in the original cases, unbroken and unsold, in the hands of the importer." The court, drawing on Brown and the opinion of Chief Justice Taney in the License Cases (1847) decided that:

[T]he goods imported do not lose their character as imports, and become incorporated into the mass of property of the State, until they have passed from the control of the importer or been broken up by him from their original cases. Whilst retaining their character as imports, a tax upon them, in any shape, is within the constitutional prohibition. The question is not as to the extent of the tax, or its equality with respect to taxes on other property, but as to the power of the State to levy any tax.

This doctrine, which became known as the "original package doctrine", would define the interpretation of the Import-Export Clause for over a century.

=== Michelin Tire Corp. v. Wages ===
In 1976, the U.S. Supreme Court re-examined the original package doctrine and fundamentally changed its Import-Export Clause analysis. The case concerned whether a local ad valorum tax on a business' inventory could be applied to imported tires held in a Michelin warehouse pending distribution to the company's retail outlets. About 75% of the tires had been loaded into truck trailers (known as "sea vans") that were loaded onto ships in France or Nova Scotia, transported to the U.S., then driven to the Georgia warehouse. The remaining 25% were placed on trailers in Nova Scotia, then driven to the Michelin warehouse. In both cases, at the warehouse the tires were unloaded, sorted, and stored until purchased and delivered to a retail store. The ad valorum tax applied to business inventory regardless of whether it was imported or not and was therefore non-discriminatory. The tires were not individually packaged during the importation process. Under the "original package" doctrine, the tires could not be subjected to even non-discriminatory taxes until they lost their character as imports and became incorporated into the general mass of property of the state. Because it was impractical to individually package some items shipped in bulk, the defining time for items shipped in bulk was when they were broken up.

The question before the U.S. Supreme Court was whether the tires had lost their "distinctive character" as imports once they were unloaded from the sea-vans, sorted, and stored in Michelin's warehouse. However, the court chose sua sponte to investigate the meaning of the Import-Export Clause, noting that "[c]ommentators have uniformly agreed that Low v. Austin misread [Brown v. Maryland]" to prohibit "nondiscriminatory ad valorem property taxes among prohibited 'imposts' or 'duties.'" The court's decision was that "a nondiscriminatory ad valorem property tax is not the type of state exaction which the Framers of the Constitution or the Court in Brown had in mind as being an 'impost' or 'duty' and that Low v. Austin's reliance upon the Brown dictum to reach the contrary conclusion was misplaced." It summarized the purpose of the clause as:

The Framers of the Constitution thus sought to alleviate three main concerns by committing sole power to lay imposts and duties on imports in the Federal Government, with no concurrent state power: the Federal Government must speak with one voice when regulating commercial relations with foreign governments, and tariffs, which might affect foreign relations, could not be implemented by the States consistently with that exclusive power; import revenues were to be the major source of revenue of the Federal Government, and should not be diverted to the States; and harmony among the States might be disturbed unless seaboard States, with their crucial ports of entry, were prohibited from levying taxes on citizens of other States by taxing goods merely flowing through their ports to the other States not situated as favorably geographically.

— Michelin Tire Corp. v. Wages, 423 U.S. at 285-286

== See also ==
- Tariff of 1789 – First Act of United States Congress
- Section 90 of the Constitution of Australia - similar provision in Australian Constitution for which, if not intentionally borrowed by its framers, the High Court of Australia has considered the Import-Export Clause of the U.S. Constitution when interpreting
