= Payne v. Tennessee =

- Supreme Court of the United States

Argued April 24, 1991 Decided June 27, 1991
- Full case name: Pervis Tyrone Payne v. Tennessee
- Citations: 501 U.S. 808 (more) 111 S.Ct. 2597; 115 L. Ed. 2d 720
- Argument: Oral argument

Case history
- Prior: State v. Payne, 791 S.W.2d 10 (Tenn. 1990); cert. granted, 498 U.S. 1076 (1991).

Holding
- The admission of a victim impact statement does not violate the Cruel and Unusual Punishment Clause of the Eighth Amendment.

Court membership
- Chief Justice William Rehnquist Associate Justices Byron White · Thurgood Marshall; Harry Blackmun · John P. Stevens; Sandra Day O'Connor · Antonin Scalia; Anthony Kennedy · David Souter

Case opinions
- Majority: Rehnquist, joined by White, O'Connor, Scalia, Kennedy, Souter
- Concurrence: O'Connor, joined by White, Kennedy
- Concurrence: Scalia, joined by O'Connor, Kennedy
- Concurrence: Souter, joined by Kennedy
- Dissent: Marshall, joined by Blackmun
- Dissent: Stevens, joined by Blackmun

Laws applied
- U.S. Const. amends. VIII, XIV
- This case overturned a previous ruling or rulings
- Booth v. Maryland (1987); South Carolina v. Gathers (1989)

Payne v. Tennessee, 501 U.S. 808 (1991), was a United States Supreme Court case, authored by Chief Justice William Rehnquist, which held that testimony in the form of a victim impact statement is admissible during the sentencing phase of a trial and, in death penalty cases, does not violate the Cruel and Unusual Punishment Clause of the Eighth Amendment. Payne overturned two of the Courts' precedents: Booth v. Maryland (1987) and South Carolina v. Gathers (1989).

== Background ==
2025 Mugshot of Pervis Tyrone Payne

Pervis Tyrone Payne (born March 1, 1967) was the defendant in this trial prosecuted in Tennessee. According to his criminal conviction, on Saturday, June 27, 1987, he attempted to rape an acquaintance of his, Charisse Christopher, and murdered her and her two-year-old daughter, Lacie Jo. Neighbors allegedly heard noises and yelling, and called the police. Upon arriving, a police officer "immediately encountered Payne who was leaving the apartment building, so covered in blood that he appeared to be 'sweating blood'".

The defendant,in contrast, said that he was waiting for his girlfriend to return to her apartment in Millington, Tennessee, when he heard screams from her neighbor and discovered that the neighbor, Charisse Christopher, and her children had been attacked. Payne and many other witnesses saw a man leaving the crime scene shortly before Payne arrived. He had found the knife still stuck in the throat of Charisse and pulled it out. In his panic, he still tried to help, but as soon as he saw police arriving, he had a bad feeling that they would mistake him for the attacker. He fled when the police arrived.

The police found "a horrifying scene." Forty-two stab wounds were on Charisse's body, and Lacie Jo and Nicholas, Charisse's three-year-old son, had suffered stab wounds as well. Payne fled to his girlfriend's house, and discarded his clothes, which were allegedly soaked in blood. Meanwhile, Nicholas Christopher held in his intestines while the emergency medical technicians transported him to the emergency room. The physical evidence implicating the defendant was: his fingerprints on cans of malt liquor, the victims' blood soaked into his clothes, and his property left at the scene of the crime.

Dozens of witnesses, including the police, friends, the neighbors, and experts, testified at the trial. The evidence that he perpetrated the attacks was "overwhelming," according to Chief Justice Rehnquist. Payne denied the charges, claiming he came upon the bloody victims. The district attorney stressed, in his closing arguments, the senselessness of the killings, the violence displayed by the defendant, and the innocence of the victims. The jury convicted him of two counts of first-degree murder and two counts of attempted murder and a related charge.

At the sentencing phase, the judge allowed both the public defender to adduce mitigating testimony from the defendant's friends and family, and the district attorney (DA) to introduce evidence from the grandmother/mother of the victims. Payne appealed to the Tennessee Supreme Court, and then asked for a writ of certiorari from the United States Supreme Court. Certiorari was granted, with the Court noting that it would have to reconsider its past precedent. The case was argued on April 24, 1991 and decided on June 27, 1991.

In April of 2021 Tennessee Governor Bill Less granted him a temporary reprieve of execution due to disruptions that were caused by the COVID-19 pandemic.

== Opinion of the Court ==
The Court held that testimony in the form of a victim impact statement was admissible and constitutional in death penalty cases, overturning Booth v. Maryland (1987) and South Carolina v. Gathers (1989). In Booth the Court stated that victim impact statements had nothing to do with the "blameworthiness of a particular defendant".

Writing for the Court, Chief Justice Rehnquist provided a variety of reasons for the decision to allow victim impact statements:

1. The sentencer has the right to consider all relevant evidence, within the rules of evidence.
2. The principle that the punishment should fit the crime is relevant here, and this was a particularly aggravated and savage murder.
3. Stare decisis is "not an inexorable command", and the Supreme Court, since Marbury v. Madison (1803), has decided what the law is.
4. Because the defendant has the right to present mitigating evidence at the sentencing phase, the prosecution should be able to present aggravating evidence about the victim (Justice Stevens, in dissent, characterizes this argument as a non sequitur: the defendant has constitutional rights because he is on trial - the victim is not on trial and has no constitutional rights in the proceeding).
5. The trial was fair in all respects, and mitigating evidence ought to be presented with damaging evidence when available.

Justices Stevens and Marshall wrote dissenting opinions, with Justice Blackmun joining each of them.

== Impact ==
Payne has had a significant, ongoing impact in victim's rights, criminology, stare decisis, and the lives of the parties involved.

The case allowed victim impact statements in U.S. courts, and the overwhelming majority of states now allow such use in the sentencing phase of trials, and was a significant development in the victims' rights movement. One scholar wrote:

Among the most significant products of the Victim's Rights Movement over the past decade has been the revival of the use of victim impact evidence—evidence relating to the victim's personal characteristics and the emotional impact of the crime on others--during capital sentencing. With its decision in Payne v. Tennessee (1991), the US Supreme Court not only reversed its own recent precedent holding such evidence to be unconstitutional, it left only a vague and malleable standard for limiting its admissibility.

— Joel F. Donahue

Another scholar calls the verdict in Payne an example of "symbolic violence." It was pointed out that:

Rehnquist's reliance on this image of the perpetrator as a rabid animal that is foaming at the mouth helps to justify the violence of Payne's death sentence while it also obscures that violence. The majority opinion in Payne, like the prosecutor's arguments before the jury, hinges on contrasting little Nicholas to Pervis Payne, juxtaposing Nicholas's smallness and vulnerability to Payne's murderous and inhuman power. The smaller and more innocent the victim, the stronger and more guilty the defendant appears.

— Jennifer K. Wood

The case was one in a line of cases that showed how the Rehnquist Court shifted to the conservative or "right" on criminal cases. The case is cited by at least one major college text book as a "capstone case." Colin Starger has pointed out that the current split in the Court's jurisprudence between "strong" and "weak" conceptions of stare decisis (both of which are ultimately descended from a 1932 dissenting opinion by Louis Brandeis) arises from the disagreement between the Rehnquist majority opinion and the Marshall dissenting opinion in this case.

== Scheduled executions ==
Payne's execution was stayed in April 2007, and after protracted litigation, again scheduled in December 2007, and stayed again that month.

Payne was later scheduled to be executed on December 3, 2020. However, he was granted a temporary reprieve until April 9, 2021, due to the COVID-19 pandemic in Tennessee.

== Subsequent developments ==
Payne continues to maintain his innocence and has attracted supporters such as The Innocence Project and The Southern Christian Leadership Conference founded by Dr. Martin Luther King Jr. In September 2020, DNA testing was ordered to investigate Payne's claims of innocence. The results of this test were ruled "not favorable for Mr. Payne" and the motion dismissed.

On November 18, 2021, the Shelby County District Attorney General announced that Payne was no longer on death row and would instead serve two consecutive life sentences. Since 2002, executions of people with intellectual disabilities have been ruled unconstitutional in the United States, and a law passed by the Tennessee General Assembly in April 2021 allowed for death row inmates to appeal their sentences on intellectual disability grounds. After a review of the evidence, Payne was found to have an intellectual disability, making him ineligible for execution. On January 31, 2022, Payne was resentenced to two concurrent life sentences, including credit for time served for an assault charge; Payne will be eligible for parole by 2027.

On June 16, 2025, the Tennessee Supreme Court upheld Payne's life sentences but disagreed with the lower court's decision to order Payne to serve concurrent life terms, and ordered that these sentences shall run consecutively, rendering Payne ineligible for parole until 2056.

== See also ==
- Crime in the United States
- Criminology
- Crime victim advocacy program
- List of United States Supreme Court cases, volume 501
- List of United States Supreme Court cases
- Lists of United States Supreme Court cases by volume
- List of United States Supreme Court cases by the Rehnquist Court
- Victimology
- Victim Support
- Victim study
