= Alabama v. Smith =

- Supreme Court of the United States

Decided June 12, 1989
- Full case name: Alabama v. Smith
- Citations: 490 U.S. 794 (more)

Holding
- If a criminal defendant received a sentence after a guilty plea but withdrew that plea and was convicted at trial, the judge may hand down a more severe sentence.

Court membership
- Chief Justice William Rehnquist Associate Justices William J. Brennan Jr. · Byron White; Thurgood Marshall · Harry Blackmun; John P. Stevens · Sandra Day O'Connor; Antonin Scalia · Anthony Kennedy

Case opinions
- Majority: Rehnquist, joined by Brennan, White, Blackmun, Stevens, O’Connor, Scalia, Kennedy
- Dissent: Marshall
- This case overturned a previous ruling or rulings
- Simpson v. Rice

Alabama v. Smith, 490 U.S. 794 (1989), was a United States Supreme Court case in which the Court held that, if a criminal defendant received a sentence after a guilty plea but withdrew that plea and was convicted at trial, the judge may hand down a more severe sentence.
