= Washington Public Ports Association =

Government organization in Washington, United States

Association overview
- Formed: 1961
- Type: Non-profit trade association
- Headquarters: 1501 Capitol Way South, Suite 304; Olympia, Washington
- Association executives: Glen Bachman, Port of Everett, President; Eric ffitch, Executive Director
- Website: www.washingtonports.org

Washington Public Ports Association (WPPA) is a non-profit trade association created in 1961 by the Washington State Legislature to promote local port community interests.

== Authority ==
WPPA's many purposes are outlined in RCW Chapter 53.06.030 :

- to initiate and carry on the necessary studies, investigations and surveys required for the proper development and improvement of the commerce and business generally common to all port districts both within and without the state of Washington, and other operators of terminal and transportation facilities for this purpose, and to make such expenditures as are necessary for these purposes, including the proper promotion and advertising of all such properties, utilities and facilities;
- to establish coordinating and joint marketing bodies of association members, including but not limited to establishment of a federation of Washington ports as described in RCW 53.06.070 , as may be necessary to provide effective and efficient marketing of the state's trade, tourism and travel resources;
- to exchange information relative to port construction, maintenance, operation, administration and management;
- to promote and encourage port development along sound economic lines;
- to promote and encourage the development of transportation commerce and industry;
- to operate as a clearinghouse for information, public relations and liaison for the port districts of the state and to serve as a channel for cooperation among the various port districts and for the assembly and presentation of information relating to the needs and requirements of port districts to the public.

== Organization and Structure ==
The Association is governed by a Board of Trustees, consisting of one representative from each member port. This Board meetings twice annually, and Trustees serve until replaced by a majority vote of their respective port commission.

A six-member Executive Committee, consisting of a president, vice-president, secretary, treasurer and the two most recent past presidents, oversees Association administration and management.

The Board of Trustees elects Executive Committee members and appoints an Executive Director to manage Association activities.

The WPPA maintains standing committees whose leaders are appointed by the WPPA president and through which members can bring issues of concern to the Association. Standing committees include: Aviation, Budget, Environmental Policy, Environmental Technical, Finance and Administration, Legal, Legislative, Long-Range Planning, Marina, Nominating, Public Relations, Trade and Economic Development and Transportation and Infrastructure.
