= Agostini v. Felton =

- Supreme Court of the United States

Argued April 15, 1997 Decided June 23, 1997
- Full case name: Rachel Agostini et al. v. Betty Louise Felton et al.
- Citations: 521 U.S. 203 (more) 117 S. Ct. 1997; 138 L. Ed. 2d 391

Case history
- Prior: Felton v. Sec'y, U.S. Dep't of Educ., 101 F.3d 1394 (2d Cir. 1996); cert. granted, 519 U.S. 1086 (1997).

Holding
- Reverses Aguilar v. Felton in allowing public school teachers to instruct at religious schools, so long as the material was secular and neutral in nature and no "excessive entanglement" between government and religion was apparent.

Court membership
- Chief Justice William Rehnquist Associate Justices John P. Stevens · Sandra Day O'Connor; Antonin Scalia · Anthony Kennedy; David Souter · Clarence Thomas; Ruth Bader Ginsburg · Stephen Breyer

Case opinions
- Majority: O'Connor, joined by Rehnquist, Scalia, Kennedy, Thomas
- Dissent: Souter, joined by Stevens, Ginsburg; Breyer (Part II)
- Dissent: Ginsburg, joined by Stevens, Souter, Breyer

Laws applied
- Establishment Clause of the U.S. Const. amend. I
- This case overturned a previous ruling or rulings
- School Dist. of Grand Rapids v. Ball (1985) (in part); Aguilar v. Felton (1985)

Agostini v. Felton, 521 U.S. 203 (1997), is a landmark decision of the Supreme Court of the United States. In this case, the Court overruled its decision in Aguilar v. Felton (1985), now finding that it was not a violation of the Establishment Clause of the First Amendment for a state-sponsored education initiative to allow public school teachers to instruct at religious schools, so long as the material was secular and neutral in nature and no "excessive entanglement" between government and religion was apparent. This case is noteworthy in a broader sense as a sign of evolving judicial standards surrounding the First Amendment, and the changes that have occurred in modern Establishment Clause jurisprudence.

== Background ==
In 1965, Congress enacted Title I of the Elementary and Secondary Education Act with the goal of providing adequate education to all children in the United States, regardless of individual economic conditions. This service, abbreviated as Title I, distributed federal funds to state governments, which, in turn, disbursed the funds to local education agencies. This funding was to be put towards providing remedial education services for low-income students who were at significant risk of failing to meet state academic performance standards. By law, these education services were to be provided to eligible students, whether enrolled in public school or not. Further, the services offered to children attending private schools were to be "equitable in comparison" to the services offered to children attending public school. All educational services were to be of a secular, neutral, and non-ideological nature.

In 1966, the Board of Education of the City of New York ("Board") applied for Title I funding. In the eligible districts in New York City, 10% of schoolchildren attend private school, and of those 10%, 90% attended schools of a particular religious ideology. To prevent First Amendment complications, the Board arranged to bus private school attendees to public schools for after-school instruction. This plan failed, and another one was adopted, which failed as well. The Board then moved on to a plan whereby public school teachers would be permitted to provide instruction in the private school buildings themselves. A number of stipulations were attached to this, aimed at preventing a violation of the Establishment Clause, including mandatory surprise visits by state-employed supervisors and removal of all religious articles from the room to be used for Title I instruction. This plan was reviewed by the Supreme Court in Aguilar v. Felton, where it was deemed to create a constitutionally impermissible "entanglement" between government and religion. The District Court, on remand, issued an injunction, enjoining the Board from following a Title I plan that violated the decision.

After the Court's decision in Aguilar, the Board had to devise a new plan to provide Title I services without creating a conflict between Church and State. This plan involved spending over $100,000,000 in leasing property and vehicles to provide areas for public school teachers to instruct their students. This money, incurred annually over a series of years, had to be deducted from the Title 1 grant before the grant money was to be used for actual services provided, resulting in a net decrease in available funds for remedial education. In 1995, the Board, along with a group of parents of eligible parochial school attendees, filed motions in District Court, seeking an exemption from the Aguilar decision under Federal Rule of Civil Procedure 60(b). This rule states, in part, that an exemption from a final judgment may be granted if it is found that it is, "no longer equitable that the judgment should have prospective application." They argued that cases decided by the Supreme Court between Aguilar and 1995 had eroded the meaning of Aguilar, and that it was no longer good law. The District Court appeared sympathetic, and said that they were pursuing the appropriate method of relief, but denied the motion, noting that Aguilar was still in effect and it was unable to offer the exemption the Board sought. The Court of Appeals for the Second Circuit affirmed the denial of the motion. The Supreme Court granted certiorari and heard arguments on April 15, 1997. Acting Solicitor General Walter Dellinger appeared on behalf of the Secretary of Education, and Corporation Counsel of New York City Paul A. Crotty argued for the city. The respondents were represented by Stanley Geller, the former president of the National Committee for Public Education and Religious Liberty, who had previously argued Aguilar before the Supreme Court.

== Arguments ==
The petitioners argument for relief revolved around three primary points.

1. The tremendous costs involved with running their Title I program in accordance with Aguilar constituted a substantial change of fact. They argued that, because these costs were not expected to be so high at the start, it was now imprudent to force them to continue in this fashion. The respondents countered by saying that the costs of implementing the program were, in fact, known when Aguilar was decided, which would mean that no change in circumstances had occurred.
2. Prevailing agreement in the judiciary had turned against Aguilar, with a majority of Justices having expressed their opinion that Aguilar should be reversed or, at least, reconsidered.
3. Subsequent Establishment Clause rulings by the Supreme Court had undermined the legal basis upon which Aguilar was decided. The argument was that, if the case's decision had been so considerably weakened over the years, it was no longer good law and should be reversed.

== Decision ==
On June 23, 1997, Justice O'Connor delivered the opinion of the court. The decision was generally divided along ideological lines, with Chief Justice Rehnquist and Justices Scalia, Thomas, and Kennedy joining the majority, and Justices Stevens, Souter, Ginsburg and Breyer dissenting.

The Court accepted the respondents' argument that there was no substantial change in factual circumstances. While there was obviously an increase in Board expenditures in maintaining their program, the Court noted that cost increases were not only predicted in Aguilar, they had been practically guaranteed. Furthermore, since the applicable case law had not changed since the Aguilar decision, there was nothing the Court could see as constituting a substantial change in factual circumstances.

On the second argument, the Court again sided with the respondents. It noted that, indeed, five of the Justices had advocated a reconsideration of Aguilar when deciding another case. However, the Court said, this did not necessarily mean there had been a change in their jurisprudence or reasoning, because Aguilar's propriety was not in question when those comments were made. The Court stated that the views of its members, outside of a judgment to this effect, did not constitute a change in Establishment Clause law.

The third argument is given the most examination by the Court. In order to determine if decisions subsequent to Aguilar have actually undermined it or the basis for its findings, the Court examines the cases and the changes in views since that decision was made. The Court notes that it has moved away from the idea that a public employee teaching in a parochial school will necessarily inculcate some of the religious messages inherent in their pervasively sectarian environment. It notes, for example, that in Zobrest v. Catalina Foothills School Dist. the Court ruled that it was permissible for a deaf student to have a state-sponsored interpreter attend his Catholic high school in the performance of her duties. In this vein, the Court concludes that to consider a public employee's presence in a religious school inappropriate in and of itself would put far too much emphasis on form over substance.

Another change in the Court's approach was that it no longer considered impermissible the use of government money to directly aid the educational functions of a religious school. As long as the money was given without government stipulations as to how it was spent, it was acceptable for such funding to be made available. Citing Witters v. Washington Dept. of Servs. for Blind, the Court noted that it was not impermissible for the government to give vocational grants, even if the grant would be used to train for some religious job in the future, as long as there was an intervening "genuinely independent and private" choice of where the money would be spent. The Court compared this with a government employee receiving his paycheck, noting that it was certainly acceptable for the government to pay this employee even if it were clear he was going to donate a large portion of it to a religious organization.

The idea of a public employee teaching in a religious school, the Court went on to say, was no longer commonly considered to foster a "symbolic union" between Church and State. Noting that the Dissent believed that, in fact, this did foster such a symbolic union, the Court countered by stating that it cannot be shown that such a symbolic union would vanish once the students and teachers were moved off campus. Taking that reasoning to its logical conclusion, it would forbid Title I entirely, as the union would be unavoidable. Further, the Court rejected the idea that Title I would be financing religious indoctrination if instruction could be conducted on religious campuses; Title I specifically notes that it is designed to "supplement, not supplant" the school's curriculum.

Applying these rationales to the Board's case, the Court determined that the program, previously found unconstitutional in Aguilar, was neither aiding nor inhibiting religion in an impermissible fashion. Reasoning that the aid was distributed according to secular criteria, and offered to all eligible students regardless of school choice, the system of distributing aid was neutral with respect to religion. The program as enacted by the Board did not give any incentive for anyone to alter their religious views.

The Court ultimately overruled Aguilar. It noted that, while stare decisis is an important doctrine, the Court is not prohibited by precedent to review changes in law or making alterations to previous decisions. It concluded that prevailing Establishment Clause law had changed significantly since Aguilar was decided, making Aguilar no longer good law. In summarizing its position, the Court notes:

New York City's Title I program does not run afoul of any of three primary criteria we currently use to evaluate whether government aid has the effect of advancing religion: it does not result in governmental indoctrination; define its recipients by reference to religion; or create an excessive entanglement. We therefore hold that a federally funded program providing supplemental, remedial instruction to disadvantaged children on a neutral basis is not invalid under the Establishment Clause when such instruction is given on the premises of sectarian schools by government employees pursuant to a program containing safeguards such as those present here. The same considerations that justify this holding require us to conclude that this carefully constrained program also cannot reasonably be viewed as an endorsement of religion.

In closing, the Court reversed the judgment of the Court of Appeals, remanding the case down to them, and giving the lower court instructions to vacate its injunction. Because Aguilar was no longer good law, and the plan constructed by the Board did not create an excessive entanglement with religion, the Court concluded that the Board was entitled to the relief it had sought; moreover, the relief was not simply based on a federal rule, the decision removed the need for the Board to seek the exemption at all.

== Dissent ==
Justice Souter authored a dissent, in which Justices Stevens, Ginsburg and Breyer joined.

The dissent was somewhat formalistic in its objections to the majority finding. It stated that the principle of stare decisis was of too great weight to overrule a previous decision so easily, and that the case presented appeared to be more of a re-hearing of Aguilar than a new proceeding. The Dissent cited the Supreme Court's guidelines surrounding rehearings, accusing the Court of veiling its decision as a "rethinking" instead of a reversal of Aguilar. The Dissent summarized its own position, remarking:

That cause lies in the maintenance of integrity in the interpretation of procedural rules, preservation of the responsive, non agenda setting character of this Court, and avoidance of invitations to reconsider old cases based on "speculat[ions] on chances from changes in [the Court's membership].

In short, the Dissent felt that the ruling in this case was contrary to the integrity and stability of the Court, and did not comport with the apolitical nature of the judiciary.

== See also ==
- List of United States Supreme Court cases, volume 521
- List of United States Supreme Court cases
- Lists of United States Supreme Court cases by volume
