= North Carolina v. Pearce =

- Supreme Court of the United States

Argued February 24, 1969 Decided June 23, 1969
- Full case name: State of North Carolina et al. v. Clifton A. Pearce v. William S. Rice
- Citations: 395 U.S. 711 (more) 89 S. Ct. 2072; 23 L. Ed. 2d 656

Case history
- Prior: In the first case, the United States District Court for the Middle District of Alabama, 274 F. Supp. 116 (M.D. Ala. 1967), granted writ and the warden appealed. The United States Court of Appeals for the Fifth Circuit, 396 F.2d 499 (5th Cir. 1968), affirmed and certiorari was granted. 393 U.S. 922, 89 S.Ct. 258, 21 L.Ed.2d 258. In the second case, the United States District Court for the Eastern District of North Carolina, at Raleigh, ordered the prisoner's release and appeal was taken. The United States Court of Appeals, 397 F.2d 253 (4th Cir. 1968), affirmed and certiorari was granted. 393 U.S. 932, 89 S.Ct. 292, 21 L.Ed.2d 268.
- Subsequent: limited by Alabama v. Smith, 490 U.S. 794, 109 S. Ct. 2201, 104 L. Ed. 2d 865 (1989)

Holding
- Trial court denied respondents' due process right by imposing a heavier sentence to punish respondent for having his original conviction set aside.

Court membership
- Chief Justice Earl Warren Associate Justices Hugo Black · William O. Douglas; John M. Harlan II · William J. Brennan Jr. Potter Stewart · Byron White; Thurgood Marshall

Case opinions
- Majority: Stewart, joined by Warren, Brennan
- Concurrence: Douglas, joined by Marshall
- Concurrence: White
- Concur/dissent: Black
- Concur/dissent: Harlan

Laws applied
- U.S. Const. amend. XIV; U.S. Const. amend. V
- Superseded by
- Alabama v. Smith

North Carolina v. Pearce, 395 U.S. 711 (1969), is a United States Supreme Court case that forbids judicial “vindictiveness” from playing a role in the increased sentence a defendant receives after a new trial. In sum, due process requires that a defendant be “free of apprehension” of judicial vindictiveness. Time served for a new conviction of the same offense must be “fully credited,” and a trial judge seeking to impose a greater sentence on retrial must affirmatively state the reasons for imposing such a sentence. The companion case, Simpson v. Rice, was identical except that the defendant initially pleaded guilty and received only one trial after withdrawing that plea. Simpson was later overruled in Alabama v. Smith.

== Background ==
The United States Supreme Court considered two respondents’ writs for habeas corpus in their decision. The first respondent, Pearce, was convicted of assault with intent to rape and sentenced to twelve to fifteen years. His first conviction was reversed in a state court proceeding because his involuntary confession was improperly admitted in his first trial. On retrial, he was convicted and sentenced to an eight-year prison term. Both the state and Pearce agreed that this sentence, combined with his previous time served, amounted to a harsher sentence than he had originally received. His conviction was affirmed on appeal to the Supreme Court of North Carolina. Pearce then brought a habeas proceeding in federal court, and the federal district court as well as the Court of Appeals for the Fourth Circuit both declared that Pearce's new sentence was “unconstitutional and void.” When the state failed to resentence him after sixty days, the federal court ordered Pearce to be released. At this point, the Supreme Court granted certiorari.

The second respondent, Rice, pleaded guilty to four counts of second-degree burglary, and he was sentenced to ten years in prison. The judgment was set aside in a state court proceeding two and a half years later, after Rice successfully argued his constitutional right to counsel was violated at trial. He was retried in Alabama state court, convicted, and sentenced to twenty five years in prison, with no credit given for the time he had already served. In his habeas corpus petition, the federal district court and Court of Appeals for the Fifth Circuit declared that the increased sentence was a violation of due process and “unconstitutional.” The Supreme Court granted certiorari.

== Majority opinion ==
Justice Potter Stewart delivered the majority opinion for the Court, answering the question “[w]hen at the behest of the defendant a criminal conviction has been set aside and a new trial ordered, to what extent does the Constitution limit the imposition of a harsher sentence after conviction upon retrial?” The Court broke this question into two issues: (i) whether the Constitution requires credit for time already served and (ii) whether the Constitution limits imposing a more severe sentence upon retrial.

The Court quickly dealt with the first issue, and it determined that time previously served must be credited upon resentencing because the Double Jeopardy Clause of the Fifth Amendment prohibits “multiple punishments” for the same offense.

Turning to the second issue regarding the constitutional limits of increased sentences upon reconviction, the Court found that neither the Double Jeopardy Clause of the Fifth Amendment nor the Equal Protection Clause of the Fourteenth Amendment precludes a trial judge from increasing a sentence upon reconviction. Since a trial judge is not “constitutionally precluded…from imposing a new sentence, whether greater or less than the original sentence,” the trial court is free to consider issues that have emerged after the original trial that have “thrown new light upon the defendant's ‘life, health, habits, conduct, and mental and moral propensities.’” As a result, the Court did not impose “an absolute constitutional bar” to an increased sentence upon retrial, since these considerations may properly justify an increased sentence. Nonetheless, the Court held that the Due Process Clause of the Fourteenth Amendment imposes limits on the trial judge's ability to increase sentences. The Court reasoned that it would be a “flagrant violation” of due process for a state court to follow a policy of increasing sentences upon every reconvicted defendant, and it would be a violation of due process for trial courts to impose that type of punishment on defendants who successfully exercise their constitutional rights. The Court further extended this protection to a defendant who prevails on statutory (rather than constitutional) claims, to ensure that a defendant who exercises his right of appeal "be free and unfettered.” Thus, vindictiveness, or choosing to punish a defendant who exercises his right to appeal, must not be considered when a judge imposes a new sentence.

To ensure that vindictiveness does not play a role in sentencing, the Court required for a judge to affirmatively state his justification for an increased sentence. A trial judge must base his reasoning on “objective information concerning identifiable conduct on the part of the defendant occurring after the time of the original sentencing proceeding.” This “factual data” must be made part of the record so it can be reviewed on appeal. Because both of the state courts for Rice and Pearce imposed more severe sentences without providing such affirmative justifications.

== Concurring opinion ==
Justice William O. Douglas, joined by Justice Thurgood Marshall, concurred in the judgment and agreed with the majority's due process analysis. Both Justices, however, went further than the majority. They would have held that “if for any reason a new trial is granted and there is a conviction a second time, the second penalty imposed cannot exceed the first penalty, if respect is had for the guarantee against double jeopardy.”

Justice Byron White concurred in part, but he would have allowed an increased sentence based on any “objective, identifiable data not known to the trial judge” at the original sentencing.

== Concurring and dissenting ==
Justice Hugo Black agreed with the majority that Rice's increased sentence indicated that the state trial judge was motivated by a desire to punish Rice for appealing his original trial decision. However, Justice Black disagreed that any evidence indicated that Pearce's sentence was motivated by vindictiveness. He was particularly concerned with the majority's requirement that a trial judge affirmatively state the reasons for an increased sentence. While he argued that impermissible motivations for increased trial sentences (such as in Rice's case) are unconstitutional, he disagreed that it is the role of the Court—instead of the legislature—to impose a specific remedy of requiring a judge to affirmatively state his reasoning for justifying an increased sentence.

Justice John Marshall Harlan II agreed with the majority's reasoning as it applied to the Fourteenth Amendment. However, he dissented as to the reasoning of the Court because he disagreed with the holding in Benton v. Maryland, 395 U.S. 784 (1969), which holds that the Double Jeopardy Clause of the Fifth Amendment applies to the states through the Fourteenth Amendment.

== Aftermath ==
About twenty years after Pearce was decided, in Alabama v. Smith, the Court overruled Simpson v. Rice (the companion case with a guilty plea) on the basis that the guilty plea distinguished it from the second trial in Pearce. As a result, current jurisprudence treats Pearce as implicitly overruled as well, and interprets the holding to provide a defendant with a “rebuttable presumption of vindictiveness.” This doctrine of a rebuttable presumption of vindictiveness, absent an affirmative indication of objective facts justifying an increased sentence, is referred to as the Pearce Principle.
