= Complete Auto Transit, Inc. v. Brady =

- Supreme Court of the United States

Argued January 19, 1977 Decided March 7, 1977
- Full case name: Complete Auto Transit, Inc. v. Brady, Chairman, Mississippi Tax Commission
- Citations: 430 U.S. 274 (more) 97 S. Ct. 1076; 51 L. Ed. 2d 326; 1977 U.S. LEXIS 56

Case history
- Prior: Certiorari from the Supreme Court of Mississippi, 330 So. 2d 268 (Miss. 1976).
- Subsequent: Rehearing denied, 430 U.S. 976 (1977).

Holding
- A privilege tax, when used in conjunction with the "four-prong" test, does not discourage interstate commerce.

Court membership
- Chief Justice Warren E. Burger Associate Justices William J. Brennan Jr. · Potter Stewart; Byron White · Thurgood Marshall; Harry Blackmun · Lewis F. Powell Jr. William Rehnquist · John P. Stevens

Case opinion
- Majority: Blackmun, joined by unanimous

Laws applied
- U.S. Const. art. I, § 8
- This case overturned a previous ruling or rulings
- Spector Motor Service v. O'Connor, 340 U.S. 602 (1951)

Complete Auto Transit, Inc. v. Brady, 430 U.S. 274 (1977), is a United States Supreme Court case regarding the Commerce Clause and sales tax.

== Background ==
Complete Auto was a Michigan-based auto transporter involved in moving General Motors vehicles from the railhead at Jackson, Mississippi to dealerships in Mississippi. The vehicles were assembled outside Mississippi.

The Mississippi State Tax Commission levied a tax upon Complete Auto "for the privilege of engaging or continuing in business or doing business" in the state of Mississippi. The Court refers to the tax as a "sales tax"; however, it was a "transaction privilege" or gross receipts tax based on Complete Auto's gross receipts.

Complete Auto paid the taxes of $122,160.59 under protest, and then undertook a refund action in the Chancery Court of the First Judicial District of Hinds County. Complete Auto claimed that its transportation was but one part of an interstate movement, and that the taxes assessed and paid were unconstitutional as applied to operations in interstate commerce. The Chancery Court, in an unreported opinion, sustained the assessments.

Complete Auto appealed to the Mississippi Supreme Court. The Court unanimously affirmed and concluded:

It will be noted that Taxpayer has a large operation in this State. It is dependent upon the State for police protection and other State services the same as other citizens. It should pay its fair share of taxes so long, but only so long, as the tax does not discriminate against interstate commerce, and there is no danger of interstate commerce being smothered by cumulative taxes of several states. There is no possibility of any other state duplicating the tax involved in this case.

=== Arguments ===
Complete Auto argued against the constitutionality of tax, stating that they were part of an interstate operation, involved in transporting vehicles from the factories in Michigan to the dealers in Mississippi. According to Complete Auto, taxation on interstate operations not only discourages interstate commerce but also is a violation of the Commerce Clause.

== Ruling ==
The Supreme Court ruled in favor of Mississippi. The ruling established a four-prong test for constitutionality of a tax under the Commerce Clause:

- Substantial nexus - connection between a state and a potential taxpayer clear enough to impose a tax.
- Nondiscrimination - interstate and intrastate taxes should not favor one over the other.
- Fair apportionment - taxation of only the apportionment of activity that transpires within the taxing jurisdiction.
- Fair relationship to services provided by the state - company enjoys services such as police protection while in a state.

Even though Complete Auto asserted that it was a part of an interstate operation, the Court agreed with Mississippi that while operating within the state, it was afforded services, such as police protection, provided for by taxation.

== Subsequent developments ==
The test enunciated in Complete Auto Transit received significant interpretation in Commonwealth Edison Co. v. Montana, 453 U.S. 609 (1981).
