= List of United States Supreme Court cases involving the First Amendment =

This is a list of cases that appeared before the Supreme Court of the United States involving the First Amendment to the United States Constitution.

== The establishment of religion ==
=== Blue laws ===
- McGowan v. Maryland (1961)
- Braunfeld v. Brown (1961)
- Gallagher v. Crown Kosher Super Market of Mass., Inc. (1961)
- Thornton v. Caldor (1985)

=== Government aid to church-related schools ===
- Cochran v. Louisiana State Board of Education, 281 U.S. 370 (1930)
- Everson v. Board of Education, 330 U.S. 1 (1947)
- Board of Ed. of Central School Dist. No. 1 v. Allen, 392 U.S. 236 (1968)
- Lemon v. Kurtzman, 403 U.S. 602 (1971)
- Tilton v. Richardson, 403 U.S. 672 (1971)
- Lemon v. Kurtzman II, 411 U.S. 192 (1973)
- Levitt v. Committee for Public Education and Religious Liberty, 413 U.S. 472 (1973)
- Hunt v. McNair, 413 U.S. 734 (1973)
- Committee for Public Education and Religious Liberty v. Nyquist, 413 U.S. 756 (1973)
- Sloan v. Lemon, 413 U.S. 825 (1973)
- Wheeler v. Barrera, 417 U.S. 402 (1974)
- Public Funds for Public Schools v. Marburger (1974)
- Meek v. Pittenger, 421 U.S. 349 (1975)
- Roemer v. Board of Public Works of Maryland, 426 U.S. 736 (1976)
- Wolman v. Walter, 433 U.S. 229 (1977)
- New York v. Cathedral Academy, 434 U.S. 125 (1977)
- Committee for Public Education and Religious Liberty v. Regan, 444 U.S. 646 (1980)
- Mueller v. Allen, 463 U.S. 388 (1983)
- School Dist. of Grand Rapids v. Ball, 473 U.S. 373 (1985)
- Aguilar v. Felton, 473 U.S. 402 (1985)
- Witters v. Washington Department of Services for the Blind, 474 U.S. 481 (1986)
- Zobrest v. Catalina Foothills School District, 509 U.S. 1 (1993)
- Board of Education of Kiryas Joel Village School District v. Grumet, 512 U.S. 687 (1994)
- Agostini v. Felton, 521 U.S. 203 (1997)
- Mitchell v. Helms, 530 U.S. 793 (2000)
- Zelman v. Simmons-Harris, 536 U.S. 639 (2002)
- Locke v. Davey, 540 U.S. 712 (2004)
- Arizona Christian School Tuition Organization v. Winn, 563 U.S. 125 (2011)
- Espinoza v. Montana Department of Revenue, 591 U.S. 125 (2020)

=== Government-sponsored religious displays ===
- Lynch v. Donnelly, 465 U.S. 668 (1984)
- Board of Trustees of Scarsdale v. McCreary, 471 U.S. 83 (1985)
- County of Allegheny v. American Civil Liberties Union, 492 U.S. 573 (1989)
- Van Orden v. Perry, 545 U.S. 677 (2005)
- McCreary County v. American Civil Liberties Union, 545 U.S. 844 (2005)
- Pleasant Grove City v. Summum, 555 U.S. 460 (2009)
- Salazar v. Buono, 559 U.S. 700 (2010)
- American Legion v. American Humanist Association, No. 17-1717, 588 U.S. 29 (2019)

==== Legislative prayer ====
- Marsh v. Chambers, 463 U.S. 783 (1984)
- Town of Greece v. Galloway, 572 U.S. 565 (2014)

=== Internal religious affairs (also involving the Free Exercise Clause) ===
- Watson v. Jones, 80 U.S. (13 Wall.) 679 (1872)
- United States v. Ballard, 322 U.S. 78 (1944)
- Kedroff v. St. Nicholas Cathedral of Russian Orthodox Church in North America, 344 U.S. 94 (1952)
- Kreshik v. St. Nicholas Cathedral, 363 U.S. 190 (1960)
- Presbyterian Church v. Hull Church, 393 U.S. 440 (1969)
- Serbian Eastern Orthodox Diocese for the United States of America & Canada v. Milivojevich, 426 U.S. 696 (1976)
- Jones v. Wolf, 443 U.S. 595 (1979)
- Roman Catholic Archdiocese of San Juan v. Acevedo Feliciano, No. 18-921, 589 U.S. 57 (2020)

==== Ministerial exception ====
- Hosanna-Tabor Evangelical Lutheran Church & School v. Equal Employment Opportunity Commission, 565 U.S. 171 (2012)
- Our Lady of Guadalupe School v. Morrissey-Berru, No. 19-267, 591 U.S. 732 (2020)

=== Private religious speech ===
- Lamb's Chapel v. Center Moriches Union Free School District, 508 U.S. 384 (1993)
- Capitol Square Review & Advisory Board v. Pinette, 515 U.S. 753 (1995)
- Rosenberger v. University of Virginia, 515 U.S. 819 (1995)
- Good News Club v. Milford Central School, 533 U.S. 98 (2001)
- Shurtleff v. City of Boston, No. 20-1800, 596 U.S. 243 (2022)

=== Religion in public schools ===
- McCollum v. Board of Education, 333 U.S. 203 (1948)
- Zorach v. Clauson, 343 U.S. 306 (1952)
- Engel v. Vitale, 370 U.S. 421 (1962)
- Abington School District v. Schempp, 374 U.S. 203 (1963)
- Epperson v. Arkansas, 393 U.S. 97 (1968)
- Stone v. Graham, 449 U.S. 39 (1980)
- Wallace v. Jaffree, 472 U.S. 38 (1985)
- Edwards v. Aguillard, 482 U.S. 578 (1987)
- Westside Community Board of Education v. Mergens, 496 U.S. 226 (1990)
- Lee v. Weisman, 505 U.S. 577 (1992)
- Santa Fe Independent School District v. Doe, 530 U.S. 290 (2000)
- Elk Grove Unified School District v. Newdow, 542 U.S. 1 (2004)
- Kennedy v. Bremerton School District, No. 21-418, 597 U.S. 507 (2022)

=== Religious institution functioning as a government agency ===
- Larkin v. Grendel's Den, Inc., 459 U.S. 116 (1982)
- Board of Education of Kiryas Joel Village School District v. Grumet, 512 U.S. 687 (1994)

=== Standing to sue ===
- Flast v. Cohen, 392 U.S. 83 (1968)
- Valley Forge Christian College v. Americans United for Separation of Church & State, 454 U.S. 464 (1982)
- Hein v. Freedom From Religion Foundation, 551 U.S. 587 (2007)
- Arizona Christian School Tuition Organization v. Winn, 563 U.S. 125 (2011)

=== Statutory religious exemptions ===
- Walz v. Tax Commission of the City of New York, 397 U.S. 664 (1970)
- Bob Jones University v. United States, 461 U.S. 574 (1983)
- Estate of Thornton v. Caldor, Inc., 472 U.S. 703 (1985)
- Corporation of Presiding Bishop of Church of Jesus Christ of Latter-day Saints v. Amos, 483 U.S. 327 (1987)
- Texas Monthly, Inc. v. Bullock, 489 U.S. 1 (1989)
- City of Boerne v. Flores, 521 U.S. 507 (1997)
- Cutter v. Wilkinson, 544 U.S. 709 (2005)

=== Unequal government treatment of different religious groups ===
- Larson v. Valente, 456 U.S. 228 (1982)

=== Abortion and contraception ===
- Harris v. McRae, 448 U.S. 297 (1980)
- Bowen v. Kendrick, 487 U.S. 589 (1988)

=== Other ===
- Torcaso v. Watkins (1961)
- McDaniel v. Paty (1978)
- Trump v. Hawaii (2018)

== The free exercise of religion ==
=== Exclusion of religion from public benefits ===
- Locke v. Davey, 540 U.S. 712 (2004)
- Trinity Lutheran Church of Columbia, Inc. v. Comer, No. 15-577, 582 U.S. 449 (2017)
- Espinoza v. Montana Department of Revenue, No. 18-1195, 591 U.S. 464 (2020)
- Carson v. Makin, No. 20-1088, 596 U.S. 767 (2022)
- Oklahoma Statewide Charter School Board v. Drummond, No. 24-394, 605 U.S. 165 (2025)

=== Polygamy ===
- Reynolds v. United States (1878)
- Davis v. Beason (1890)

=== Free exercise and eminent domain ===
- Lyng v. Northwest Indian Cemetery Protective Association (1988)
- City of Boerne v. Flores (1997)

=== Free exercise and free speech ===
- R. A. V. v. City of St. Paul (1992)
- Good News Club v. Milford Central School (2001)
- Gonzales v. O Centro Espirita Beneficente Uniao do Vegetal (2006)
- Fulton v. City of Philadelphia (2021)

=== Free exercise and public education ===
- Wisconsin v. Yoder (1972)
- Widmar v. Vincent (1981)
- Westside Community Board of Education v. Mergens (1990)
- Lamb's Chapel v. Center Moriches Union Free School District (1993)
- Rosenberger v. Rector and Visitors of the University of Virginia (1995)
- Kennedy v. Bremerton School District, No. 21-418, 597 U.S. 507 (2022)

=== Free exercise and public property ===
- Capitol Square Review and Advisory Board v. Pinette (1995)

=== Internal religious affairs (also involving the Establishment Clause) ===
- Watson v. Jones, 80 U.S. (13 Wall.) 679 (1872)
- United States v. Ballard, 322 U.S. 78 (1944)
- Kedroff v. St. Nicholas Cathedral of Russian Orthodox Church in North America, 344 U.S. 94 (1952)
- Kreshik v. St. Nicholas Cathedral, 363 U.S. 190 (1960)
- Presbyterian Church v. Hull Church, 393 U.S. 440 (1969)
- Serbian Eastern Orthodox Diocese for the United States of America & Canada v. Milivojevich, 426 U.S. 696 (1976)
- Jones v. Wolf, 443 U.S. 595 (1979)
- Roman Catholic Archdiocese of San Juan v. Acevedo Feliciano, No. 18-921, 589 U.S. 57 (2020)

==== Ministerial exception ====
- Hosanna-Tabor Evangelical Lutheran Church & School v. Equal Employment Opportunity Commission, 565 U.S. 171 (2012)
- Our Lady of Guadalupe School v. Morrissey-Berru, No. 19-267, 591 U.S. 732 (2020)

=== Religion and the right to work ===
- Sherbert v. Verner (1963)
- Trans World Airlines v. Hardison (1977)
- Ohio Civil Rights Commission v. Dayton Christian Schools (1986)
- Corporation of Presiding Bishop of Church of Jesus Christ of Latter-day Saints v. Amos (1987)
- Employment Division v. Smith (1990)

=== Religious tests for public service or benefits ===
- Torcaso v. Watkins (1961)
- McDaniel v. Paty (1978)
- Thomas v. Review Board of the Indiana Employment Security Division (1981)
- Goldman v. Weinberger (1986)
- Bowen v. Roy (1986)

=== Ritual sacrifice of animals ===
- Church of Lukumi Babalu Aye v. City of Hialeah (1993)

=== Solicitation by religious groups ===
- Cantwell v. Connecticut (1940)
- Minersville School District v. Gobitis (1940)
- Cox v. New Hampshire (1941)
- Jones v. City of Opelika (I) (1942)
- Marsh v. Alabama (1942)
- Murdock v. Pennsylvania (1943)
- Jones v. City of Opelika (II) (1943)
- West Virginia State Board of Education v. Barnette (1943)
- Prince v. Massachusetts (1944)
- Heffron v. International Society for Krishna Consciousness (1981)
- Watchtower Society v. Village of Stratton (2002)

=== Statutory religious exemptions ===
==== Religious Freedom Restoration Act ====
- Gonzales v. O Centro Espírita Beneficente União do Vegetal, 546 U.S. 418 (2006)
- Burwell v. Hobby Lobby Stores, Inc., 573 U.S. 682 (2014)
- Zubik v. Burwell, No. 14-1418, 578 U.S. 403 (2016)
- Little Sisters of the Poor Saints Peter and Paul Home v. Pennsylvania, No. 19-431, 591 U.S. ___ (2020)
- Tanzin v. Tanvir, No. 19-71, 592 U.S. 43 (2020)

==== Religious Land Use and Institutionalized Persons Act ====
- Sossamon v. Texas, 563 U.S. 277 (2011)
- Holt v. Hobbs, 574 U.S. 352 (2015)
- Ramirez v. Collier, No. 21-5592, 595 U.S. 411 (2022)

=== Other ===
- Sause v. Bauer, No. 17-742, 585 U.S. 957 (2018)
- Roman Catholic Diocese of Brooklyn v. Cuomo (2020)
- Tandon v. Newsom (2021)

== Freedom of speech ==
=== Campaign finance ===
- Buckley v. Valeo, 424 U.S. 1 (1976)
- First National Bank of Boston v. Bellotti, 435 U.S. 765 (1978)
- California Medical Association v. FEC, 453 U.S. 182 (1981)
- Citizens Against Rent Control v. City of Berkeley, 454 U.S. 290 (1981)
- FEC v. National Right to Work Committee, 459 U.S. 197 (1982)
- FEC v. National Conservative PAC, 470 U.S. 480 (1985)
- FEC v. Massachusetts Citizens for Life, 479 U.S. 238 (1986)
- Eu v. S.F. Cty. Democratic Cent. Comm., 489 U.S. 214 (1989)
- Austin v. Michigan Chamber of Commerce, 494 U.S. 652 (1990)
- Colorado Republican Federal Campaign Committee v. FEC, 518 U.S. 604 (1996)
- Nixon v. Shrink Missouri Government PAC, 528 U.S. 377 (2000)
- FEC v. Colorado Republican Federal Campaign Committee, 533 U.S. 431 (2001)
- Republican Party of Minnesota v. White, 536 U.S. 765 (2002)
- FEC v. Beaumont, 539 U.S. 146 (2003)
- McConnell v. FEC, 540 U.S. 93 (2003)
- Wisconsin Right to Life, Inc. v. FEC, 546 U.S. 410 (2006)
- Randall v. Sorrell, 548 U.S. 230 (2006)
- FEC v. Wisconsin Right to Life, Inc., 551 U.S. 449 (2007)
- Davis v. FEC, 554 U.S. 724 (2008)
- Citizens United v. FEC, 558 U.S. 310 (2010)
- Arizona Free Enterprise Club's Freedom Club PAC v. Bennett, 564 U.S. 721 (2011)
- American Tradition Partnership, Inc. v. Bullock, 567 U.S. 516 (2012)
- McCutcheon v. FEC, 572 U.S. 185 (2014)
- Williams-Yulee v. Florida Bar, No. 13-1499, 575 U.S. 433 (2015)
- Thompson v. Hebdon, No. 19-122, 589 U.S. 1 (2019)
- FEC v. Ted Cruz for Senate, No. 21-12, 596 U.S. 289 (2022)

=== Commercial speech ===
- Valentine v. Chrestensen (1942)
- Rowan v. U.S. Post Office Dept. (1970)
- Pittsburgh Press Co. v. Pittsburgh Commission on Human Relations (1973)
- Lehman v. Shaker Heights (1974)
- Bigelow v. Commonwealth of Virginia (1974)
- Virginia State Pharmacy Board v. Virginia Citizens Consumer Council (1976)
- Bates v. State Bar of Arizona (1977)
- Linmark Associates, Inc. v. Willingboro (1977)
- Ohralik v. Ohio State Bar Assn. (1978)
- Friedman v. Rogers (1979)
- Central Hudson Gas & Electric Corp. v. Public Service Commission (1980)
- Consol. Edison Co. v. Public Serv. Comm'n (1980)
- Metromedia, Inc. v. San Diego (1981)
- Hoffman Estates v. The Flipside, Hoffman Estates, Inc. (1982)
- Bolger v. Youngs Drug Products Corp. (1983)
- Edenfield v. Fane (1993)
- 44 Liquormart, Inc. v. Rhode Island (1996)
- Expressions Hair Design v. Schneiderman (2017)
- Iancu v. Brunetti (2019)

=== Compelled speech ===
- Minersville School District v. Gobitis (1940)
- West Virginia State Board of Education v. Barnette (1943)
- Miami Herald Publishing Co. v. Tornillo (1974)
- Wooley v. Maynard (1977)
- Agency for International Development v. Alliance for Open Society (2013)
- National Institute of Family and Life Advocates v. Becerra (2018)
- Agency for International Development v. Alliance for Open Society (2020)
- 303 Creative LLC v. Elenis (2023)

==== Compelled commercial speech ====
- Zauderer v. Office of Disciplinary Counsel of Supreme Court of Ohio (1985)
- Riley v. National Federation of the Blind (1988)
- Ibanez v. Florida Department of Business and Professional Regulation, Board of Accountancy (1994)
- Milavetz, Gallop & Milavetz, P.A. v. United States (2010)
- Expressions Hair Design v. Schneiderman (2017)

==== Compelled subsidy for speech of others ====
Cases that consider the First Amendment implications of payments mandated by the state going to use in part for speech by third parties

- Abood v. Detroit Board of Education (1977)
- Communications Workers of America v. Beck (1978)
- Chicago Local Teachers Union v. Hudson (1986)
- Keller v. State Bar of California (1990)
- Lehnert v. Ferris Faculty Ass'n (1991)
- Glickman v. Wileman Brothers & Elliott Inc. (1997)
- Board of Regents of the University of Wisconsin System v. Southworth (2000)
- United States v. United Foods, Inc. (2001)
- Johanns v. Livestock Marketing Association (2005)
- Davenport v. Washington Education Association (2007)
- Locke v. Karass (2008)
- Knox v. Service Employees International Union, Local 1000 (2012)
- Harris v. Quinn (2014)
- Friedrichs v. California Teachers Ass'n (2016)
- Janus v. AFSCME (2018)

==== Loyalty oaths and affirmations ====
- American Communications Association v. Douds (1950)
- Garner v. Board of Public Works (1951)
- Adler v. Board of Ed. of City of New York (1952)
- Wieman v. Updegraff (1952)
- Speiser v. Randall (1958)
- Cramp v. Board of Public Instruction (1961)
- Keyishian v. Board of Regents (1965)
- Communist Party of Indiana v. Whitcomb (1974)

=== Content-based ===
- R. A. V. v. City of St. Paul (1992)
- Reed v. Town of Gilbert (2015)
- City of Austin v. Reagan National Advertising of Austin, LLC (2022)

=== Content-neutral ===
- City of Ladue v. Gilleo (1994)

=== Sedition and imminent danger ===
- Debs v. United States (1919)
- Schenck v. United States (1919)
- Abrams v. United States (1919)
- Gitlow v. New York (1925)
- Whitney v. California (1927)
- Dennis v. United States (1951)
- Communist Party v. Subversive Activities Control Board (1955)
- Yates v. United States (1957)
- Brandenburg v. Ohio (1969)

=== False speech ===
- United States v. Alvarez (2012)
- Susan B. Anthony List v. Driehaus (2014)

=== Fighting words and the heckler's veto ===
- Cantwell v. Connecticut (1940)
- Chaplinsky v. New Hampshire (1942)
- Terminiello v. Chicago (1949)
- Feiner v. New York (1951)
- National Socialist Party of America v. Village of Skokie (1977)
- R. A. V. v. City of St. Paul (1992)
- Snyder v. Phelps (2011)
- Counterman v. Colorado (2023)

=== Freedom of assembly and public forums ===
- Hague v. CIO (1939)
- Schneider v. New Jersey (1939)
- Martin v. Struthers (1943)
- NAACP v. Alabama (1958)
- Bates v. City of Little Rock (1960)
- Edwards v. South Carolina (1963)
- Cox v. Louisiana (1965)
- Brown v. Louisiana (1966)
- Adderley v. Florida (1966)
- Carroll v. Town of Princess Anne (1968)
- Coates v. Cincinnati (1971)
- Organization for a Better Austin v. Keefe (1971)
- Southeastern Promotions, Ltd. v. Conrad (1975)
- Pruneyard Shopping Center v. Robins (1980)
- Postal Service v. Council of Greenburgh Civic Assns. (1981)
- Christian Legal Society v. Martinez (2010)
- Manhattan Community Access Corp. v. Halleck (2019)
- Americans for Prosperity Foundation v. Bonta (2021)

==== Time, place and manner ====
Cases concerning restrictions on the time, place, and manner of speech

- Chicago Police Dept. v. Mosley (1972)
- Grayned v. City of Rockford (1972)
- Ward v. Rock Against Racism (1989)
- Schenck v. Pro-Choice Network of Western New York (1997)
- Hill v. Colorado (2000)
- McCullen v. Coakley (2014)
- Minnesota Voters Alliance v. Mansky (2018)

=== Government speech ===
Cases pertaining to whether or not extending protections to speech constitutes government endorsement of speech.

- Pleasant Grove City v. Summum, 555 U.S. 460 (2009)
- Walker v. Texas Division, Sons of Confederate Veterans (2015)
- Matal v. Tam (2017)
- Iancu v. Brunetti (2019)
- Shurtleff v. City of Boston, No. 20-1800, 596 U.S. 243 (2022)

=== Government-subsidized speech ===
Cases about restrictions on speech by third parties funded by the government.

- Rust v. Sullivan (1991)
- Legal Services Corp. v. Velazquez (2001)

=== Obscenity ===
==== Generally ====
Cases concerned with the definition of obscenity and whether a particular work or type of material is obscene.

- Roth v. United States (1957)
- Alberts v. California, (1957)
- One, Inc. v. Olesen, (1958)
- MANual Enterprises v. Day, (1962)
- Jacobellis v. Ohio (1964)
- Memoirs v. Massachusetts, (1966)
- Kois v. Wisconsin (1972)
- Miller v. California (1973)
- Jenkins v. Georgia (1974)
- New York v. Ferber (1982)
- Osborne v. Ohio (1990)
- United States v. Stevens (2010)

==== As criminal offense ====
Appeals of criminal convictions for possessing, selling or distributing obscenity that focused on that issue

- Rosen v. United States (1896)
- Butler v. Michigan (1957)
- Smith v. California, (1959)
- Ginzburg v. United States, (1966)
- Mishkin v. New York, (1966)
- Redrup v. New York (1967)
- Ginsberg v. New York (1968)
- Stanley v. Georgia (1969)
- Blount v. Rizzi (1971)
- United States v. Reidel (1971)
- Heller v. New York (1973)
- United States v. Orito (1973)
- Erznoznik v. City of Jacksonville (1975)
- United States v. X-Citement Video (1994)

==== Search, seizure and forfeiture ====
Cases involving the search and seizure of allegedly obscene material

- Marcus v. Search Warrant, (1961)
- Quantity of Books v. Kansas (1964)
- Lee Art Theatre, Inc. v. Virginia (1968)
- United States v. Thirty-seven Photographs (1971)
- United States v. 12 200-ft. Reels of Film (1973)
- Roaden v. Kentucky (1973)
- Lo-Ji Sales, Inc., v. New York (1979)
- Maryland v. Macon (1985)
- New York v. P.J. Video, Inc. (1986)

==== Civil and administrative regulation ====
Cases dealing with civil and administrative regulatory procedures aimed at suppressing or restricting obscenity, such as film-licensing boards or zoning regulations.

- Mutual Film Corp. v. Industrial Commission of Ohio (1915)
- Joseph Burstyn, Inc. v. Wilson (1952)
- Kingsley Books, Inc. v. Brown (1957)
- Kingsley Int'l Pictures Corp. v. Regents of Univ. of N. Y. (1959)
- Times Film Corp. v. Chicago (1961)
- Bantam Books v. Sullivan (1963)
- Freedman v. Maryland (1965)
- Paris Adult Theatre I v. Slaton (1973)
- Young v. American Mini Theatres (1976)
- Renton v. Playtime Theatres, Inc. (1986)
- United States v. Playboy Entertainment Group (2000)

==== Internet ====
Cases involving laws meant to restrict obscenity online

- Reno v. American Civil Liberties Union (1997)
- Ashcroft v. American Civil Liberties Union (2002)
- Ashcroft v. Free Speech Coalition (2002)

=== Public employees ===
- Pickering v. Board of Education (1968)
- Board of Regents of State Colleges v. Roth (1972)
- Perry v. Sindermann (1972)
- Arnett v. Kennedy (1974)
- Parker v. Levy (1974)
- Madison School District v. Wisconsin Employment Relations Commission (1976)
- Mt. Healthy City School District Board of Education v. Doyle (1977)
- Givhan v. Western Line Consolidated School District (1979)
- Snepp v. United States (1980)
- Connick v. Myers (1983)
- Rankin v. McPherson (1987)
- Waters v. Churchill (1994)
- United States v. National Treasury Employees Union (1995)
- Board of Commissioners, Wabaunsee County v. Umbehr, (1996)
- San Diego v. Roe (2004)
- Garcetti v. Ceballos (2007)
- Borough of Duryea v. Guarnieri (2011)
- Lane v. Franks (2014)
- Heffernan v. City of Paterson (2016)
- Houston Community College System v. Wilson, No. 20-804, 595 U.S. 468 (2022)

==== Political activity and Hatch Act of 1939 ====
- Ex parte Curtis (1882)
- United Public Workers v. Mitchell (1947)
- United States Civil Service Commission v. National Association of Letter Carriers (1973)
- Broadrick v. Oklahoma (1973)
- Elrod v. Burns (1976)
- Branti v. Finkel (1979)

=== Public school students ===
Speech by students in public secondary schools

- Tinker v. Des Moines Independent Community School District (1969)
- Healy v. James (1972)
- Board of Education v. Pico (1982)
- Bethel School District No. 403 v. Fraser (1986)
- Hazelwood School District v. Kuhlmeier (1988)
- Morse v. Frederick (2007)
- Mahanoy Area School District v. B.L. (2021)

=== Retaliation by public officials ===
Cases in which it has been alleged governmental officials retaliated for protected speech made by private citizens who are not employed by said officials.

- Bridges v. California (1941)
- Pennekamp v. Florida (1946)
- Wood v. Georgia (1962)
- Haig v. Agee (1981)
- Gentile v. State Bar of Nevada (1991)
- Lozman v. City of Riviera Beach (2018)
- Nieves v. Bartlett (2019)

=== Symbolic speech ===
- United States v. O'Brien (1968)
- Cohen v. California (1971)
- Smith v. Goguen (1974)
- Texas v. Johnson (1989)
- United States v. Eichman (1990)
- City of Erie v. Pap's A.M. (2000)
- Virginia v. Black (2003)

== Freedom of the press ==
=== Broadcast media ===
- Red Lion Broadcasting Co. v. FCC (1968)
- CBS v. Democratic National Committee (1973)
- FCC v. League of Women Voters of California (1984)
- FCC v. Pacifica Foundation (1989)
- Turner Broadcasting v. FCC (1995)
- Bartnicki v. Vopper 532 U.S. 514 (2001)
- FCC v. Fox Television Stations, Inc. I (2009)
- FCC v. Fox Television Stations, Inc. II (2012)

=== Defamation ===
- Beauharnais v. Illinois (1952)
- New York Times Co. v. Sullivan (1964)
- Garrison v. Louisiana (1964)
- Curtis Publishing Co. v. Butts (1967)
- St. Amant v. Thompson (1968)
- Gertz v. Robert Welch, Inc. (1974)
- Time, Inc. v. Firestone (1976)
- Bose Corp. v. Consumers Union of United States, Inc. (1981)
- Dun & Bradstreet, Inc. v. Greenmoss Builders, Inc. (1985)
- McDonald v. Smith (1985)
- Hustler Magazine v. Falwell (1988)
- Milkovich v. Lorain Journal Co. (1990)
- Air Wisconsin Airlines Corp. v. Hoeper (2014)

=== Prior restraints and censorship ===
- Near v. Minnesota (1931)
- Lovell v. City of Griffin (1938)
- Brandenburg v. Ohio (1969)
- New York Times Co. v. United States (1971)
- Nebraska Press Assn. v. Stuart (1976)
- Houchins v. KQED, Inc. (1978)
- Tory v. Cochran (2005)
- Citizens United v. FEC (2010)

=== Privacy ===
- Time, Inc. v. Hill (1967)
- Cox Broadcasting Corp. v. Cohn (1975)
- Richmond Newspapers, Inc. v. Virginia (1980)
- Florida Star v. B. J. F. (1989)
- Wilson v. Layne (1999)

=== Search and seizure ===
- Zurcher v. Stanford Daily, (1978)

=== Taxation and privileges ===
- Grosjean v. American Press Co. (1936)
- Branzburg v. Hayes (1972)
- Minneapolis Star Tribune Company v. Commissioner (1983)

== Freedom of assembly ==
- United States v. Cruikshank, 92 U.S. 542 (1876)
- Presser v. Illinois, 116 U.S. 252 (1886)
- De Jonge v. Oregon, 299 U.S. 353 (1937)
- Thomas v. Collins, 323 U.S. 516 (1945)
- National Socialist Party of America v. Village of Skokie, 432 U.S. 43 (1977)

== Freedom of association ==
- Joint Anti-Fascist Refugee Committee v. McGrath (1951)
- Watkins v. United States (1957)
- Sweezy v. New Hampshire (1957)
- NAACP v. Alabama (1958)
- Bates v. City of Little Rock (1960)
- Shelton v. Tucker (1960)
- Gibson v. Florida Legislative Investigation Committee (1963)
- Eastland v. United States Servicemen's Fund (1975)
- Abood v. Detroit Board of Education (1977)
- In re Primus (1978)
- Roberts v. United States Jaycees (1984)
- Rotary International v. Rotary Club of Duarte, 481 U.S. 537 (1987)
- Hurley v. Irish-American Gay, Lesbian, and Bisexual Group of Boston (1995)
- Boy Scouts of America v. Dale (2000)
- California Democratic Party v. Jones (2000)
- Americans for Prosperity Foundation v. Bonta, No. 19-251, 594 U.S. 595 (2021)

== Freedom to petition ==
- United States v. Cruikshank (1876)
- Thomas v. Collins (1945)
- Eastern Railroad Presidents Conference v. Noerr Motor Freight, Inc. (1961)
- NAACP v. Button (1963)
- Edwards v. South Carolina (1963)
- United Mine Workers v. Pennington (1965)
- Cox v. Louisiana (1965)
- California Motor Transport Co. v. Trucking Unlimited (1972)
- Smith v. Arkansas State Highway Employees (1979)
- Feres v United States (1985)
- McDonald v. Smith (1985)
- Meyer v. Grant (1988)
- Buckley v. American Constitutional Law Foundation (1999)
- BE and K Construction Co. V. National Labor Relations Board (2002)
- Doe v. Reed (2010)
- Borough of Duryea v. Guarnieri (2011)

== See also ==
- List of United States Supreme Court cases involving the Fifth Amendment
