= McCullen v. Coakley =

- Supreme Court of the United States

Argued January 15, 2014 Decided June 26, 2014
- Full case name: Eleanor McCullen, et al., Petitioners v. Martha Coakley, Attorney General of Massachusetts, et al.
- Docket no.: 12-1168
- Citations: 573 U.S. 464 (more) 134 S. Ct. 2518; 189 L. Ed. 2d 502; 2014 U.S. LEXIS 4499
- Argument: Oral argument

Case history
- Prior: Statute upheld as to facial challenge, 573 F. Supp. 2d 382 (D. Mass. 2008); affirmed, 571 F.3d 167 (1st Cir. 2009); cert. denied, 130 S. Ct. 1881 (2010); statute upheld as to as applied challenge, 759 F. Supp. 2d 133 (D. Mass. 2010); affirmed, 708 F.3d 1 (1st Cir. 2013); cert. granted, 570 U.S. 916 (2013).

Holding
- The provisions of the Reproductive Health Care Facilities Act limiting protesting within 35 feet of an abortion clinic violate the Free Speech Clause of the First Amendment.

Court membership
- Chief Justice John Roberts Associate Justices Antonin Scalia · Anthony Kennedy; Clarence Thomas · Ruth Bader Ginsburg; Stephen Breyer · Samuel Alito; Sonia Sotomayor · Elena Kagan

Case opinions
- Majority: Roberts, joined by Ginsburg, Breyer, Sotomayor, Kagan
- Concurrence: Scalia (in judgment), joined by Kennedy, Thomas
- Concurrence: Alito (in judgment)

Laws applied
- U.S. Const. amend. I

McCullen v. Coakley, 573 U.S. 464 (2014), was a unanimous United States Supreme Court decision involving a First Amendment challenge to the validity of a Massachusetts law establishing 35-foot (11 m) fixed buffer zones around facilities where abortions were performed.

The law – part of the Reproductive Health Care Facilities Act – barred non-exempt individuals from entering or remaining "on a public way or sidewalk adjacent to a reproductive health care facility within a radius of 35 feet". The Court unanimously held that the law violated the First Amendment to the United States Constitution, as applied to Massachusetts through the Fourteenth Amendment.

== Background ==
In 1994, the United States Congress passed the Freedom of Access to Clinic Entrances Act, which, among other things, prohibited the use of physical force toward or physical obstruction of a person seeking to obtain or provide reproductive health services.

In 2000, Massachusetts passed the Reproductive Health Care Facilities Act, which was broadly modeled on laws upheld by the Supreme Court in Hill v. Colorado. The Massachusetts Reproductive Health Care Facilities Act was enacted in response to a history of confrontations, obstruction, and violence outside abortion clinics. Before the law, clinics experienced protests that sometimes blocked entrances, impeded access for patients and staff, and led to heated confrontations between abortion opponents and supporters.

The original 2000 Act sought to ensure that patients and clinic employees could safely enter and leave reproductive health care facilities. It prohibited obstructing access, physically interfering with people seeking or providing services, and other disruptive conduct. Massachusetts initially relied on these targeted restrictions rather than fixed buffer zones.

By 2007, however, the state concluded that these measures had not adequately addressed persistent congestion and confrontations at certain clinics. It therefore amended the Act to establish 35-foot fixed buffer zones around clinic entrances and driveways.

The amended Act was challenged by seven individuals who engaged in "sidewalk counseling" outside Planned Parenthood clinics in Boston, Worcester, and Springfield, Massachusetts under the First and Fourteenth Amendments.

The District Court rejected both of the petitioners' constitutional challenges, and the First Circuit affirmed. The First Circuit held that the Massachusetts buffer-zone law was a valid time, place, and manner restriction under Ward v. Rock Against Racism, concluding that it appropriately balanced the state's interests in public safety and access to abortion clinics with the petitioners' First Amendment rights.

== Opinion of the Court ==
Chief Justice John Roberts delivered the opinion of the Court, writing that: "The buffer zones burden substantially more speech than necessary to achieve [Massachusetts'] asserted interests." He stated that there were alternatives available to Massachusetts that "appear capable of serving its interests, without excluding individuals from areas historically open for speech and debate". Further, he stated:

Although respondents claim that Massachusetts 'tried other laws already on the books', they identify not a single prosecution brought under those laws within at least the last 17 years. And while they also claim that the Commonwealth 'tried injunctions', the last injunctions they cite date to the 1990s. In short, the Commonwealth has not shown that it seriously undertook to address the problem with less intrusive tools readily available to it. Nor has it shown that it considered different methods that other jurisdictions have found effective.

The Supreme Court applied the same First Amendment test as in Hill v. Colorado but reached a different result. It concluded that the state could instead rely on measures such as enforcing existing laws against harassment or obstruction, obtaining targeted injunctions, or using ordinary police powers.

The Court emphasized that public streets and sidewalks are traditional public forums entitled to the highest level of First Amendment protection. It explained that while people may encounter unwanted speech in these places, that is a feature rather than a flaw because the First Amendment protects "an uninhibited marketplace of ideas in which truth will ultimately prevail."

Justice Antonin Scalia (joined by his fellow Hill dissenters Justices Anthony Kennedy and Clarence Thomas) concurred in the judgment but disagreed with the reasons of the Chief Justice. In Scalia's view, the law was content-based, the Court should have applied strict scrutiny, and the law failed that stricter standard.

Justice Samuel Alito also filed an opinion concurring in the judgment, but disagreed with Roberts' opinion that the law was viewpoint-neutral. Alito considered that the law "blatantly discriminates based on viewpoint": a "sidewalk counselor" would not be permitted to enter the zone in order to approach a woman and criticize the clinic, but an employee of the clinic could approach the same woman to encourage her to come inside.

== See also ==
- List of United States Supreme Court cases involving the First Amendment
