= Serbian Orthodox Diocese v. Milivojevich =

- Supreme Court of the United States

Argued March 22, 1976 Decided June 21, 1976
- Full case name: Serbian Eastern Orthodox Diocese for the United States of America and Canada, et al. v. Dionisije Milivojevich, et al.
- Citations: 426 U.S. 696 (more) 96 S. Ct. 2372; 49 L. Ed. 2d 151; 1976 U.S. LEXIS 69

Case history
- Prior: 60 Ill. 2d 477, 328 N.E.2d 268 (1975)

Holding
- The United States Supreme Court overturned the decision of the Illinois Supreme Court declaring that the court had infringed upon the First Amendment and Fourteenth Amendment.

Court membership
- Chief Justice Warren E. Burger Associate Justices William J. Brennan Jr. · Potter Stewart; Byron White · Thurgood Marshall; Harry Blackmun · Lewis F. Powell Jr. William Rehnquist · John P. Stevens

Case opinions
- Majority: Brennan, joined by Stewart, White, Marshall, Blackmun, Powell
- Concurrence: White
- Concurrence: Burger
- Dissent: Rehnquist, joined by Stevens

Serbian Orthodox Diocese v. Milivojevich, 426 U.S. 696 (1976), is a United States Supreme Court case in which the Court held that lower courts violated the First Amendment and Fourteenth Amendments by intervening in an internal church dispute. The Court held that in matters of dispute within hierarchal religious organizations, the Establishment Clause precludes intervention by civil courts in internal disputes concerning church governance. Under the Establishment Clause, decisions imposed by hierarchal religious organizations are binding in civil courts.

== Background ==
Bishop Dionisije (Milivojevich) of the Serbian Eastern Orthodox Diocese of the United States and Canada was defrocked after being investigated for claims of misconduct. The mother church located in Belgrade, Yugoslavia made this decision and in doing so, also divided the American-Canadian contingent into three distinct dioceses. Bishop Dionsije sued the Mother Church and requested that the courts declare him the ‘true diocesan bishop’ of the undivided diocese.

The Illinois Supreme Court determined that the Mother Church was in violation of its own procedures, and internal regulations. The court further concluded that the diocese could not be divided. This finding rendered the church’s decision arbitrary and invalid. The United States Supreme Court reversed, holding that the lower courts violated the First Amendment by interpreting and drawing conclusions about church law.

The headquarters and home of the Serbian Eastern Orthodox Diocese at the time of this case was based in Belgrade, Yugoslavia. There are two governing bodies: The highest executive branch of the church is the Holy Synod. This branch includes the Patriarch and four diocesan bishops elected by the Holy Assembly. The Holy Assembly possesses the legislative, judicial, ecclesiastical and legislative authority and is composed of all Diocesan Bishops. The hierarchal authority of the church reserves the right, and holds in its power the ability to manage and control properties, finances, and the appointment or removal of clergy.

In the early 1900s, a small independent diocese of the church was founded by Serbian immigrants, and headquartered in Illinois. Then-priest Mardarije Uskoković established what became known as the American-Canadian Diocese of the Serbian Eastern Orthodox Church. This was the only diocese of the church to create its own constitution. This allowed relative autonomy from the Mother Church while working within the constructs of the hierarchy. Several not-for-profit organizations were created and purchased properties in the states of Illinois, New York, Pennsylvania and California. These assets would later be considered in litigation of property rights within the church.

Bishop Dionisije Milivojevich was appointed bishop of the American-Canadian Diocese by the Mother Church in 1939, and under his leadership the diocese grew substantially over the years. Years later, he requested support from the mother church to more efficiently manage the affairs of the growing diocese. Although the diocese had grown, complaints had been filed against Dionisije during his tenure. The response to Dionisje's request for additional staff support resulted in a delegation arriving to investigate diocesan needs, but also the claims against him. As a result of their investigation, the Mother Church endeavored to divide the American-Canadian Diocese into three separate dioceses, and appointed three of the investigators as bishops of the new dioceses. The delegation also suspended and eventually defrocked Dionisije due to canonical findings of misconduct.

Dionisije refused to recognize his suspension and petitioned the Patriarch arguing the Mother Church had not worked within the parameters of their own penal code or the American-Canadian Serbian Orthodox constitution. Dionisije refused to recognize his suspension, or the rulings held by the Mother Church and continued officiating in his role as bishop. While he refused to accept the holding of the Holy Synod, he also refused to participate in intra-church litigation. Dionisije rallied the Diocesan National Assembly refuting the Mother Church and declared the diocese completely autonomous from the mother church.

Dionisije also filed with the circuit court in Illinois proclaiming his post, and continued control of assets and properties owned by his diocese. The case went to the Illinois Supreme Court who held that the Holy Synod had in fact acted in violation of their own penal code, and the American-Canadian constitution when reorganizing the diocese. In effect, the court determined that Dionisije should be reinstated to his former position.

== Opinion of the Court ==
=== Majority ===
Justice Brennan authored and delivered the majority ruling. The Court overturned the decision of the Illinois Supreme Court stating that that court had overstepped its bounds in deciding issues related to ecclesiastical and political intra-church matters. The holding by the Illinois Supreme Court violated the First and Fourteenth Amendments which prohibit secular legal interference in rulings determined by hierarchical religious tribunals. According to the First Amendment as described in the Establishment and Free Exercise Clauses, decisions made by the church must be accepted as binding by civil courts.

The defrockment of clergy directly corresponded to assets held by the church as the officiating bishop has control over church properties. This dispute was seen by the majority as a religious rather than a civil matter. Brennan referred to interpretation of the First Amendment involving church property dispute in Presbyterian Church v. Hull Church, 393 U.S. 440, 449 (1969). The Hull resolution determined that civil courts may only regard the issue of property, and not the underlying religious doctrine pertaining to church property where the potential for entanglement of the secular courts and religious bodies may occur.

The Establishment Clause clearly prohibits civil courts from interpreting canon law to resolve intra-church disputes. Civil courts must defer to hierarchical tribunals to avoid civil interpretation of, and subsequent entanglement in ecclesiastical law and politics. It is here that the Illinois Supreme Court infringed upon religious freedom and due process with regard to the property disputes in the case. The church property dispute was based on religious doctrine and practice, and secular courts should not have intervened. Although courts may examine doctrinal documents, the review and use of said documents may not place the courts in the position to resolve religious controversy.

=== Dissent ===
Justice Rehnquist disagreed with the majority opinion stating that he found that there was no constitutional indisposition with regard to First Amendment infringement by the Illinois Supreme Court. Rehnquist believed that the Illinois court was simply expected to determine the correct choice of law and apply it to the canonical dispute through its own interpretation. He agreed with the Illinois Supreme Court that the higher church violated its own standards.

Although the First Amendment states explicitly that courts are restricted from delving into the evaluation of religious documents in settling property disputes, or other issues that have been settled in an ecclesiastical court or judicatory of a hierarchical church, Rehnquist argued that courts should in some cases be able to interpret church law under neutral principles.

Rehnquist referred to Watson v. Jones further stating that equating religious organizations with other voluntary associations has no bearing on or influence by the First Amendment. He suggested that common sense must be applied in decisions where majority rule displaces an attempt by the minority to usurp documented policies and procedures – much the same as it would be in a non-sectarian intra-organizational dispute. He does however agree that the First Amendment prohibits government from displacing free choice of the citizens of the United States by placing bias on one religious organization over another. He also states that he agreed with Illinois in applying neutral principles with judicial deference to the church and that court did not in any way transgress the aforementioned Amendments of the Constitution of the United States.

Rehnquist acknowledged that the court was placed in the position of choosing one side over another in a religious dispute. The question was how far into church doctrine and ecclesiastical law the civil court needed to go to make an appropriate ruling. He did allow that unless there are unambiguous rules that can be interpreted separate from any religious effect, the courts cannot make determinations in church matters. Courts are restricted from delving too far into the evaluation of religious documents in settling property disputes. This may be unfair to the petitioner because if the issue were with a non-religious entity, the courts would be allowed to perform extensive text evaluation. In Rehnquist’s opinion, the Illinois Supreme Court ruled well within the parameters of the U.S. Constitution, and the Supreme Court should not have reversed it.
