= Piper Aircraft Co. v. Reyno =

- Supreme Court of the United States

Argued October 14, 1981 Decided December 8, 1981
- Full case name: Piper Aircraft Co. v. Reyno, Personal Representative of the Estates of Fehilly at al.
- Citations: 454 U.S. 235 (more) 102 S. Ct. 252; 70 L. Ed. 2d 419

Case history
- Prior: The District Court granted the defendant a dismissal on the grounds of forum non conveniens. Reyno v. Piper Aircraft Co., 479 F. Supp. 727 (M.D. Pa. 1979). The Court of Appeals overturned this, believing the Scottish courts to be less favorable to the plaintiff than the original forum. Reyno v. Piper Aircraft Co., 630 F.2d 149 (3d Cir. 1980); cert. granted, 450 U.S. 909 (1981).
- Subsequent: Rehearing denied, 455 U.S. 928 (1982).

Holding
- The Supreme Court held that the Appeals court misinterpreted Gilbert. A change in forum to a less favorable court is permissible. The Appeals court decision was overturned and the District Court's reinstated.

Court membership
- Chief Justice Warren E. Burger Associate Justices William J. Brennan Jr. · Byron White; Thurgood Marshall · Harry Blackmun; Lewis F. Powell Jr. · William Rehnquist; John P. Stevens · Sandra Day O'Connor

Case opinions
- Majority: Marshall, joined by Burger, Blackmun, Rehnquist, White
- Concurrence: White
- Dissent: Stevens, joined by Brennan
- Justices O'Connor and Powell took no part in the consideration or decision of the case.

Piper Aircraft Co. v. Reyno, 454 U.S. 235 (1981), was a case decided by the United States Supreme Court, in which the court considered the lower court's application of its power of forum non conveniens, a common law legal doctrine whereby courts may refuse to take jurisdiction over matters where there is a more appropriate forum available to the parties.

== Facts ==
In July 1976, an airplane was involved in an accident in the Scottish Highlands while on a charter flight from Blackpool to Perth, killing the pilot and five passengers instantly. The aircraft was a Piper Aztec manufactured by Piper Aircraft Co. in the U.S. state of Pennsylvania, and Hartzell Propeller, Inc. manufactured the propellers in the U.S. state of Ohio. A British Department of Trade found no evidence of defective equipment and indicated that pilot error may have caused the accident. A California probate court appointed respondent Gaynell Reyno administratrix of the estates of the five passengers. She did not know nor was she related to any of the decedents, she was merely the legal secretary to the attorney who filed this lawsuit. Reyno admitted the choice of the United States as a venue was more favorable to her case.

== Procedural history ==
Several days after her appointment, Reyno commenced separate wrongful-death actions against Piper and Hartzell in the Superior Court of California, claiming negligence and strict liability. The defendants first removed to federal district court in California invoking diversity jurisdiction. Piper then sought to transfer under 28 U.S.C. § 1404(a) to the Middle District of Pennsylvania on grounds of convenience because Piper engaged in business in Pennsylvania. Hartzell moved to dismiss for want of personal jurisdiction, or in the alternative to transfer the case to the Middle District of Pennsylvania under 28 U.S.C. § 1631, where Hartzell's business with Piper supported jurisdiction. The district court transferred. With both cases now moved to federal district court in Pennsylvania, both defendants then sought to dismiss the case on grounds of forum non conveniens. The District Court granted these motions in October 1979. The Third Circuit reversed, on the ground that dismissal for forum non conveniens is never appropriate where the law of the alternative forum is less favorable to the plaintiff.

== Holding ==
1) The Court of Appeals (3rd Circuit) erred in holding that plaintiffs may defeat a motion to dismiss on the ground of forum non conveniens merely by showing that the substantive law that would be applied in the alternative forum is less favorable to the plaintiffs than that of the present forum.

2) The Court of Appeals also erred in rejecting the District Court's Gilbert analysis.

== Reasoning ==
=== Holding 1 ===
The possibility of a change in substantive law should ordinarily not be given conclusive or even substantial weight in the forum non conveniens inquiry. If conclusive or substantial weight were given to the possibility of a change in law, the forum non conveniens doctrine would become virtually useless. Jurisdiction and venue requirements are often easily satisfied. As a result, many plaintiffs are able to choose from among several forums. Ordinarily, these plaintiffs will select that forum whose choice-of-law rules are most advantageous. Thus, if the possibility of an unfavorable change in substantive law is given substantial weight in the forum non conveniens inquiry, dismissal would rarely be proper. Additionally, this would lead to other practical problems. At least where the foreign plaintiff named an American manufacturer as defendant, a court could not dismiss the case on grounds of forum non conveniens where dismissal might lead to an unfavorable change in law. The American courts, already very attractive to plaintiffs, would become even more attractive. The flow of litigation into the United States would increase and further congest already crowded courts.

"The Court of Appeals erred in holding that plaintiffs may defeat a motion to dismiss on the ground of forum non conveniens merely by showing that the substantive law that would be applied in the alternative forum is less favorable to the plaintiffs than that of the present forum. The possibility of a change in substantive law should ordinarily not be given conclusive or even substantial weight in the forum non conveniens inquiry."

=== Holding 2 ===
Because the central purpose of any forum non conveniens inquiry is to ensure that the trial is convenient, a foreign plaintiff's choice deserves less deference. The District Court's holding that the case would be better suited in Scotland was not unreasonable. First, because the majority of evidence was there and second, because the decedents were not able to properly implead the defendants. Also, Pennsylvania would not be a good venue because there would need to be two law standards - the Pennsylvania law would apply to Piper and Scottish law would apply to Hartzell. A trial involving two sets of laws would be confusing to the jury. A lack of familiarity with Scottish law would also be confusing. Another powerful reason why Pennsylvania is a bad venue is that Scotland has a very strong interest in this litigation. There is "a local interest in having localized controversies decided at home."

"Scotland has a very strong interest in this litigation. The accident occurred in its airspace. All of the decedents were Scottish. Apart from Piper and Hartzell, all potential plaintiffs and defendants are either Scottish or English. As we stated in Gilbert, there is 'a local interest in having localized controversies decided at home.' 330 U.S., at 509. Respondent argues that American citizens have an interest in ensuring that American manufacturers are deterred from producing defective products, and that additional deterrence might be obtained if Piper and Hartzell were tried in the United States, where they could be sued on the basis of both negligence and strict liability. However, the incremental deterrence that would be gained if this trial were held in an American court is likely to be insignificant. The American interest in this accident is simply not sufficient to justify the enormous commitment of judicial time and resources that would inevitably be required if the case were to be tried here."

== Disposition ==
The ruling of the Court of Appeals was reversed, and the decision of the District Court reinstated.

== Rule ==
If the remedy provided by the alternative forum is so clearly inadequate or unsatisfactory that it is no remedy at all, the unfavorable change in law may be given substantial weight; the district court may conclude that dismissal would not be in the interests of justice.
