= Simpson v. United States (1978) =

Simpson vs. United States
- Supreme Court of the United States

Argued November 1, 1977 Decided February 28, 1978
- Full case name: Simpson vs. United States
- Docket no.: 76-5761
- Citations: 435 U.S. 6 (more)

Holding
- A person may not be sentenced under 18 U.S.C. 2113 (d) for an armed robbery and additionally be sentenced under 18 U.S.C. 924 (c) for committing an offence through the use of a firearm.

Court membership
- Chief Justice Warren E. Burger Associate Justices William J. Brennan Jr. · Potter Stewart; Byron White · Thurgood Marshall; Harry Blackmun · Lewis F. Powell Jr. William Rehnquist · John P. Stevens

Case opinions
- Majority: Brennen, joined by Burger, Stewart, White, Marshall, Blackmun, Powell, and Stevens
- Dissent: Rehnquist

Laws applied
- 18 U.S.C. 2113 (a); 18 U.S.C. 924 (c)

Simpson vs. United States, 435 U.S. 6, was a case in which the Supreme Court of the United States ruled that a defendant cannot be sentenced under the punishments of both 18 U.S.C. 2113 (d) and 18 U.S.C. 924 (a) for armed robbery.

== Case background and convictions ==
On September 8, 1975, the defendants robbed about $40,000 from the East End Branch of the Commercial Bank of Middlesboro at gunpoint. On November 4 of the same year they did the same to the West End, walking away with about the same amount. The jury for the first robbery found them both guilty of aggravated bank robbery and sentenced them each to 25 years in prison under 18 U.S.C. 2113 (d), which provides for a maximum of 25 years in prison for a felony committed with a dangerous weapon, such as a firearm. Additionally, they were both sentenced to 10 years under 18 U.S.C. 924, which provides that, if a defendant uses a firearm to commit a felony which a court has found him guilty of, the sentence for the felony may be extended between 1 and 10 years for the first count or 2 and 25 years for subsequent counts. The jury for the second robbery returned the same verdict and sentence.

== Appeal and decision ==
The defendants appealed to the Federal District Court, arguing that the firearms charge under section 924 (c) merged with section 2113 (d) as the same crime and, because only one crime was committed, only the extension in section 2113 (d) can apply, and therefore the additional 20 years under section 924 (c) are void when it comes to an act of armed robbery. The District Court ruled that both may apply, as the legislative intention by section 924 (c) was to add an additional punishment. The defendants appealed to the Sixth Circuit Court of Appeals, which affirmed the District Court without a published opinion. The defendants appealed to the United States Supreme Court, which granted certiorari due to a conflicting ruling in United States vs. Eagle, Eighth Circuit Court of Appeals.

"𝑊𝑒 𝑎𝑓𝑓𝑖𝑟𝑚 𝑡ℎ𝑒 𝑐𝑜𝑛𝑣𝑖𝑐𝑡𝑖𝑜𝑛 𝑎𝑛𝑑 𝑠𝑒𝑛𝑡𝑒𝑛𝑐𝑒 𝑜𝑛 𝐶𝑜𝑢𝑛𝑡 𝐼, 𝑡ℎ𝑒 1153 𝑐𝑜𝑢𝑛𝑡. 𝐴𝑠 𝑡𝑜 𝐶𝑜𝑢𝑛𝑡 𝐼𝐼, 𝑡ℎ𝑒 924 (𝑐)(1) 𝑐𝑜𝑢𝑛𝑡, 𝑤𝑒 𝑟𝑒𝑣𝑒𝑟𝑠𝑒 𝑎𝑛𝑑 𝑟𝑒𝑚𝑎𝑛𝑑 𝑡ℎ𝑒 𝑐𝑎𝑠𝑒 𝑤𝑖𝑡ℎ 𝑑𝑖𝑟𝑒𝑐𝑡𝑖𝑜𝑛𝑠 𝑡ℎ𝑎𝑡 𝐶𝑜𝑢𝑛𝑡 𝐼𝐼 𝑏𝑒 𝑑𝑖𝑠𝑚𝑖𝑠𝑠𝑒𝑑," the Court said.

== Opinion ==
In an 8–1 decision authored by Justice Brennan, the court reversed the lower courts, stating that "several tools of statutory instruction applied to the statutes 'in cases like the present one' -- where the government relied on the same proofs to support the convictions under both statutes -- require the conclusion that Congress cannot be said to have authorized the imposition of the additional penalty of 924 (c) for the commission of bank robbery with firearms already subject to enhanced punishment under 2113 (d)." The ruling showed forth that if the Government requires the same burden of proof for two different punishments under two different laws, then only one punishment may be executed. The cases were reversed and remanded to the Court of Appeals for proceedings consistent with the ruling.

== Dissent ==
Justice Rehnquist was the sole dissenter. In his dissent he said that, though the punishment was enhanced under section 2113 (d), the plain language of section 924 infers the right of the District Court to enhance the punishment beyond section 2113 (d) without infringing on the protection against double jeopardy.
