= Clark v. Rameker =

- Supreme Court of the United States

Decided June 12, 2014
- Full case name: Clark v. Rameker
- Citations: 573 U.S. 122 (more)

Holding
- Funds held in inherited Individual Retirement Accounts are not "retirement funds" and are not exempt from the bankruptcy estate.

Court membership
- Chief Justice John Roberts Associate Justices Antonin Scalia · Anthony Kennedy; Clarence Thomas · Ruth Bader Ginsburg; Stephen Breyer · Samuel Alito; Sonia Sotomayor · Elena Kagan

Case opinion
- Majority: Sotomayor, joined by unanimous

Laws applied
- 11 U.S.C. § 522(b)(3)(c)

Clark v. Rameker, 573 U.S. 122 (2014), was a United States Supreme Court case in which the Court held that funds held in inherited Individual Retirement Accounts are not "retirement funds" within the meaning of 11 U.S.C. § 522(b)(3)(c) and therefore not exempt from the bankruptcy estate.
