= Frank Lyon Co. v. United States =

Frank Lyon Company v. United States
- Supreme Court of the United States

Argued November 2, 1977 Decided April 18, 1978
- Full case name: Frank Lyon Company v. United States
- Citations: 435 U.S. 561 (more) 98 S. Ct. 1291; 55 L. Ed. 2d 550; 1978 U.S. LEXIS 22; 78-1 U.S. Tax Cas. (CCH) ¶ 9370; 41 A.F.T.R.2d (RIA) 1142

Case history
- Prior: 536 F.2d 746 (8th Cir. 1976)

Court membership
- Chief Justice Warren E. Burger Associate Justices William J. Brennan Jr. · Potter Stewart; Byron White · Thurgood Marshall; Harry Blackmun · Lewis F. Powell Jr. William Rehnquist · John P. Stevens

Case opinions
- Majority: Blackmun, joined by Burger, Brennan, Stewart, Marshall, Powell, Rehnquist
- Dissent: White
- Dissent: Stevens

Laws applied
- 26 U.S.C. § 163

Frank Lyon Company v. United States, 435 U.S. 561 (1978), was a United States Supreme Court case in which the Court held that the title owner that acquired depreciable real estate as if the owner were a mere conduit or agent was indeed the owner and, for Federal income tax purposes, had the legal right to take tax deductions associated with depreciation on the building.

== Background ==
According to the text of the syllabus preceding the Court's opinion:

A state bank, which was a member of the Federal Reserve System, upon realizing that it was not feasible, because of various state and federal regulations, for it to finance by conventional mortgage and other financing a building under construction for its headquarters and principal banking facility, entered into sale-and-leaseback agreements by which petitioner took title to the building and leased it back to the bank for long-term use, petitioner obtaining both a construction loan and permanent mortgage financing. The bank is obligated to pay rent equal to the principal and interest payments on petitioner's mortgage and has an option to repurchase the building at various times at prices equal to the then unpaid balance of petitioner's mortgage and initial $500,000 investment. On its federal income tax return for the year in which the building was completed and the bank took possession, petitioner accrued rent from the bank and claimed as deductions depreciation on the building, interest on its construction loan and mortgage, and other expenses related to the sale-and-leaseback transaction.

The bank was Worthen Bank in Little Rock and the Frank Lyon Corporation engaged in the distribution of home furnishings, primarily Whirlpool and RCA electrical products. The bank bought the land and started construction of the subject building before it found a buyer. The Frank Lyon Company won the bidding to buy the building from the bank by providing $500,000 of the $7.6 million purchase price. The rest of the money came from New York Life. The mortgage loan's payments to the lender and the rent payments were engineered to be exactly equal. The title owner, Frank Lyon, never actually received the rent payments from the Worthen Bank because the three party deal specifically required that Worthen pay New York Life directly. The lease was triple net (i.e. any increase in expenses are paid not by the owner, but by the tenant).

Another fact which leads a reasonable man to conclude that Worthen Bank was the real party in a two party deal and that the Frank Lyon company was a mere agent, is that the tenant, Worthen Bank, had a 25-year lease with options to either buy the building or extend the lease for 65 years when it could still buy the building. The option's strike price was set so that Frank Lyon would be repaid exactly its $500,000 plus 6% interest.

Economic owners of an asset would be expected to bear the benefits and burdens of any change in market value of the thing owned. In this case, Worthen Bank, the tenant, bore the benefits and the burdens, rather than the title owner. The transaction was a classic sale leaseback.

== Holding ==
The court held that the Government should honor the allocation of rights and duties effectuated by the parties where there is a genuine multiple-party transaction with economic substance which is compelled or encouraged by business or regulatory realities, imbued with tax-independent considerations, and not simply shaped by tax-avoidance features with meaningless labels attached. As long as the lessor retains significant and genuine attributes of the traditional lessor status, the form of the transaction adopted by the parties governs for tax purposes. As such, a sale-and-leaseback does not necessarily operate to deny a taxpayer's claim for deductions.

== Subsequent developments ==
The result of this case was modified by the Tax Reform Act of 1986, which disallowed this tax feature. The Rose Law Firm represented the taxpayer.
