= Landmark Communications, Inc. v. Virginia =

Landmark Communications v. Virginia
- Supreme Court of the United States

Argued January 11, 1978 Decided May 1, 1978
- Full case name: Landmark Communications, Inc. v. Virginia
- Citations: 435 U.S. 829 (more) 98 S. Ct. 1535; 56 L. Ed. 2d 1; 1978 U.S. LEXIS 84

Holding
- The First Amendment does not permit the criminal punishment of third persons who are strangers to proceedings before such a commission for divulging or publishing truthful information regarding confidential proceedings of the commission.

Court membership
- Chief Justice Warren E. Burger Associate Justices William J. Brennan Jr. · Potter Stewart; Byron White · Thurgood Marshall; Harry Blackmun · Lewis F. Powell Jr. William Rehnquist · John P. Stevens

Case opinions
- Majority: Burger, joined by Stewart, White, Marshall, Blackmun, Rehnquist, Stevens
- Concurrence: Stewart
- Brennan and Powell took no part in the consideration or decision of the case.

Landmark Communications v. Virginia, 435 U.S. 829 (1978), was a United States Supreme Court case that was argued on January 11, 1978 and decided on May 1, 1978.

The court reversed a lower court's conviction of the publisher of Norfolk's The Virginian-Pilot for illegal disclosure of confidential proceedings before the Judicial Inquiry and Review Commission about a judge's misconduct.

== Background ==
Floyd Abrams represented Landmark Communications, which owned The Virginian-Pilot. The Pilot had reported on October 4, 1975, that Judge H. Warrington Sharp, who sat on the Virginia Juvenile and Domestic Relations District Court, was under an investigation by a judicial fitness panel. They were deciding whether or not to begin disciplinary proceedings against Sharp.

Under Virginia statute, each complaint against a judge was to be reviewed in secret; it would be announced only if it deemed serious enough to require a public hearing. All states had confidentiality requirements to avoid use of the disciplinary inquiry as retribution against a judge, but only Virginia and Hawaii provided for criminal penalties for disclosure.

There was a quick trial and conviction of the publisher of a misdemeanor and a $500, fine plus the costs of prosecution. Landmark appealed to the Supreme Court of Virginia, which affirmed the conviction by 6–1. The court concluded that the "requirement of confidentiality in Commission proceedings" served three purposes:

1. protection of the judge's reputation;
2. protection of public confidence in the judicial system; and
3. protection of complainants and witnesses from possible recriminations.

== Arguments ==
Abrams wrote that his primary argument was straightforward: the newspaper published a true account and had obtained the information legally, and the alleged offense was simply reporting a complaint about how a public official performed his civic role. In his brief, Abrams argued that the case raised "anew a question which penetrates to the core of our concept of self-government: whether the press may be punished for printing the truth about a public official with his public duties."

In his memoir Speaking Freely, Abrams stated that it was the first case he argued by himself before the Supreme Court. He continued that he devoted most of their preparation for the case with three overlapping issues, "ones that have consumed my attention in every later Supreme Court argument as well."

The first was jurisprudential: what rule of law would they urge the Court to adopt? What would be its effect as stare decisis and its impact on the First Amendment.

The second was tactical. Justices are known for taking up the 30 minutes of allotted argument time with question-and-answer sessions. Abrams felt he needed to figure out his core message.

The Third question was what the court might ask that would be exceptionally difficult to respond to, and what should such responses be?

Assistant Attorney General James Kulp defended the Virginia Supreme Court opinion with the above-mentioned three reasons for the statute. Justice Byron White questioned Kulp about whether the case was really about not criticizing public officials, a constitutional right, and whether he would defend a statute calling for confidentiality for protection of the judge. "No, sir," responded Kulp. "I think the cases from this Court have been clear in that respect, that, in other words, a judge, as any public official, may certainly be criticized, the administration of justice may be criticized, and we don't have any argument about that." White said if that was so, his arguments about protection the judiciary and the system held no weight. Kulp agreed.

Virginia's time before the Court dealt with the scope of the statute.

Abrams declined his rebuttal time, as he was confident in Landmark's victory.

"During one exchange, Justice William Rehnquist asked a question for which Mr. Abrams said he was "totally unprepared," but Justice Potter Stewart came to his rescue. Of all the justices, Mr. Abrams found Justice Byron R. White the most unnerving. White "invariably asked questions that were both pointed and powerful," he recalls, and Mr. Abrams never once "had the sense that anything I said pleased him." He confides that during oral argument he often felt like a mouse with "a tormenting cat." Nonetheless, he won a unanimous victory."

"It had been quite an introduction for me to arguing for a complete thirty minutes in the Supreme Court: fifty-four judicial questions and comments. Years later, when I saw Albert Brooks play a television journalist in Broadcast News who perspired so much when on the air that his shirt looked like he had just returned from a swim, I wondered if I had presented the same appearance after my Landmark argument."

== Decision ==
The Court held unanimously in favor of Landmark. Chief Justice Burger wrote the opinion for himself and the other five members (Justices Brennan and Powell recused themselves). The Court did not adopt Abrams's categorical approach (all truth reporting in reference to public duties was insulated from criminal sanctions by the First Amendment). However, the Court rejected the argument that these interests were sufficient grounds for criminal sanctions on nonparticipants in proceedings.

In its conclusion, the Court wrote: "the [clear and present danger] test requires a court to make its own inquiry into the imminence and magnitude of the danger said to flow from the particular utterance and then to balance the character of the evil as well as its likelihood against the need for free and unfettered expression."

== See also ==
- List of United States Supreme Court cases, volume 435
