= Executive Benefits Insurance Agency v. Arkison =

- Supreme Court of the United States

Decided June 9, 2014
- Full case name: Executive Benefits Insurance Agency v. Arkison
- Citations: 573 U.S. 25 (more)

Holding
- Under Stern v. Marshall, when a bankruptcy court does not have subject matter jurisdiction over a proceeding, the bankruptcy court may still hear the case and issue proposed findings to be reviewed de novo by a federal district court.

Court membership
- Chief Justice John Roberts Associate Justices Antonin Scalia · Anthony Kennedy; Clarence Thomas · Ruth Bader Ginsburg; Stephen Breyer · Samuel Alito; Sonia Sotomayor · Elena Kagan

Case opinion
- Majority: Thomas, joined by unanimous

Executive Benefits Insurance Agency v. Arkison, 573 U.S. 25 (2014), was a United States Supreme Court case in which the Court held that, under Stern v. Marshall, when a bankruptcy court does not have subject matter jurisdiction over a proceeding, the bankruptcy court may still hear the case and issue proposed findings to be reviewed de novo by a federal district court.

== Background ==
Bellingham Insurance Agency, Inc. (BIA), filed a voluntary Chapter 7 bankruptcy petition. Peter Arkison, the bankruptcy trustee, filed a complaint in the Bankruptcy Court against Executive Benefits Insurance Agency (EBIA) and others, alleging the fraudulent conveyance of assets from BIA to EBIA. The Bankruptcy Court granted summary judgment for the trustee. EBIA appealed to the federal district court, which affirmed the Bankruptcy Court's decision after de novo review and entered judgment for the trustee.

While EBIA's appeal to the Ninth Circuit Court of Appeals was pending, the Supreme Court held in Stern v. Marshall that Article III of the United States Constitution did not permit a Bankruptcy Court to enter final judgment on a counterclaim for tortious interference, even though final adjudication of that claim by the Bankruptcy Court was authorized by statute. In light of Stern, EBIA moved to dismiss its appeal for lack of jurisdiction. The Ninth Circuit rejected EBIA's motion and affirmed. It acknowledged the trustee's claims as "Stern claims," i.e., claims designated for final adjudication in the bankruptcy court as a statutory matter but prohibited from proceeding in that way as a constitutional matter. The Court of Appeals nevertheless concluded that EBIA had impliedly consented to jurisdiction. The Court of Appeals also observed that the Bankruptcy Court's judgment could instead be treated as proposed findings of fact and conclusions of law, subject to de novo review by the district court.

== Significance ==
Because bankruptcy courts in the United States are organized as Article I tribunals rather than as Article III courts, they are not permitted to exercise the judicial power of the United States. Stern v. Marshall identified so-called "Stern claims" that required exercising the judicial power and were therefore beyond the authority of bankruptcy courts. Stern was very disruptive in the sense that, technically, it was not precisely clear what bankruptcy courts could and could not hear for lack of jurisdiction. This case established that bankruptcy courts could continue to hear their cases as before, so long as the Stern claims were later heard by an Article III court with appropriate jurisdiction.
