= Lakeside v. Oregon =

Lakeside vs. Oregon
- Supreme Court of the United States

Argued January 18, 1978 Decided March 22, 1978
- Full case name: Lakeside vs. Oregon
- Docket no.: 76-6492
- Citations: 435 U.S. 333 (more)

Case history
- Prior: Oregon Court of Appeals (trial judgement vacated; new trial granted); Oregon Supreme Court (Court of Appeals reversed; jury sentence reinstated)

Holding
- The instruction of a trial judge to the jury not to draw conclusions of guilt or innocence based on the defendant's right to remain silent, even if the defendant objects to the instruction, is not a compelled self-incrimination and does not violate the Fifth Amendment. Additionally, it does not violate the right to council under the Sixth Amendment.

Court membership
- Chief Justice Warren E. Burger Associate Justices William J. Brennan Jr. · Potter Stewart; Byron White · Thurgood Marshall; Harry Blackmun · Lewis F. Powell Jr. William Rehnquist · John P. Stevens

Case opinions
- Majority: Stewart, joined by Burger, White, Blackmun, Powell, Rehnquist
- Dissent: Stevens, joined by Marshall
- Brennan took no part in the consideration or decision of the case.

Laws applied
- The Fifth and Sixth Amendments

Lakeside vs. Oregon (435 U.S. 333) was a decision in which the Supreme Court of the United States ruled that trial judges may instruct a jury to not find a defendant guilty in any way based on his refusal to testify against himself, even if the defendant objects to the instruction.

The defendant was in a Multnomah County Corrections Center when he was charged with escape in the second degree. His defense council, as requested by the defendant, requested that the trial judge not inform the jury of the privilege against self-incrimination, claiming that it would raise a red flag to the jurors of his guilt. The trial judge denied the defendant's request and informed jury, claiming that procedural due process under the Constitution requires that jurors understand the defendant's rights. The jury subsequently found the defendant guilty of escape in the second degree.

The defendant appealed, claiming that his Fifth and Sixth Amendment rights were violated by the trial judge. The Oregon Court of Appeals vacated the ruling of jury based on this claim and ordered a new trial. The Oregon Supreme Court, however, reversed the Court of Appeals, arguing that no due process rights could be violated by instructing the jury of the defendant's due process rights. The defendant appealed to the U.S. Supreme Court, which, due to conflicting rulings in various Courts across the Country, granted 𝘤𝘦𝘳𝘵𝘪𝘰𝘳𝘢𝘳𝘪.

Justice Stewart wrote the opinion of the court. In a 6-2 decision, they upheld the ruling of the Oregon Supreme Court, stating that the due process rights under the Fifth and Sixth Amendments are not violated during jury instruction.
