= United States v. Clarke =

- Supreme Court of the United States

Decided June 19, 2014
- Full case name: United States v. Clarke
- Citations: 573 U.S. 248 (more)

Holding
- A taxpayer who wants to question Internal Revenue Service agents about their motives for issuing a summons may do so if they can point to "specific facts or circumstances plausibly raising an inference of bad faith."

Court membership
- Chief Justice John Roberts Associate Justices Antonin Scalia · Anthony Kennedy; Clarence Thomas · Ruth Bader Ginsburg; Stephen Breyer · Samuel Alito; Sonia Sotomayor · Elena Kagan

Case opinion
- Majority: Kagan, joined by unanimous

United States v. Clarke, 573 U.S. 248 (2014), was a United States Supreme Court case in which the Court held that a taxpayer who wants to question Internal Revenue Service agents about their motives for issuing a summons may do so if they can point to "specific facts or circumstances plausibly raising an inference of bad faith."
