= Hill v. Colorado =

- Supreme Court of the United States

Argued January 19, 2000 Decided June 28, 2000
- Full case name: Leila Jeanne Hill, et al. v. Colorado, et al.
- Docket no.: 98-1856
- Citations: 530 U.S. 703 (more)
- Argument: Oral argument

Case history
- Prior: Cert. granted, Hill v. Colorado, 527 U.S. 1068 (1999).; Affirmed, Hill v. Thomas, 973 P.2d 1246 (Colo. 1999).; Affirmed, Hill v. City of Lakewood, 973 P.2d 1246 (Colo. 1999).; Granted, vacated, and remanded, Hill v. Colorado, 519 U.S. 1145 (1997).; Cert. denied (Colorado Supreme Court).; Affirmed, Hill v. City of Lakewood 911 P.2d 670 (Colo. App. 1995).; Summary judgment granted to defendants.

Holding
- Section 18–9–122(3)’s restrictions on speech-related conduct are constitutional.

Court membership
- Chief Justice William Rehnquist Associate Justices John P. Stevens · Sandra Day O'Connor; Antonin Scalia · Anthony Kennedy; David Souter · Clarence Thomas; Ruth Bader Ginsburg · Stephen Breyer

Case opinions
- Majority: Stevens, joined by Rehnquist, O'Connor, Souter, Ginsburg, Breyer
- Concurrence: Souter, joined by O'Connor, Ginsburg, Breyer
- Dissent: Scalia, joined by Thomas
- Dissent: Kennedy

Laws applied
- U.S. Const. amend. I Colo. Rev. Stat. § 18–9–122(3) (1999)

Hill v. Colorado, 530 U.S. 703 (2000), was a United States Supreme Court decision regarding the First Amendment. The Court ruled 6–3 that the right to free speech was not violated by a Colorado law limiting protest, education, distribution of literature, or counseling within eight feet of a person entering a healthcare facility.

== Background ==
In response to protesting at abortion clinics, Colorado legislated that protesters within one hundred feet of any healthcare facility may not approach within eight feet of any other person without consent for the purpose of protest, education, distribution of literature, or counseling.

== Decision ==
=== Majority opinion ===
Justice John Paul Stevens wrote the majority opinion:

1. The state has a compelling interest in creating this legislation. Its interest is to protect citizens entering or exiting a medical facility from unwanted communication. The law does not prevent patients from being communicated with entirely but better allows them to better avoid situations in they wish to not listen to the message of speakers. Even though speakers have a right to persuade, that cannot extend to unwilling listeners because people also have a right "to be let alone."
2. As explained in Ward v. Rock Against Racism, legislation restricting speech in addition to requiring a compelling state interest needs to be content neutral. That is specifically important in time, place, and manner legislation. It is content neutral because it does not regulate speech, just one arena for speech. No matter what message a person is trying to convey, the statute would apply. The legislation is not viewpoint-based simply because it was enacted in response to issues being raised by a certain viewpoint.
3. The legislation is narrowly tailored to meet the Ward requirements. Also, as the Court explained in Ward, even if the statute is not the least restrictive policy that could satisfy the state's compelling interest, it is sufficient because it leaves open other channels of communication.
4. The statute does not completely prevent demonstrators from getting their points heard. Citizens may still yell, hold signs, and convince from eight feet away. The only thing that is seriously impeded is their ability to distribute literature. However, demonstrators can still hand out leaflets to willing recipients.
5. Protecting the well-being of patients entering or exiting healthcare facilities is specifically targeted by this legislation because they are more likely to be emotionally and physically vulnerable.
6. "Prior restraint" arguments claiming that Colorado is putting a prior restraint on constitutionally-protected speech are wrong. Prior restraint is not an issue except in government censorship cases. However, in this case, individuals can choose to deny or permit communication.

=== Souter's concurring opinion ===
Justices David Souter, Sandra Day O'Connor, Ruth Bader Ginsburg, and Stephen Breyer concurred:

1. The legislation seeks to prevent unwanted approaching, not speech.

=== Scalia's dissenting opinion ===
Justices Antonin Scalia and Clarence Thomas dissented:

1. This law is not content neutral, as it is obviously being applied only to abortion clinics and anti-abortion messages.
2. Protecting citizens from unwanted speech is not a compelling state interest.
3. The number of places actually being covered by the statute is very large if one considers the extensive number of healthcare facilities. Therefore, speech is restricted very significantly.
4. The law removes one of the few outlets in which peaceful and civil pro-life citizens could get their point across to women on abortion, but now only inappropriate bullying groups will be heard.
5. The decision is in conflict with other First Amendment restriction cases. The only reason the Court now changed is that the messages are not content-neutral but are about abortion.

=== Kennedy's dissenting opinion ===
Justice Anthony Kennedy dissented:

1. The legislation is definitely content based and so directly violates the First Amendment.

== Aftermath ==
The Supreme Court declined to hear a case challenging Hill v. Colorado on February 24, 2025, although Justice Thomas noted the Court's "recent[]" characterization of Hill as a "'distort[ion]'" of First Amendment doctrine, as well as its inconsistencies with subsequent precedents, before arguing that Hill ought to be overruled.

== See also ==
- Heckler's veto
- McCullen v. Coakley (2014)
