= Citizens Against Rent Control v. City of Berkeley =

- Supreme Court of the United States

Argued October 14, 1981 Decided December 14, 1981
- Full case name: Citizens Against Rent Control/Coalition for Fair Housing v. City of Berkeley, California
- Citations: 454 U.S. 290 (more) 102 S. Ct. 434; 70 L. Ed. 2d 492; 1981 U.S. LEXIS 135

Case history
- Prior: 27 Cal.3d 819, 614 P.2d 742 (1980).

Holding
- The Court struck down limits on contributions to committees that advocated the passage or defeat of ballot issues as a violation of the First Amendment.

Court membership
- Chief Justice Warren E. Burger Associate Justices William J. Brennan Jr. · Byron White; Thurgood Marshall · Harry Blackmun; Lewis F. Powell Jr. · William Rehnquist; John P. Stevens · Sandra Day O'Connor

Case opinions
- Majority: Burger, joined by Brennan, Powell, Rehnquist, Stevens
- Concurrence: Rehnquist
- Concurrence: Marshall
- Concurrence: Blackmun, O'Connor
- Dissent: White

Laws applied
- U.S. Const. amend. I

Citizens Against Rent Control v. City of Berkeley, 454 U.S. 290 (1981), was a case in which the Supreme Court of the United States invalidated a local law that set limits on contributions to ballot issue campaigns. The ruling relies heavily on the Court's earlier decisions in Buckley v. Valeo, holding that limits on contributions to political candidates implicate the First Amendment, and First National Bank of Boston v. Bellotti, holding that the state and local governments have no compelling interest in limiting spending on speech about ballot issues.
