= Buckley v. American Constitutional Law Foundation, Inc. =

- Supreme Court of the United States

Argued October 14, 1998 Decided January 12, 1999
- Full case name: Buckley, Secretary of State of Colorado v. American Constitutional Law Foundation, Inc., et al.
- Citations: 525 U.S. 182 (more) 119 S. Ct. 636; 142 L. Ed. 2d 599; 1999 U.S. LEXIS 506
- Argument: Oral argument

Case history
- Prior: American Constitutional Law Foundation, Inc. v. Meyer, 870 F. Supp. 995 (D. Colo. 1994); 120 F.3d 1092 (10th Cir. 1997); cert. granted, 522 U.S. 1107 (1998).

Holding
- Colorado's requirements of petition proponents and circulators violate the First Amendment freedom of speech protection and right to petition under the Constitution.

Court membership
- Chief Justice William Rehnquist Associate Justices John P. Stevens · Sandra Day O'Connor; Antonin Scalia · Anthony Kennedy; David Souter · Clarence Thomas; Ruth Bader Ginsburg · Stephen Breyer

Case opinions
- Majority: Ginsburg, joined by Stevens, Scalia, Kennedy, Souter
- Concurrence: Thomas
- Concur/dissent: O'Connor, joined by Breyer
- Dissent: Rehnquist

Laws applied
- U.S. Const. amends. I, XIV

Buckley v. American Constitutional Law Foundation, Inc., 525 U.S. 182 (1999), was a United States Supreme Court case that dealt with the authority of states to regulate the electoral process, and the point at which state regulations of the electoral process violate the First Amendment freedoms.

== Background ==
Article V, section 1 of the Constitution of the state of Colorado allows its citizens to place particular initiatives and referendums on the electoral ballot, thus directly creating new laws. Notable initiatives and referendums include the Colorado state capital referendum, in 1881; the Poundstone Amendment in 1974, about county annexations, which originated as an initiative; and the Gallagher Amendment on property taxes, in 1982.

Under Meyer v. Grant, decided by the Supreme Court in 1988, proponents of an initiative are allowed to hire others to circulate that initiative. By law, a circulator is any "person who presents to other persons for possible signature a petition to place a measure on the ballot by initiative or referendum", whether paid or not. Nevertheless, the power to hire circulators is subject to restrictions; under state law, proponents and circulators are subject to a number of requirements: for example, all proponents and circulators are required to be residents of Colorado, citizens of the United States, and at least eighteen years of age.

In 1993, under the laws of the time, circulators were also required to be registered voters of Colorado, and at least eighteen years old. Circulation times for initiatives and referendums were limited to only six months; and circulators were required to sign affidavits that showed their names and addresses, including their country of residence. Furthermore, all circulators had to identify whether they were being paid to circulate the petition though an identification card, which also displayed their names, and the telephone number of their employer (if they were being paid). Finally, proponent-employers also had to report, on a monthly basis, their names, the names and addresses of paid circulators, circulators' monthly salary and debt totals, and the name of each proposed ballot measure; likewise, when an initiative was filed with the Secretary of State of Colorado, a report was required from the proponents, detailing the amount of money paid per signature, the total payment to circulators, and the personal information (including name, address, and county of voter registration) of any paid circulators.

=== Facts of the case ===
In 1994, several petitioners banded together to form the American Constitutional Law Foundation (ACLF), a non-profit dedicated to direct democracy, challenging six restrictions: the age requirement, the registered voter requirement, the time limit, the affidavit requirement, the identification badge requirement, and the reporting requirements (both monthly and at time of filing).

The ACLF alleged that, taken together, the requirements restricted freedom of speech, in violation of the First Amendment, and filed suit against the Secretary of State of Colorado at the time, Natalie Meyer, in the United States District Court for the District of Colorado.

Chief Judge Matsch of the district court agreed with them, declaring several provisions and restrictions "invalid because they are in violation of the First and Fourteenth Amendments to the United States Constitution". In particular, the restrictions relating to identification cards were struck down, along with parts of the reporting requirement; nevertheless, the age and affidavit requirements were upheld, as was the six-month time limit.

Both the ACLF and the Secretary of State appealed to the United States Court of Appeals for the Tenth Circuit: the Foundation requesting that additional portions of the law be struck down, while Meyer argued that the law be reinstated. In 1997, the Court of Appeals affirmed in part and reversed in part: upholding the age and affidavit requirements, along with the time limit, but striking down the registered voter requirement, and parts of the badge and disclosure requirements.

By the time the appeal reached the Supreme Court, in 1998, the Secretary of State was Victoria Buckley, having won election in 1994.

Thus, Victoria Buckley appealed the case to the Supreme Court, requesting that the high court review the registration, badge, and disclosure requirements.

== Oral arguments ==
Gale Norton, as the Attorney General of Colorado, argued the case for the appellant, stating that the State, under the strict scrutiny standard, had a compelling interest in preventing forgery, fraud, and misconduct; as well as in ensuring the integrity and the reliability of the legislative process, similar to the commitment of state legislators and state judges. Additionally, Norton argued that asking persons to sign an initiative was akin to performing an electoral function.

Arguments for the respondents centered around the scope of core political speech, as noted in Meyer v. Grant, and how the requirements differed between initiatives and other petition drives, such as nomination petitions. Other lines of questioning involved possible monetary inducement, known evidence of fraudulent signatures, and the details of the expenditures.

== Opinion of the Court ==
In a 6–3 decision, the Court affirmed the opinion of the Tenth Circuit, holding that the name, badge, and disclosure requirements were unlawful. Justice Ruth Bader Ginsburg, writing for the majority, noted that states that allow ballot initiatives have the right to protect the integrity of the initiative process, but the First Amendment required the Court to be vigilant against "undue hindrances to political conversations and the exchange of ideas."

=== Majority opinion ===
In the view of the majority, the registered voter requirement was too severe a burden on speech, and Buckley's argument about the ease of registration could not stand: some persons who would otherwise join a ballot initiative view not registering to vote as a form of protest and a rejection of an unresponsive political process. Instead, the affidavit requirement was enough, as it required the addresses of circulators, including their counties of residence.

The Court further noted that, given the controversial nature of some initiatives and petitions, identification badges opened circulators up to '"heat of the moment" harassment', as they were worn when presenting a petition. Indeed, the "badge requirement compels personal name identification at the precise moment when the circulator's interest in anonymity is greatest" — like in McIntyre v. Ohio Elections Commission (1995), the state must allow anonymous political speech, at least at the immediate point of contact between circulators and Colorado residents. Again, the majority proceeded to deem the affidavit requirement sufficient for purposes of identification, and prevention of misconduct, as the required affidavits were "separated from the moment the circulator speaks" and not immediately accessible by any member of the public.

Third, the reporting and disclosure requirements, already "trimmed" by the Tenth Circuit, were further restricted: the benefit of revealing the names of paid circulators and the amount they were paid was not demonstrated, and created too great a difference between paid circulators and their volunteer counterparts, failing exacting scrutiny. As such, those requirements were struck down. The final report, at the time of filing, would still note the amount paid per petition signature, as well as the names of proponents and their ballot measures, akin to the mandatory disclosure requirements in Buckley v. Valeo (1976). (The names of the circulators could be indirectly gleaned from the affidavit requirement.)

Ultimately, the majority opinion held that there were "less problematic measures" that allowed Colorado to satisfy its interest in protecting the initiative process, but that "the restrictions in question significantly inhibit communication with voters about proposed political change, and are not warranted by the state interests (administrative efficiency, fraud detection, informing voters) alleged to justify those restrictions."

=== Thomas's concurrence ===
Justice Thomas concurred in the judgment only, stating that when the issue at hand was core political speech, precedent required that each requirement "must be evaluated under strict scrutiny."

In his view, the badge requirement directly regulated the content of speech, and was too overly broad to satisfy narrow tailoring. In addition, the compelling government interest at hand, the prevention of fraud and misconduct, had not been sufficiently shown to exist as a real problem.

Second, the registration requirement operated much like Colorado's ban on paid circulators — which the Court had struck down in Meyer v. Grant (1988), ten years before. Though neither directly regulated speech, both still limited the number of potential speakers, and thus, the size of the audience that circulators might reach. Furthermore, the compelling interest, ensuring that circulators are voters, was defeated by the fact that many Colorado residents were not voters, and that a residency requirement would be far more narrowly tailored and serve the government interest better.

Finally, he argued, even if Colorado had a compelling interest in identifying circulators, the reporting requirement did not serve that purpose: it only required the names of paid circulators, not all circulators.

All in all, Justice Thomas "would apply strict scrutiny to each of the challenged restrictions, and would affirm the judgment of the Court of Appeals as to each of the three provisions before" the Court.

=== Rehnquist's dissent ===
Chief Justice Rehnquist dissented from the majority.

== See also ==
- Meyer v. Grant
