= Cabell v. Chavez-Salido =

- Supreme Court of the United States

Argued November 3, 1981 Decided January 12, 1982
- Full case name: Clarence E. Cabell, et al. v. Jose Chavez-Salido, et al.
- Citations: 454 U.S. 432 (more) 102 S. Ct. 735; 70 L. Ed. 2d 677

Holding
- Laws excluding aliens from becoming probation officers are constitutional because they fall within the political function exception to the Equal Protection clause.

Court membership
- Chief Justice Warren E. Burger Associate Justices William J. Brennan Jr. · Byron White; Thurgood Marshall · Harry Blackmun; Lewis F. Powell Jr. · William Rehnquist; John P. Stevens · Sandra Day O'Connor

Case opinions
- Majority: White, joined by Burger, Powell, Rehnquist, O'Connor
- Dissent: Blackmun, joined by Brennan, Marshall, Stevens

Laws applied
- United States Constitution, Amendment XIV

Cabell v. Chavez-Salido, 454 U.S. 432 (1982), was a case decided by the Supreme Court of the United States that upheld a state law as constitutional that excluded aliens from positions as probation officers. The Court found that probation officers fell within the political function exception to strict scrutiny equal protection analysis because probation officers exercise discretionary power involving a basic governmental function that gives them authority over the individual.

== See also ==
- List of United States Supreme Court cases, volume 454
