= Locke v. Davey =

- Supreme Court of the United States

Argued December 2, 2003 Decided February 25, 2004
- Full case name: Gary Locke, Governor of Washington, et al., Petitioners v. Joshua Davey
- Citations: 540 U.S. 712 (more) 124 S. Ct. 1307; 158 L. Ed. 2d 1; 2004 U.S. LEXIS 1626; 72 U.S.L.W. 4206; 17 Fla. L. Weekly Fed. S 163

Case history
- Prior: Davey v. Locke, No. C00-61R, 2000 WL 35505408 (W.D. Wash. Oct. 5, 2000); Reversed, 299 F.3d 748 (9th Cir. 2002); Cert. granted, 538 U.S. 1031 (2003).

Holding
- A Washington publicly funded scholarship program which excluded students pursuing a "degree in theology" does not violate the Free Exercise Clause.

Court membership
- Chief Justice William Rehnquist Associate Justices John P. Stevens · Sandra Day O'Connor; Antonin Scalia · Anthony Kennedy; David Souter · Clarence Thomas; Ruth Bader Ginsburg · Stephen Breyer

Case opinions
- Majority: Rehnquist, joined by Stevens, O'Connor, Kennedy, Souter, Ginsburg, Breyer
- Dissent: Scalia, joined by Thomas
- Dissent: Thomas

Laws applied
- U.S. Const. amend. I

Locke v. Davey, 540 U.S. 712 (2004), is a United States Supreme Court decision upholding the constitutionality of a Washington publicly funded scholarship program which excluded students pursuing a "degree in devotional theology". This case examined the "room ... between the two Religion Clauses", the Free Exercise Clause and the Establishment Clause.

Chief Justice William Rehnquist wrote the opinion of the court, with Justices Antonin Scalia and Clarence Thomas dissenting.

== Background ==
The legislature of Washington State created the Promise Scholarship in 1999 for students who met academic, enrollment, and income qualifications. The scholarship, funded by the State's general fund, was sent directly to academic institutions to be distributed to students who could use the funds to pay for their educational expenses.

Students could use the funds to attend any accredited institution, including religious private institutions, as long as they were not enrolled in a degree program that was "devotional in nature or designed to induce religious faith". Joshua Davey received a Promise Scholarship and enrolled at a private Christian college. When he found out he would not be able to receive his scholarship money if he enrolled as a theology major, he sued in District Court, arguing violations of the First Amendment and the Equal Protection Clause of the Fourteenth Amendment. He lost on all counts. The Court of Appeals for the Ninth Circuit applied Church of Lukumi Babalu Aye v. City of Hialeah to uphold the Free Exercise claim, saying it was express discrimination that the "State had singled out religion for unfavorable treatment".

The Washington State Constitution did not allow public funds to be used to aid religion: "No public money or property shall be appropriated for or applied to any religious worship, exercise or instruction". Zelman v. Simmons-Harris had decided that the independent choice of the recipient saved vouchers from an Establishment Clause challenge. The Court now had to decide whether state constitutions could ban public aid for religious education without violating the Free Exercise Clause.

== Supreme Court ==
=== Majority opinion ===
Writing for the majority, Chief Justice William Rehnquist interpreted the Free Exercise Clause as limiting government regulation of the clergy. The Court said that "there is room for play in the joints" between the Religion Clauses: "there are some state actions permitted by the Establishment Clause but not required by the Free Exercise Clause".

The Court distinguished the case from McDaniel v. Paty by deciding that an exception for the training of clergy is "not evidence of hostility toward religion". The Court held that there is nothing "inherently constitutionally suspect" in the denial of funding for vocational religious instruction. Even if there were, Washington had a "substantial state interest" in not funding "devotional degrees".

The 7–2 decision upheld the statute. States could make public funds available for students pursuing religious studies without violating the Establishment Clause, but not making the scholarship available was not a Free Exercise violation. The Court decided that, in this case, the state had simply declined to provide such financial aid.

=== Subsequent developments ===
In Trinity Lutheran the clergy training exception allowed Chief Justice John Roberts to distinguish Locke v. Davey. The Court noted that public funding for improving a playground does not raise the same establishment concerns as training of clergy, and applies McDaniel v. Paty because "Davey was not denied a scholarship because of who he was; he was denied a scholarship because of what he proposed to do—use the funds to prepare for the ministry."

In Carson v. Makin, with Chief Justice Roberts again writing for the majority, the Court further confined the precedential reach of Locke v. Davey by holding that the decision should apply only to its particular facts and "cannot be read beyond its narrow focus on vocational religious degrees to generally authorize the state to exclude religious persons from the enjoyment of public benefits on the basis of their anticipated religious use of the benefits."

== See also ==
- List of United States Supreme Court cases, volume 540
- List of United States Supreme Court cases
