= McDonald v. Smith =

- Supreme Court of the United States

Argued March 20, 1985 Decided June 19, 1985
- Full case name: Robert McDonald v. David I. Smith
- Citations: 472 U.S. 479 (more) 105 S. Ct. 2787; 86 L. Ed. 2d 384; 1985 U.S. LEXIS 112; 53 U.S.L.W. 4789

Case history
- Prior: Petitioner removed the case to Federal District Court on the basis of diversity of citizenship. District Court rejected absolute immunity. Upheld on appeal, Fourth Circuit.

Holding
- The Petition Clause does not provide absolute immunity to defendants charged with expressing libelous and damaging falsehoods in petitions to Government officials.

Court membership
- Chief Justice Warren E. Burger Associate Justices William J. Brennan Jr. · Byron White; Thurgood Marshall · Harry Blackmun; Lewis F. Powell Jr. · William Rehnquist; John P. Stevens · Sandra Day O'Connor

Case opinions
- Majority: Burger, joined by Brennan, White, Marshall, Blackmun, Rehnquist, Stevens, O'Connor
- Concurrence: Brennan, joined by Marshall, Blackmun
- Powell took no part in the consideration or decision of the case.

Laws applied
- U.S. Const. amend. I

McDonald v. Smith, 472 U.S. 479 (1985), was a United States Supreme Court case in which the Court held that the right to petition does not provide absolute immunity to petitioners; it is subject to the same restrictions as other First Amendment rights.

== Background ==
In 1981, David Smith brought a libel suit against Robert McDonald claiming that Mcdonald had included knowing and malicious lies in a letter to the President concerning Smith's possible appointment as a United States attorney. Smith claimed that these libelous claims damaged both his chances of appointment and his reputation and career. McDonald first had the case removed to federal court on the basis of diversity of citizenship. Since the alleged libel was contained in a letter (petition) to the President, he moved for judgment on the pleadings on the grounds that the Petition Clause of the First Amendment protected his right to express his views without limitation as long as it was part of a constitutionally protected petition.

== Opinion of the Court ==
The issue before the Court was whether the right to petition the government granted absolute immunity from liability.

The Court decided 8–0 (Justice Powell took no part in the case) that the right to petition was subject to the same legal limitations that the rights to speech and the press are as previously decided in New York Times Co. v. Sullivan (1964). Therefore, claims made in the original letter, or in any similar petition, were and are subject to libel lawsuits to be judged on their merits. Chief Justice Burger delivered the opinion of the Court, in which all other members joined. Justice Brennan wrote a concurrence, joined by Justices Marshall and Blackmun.
