= Widmar v. Vincent =

- Supreme Court of the United States

Argued October 6, 1981 Decided December 8, 1981
- Full case name: Gary E. Widmar v. Clark Vincent
- Citations: 454 U.S. 263 (more) 102 S. Ct. 269; 70 L. Ed. 2d 440

Case history
- Prior: Chess v. Widmar, 480 F. Supp. 907 (W.D. Mo. 1979); reversed, 635 F.2d 1310 (8th Cir. 1980); cert. granted, 450 U.S. 909 (1981).

Holding
- When a public university opens its facilities to student meetings, it creates a public forum; given no other justification, the university may not exclude religious groups based on the content of its members’ speech. Because the University of Missouri denied this space to Cornerstone, an avowedly Christian organization, it violated both Cornerstone's 14th Amendment equal protection rights, as well as its guarantee of free speech rights found in the First Amendment.

Court membership
- Chief Justice Warren E. Burger Associate Justices William J. Brennan Jr. · Byron White; Thurgood Marshall · Harry Blackmun; Lewis F. Powell Jr. · William Rehnquist; John P. Stevens · Sandra Day O'Connor

Case opinions
- Majority: Powell, joined by Burger, Brennan, Marshall, Blackmun, Rehnquist, O'Connor
- Concurrence: Stevens
- Dissent: White

Laws applied
- U.S. Const. amends. I, XIV;

Widmar v. Vincent, 454 U.S. 263 (1981), held that when the U.S. government provides an "open forum," it may not discriminate against speech that takes place within that forum on the basis of the viewpoint it expresses—in this case, against religious speech engaged in by an evangelical Christian organization.

== Facts ==
Cornerstone, a Christian organization for students of the University of Missouri–Kansas City, had for many years, with University permission, used classrooms for its weekly meetings. In 1977, the group sought to use additional room for religious services, outside of instructional hours. The university rejected the request, citing university and state regulations prohibiting the use of the public space for worship, as a violation of the Establishment Clause.

Cornerstone filed suit in United States District Court for the Western District of Missouri, and the district court issued a summary judgement in favor of the University. Upon appeal, the Eighth Circuit reversed the district court, whereupon the university appealed to the US Supreme Court.

== Majority opinion ==
In an 8–1 decision, Justice Lewis Powell wrote for the majority, that "through its policy of accommodating their meetings, the University [had] created a forum generally open for use by student groups." In order to justify the exclusion of speech from such a public forum based on the speech's religious content, the University "must show that its regulation is necessary to serve a compelling state interest and that it is narrowly drawn to achieve that end."

In this case, the University asserted an interest in fulfilling its responsibilities under the Establishment Clause of the First Amendment. The Court agreed that this would count as a compelling state interest. But Powell argues that a regulation opening facilities to both religious and secular groups would pass the three-pronged test established in Lemon v. Kurtzman (1971). The regulation plainly would have a secular purpose. It wouldn't entangle the state excessively with religion. And it doesn't have a primary effect of advancing or inhibiting religion.

The University's argument [that to allow Cornerstone access to the rooms] misconceives the nature of this case. The question is not whether the creation of a religious forum would violate the Establishment Clause. The University has opened its facilities for use by student groups, and the question is whether it can now exclude groups because of the content of their speech. In this context, we are unpersuaded that the primary effect of the public forum, open to all forms of discourse, would be to advance religion.

Powell concluded that it was specious to argue that this use of the rooms would "advance" religion, and thus Cornerstone won its case.

=== Stevens' concurring opinion ===
Justice Stevens concurred in the Court's opinion, but wrote a concurrence to note a minor disagreement about whether or not the situation even amounted to a "forum".

== Dissenting opinion ==
Justice White held that, while the university was not prohibited from granting Cornerstone the right to use the rooms for religious service, strongly asserted that the university had no obligation to do so. What is "can do" is not the same as what it "must do", he stated.

== Aftermath ==
In 1984, Congress passed a law, the Equal Access Act, which extended the effect of the Court's opinion in Widmar to all secondary schools that receive federal education funds.
