= List of United States Supreme Court cases, volume 435 =

This is a list of all the United States Supreme Court cases from volume 435 of the United States Reports:

Case name	Citation	Date decided
Califano v. Torres	435 U.S. 1	1978
Simpson v. United States (1978)	435 U.S. 6	1978
Cent. Ill. Pub. Serv. Co. v. United States	435 U.S. 21	1978
Fed. Mar. Comm'n v. Pac. Mar. Ass'n	435 U.S. 40	1978
Univ. of Mo. v. Horowitz	435 U.S. 78	1978
United States v. Sheffield Bd. of Comm'rs	435 U.S. 110	1978
Ray v. Atl. Richfield Co.	435 U.S. 151	1978
Oliphant v. Suquamish Tribe	435 U.S. 191	1978
Cleland v. Nat'l Coll. of Bus.	435 U.S. 213	1978
Ballew v. Georgia	435 U.S. 223	1978
Carey v. Piphus	435 U.S. 247	1978
United States v. Ceccolini	435 U.S. 268	1978
Foley v. Connelie	435 U.S. 291	1978
United States v. Wheeler (1978)	435 U.S. 313	1978
Lakeside v. Oregon	435 U.S. 333	1978
Stump v. Sparkman	435 U.S. 349	1978
United States v. Culbert	435 U.S. 371	1978
Bankers Tr. Co. v. Mallis	435 U.S. 381	1978
Lafayette v. La. Power & Light Co.	435 U.S. 389	1978
Massachusetts v. United States	435 U.S. 444	1978
Holloway v. Arkansas	435 U.S. 475	1978
Malone v. White Motor Corp.	435 U.S. 497	1978
Vt. Yankee Nuclear Power Corp. v. Nat. Res. Def. Council, Inc.	435 U.S. 519	1978
Proctor v. Warden	435 U.S. 559	1978
A grant, vacate, remand order sending the habeas case back to the court of appeals because the lower court's denial of the petition referred to the wrong statute and the wrong district court and the wrong case.
Frank Lyon Co. v. United States	435 U.S. 561	1978
Nixon v. Warner Commc'ns, Inc.	435 U.S. 589	1978
McDaniel v. Paty	435 U.S. 618	1978
Elkins v. Moreno	435 U.S. 647	1978
Nat'l Soc'y of Prof. Eng'rs v. United States	435 U.S. 679	1978
City of Los Angeles Department of Water & Power v. Manhart	435 U.S. 702	1978
Dept. of Revenue v. Ass'n of Wash. Stevedoring Cos.	435 U.S. 734	1978
First Nat'l Bank v. Bellotti	435 U.S. 765	1978
Landmark Communications, Inc. v. Virginia	435 U.S. 829	1978
United States v. MacDonald	435 U.S. 850	1978
Bracy v. United States	435 U.S. 1301	1978
Vetterli v. C.D. Cal.	435 U.S. 1304	1978
