= List of United States Supreme Court cases, volume 573 =

This is a list of all the United States Supreme Court cases from volume 573 of the United States Reports:

Case name	Citation	Date decided
CTS Corp. v. Waldburger	573 U.S. 1	June 9, 2014
North Carolina’s statute of repose is not preempted by the Comprehensive Environmental Response, Compensation, and Liability Act of 1980, which instead only preempts state statutes of limitations on bringing state-law environmental tort cases.
Executive Benefits Ins. Agency v. Arkison	573 U.S. 25	June 9, 2014
Under Stern v. Marshall, when a bankruptcy court does not have subject matter jurisdiction over a proceeding, the bankruptcy court may still hear the case and issue proposed findings to be reviewed de novo by a federal district court.
Scialabba v. de Osorio	573 U.S. 41	June 9, 2014
Lawful residents in the United States who turned twenty-one while their visa applications were being processed could not retain their original application date after "aging out" of eligibility for child-visas.
POM Wonderful LLC v. Coca-Cola Co.	573 U.S. 102	June 12, 2014
Reversed and remanded. Neither the Lanham Act nor the Food, Drug, and Cosmetic Act, in express terms, forbids or limits private Lanham Act claims challenging labels that are regulated by the other Act.
Clark v. Rameker	573 U.S. 122	June 12, 2014
Funds held in inherited Individual Retirement Accounts are not "retirement funds" and are not exempt from the bankruptcy estate.
Republic of Argentina v. NML Capital, Ltd.	573 U.S. 134	June 16, 2014
No provision in the FSIA immunizes a foreign-sovereign judgment debtor from post judgment discovery of information concerning its extraterritorial assets.
Susan B. Anthony List v. Driehaus	573 U.S. 149	June 16, 2014
Pre-enforcement legal challenges have Article III standing when the petitioners' prospect of injury is imminent.
Abramski v. United States	573 U.S. 169	June 16, 2014
A person who buys a gun on someone else's behalf while falsely claiming that it is for himself makes a material misrepresentation that violates federal law because it concerns "information required by [Chapter 44 of Title 18 of the United States Code] to be kept" in the dealer's records.
Alice Corp. v. CLS Bank Int'l	573 U.S. 208	June 19, 2014
Merely requiring generic computer implementation fails to transform an abstract idea into a patent-eligible invention.
Lane v. Franks	573 U.S. 228	June 19, 2014
Government employee speech that is made during trial is protected citizen speech, and the employee cannot be fired for comments made in that setting.
United States v. Clarke	573 U.S. 248	June 19, 2014
A taxpayer who wants to question Internal Revenue Service agents about their motives for issuing a summons may do so if they can point to "specific facts or circumstances plausibly raising an inference of bad faith."
Halliburton Co. v. Erica P. John Fund, Inc.	573 U.S. 258	June 23, 2014
Securities fraud defendants must be afforded an opportunity to rebut the presumption of reliance before class certification with evidence of a lack of price impact.
Utility Air Regulatory Group v. EPA	573 U.S. 302	June 23, 2014
(1) The Clean Air Act neither compels nor permits EPA to adopt an interpretation of the Act requiring a source to obtain a PSD or Title V permit on the sole basis of its potential greenhouse-gas emissions. (2) EPA reasonably interpreted the Act to require sources that would need permits based on their emission of conventional pollutants to comply with BACT for greenhouse gases.
Loughrin v. United States	573 U.S. 351	June 23, 2014
A conviction of the crime of knowingly executing a scheme to obtain property owned by, or under the custody of, a bank "by means of false or fraudulent pretenses," does not require the government to prove that a defendant intended to defraud a financial institution.
Riley v. California	573 U.S. 373	June 25, 2014
Police generally may not, without a warrant, search digital information on a cell phone seized from an individual who has been arrested.
Fifth Third Bancorp v. Dudenhoeffer	573 U.S. 409	June 25, 2014
There is no statutory basis for a 'presumption of prudence' test under ERISA. ESOP fiduciaries share the same duty of care as non-ESOP fiduciaries.
ABC v. Aereo, Inc.	573 U.S. 431	June 25, 2014
Aereo's retransmission of television broadcasts was a "public performance" of the networks' copyrighted work. The Copyright Act of 1976 forbids such performances without the permission of the holder of the copyright.
McCullen v. Coakley	573 U.S. 464	June 26, 2014
The provisions of the Reproductive Health Care Facilities Act limiting protesting within 35 feet of an abortion clinic violate the Free Speech Clause of the First Amendment.
NLRB v. Canning	573 U.S. 513	June 26, 2014
1. The Recess Appointments Clause empowers the President to fill any existing vacancy during any recess—intra-session or inter-session—of sufficient length.; 2. For purposes of the Recess Appointment Clause, the Senate is in session when it says that it is if, under its own rules, it retains the capacity to transact business.
Harris v. Quinn	573 U.S. 616	June 30, 2014
The First Amendment prohibits the collection of an agency fee from Rehabilitation Program PAs who do not want to join or support the union.
Burwell v. Hobby Lobby Stores, Inc.	573 U.S. 682	June 30, 2014
As applied to privately held for-profit corporations, a contraceptive mandate under the Department of Health and Human Services regulations violate the Religious Freedom Restoration Act of 1993 because they are substantial burdens under that law. Assuming that guaranteeing cost-free access to the four challenged contraceptive methods is a compelling governmental interest, the government must show that such a mandate is the least restrictive means of furthering that interest.
