= 1881 Colorado state capital referendum =

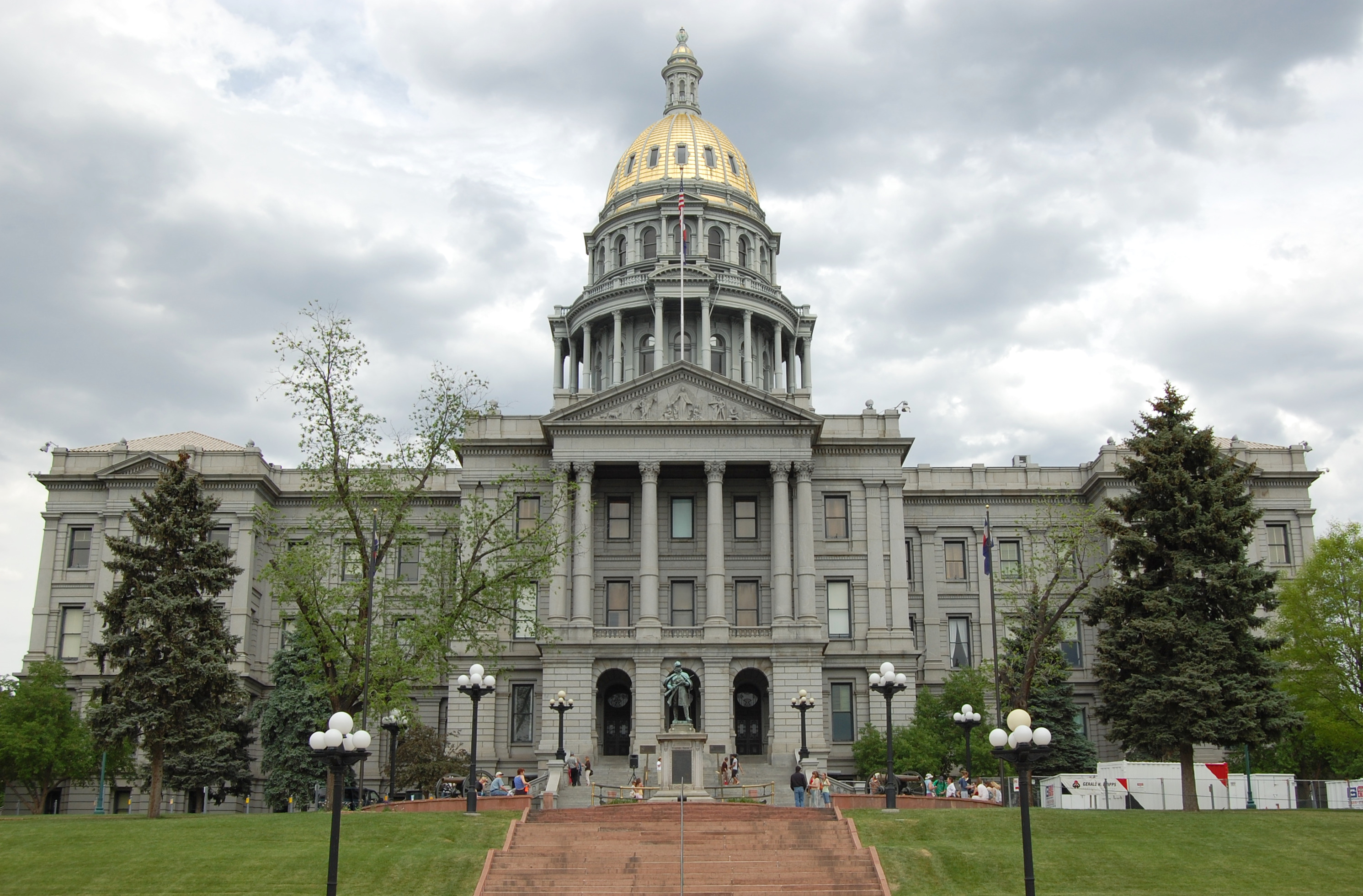
The Colorado State Capitol in Denver was finished in 1908.

The choice of the permanent capital of the U.S. state of Colorado was put to a popular vote in 1881. The cities in active contention were: Denver, Del Norte, Pueblo, Colorado Springs, Canon City, and Salida. The City of Denver, which had been the temporary capital since Colorado became a state in 1876, was chosen by 66 percent of voters.

== Background ==
Although Denver City was always the largest town in the Territory of Colorado since its recognition in 1861, and then the state, admitted to the union in 1876, there were always those in the state who opposed putting the capital in Denver. The first meeting of the Colorado territorial legislature, held in Denver in 1861, chose Colorado City (now part of Colorado Springs) as the capital. But when the legislature met in Colorado City for the first time in 1862, the facilities were so inadequate that after five days, the delegates voted to adjourn and reconvene in Denver. But when they reconvened in Denver, they chose not to stay there, and named Golden as the territorial capital. Although Golden was officially the territorial capital, the legislature often met in Denver, because it was more of a city. In 1867, the legislature voted to move the state government to Denver.

Following 1867 were years of stalemate. Although Denver had enough influence to prevent the removal of the acting capital from Denver, there was also enough opposition to prevent it from being designated as the permanent capital. When Colorado drafted a constitution for admission as a state in 1876, the framers feared that if the state constitution designated any city as the permanent state capital, it would arouse enough opposition that the voters would not ratify the constitution. To solve the dilemma, the Colorado state constitution kicked the problem down the road by providing that a permanent state capital would be chosen by statewide popular vote five years later, in 1881.

== The contenders ==
Although Denver was a transportation hub, and had more than twice the population of the next-largest city in Colorado, four other cities put themselves forward as sites for the capital. Denver's rivals hoped to use antipathy toward Denver to have themselves named as the capital.

Some of the larger towns in Colorado did not mount active campaigns for the capital. Leadville, which in 1880 census was the second-most populous town in Colorado with a population of 14,820, showed no interest in becoming state capital. Neither did Silver Cliff, then Colorado's third-largest with a population of 5,040. Golden, which had hosted the territorial government from 1862 to 1867, did not try to win back the capital in 1881.

=== Denver ===
Denver had grown considerably since it became the temporary territorial capital. It grew from 2,360 people in 1870 to 35,629 in 1880. The growth had been considerably aided by the establishment of a railroad connection in 1870, from Denver eastward, by the Kansas Pacific Railroad. This early rail connection made Denver the hub for movement of people and supplies to and from other points in Colorado. Denver was far larger than any of its rivals for state capital. Denver had enjoyed the economic stimulus of hosting the state government, and was eager to make it permanent. It had the advantage of being by far the largest town in Colorado. Committees were formed to visit other parts of the state promoting Denver as the capital, and assuring other cities that Denver wanted only the capital, and in return, Denver would support the location of other institutions, such as the university and the school of mines, outside of Denver.

Businessman Henry Brown offered to donate ten acres near downtown Denver for a new state capitol building, if Denver were chosen to have it. Denver supporters hailed the offer, and noted that the tract as an ideal spot, with a grand westward vista toward the mountains. Detractors noted that Brown owned more real estate in the vicinity, which would jump in value if the state capitol building were to be nearby.

=== Colorado Springs ===
Colorado Springs was at the time the fourth most-populous town in Colorado, with 4,226 inhabitants. Founded in 1871, it was growing rapidly, and touted its more genteel atmosphere compared to Denver. Supporters noted that most older states had wisely located their capitals away from large commercial cities. Optimism took hold of the real estate market, and months before the referendum, lots near the proposed site of the capitol building in Colorado Springs sold "at remarkably large prices."

=== Pueblo ===
In 1880, Pueblo had 3,217 inhabitants, not large enough to put it in the top five most populous towns in Colorado. But Pueblo had once come close to becoming the territorial capital. In 1874, the Colorado territorial house had passed a bill to make Pueblo the capital, but the measure was not passed by the territorial senate. The Pueblo Chieftain maintained that Pueblo was the most pleasant city to place the capital, and had plenty of good hotels and restaurants to satisfy the legislators.

=== Canon City ===
Canon City had a population of 1,501 in the 1880 census. It was principally a supply point on the Arkansas River for the mines and oil field. It promoted itself as having the most pleasant climate in the state. It was awarded the territorial prison after losing the contest for the Colorado state capital.

=== Salida ===
Salida had been founded just the preceding year, and had missed the 1880 census. The campaign for state capital consisted of editorials in Salida's weekly newspaper, the Mountain Mail. The Mail printed a distorted map of Colorado showing Salida in the exact geographical center.

== Results ==
The referendum was held on 8 November 1881. A total of 45,497 votes were counted. In each city vying for state capital, lopsided majorities voted for their hometowns. In Pueblo County, 2,039 voted for Pueblo, and just 44 for other towns. Arapahoe County, of which Denver was then the county seat, held off releasing its count until nearly all of the other counties had reported, counted 8,839 votes for Denver, which were 99.8 percent of the 8,857 ballots counted. Denver won on the first ballot, thus avoiding a runoff vote.

Choice	Votes	%
Denver	30,248	66.48
Pueblo	6,047	13.29
Colorado Springs	4,790	10.53
Canon City	2,788	6.13
Salida	695	1.53
Lake City	46	0.10
South Pueblo	42	0.09
Trinidad	40	0.09
Ophir	23	0.05
Saguache	11	0.02
Greeley	10	0.02
Silver Plume	9	0.02
Other cities	748	1.64
Total	45,497	100

== Reactions ==
Denver was widely accused of buying votes, and bribing newspaper editors to back it for the state capital.

The Colorado Springs Gazette decried the "terrible political contest in which fraud, corruption and dishonor played so important a part."

The editor of the Salida Mountain Mail congratulated Denver on its victory, and noted that Denver was a beautiful city that deserved the capital. The editor confessed that the campaign for Salida was just a publicity stunt to bring the town to public attention, and that it had succeeded. He wrote that although Denver had spent "thousands of dollars, perhaps hundreds of thousands" bribing newspaper editors and hiring "bummers" to vote for Denver, the money had performed a public service by supporting newspapers and indigent citizens across the state.

The Pueblo Chieftain decided that the town was better off without the capital:

We may have missed the state capital, but we have also missed the corrupting influences of a legislative lobby and our wives and our tender maidens will not be exposed to the insidious wiles of the polished member from the rural districts.

=== Historical myths ===
Since 1881, local myths have grown that various other towns in Colorado were in serious contention to become state capital, among them: Central City, Cripple Creek, Fountain, Golden, Laporte, Leadville, and Silver Cliff. The town of Cripple Creek was not even in existence until 1892, eleven years after the referendum.

Webpages about Central City, Laporte, and Silver Cliff have claimed that not only were those towns in serious contention to be the state capital, but that each town lost the referendum to Denver by a single vote.

Did you know Central City lost the vote to be Colorado's state capital by one vote? Yep

In 1881, in a state election held to determine the location of the state capital, Denver won over Laporte by a single vote:

In 1881, a state election was held to determine the location of the state capital. Denver won over LaPorte by one vote.

When Silver Cliff was a booming mining town (if only one vote had been cast the other way, Silver Cliff would now be the state capitol and not Denver).
