= Meyer v. Grant =

- Supreme Court of the United States

Argued April 25, 1988 Decided June 6, 1988
- Full case name: Meyer, Colorado Secretary of State, et al. v. Grant et al.
- Citations: 486 U.S. 414 (more) 108 S. Ct. 1886; 100 L. Ed. 2d 425; 1988 U.S. LEXIS 2489
- Argument: Oral argument

Case history
- Prior: Judgment for defendants, statute upheld, 84-JM-1207 (D. Colo.); affirmed, 741 F.2d 1210, 1211 (10th Cir. 1984); granted rehearing, vacated panel opinion, 780 F.2d 848 (10th Cir. 1985); reversed and remanded, 828 F.2d 1446 (10th Cir. 1987); probable jurisdiction noted, 484 U.S. 1024 (1988).

Holding
- Paid petition circulation is protected by the First and Fourteenth Amendments.

Court membership
- Chief Justice William Rehnquist Associate Justices William J. Brennan Jr. · Byron White; Thurgood Marshall · Harry Blackmun; John P. Stevens · Sandra Day O'Connor; Antonin Scalia · Anthony Kennedy

Case opinion
- Majority: Stevens, joined by unanimous

Laws applied
- U.S. Const. amends. I, XIV; Colo. Const., Art. V, 1; Colo. Rev. Stat. 1-40-101 to 1-40-119 (1980 and Supp. 1987)

Meyer v. Grant, 486 U.S. 414 (1988), was an important decision by the United States Supreme Court on paid petition circulation. Colorado was one of several states with a process for citizens to propose initiatives for the ballot, which if passed became law. One of the requirements was to get the signatures of a significant number of registered Colorado electors. Colorado prohibited initiative sponsors from paying for the circulation of these petitions. The state argued this was necessary to "protect[...] the integrity of the initiative."

In 1984, Coloradans for Free Enterprise, an interest group, proposed an initiative to deregulate the motor industry by removing it from the jurisdiction of the Public Utilities Commission. After the title and summary were approved by the state, they began unpaid circulation. They eventually concluded that they would not be able to get the 46,737 required signatures by the deadline. They then filed suit under 42 U.S.C. 1983 against the Secretary of State of Colorado, Natalie Meyer, and the Attorney General of Colorado, Duane Woodard, in their official capacities. The plaintiffs alleged that the Colorado statute infringed on their First Amendment rights. The district court, with Judge John P. Moore sitting, declined to overturn the law, finding that "the evidence did not indicate that plaintiffs were prevented in any way from espousing their cause simply because they could not obtain paid petition circulators." The plaintiffs appealed this decision to the United States Court of Appeals for the Tenth Circuit. Judges James E. Barrett and William Doyle affirmed in a panel opinion. The court granted a rehearing en banc at the plaintiff's request, and vacated the panel's opinion. The full court of appeals reversed and remanded, determining that Colorado's law "impede[d] the sponsors' opportunity to disseminate their views to the public."

The state appealed to the Supreme Court, which heard oral argument on April 25, 1988. The Supreme Court unanimously affirmed the decision, ruling that "the State has failed to demonstrate that it is necessary to burden appellees' ability to communicate their message in order to meet its concerns."

== Aftermath ==
In 2001, a federal court upheld a North Dakota law prohibiting pay-per signatures.

Pay-Per-Signature laws have been held unconstitutional in Idaho, Maine, Mississippi, and Washington.

== See also ==
- Buckley v. American Constitutional Law Foundation, Inc.
- List of United States Supreme Court cases, volume 486
