= Corporation of Presiding Bishop of Church of Jesus Christ of Latter-day Saints v. Amos =

Corporation of Presiding Bishop v. Amos
- Supreme Court of the United States

Argued March 31, 1987 Decided June 24, 1987
- Full case name: Corporation of the Presiding Bishop of the Church of Jesus Christ of Latter-Day Saints v. Amos
- Docket no.: 86-179
- Citations: 483 U.S. 327 (more) 107 S. Ct. 2862; 97 L. Ed. 2d 273
- Argument: Oral argument

Holding
- Permitting religious organizations to discriminate on the basis of religion in any employment activity pertaining to the religious organization—whether the job itself is secular or religious—is constitutional.

Court membership
- Chief Justice William Rehnquist Associate Justices William J. Brennan Jr. · Byron White; Thurgood Marshall · Harry Blackmun; Lewis F. Powell Jr. · John P. Stevens; Sandra Day O'Connor · Antonin Scalia

Case opinions
- Majority: White, joined by Rehnquist, Powell, Stevens, Scalia
- Concurrence: Brennan (in judgment), joined by Marshall
- Concurrence: Blackmun (in judgment)
- Concurrence: O'Connor (in judgment)

Laws applied
- U.S. Const. amend. I

Corporation of Presiding Bishop v. Amos, 483 U.S. 327 (1987), is a United States Supreme Court case in which the court decided that the exemption of religious organizations from the prohibition of religious discrimination in employment in Title VII of the Civil Rights Act is constitutional. Appellee Arthur Frank Mayson worked for 16 years in an organization operated by the Church of Jesus Christ of Latter-day Saints (LDS Church). He was terminated from employment when he "failed to qualify for a temple recommend, that is, a certificate that he is a member of the Church and eligible to attend its temples." He filed suit in district court, arguing that his firing violated discrimination on the basis of religion in Title VII of the Civil Rights Act. The district court agreed. The case was appealed directly to the Supreme Court (under Title 28 U.S.C. § 1252). The Supreme Court reversed, holding that Title VII's exemption of religious organizations from the prohibition on religious discrimination, even in secular activities, did not violate the First Amendment.

== History and District Court ruling ==
In the early 1980s, five individuals were terminated from employment at Deseret Gymnasium, a non-profit facility in Salt Lake City, Utah, which was operated by the Corporation of the Presiding Bishop of the LDS Church. The reason for termination was "solely because each of them was unable or refused to satisfy the worthiness requirements for a temple recommend from the Church of Jesus Christ of Latter-Day Saints." The individuals filed suit, alleging impermissible discrimination on the basis of religion in violation of § 703 of the Civil Rights Act of 1964. They argued that section 703 stated, "It shall be an unlawful employment practice for an employer—(1) to fail or refuse to hire or to discharge any individual, or otherwise to discriminate against any individual with respect to his compensation, terms, conditions, or privileges of employment, because of such individual’s race, color, religion, sex, or national origin," with the exception that "it shall not be an unlawful employment practice for an employer to hire and employ employees . . . on the basis of his religion, sex, or national origin in those certain instances where religion, sex, or national origin is a bona fide occupational qualification reasonably necessary to the normal operation of that particular business or enterprise."

The LDS Church argued that section 702 protected the organization in its employment decisions, because the act included an exemption: "This subchapter shall not apply to an employer with respect to the employment of aliens outside any State, or to a religious corporation, association, educational institution, or society with respect to the employment of individuals of a particular religion to perform work connected with the carrying on by such corporation, association, educational institution, or society of its activities." The individuals responded that permitting a religious organization to discriminate "against employees performing secular, non-religious jobs on the basis of religion would violate the establishment clause of the [F]irst [A]mendment."

The district court concluded that the individuals were engaged in non-religious activity but noted that section 702 protected religious organizations in their employment decisions related to any position in the organization, no matter how religious or nonreligious the activity was. The court then addressed whether the exemption violated the Establishment Clause by using the Lemon test. The court ruled that the exemption permitted by section 702 violated the second prong of the Lemon test (principal effect not advancing or inhibiting religion) because the section "singles out religious entities for a benefit, rather than benefiting a broad grouping of which religious organizations are only a part" and "burdens the free exercise rights of employees of religious institutions who work in nonreligious jobs."

== Supreme Court rulings ==
=== Majority opinion ===
In reversing the district court on the supposition that section 702 singled out religious entities for a benefit, the Court stated that it had "never indicated that statutes that give special consideration to religious groups are per se invalid" and that "[w]here, as here, government acts with the proper purpose of lifting a regulation that burdens the exercise of religion, we see no reason to require that the exemption come packaged with benefits to secular entities."

In addressing the issue of a free exercise burden of employees, the Court noted that "it is a significant burden on a religious organization to require it, on pain of substantial liability, to predict which of its activities a secular court will consider religious." Further, although the appellee's "freedom of choice in religious matters was impinged upon, [] it was the Church (through the COP and the CPB), and not the Government, who put him to the choice of changing his religious practices or losing his job."

The Court also reiterated, "A law is not unconstitutional simply because it allows churches to advance religion, which is their very purpose. For a law to have forbidden "effects" under Lemon, it must be fair to say that the government itself has advanced religion through its own activities and influence. . . . [W]e do not see how any advancement of religion achieved by the Gymnasium can be fairly attributed to the Government, as opposed to the Church."

=== Concurrence in judgment by Brennan and Marshall ===
Justices Brennan and Marshall agreed with the court on the significant burden issue, stating that nonprofit organizations should be categorically exempt from religious discrimination issues because the prospect that a court would attempt to determine whether or not the nonprofit activity was reasonably religious or related to the religion's purposes would "chill" religious activity.

=== Concurrences in judgment by Blackmun and O'Connor ===
Though he wrote a brief separate opinion, Blackmun stated he basically agreed with O'Connor's reasoning that the Court's majority opinion could be read too deferentially toward religion, and that though in this particular case the judgment was correct, there was concern that profit-making enterprises run by religions may be improperly exempted from religious discrimination laws.

== Implications ==
According to Google Scholar search results, the Court's ruling (or one of the concurring opinions) has been relied on in about 2,700 court cases as of June 2019, indicating that this case has had substantial impact on the development of First Amendment religion case law. The case is also cited in thousands of articles and books on case law.
