= Susan B. Anthony List v. Driehaus =

- Supreme Court of the United States

Argued April 22, 2014 Decided June 16, 2014
- Full case name: Susan B. Anthony List, et al., Petitioners v. Steven Driehaus, et al.
- Docket no.: 13-193
- Citations: 573 U.S. 149 (more) 134 S. Ct. 2334; 189 L. Ed. 2d 246
- Argument: Oral argument
- Opinion announcement: Opinion announcement

Case history
- Prior: Motion to dismiss granted, 805 F. Supp. 2d 412 (S.D. Ohio 2011); affirmed, 525 F. App'x 415 (6th Cir. 2013); cert. granted, 571 U.S. 1118 (2014).
- Subsequent: On remand, 45 F. Supp. 3d 765 (S.D. Ohio 2014); affirmed, 814 F.3d 466 (6th Cir. 2016).

Holding
- Pre-enforcement legal challenges have Article III standing when the petitioners' prospect of injury is imminent.

Court membership
- Chief Justice John Roberts Associate Justices Antonin Scalia · Anthony Kennedy; Clarence Thomas · Ruth Bader Ginsburg; Stephen Breyer · Samuel Alito; Sonia Sotomayor · Elena Kagan

Case opinion
- Majority: Thomas, joined by unanimous

Laws applied
- U.S. Const. Art. III

Susan B. Anthony List v. Driehaus, 573 U.S. 149 (2014), is a United States Supreme Court case.

== Synopsis of case ==
In the 2010 campaign, Susan B. Anthony List purchased billboard advertisements in the district of former U.S. Representative Steve Driehaus of Ohio that showed a photo of Driehaus and said, "Shame on Steve Driehaus! Driehaus voted FOR taxpayer-funded abortion." The advertisement referred to Driehaus's vote in favor of the health care overhaul bill.

Susan B. Anthony List takes the position that the health care legislation allows for taxpayer-funded abortion, a claim which was ruled by a judge to be factually incorrect. In response, Driehaus, who represented the heavily pro-life 1st congressional district of Ohio, filed a complaint with the Ohio Elections Commission (OEC), stating that the advertisements were false and violated Ohio election law. The OEC ruled in Driehaus' favor in a probable cause hearing on October 14, 2010.

In response, the SBA List asked a federal judge to issue an injunction against the OEC on the grounds that the law at issue stifles free speech and that its ads were based on the group's own interpretation of the law. The American Civil Liberties Union of Ohio filed an 18-page amicus brief on the SBA List's behalf, arguing that the Ohio law in question is "unconstitutionally vague" and has a "chilling" effect on the SBA List's right to freedom of speech. A federal judge rejected the SBA List's federal lawsuit on abstention grounds and allowed Driehaus's OEC complaint to move forward.

After the OEC complaint was filed, the SBA List began airing a radio ad in Driehaus's district in which Marjorie Dannenfelser stated that the group "[would] not be silenced or intimidated" by Driehaus's legal action. Driehaus ended up losing his seat to Steve Chabot in the November election. Driehaus then sued the SBA List in a second case on December 3, 2010, accusing the organization of defamation that caused him a "loss of livelihood". The SBA List continued seeking to have the law in question overturned; the ACLU joined in the organization's fight against the law.

On August 1, 2011, Judge Timothy Black dismissed the SBA List's challenge to the Ohio law, holding that the federal court lacked jurisdiction since the billboards were never erected and the OEC never made a final ruling and denied a motion for summary judgment by SBA List in the defamation case, allowing Driehaus's defamation claims regarding other SBA List statements to go forward. Black also required that SBA List stop claiming on its website that the Patient Protection and Affordable Care Act subsidized abortion, because it did not directly mention abortion. SBA List argued that its statements were opinions and were thus protected, but the court rejected this argument given that SBA List itself had claimed that this was a "fact." On August 19, 2011, the SBA List appealed the decision on the Ohio law to the Sixth Circuit Court of Appeals. In May 2013, the Sixth Circuit Court of Appeals ruled that the SBA List could not challenge the law under the First Amendment.

== Supreme Court ==
On August 9, 2013, the SBA List petitioned the United States Supreme Court to review the law. On January 10, 2014, the Supreme Court accepted the case. The Court heard the case on April 22, 2014.

Several amici curiae filed briefs.

Justice Clarence Thomas, on behalf of a unanimous Supreme Court, reversed the judgement of the two lower courts and remanded the case to the lower courts so that the SBA List could pursue its constitutional rights against the Ohio law. The Supreme Court ruled on whether SBA List could move forward with its challenge to the law, given that the proceedings against it had been stopped by former Congressman Driehaus. Thomas wrote that the "Petitioners have alleged a credible threat of enforcement of the Ohio law". Thomas wrote that in the case there was a credible threat of harm in the form of a burden imposed on the electoral speech, where SBA List is being forced, even if they ultimately prevail, to divert significant time and resources to hire legal counsel and respond to discovery requests in the crucial days before an election.

== Law struck down by district court ==
After the Supreme Court decision, the SBA List challenged the constitutionality of the Ohio law in federal court in the United States District Court for the Southern District of Ohio in Susan B. Anthony List v. Ohio Elections Commission. On September 11, 2014, Judge Timothy Black struck down the law as unconstitutional. Black said in his ruling, "We do not want the government (i.e., the Ohio Elections Commission) deciding what is political truth — for fear that the government might persecute those who criticize it. Instead, in a democracy, the voters should decide."

== See also ==
- List of United States Supreme Court cases, volume 573
- James Bopp
- Clapper v. Amnesty International USA (2013)
