= Rotary International v. Rotary Club of Duarte =

- Supreme Court of the United States

Argued March 30, 1987 Decided May 4, 1987
- Full case name: Board of Directors, Rotary International v. Rotary Club of Duarte
- Docket no.: 86-421
- Citations: 481 U.S. 537 (more)
- Argument: Oral argument

Holding
- The California law requiring California Rotary Clubs to admit women members did not violate Rotary International's First Amendment rights of association.

Court membership
- Chief Justice William Rehnquist Associate Justices William J. Brennan Jr. · Byron White; Thurgood Marshall · Harry Blackmun; Lewis F. Powell Jr. · John P. Stevens; Sandra Day O'Connor · Antonin Scalia

Case opinions
- Majority: Powell, joined by Marshall, Brennan, White, Rehnquist, and Stevens
- Concurrence: Scalia

Laws applied
- U.S. Const. amend. I

Rotary International v. Rotary Club of Duarte, 481 U.S. 537 (1987), was a United States Supreme Court case in which the court unanimously held that the Unruh Civil Rights Act does not violate the First Amendment by requiring California Rotary Clubs to admit women.

== Background ==
Rotary International is a nonprofit organization with local Rotary Clubs. At the time of the case, Rotary's constitution and bylaws explicitly limited membership to men, though women were permitted to attend some activities.

In September 1977, the Rotary Club of Duarte, California, admitted three women as active members. Rotary International's board of directors revoked the club's charter in 1978 and terminated its membership in the organization. The Duarte Club and two of its women members filed suit. They alleged that the revocation violated the Unruh Civil Rights Act (California Civil Code § 51), which prohibits discrimination based on sex, race, color, religion, ancestry, national origin, or physical disability in all "business establishments" within the state.

A California Superior Court ruled in favor of Rotary International, finding that neither Rotary International nor the Duarte Club qualified as a "business establishment" under the Unruh Act. On appeal, the California Court of Appeal reversed and held that both Rotary International and the Duarte Club were business establishments.

Rotary International appealed to the U.S. Supreme Court.

== Opinion of the Court ==
The Supreme Court affirmed the California Court of Appeal's ruling in a 7–0 decision on May 4, 1987. Justices Blackmun and O'Connor did not participate.

Justice Powell, writing for the majority, held that applying the Unruh Act to require the admission of women into California Rotary Clubs did not violate the First Amendment. The Court relied on Roberts v. United States Jaycees (1984) and analyzed the claims under the freedoms of intimate association and expressive association.

The Court found that Rotary Clubs did not foster the kind of personal, selective relationships protected by the First Amendment. On expressive association, the Court concluded that admitting women would not significantly impair these goals or force the organization to abandon its membership system.

Justice Scalia concurred in the judgment without writing a separate opinion.

== See also ==
- Boy Scouts of America v. Dale
- Freedom of association
