= List of United States Supreme Court cases, volume 454 =

This is a list of all the United States Supreme Court cases from volume 454 of the United States Reports:

Case name	Citation	Date decided
Duckworth v. Serrano	454 U.S. 1	1981
Chardon v. Fernandez	454 U.S. 6	1981
Jago v. van Curen	454 U.S. 14	1981
Fed. Election Comm'n v. Democratic Senatorial Campaign Comm.	454 U.S. 27	1981
Ridgway v. Ridgway	454 U.S. 46	1981
Leeke v. Timmerman	454 U.S. 83	1981
California ex rel. Cooper v. Mitchell Bros. Santa Ana Theater	454 U.S. 90	1981
Fair Assessment in Real Estate Ass'n, Inc. v. McNary	454 U.S. 100	1981
Weinberger v. Cath. Action	454 U.S. 139	1981
Watt v. Energy Action Ed. Found.	454 U.S. 151	1981
NLRB v. Hendricks Cnty. Rural Elec. Membership Corp.	454 U.S. 170	1981
Ralston v. Robinson	454 U.S. 201	1981
Piper Aircraft Co. v. Reyno	454 U.S. 235	1981
Widmar v. Vincent	454 U.S. 263	1981
Citizens Against Rent Control/Coalition for Fair Housing v. City of Berkeley	454 U.S. 290	1981
Polk Cnty. v. Dodson	454 U.S. 312	1981
Harris v. Rivera	454 U.S. 339	1981
Tennessee v. Arkansas	454 U.S. 351	1981
Cent. Tr. Co. v. Official Creditors' Comm.	454 U.S. 354	1982
Boag v. MacDougall	454 U.S. 364	1982
Hutto v. Davis	454 U.S. 370	1982
Donovan v. Richland Cnty. Ass'n	454 U.S. 389	1982
Blanding v. DuBose	454 U.S. 393	1982
Bonanno Linen Serv., Inc. v. NLRB	454 U.S. 404	1982
Cabell v. Chavez-Salido	454 U.S. 432	1982
Valley Forge Christian College v. Americans United for Separation of Church & State	454 U.S. 464	1982
Texaco, Inc. v. Short	454 U.S. 516	1982
United States v. Clark	454 U.S. 555	1982
Spaziano v. Florida	454 U.S. 1037	1981
Jones v. United States (1983)	454 U.S. 1141	1982
Mori v. Boilermakers	454 U.S. 1301	1981
Clements v. Logan	454 U.S. 1304	1981
