= Presbyterian Church v. Hull Church =

- Supreme Court of the United States

Argued December 9–10, 1968 Decided January 27, 1969
- Full case name: Presbyterian Church in the United States, et al. v. Mary Elizabeth Blue Hull Memorial Presbyterian Church, et al.
- Citations: 393 U.S. 440 (more) 89 S. Ct. 601; 21 L. Ed. 2d 658; 1969 U.S. LEXIS 2702

Case history
- Prior: Certiorari granted, 390 U.S. 440 (1968)

Holding
- The First Amendment, as applied through the Fourteenth Amendment, bars the state from passing judgment in theological matters when judging property disputes involving religious organizations. Invalidates so-called "departure-from-doctrine" theory.

Court membership
- Chief Justice Earl Warren Associate Justices Hugo Black · William O. Douglas; John M. Harlan II · William J. Brennan Jr. Potter Stewart · Byron White; Abe Fortas · Thurgood Marshall

Case opinions
- Majority: Brennan, joined by unanimous
- Concurrence: Harlan

Laws applied
- U.S. Const. amends. I, XIV

Presbyterian Church v. Hull Church, 393 U.S. 440 (1969), was a United States Supreme Court case involving the secession of two local churches, including Hull Memorial Presbyterian Church, from the parent body Presbyterian Church in the United States because, they claimed, the Church had departed from its original doctrinal tenets. The Court ruled that the state could not pass judgment concerning religious doctrine or church law.

== Background ==
In 1966 the sessions of two congregations of the Presbyterian Church in the United States voted to secede from the parent organization. They were upset over the parent body's decisions to ordain women, to remain within the National Council of Churches, its position with regard to the Vietnam War and other social issues, its embrace of "neo-orthodox" and alleged denial of the Holy Trinity and certain Sunday School texts. Subsequently the Presbytery of Savannah appointed an Administrative Commission to resolve the dispute. When the two insurgent churches remained intransigent, the Presbytery attempted to take over the seceding churches' properties until new leadership could be found. The seceding churches then filed suit in the Superior Court of Chatham County to enjoin representatives of Presbytery from trespassing on their properties. In response, the denomination moved to dismiss that injunction and filed a cross-injunction on its own behalf claiming that the state had no authority to determine whether the general church had departed from its tenets of faith and practice. The suits were consolidated for trial.

At the trial the case was decided under the doctrine of "implied trust" and "departure from doctrine", which meant that the jury was instructed to render a verdict whether the general church had violated the trust of its members by departing fundamentally from its original tenets. The jury found for the seceding churches, as did the Supreme Court of Georgia.
