= Watson v. Jones =

- Supreme Court of the United States

Argued March 9–10, 1871 Decided April 15, 1872
- Full case name: Watson v. Jones
- Citations: 80 U.S. 679 (more) 13 Wall. 679; [This hyperlink is to a defective "Justia" copy of Watson that omits much of p. 722] 20 L. Ed. 666; 1871 U.S. LEXIS 1383

Court membership
- Chief Justice Salmon P. Chase Associate Justices Samuel Nelson · Nathan Clifford; Noah H. Swayne · Samuel F. Miller; David Davis · Stephen J. Field; William Strong · Joseph P. Bradley

Case opinions
- Majority: Miller, joined by Chase, Nelson, Swayne, Field, Strong, Bradley
- Dissent: Clifford, joined by Davis

Watson v. Jones, 80 U.S. (13 Wall.) 679 (1871), is a United States Supreme Court case regarding the role of secular courts adjudicating ecclesiastical disputes. In Watson, the Court held that in adjudications of church property disputes: (1) courts cannot rule on the truth or falsity of a religious teaching, (2) where a previous authority structure existed before the dispute, courts should defer to the decision of that structure, and (3) in the absence of such an internal authority structure, courts should defer to the wishes of a majority of the congregation.

== Background ==
The case was based upon a dispute regarding the Walnut Street Presbyterian Church in Louisville, Kentucky (also known as the Third Presbyterian Church). Because the Walnut Street Presbyterian Church had a clear internal authority structure, the court granted control of the property to that group, even though it was only supported by a minority of the congregation.

Watson v. Jones was decided on common law grounds in a diversity action without explicit reliance on the First Amendment. A constitutionalization of the rule was made in Kedroff v. St. Nicholas Cathedral, in which the Court held unconstitutional a state statute that recognized the autonomy and authority of those North American branches of the Russian Orthodox Church which had declared their independence from the general church. Recognizing that Watson v. Jones had been decided on non-constitutional grounds, the Court thought nonetheless that the opinion "radiates . . . a spirit of freedom for religious organizations, and independence from secular control or manipulation—in short, power to decide for themselves, free from state interference, matters of church government as well as those of faith and doctrine." The power of civil courts to resolve church property disputes was severely circumscribed, the Court held, because to permit resolution of doctrinal disputes in court was to jeopardize First Amendment values. What a court must do, it was held, is to look at the church rules: if the church is a hierarchical one which reposes determination of ecclesiastical issues in a certain body, then the resolution by that body is determinative, while if the church is a congregational one prescribing action by a majority vote, then that determination will prevail. On the other hand, a court confronted with a church property dispute could apply "neutral principles of law, developed for use in all property disputes," when to do so would not require resolution of doctrinal issues. In a later case the Court elaborated on the limits of proper inquiry, holding that an argument over a matter of internal church government, the power to reorganize the dioceses of a hierarchical church in this country, was "at the core of ecclesiastical affairs" and a court could not interpret the church constitution to make an independent determination of the power but must defer to the interpretation of the body authorized to decide.

== Decision ==
Justice Miller, writing for the court, observed in dicta that the protection of religious liberty was not absolute because people were not entitled to "violate the laws of morality and property" or to "infringe personal rights." The court dealt with this idea directly later in an important case, Reynolds v. United States.
