= McDaniel v. Paty =

- Supreme Court of the United States

Argued December 5, 1977 Decided April 19, 1978
- Full case name: McDaniel v. Paty
- Citations: 435 U.S. 618 (more) 98 S. Ct. 1322; 55 L. Ed. 2d 593

Case history
- Prior: Paty v. McDaniel, 547 S.W.2d 897 (Tenn. 1977); probable jurisdiction noted, 432 U.S. 905 (1977).

Holding
- A state law that forbade ordained ministers from elected office is unconstitutional under the Free Exercise Clause.

Court membership
- Chief Justice Warren E. Burger Associate Justices William J. Brennan Jr. · Potter Stewart; Byron White · Thurgood Marshall; Harry Blackmun · Lewis F. Powell Jr. William Rehnquist · John P. Stevens

Case opinions
- Plurality: Burger, joined by Powell, Rehnquist, Stevens
- Concurrence: Brennan (in judgment), joined by Marshall
- Concurrence: Stewart (in judgment)
- Concurrence: White (in judgment)
- Blackmun took no part in the consideration or decision of the case.

Laws applied
- U.S. Const. amends. I

McDaniel v. Paty, 435 U.S. 618 (1978), was a United States Supreme Court case in which it held the Tennessee state law prohibiting religious ministers holding elected office violated the First and Fourteenth Amendments of the U.S. Constitution.

Paul A. McDaniel was a Baptist minister in Chattanooga, Tennessee, and a prominent activist. He filed as a candidate to be a delegate to the 1977 Tennessee State Constitutional Convention, but an opponent had successfully challenged his candidacy based on a state law that forbade ordained ministers from elected office.

== Background ==
Paul A. McDaniel was a Baptist minister in Chattanooga, Tennessee, who gained prominence in his lifetime as an activist within the community. He filed as a candidate to be a delegate to the 1977 Tennessee State Constitutional Convention. His opponent, Selma Cash Paty, successfully challenged his candidacy based on a state law that forbade ordained ministers from elected office.

== Supreme Court decision ==
In a unanimous 8–0 decision, the court ruled that the Tennessee state constitutional provision that prohibited clergy from serving in the state Legislature violated both the First and Fourteenth Amendments. A modified version of the statute, prohibiting "ministers of the Gospel" from serving in the Tennessee legislature, remains as Article IX, Section 1. of the Tennessee State Constitution. Though all concurred in the judgment, there were differences among the justices about the reasoning.

=== Plurality opinion ===
Ever since the Free Exercise Clause was incorporated against the states by Cantwell v. Connecticut the Court has recognized that the First Amendment protects religious beliefs absolutely.

Religious status does not receive the same absolute protection as beliefs under the First Amendment, the Court says. Quoting from Wisconsin v. Yoder the Court explains that "only those interests of the highest order...can overbalance legitimate claims to the free exercise of religion". Since the Tennessee law disqualified McDaniel because of "his status as a minister", his free exercise claim had to be balanced against the state interest "in maintaining the wall of separation between church and state".

The Tennessee Supreme Court had already decided that the state interest in preventing the establishment of religion and avoiding divisiveness overcame McDaniel's Free Exercise claim. The plurality disagreed:

The essence of the rationale underlying the Tennessee restriction on ministers is that if elected to public office they will necessarily exercise their powers and influence to promote the interests of one sect or thwart the interests of another, thus pitting one against the others, contrary to the anti-establishment principle with its command of neutrality. See Walz v. Tax Comm'n, 397 U. S. 664 (1970). However widely that view may have been held in the 18th century by many, including enlightened statesmen of that day, the American experience provides no persuasive support for the fear that clergymen in public office will be less careful of anti-establishment interests or less faithful to their oaths of civil office than their unordained counterparts.

The Court found that the Tennessee state constitutional provision "imposed an unconstitutional penalty upon appellant's exercise of his religious faith". Even though the state court applied Braunfeld v. Brown, the McDaniel plurality applied Sherbert v. Verner, and three Justices noted that Braunfeld was overruled "to the extent that Braunfeld conflicts with Sherbert". (Note: Braunfeld has not been formally overruled.)

=== Concurrences ===
Justice William J. Brennan in a separate concurring opinion was skeptical of the distinction between clerical status and religious belief. Justice Potter Stewart wrote that the distinction was "without constitutional significance".

== Legacy ==
The Tennessee Constitutional Amendment 4, or the Remove Religious Minister Disqualification Amendment, was proposed as a measure on the November 2022 ballot to remove this restriction. In accordance with state constitutional law, the proposed amendment was submitted to the state legislature in both the 2019–2020 and 2021–2022 sessions. The measure was ratified by the voters.
