= Ward v. Rock Against Racism =

- Supreme Court of the United States

Argued February 27, 1989 Decided June 22, 1989
- Full case name: Benjamin R. Ward, et al. v. Rock Against Racism
- Citations: 491 U.S. 781 (more) 109 S. Ct. 2746; 105 L. Ed. 2d 661; 1989 U.S. LEXIS 3129; 57 U.S.L.W. 4879

Case history
- Prior: Sound amplification rule preliminarily enjoined, Rock Against Racism v. Ward 636 F. Supp. 178 (S.D.N.Y. 1986); preliminary injunction vacated, rule upheld, 658 F. Supp. 1346 (S.D.N.Y. 1987); reversed, 848 F.2d 367 (2d Cir. 1988); certiorari granted, Ward v. Rock Against Racism, 488 U.S. 816 (1988).

Holding
- A regulation of the time, place, or manner of protected speech must be narrowly tailored to serve the government's legitimate content-neutral interests but does not need to be the least restrictive or the least-intrusive means of doing so.

Court membership
- Chief Justice William Rehnquist Associate Justices William J. Brennan Jr. · Byron White; Thurgood Marshall · Harry Blackmun; John P. Stevens · Sandra Day O'Connor; Antonin Scalia · Anthony Kennedy

Case opinions
- Majority: Kennedy, joined by Rehnquist, White, O'Connor, Scalia
- Concurrence: Blackmun
- Dissent: Marshall, joined by Brennan, Stevens

Ward v. Rock Against Racism, 491 U.S. 781 (1989), was a United States Supreme Court case.

In an opinion by Justice Kennedy, the Court rejected a First Amendment challenge to a New York City regulation that mandated the use of city-provided sound systems and technicians to control the volume of concerts in New York City's Central Park. The Court found that the city had a substantial interest in limiting excessive noise and the regulation was "content neutral". The court found that "narrow tailoring" would be satisfied if the regulation promoted a substantial government interest that would be achieved less effectively without the regulation.

Justices Marshall, Brennan, and Stevens dissented.

In his dissent, Marshall agreed with the majority that the government has a substantial interest in controlling noise but believed that it may not advance that interest by actually asserting control over the amplification equipment and thus over private expression itself. The government has an obligation to adopt the least intrusive restriction necessary to achieve its goals such as enforcing the noise ordinance that has already been adopted.
