= Arcara v. Cloud Books, Inc. =

- Supreme Court of the United States

Argued April 29, 1986 Decided July 7, 1986
- Full case name: Arcara, District Attorney of Erie County v. Cloud Books, Inc., DBA Village Book & News Store, et al.
- Docket no.: 85-437
- Citations: 478 U.S. 697 (more) 106 S. Ct. 3172
- Argument: Oral argument

Case history
- Prior: Denial of summary judgment affirmed, People ex rel. Arcara v. Cloud Books, Inc., 101 A.D.2d 163 (N.Y. App. Div. 1984); modified to grant partial summary judgment, 65 N.Y.2d 324, 480 N.E.2d 1089 (N.Y. 1985); cert. granted, 474 U.S. 978 (1985)
- Subsequent: People ex rel. Arcara v. Cloud Books, Inc., 68 N.Y.2d 553, 503 N.E.2d 492 (N.Y. 1986)

Holding
- The bookstore's closure did not violate the First Amendment as the activities for which it was closed were nonexpressive.

Court membership
- Chief Justice Warren E. Burger Associate Justices William J. Brennan Jr. · Byron White; Thurgood Marshall · Harry Blackmun; Lewis F. Powell Jr. · William Rehnquist; John P. Stevens · Sandra Day O'Connor

Case opinions
- Majority: Burger, joined by White, Powell, Rehnquist, Stevens, O'Connor
- Concurrence: O'Connor, joined by Stevens
- Dissent: Blackmun, joined by Brennan, Marshall

Laws applied
- U.S. Const. amend. I

Arcara v. Cloud Books, Inc., 478 U.S. 697 (1986), was a United States Supreme Court case about the First Amendment and whether freedom of speech was violated by shutting down a bookstore because of illicit sexual activities occurring there. The Court held that the closure was aimed at non-expressive activity and its incidental burden on speech was not subject to any First Amendment scrutiny.

In reaching its decision, the 6–3 majority identified two conditions when it would apply the First Amendment to incidental effects on speech: when the enforcement action is aimed at significantly expressive conduct, or when the law inevitably affects speech disproportionately. Neither condition was applicable to the case. This distinguished Arcara from the draft card burning case, United States v. O'Brien (1968), and other precedents.

== Background ==
Cloud Books operated an adult bookstore in Kenmore, New York. The bookstore sold sexually explicit books and magazines and showed sexually explicit movies. (Whether these were obscene was not at issue in the case.) An undercover deputy sheriff investigated the store and allegedly witnessed sexual activity and solicitation of prostitution on multiple occasions.

New York public health law defined a place used for "lewdness, assignation, or prostitution" as a nuisance. Once a place was determined to be such a nuisance, the law required closure of the premises for one year, among other forms of relief. District Attorney Richard Arcara brought a civil suit against Cloud Books, seeking enforcement.

The defendant argued that the forced closure of the bookstore would violate their First Amendment right to sell books and other materials, which are protected speech. Separately, the defendant argued that the statute only applied to establishments primarily for prostitution and not to bookstores. The trial court and the Appellate Division ruled against these arguments. The state's highest court, the New York Court of Appeals, also sided with the government on the statutory question, but ruled in favor of the defendant on the First Amendment question. According to the New York Court of Appeals, closing the bookstore would have an effect on speech which was greater than necessary for the statute's purpose. The government petitioned to the Supreme Court, which agreed to hear the case.

== Supreme Court ==
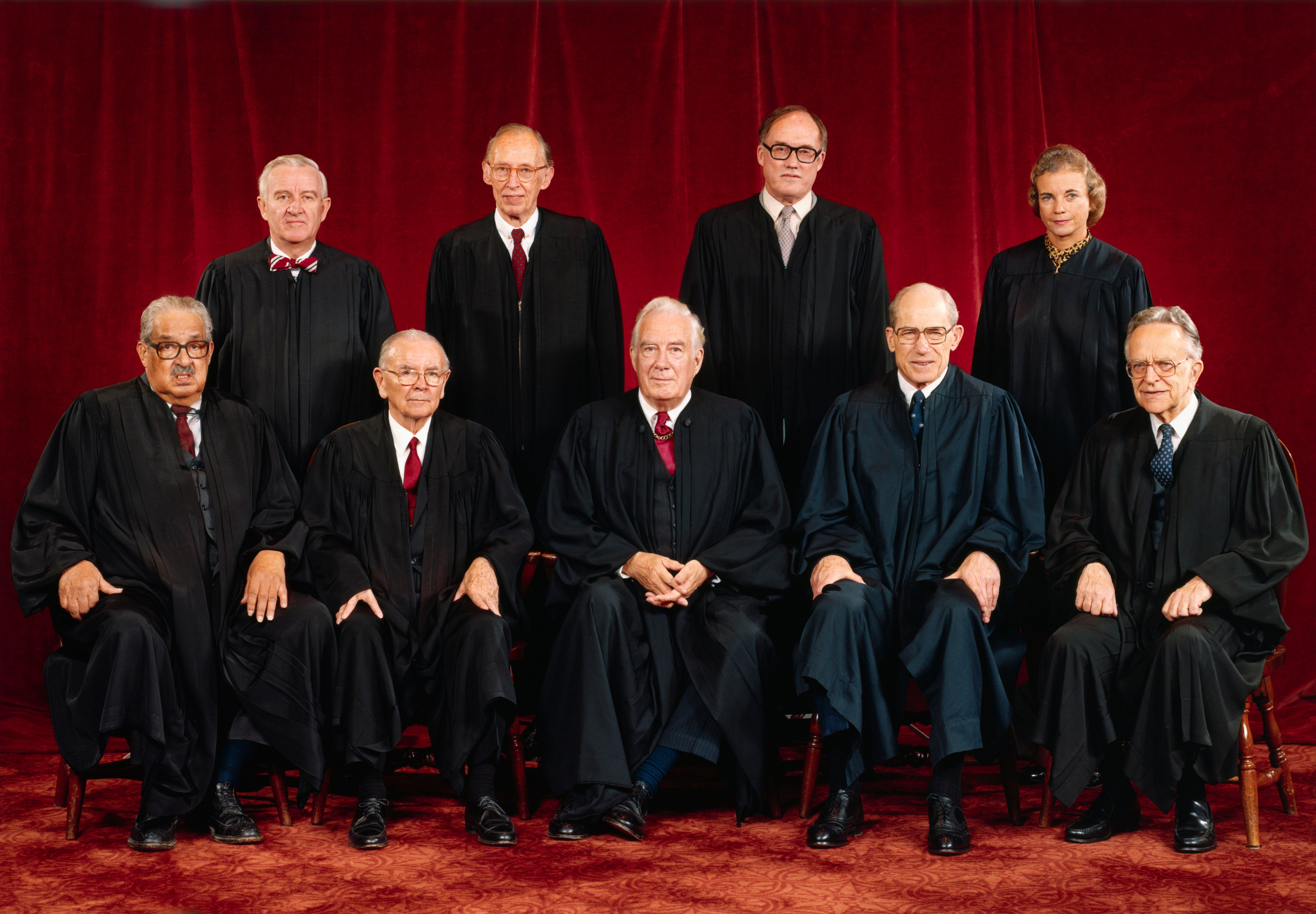
The Burger Court

The Supreme Court decided the case in favor of Arcara, reversing the lower court by a 6–3 vote.

=== Opinion of the Court ===
In an opinion by Chief Justice Warren Burger for a six-justice majority, the court held that no First Amendment scrutiny applied. The prohibited sexual activities were nonexpressive conduct, and the incidental burden on speech did not implicate the First Amendment. The court said that "neither the press nor booksellers may claim special protection from governmental regulations of general applicability simply by virtue of their First Amendment protected activities." Otherwise, the bookseller's argument would be too far-reaching, because "every civil and criminal remedy imposes some conceivable burden on First Amendment protected activities." In addition, the court saw the burden on speech as limited, since the company could still sell books anywhere other than the location to be closed.

The court would only apply heightened scrutiny to restrictions on conduct when "it was conduct with a significant expressive element that drew the legal remedy in the first place" or when the restriction "has the inevitable effect of singling out those engaged in expressive activity". This distinguished two earlier cases: United States v. O'Brien (1968) and Minneapolis Star & Tribune Co. v. Minnesota Commissioner of Revenue (1983), respectively.

In O'Brien, the defendant had burned his draft card as an expression of protest. The First Amendment was implicated, because the conduct was expressive. The court also cited Clark v. Community for Creative Non-Violence (1984) as a precedent similar to O'Brien; Clark was about sleeping in a park to protest the situation of the homeless. In Arcara, on the other hand, the prohibited sexual activity was not expressive, so court held that the O'Brien test was not relevant.

Another earlier case, Minneapolis Star, was about a tax on ink and paper in large quantities. Even though the tax was not on expressive activity, the tax violated the freedom of the press because it was effectively imposed only on newspapers. The court in Arcara found that, unlike Minneapolis Star, the effect of the statute was not to single out First Amendment protected activities.

=== Concurrence ===
Justice Sandra Day O'Connor wrote a one-paragraph concurrence, joined by Stevens. Both justices also joined the majority opinion. She analogized the case to a newscaster arrested for a traffic violation. The traffic law could be enforced, she argued, without First Amendment analysis for the effect on the newscaster's speech. The concurrence added that First Amendment concerns would apply if the nuisance statute were used as a pretext to stop the sale of indecent books, but nothing in the case suggested that the statute was used pretextually.

=== Dissent ===
Justice Harry Blackmun dissented, joined by Brennan and Marshall. Blackmun began with the idea the First Amendment "protects against all laws 'abridging the freedom of speech'—not just those specifically directed at expressive activity." He argued that heightened scrutiny was appropriate: "when a State directly and substantially impairs First Amendment activities, such as by shutting down a bookstore, I believe that the State must show, at a minimum, that it has chosen the least restrictive means of pursuing its legitimate objectives." Because the government had not shown that other means of stopping lewd activity were inadequate, the dissent concluded that closing the store unnecessarily restricted the bookseller's First Amendment rights.

== Analysis ==
The Arcara court was concerned that virtually every law could incidentally restrict speech in certain situations, a concern which First Amendment scholarship has widely acknowledged. The court sought to avoid imposing First Amendment analysis on virtually every law. Constitutional law scholar Wesley Jud Campbell wrote that, since Arcara, "the Court has mostly stopped applying First Amendment scrutiny to general (i.e., nontargeted) regulations of nonexpressive conduct". In a later case, Alexander v. United States (1993), the court relied on Arcara to uphold the forfeiture of all assets of book and film businesses as punishment for obscenity, even though the obscenity may have been expressive.

Arcara is recognized for its analysis of circumstances when incidental effects do receive First Amendment scrutiny. Lower courts and scholars have seen this analysis as incomplete, proposing several additional exceptions. In particular, scholars found it difficult to reconcile the Arcara test with United States v. Albertini (1985). Albertini was an earlier First Amendment case about a man who had been banned from entering a military base and later reentered the base where he participated in a protest. The court applied First Amendment review under O'Brien. Arguably, however, Albertini was punished for the nonexpressive reentry to the base and not for his subsequent protest. Arcara would imply that O'Brien analysis was not applicable. In First Amendment scholar Geoffrey R. Stone's view, Albertini meant either that the two exceptions listed in Arcara were not exhaustive, or that "expressive" activity could be very broad. A law review article by Sri Srinivasan (who later became a D.C. Circuit judge) interpreted Albertini as an exception to Arcara. Campbell argued that the Arcara majority "failed to mention their significant departure from earlier reasoning" and that "Albertini simply does not reflect current doctrine following Arcara."

Scholars looked for explanations beyond the Arcara rule to understand the court's case law about content-neutral and incidental restrictions on speech. In law professor Michael C. Dorf's analysis, "free speech doctrine treats substantial incidental burdens as raising a bona fide constitutional problem and ignores most other incidental burdens", even though the court had never stated such a principle. Stone similarly found that a "significant effect" on speech made the court apply First Amendment scrutiny. Other scholars saw motive as an underlying concern. Then-professor Elena Kagan surmised that "the Court's decision to apply intermediate review to certain incidental restrictions may result not so much from use of the Arcara test as from a visceral sense that an illicit factor entered into a governmental decision". According to Campbell, Arcara represented a doctrinal shift toward an "anti-targeting" principle. Srinivasan argued that "speech-suppressive administrative motive rather than the degree of speech-restrictive effect" was the Supreme Court's main concern in the cases.

== Remand to the New York Court of Appeals ==
After being reversed by the U.S. Supreme Court, the New York Court of Appeals again held that closing the bookstore violated freedom of expression, this time under the New York State Constitution rather than the U.S. Constitution. Federal First Amendment rights were the minimum nationwide standards, but state constitutions could independently have greater protections. Chief Judge Sol Wachtler's unanimous opinion justified greater protection by referencing New York's "long history and tradition of fostering freedom of expression". Based on Court of Appeals precedents, then, an incidental burden on expression could be "no broader than needed to achieve its purpose". When assessing incidental effects, "the test, in traditional terms, is not who is aimed at but who is hit". Rather than closing the bookstore, less restrictive means could include arresting offenders or an injunction.
