= United States v. Albertini =

- Supreme Court of the United States

Argued April 15, 1985 Decided June 24, 1985
- Full case name: United States v. Albertini
- Citations: 472 U.S. 675 (more) 105 S. Ct. 2897

Court membership
- Chief Justice Warren E. Burger Associate Justices William J. Brennan Jr. · Byron White; Thurgood Marshall · Harry Blackmun; Lewis F. Powell Jr. · William Rehnquist; John P. Stevens · Sandra Day O'Connor

Case opinions
- Majority: O'Connor, joined by Burger, White, Blackmun, Powell, Rehnquist
- Dissent: Stevens, joined by Brennan, Marshall

United States v. Albertini, 472 U.S. 675 (1985), was a United States Supreme Court case about the First Amendment rights of a man who had been banned from entering a military base and later entered the base where he participated in a protest. According to the court, the base did not become a public forum just because it was holding an open house at the time. The court held that the government's interest in securing military bases justified excluding people who had been ordered not to reenter. This First Amendment holding applied a version of the test from United States v. O'Brien (1968) for content-neutral incidental burdens on speech.

== Background ==
In 1972, James Albertini entered Hickam Air Force Base in Hawaii and destroyed military documents there. He was convicted for the crime. In addition, the commander of the base issued him a "bar letter" which prohibited him from entering the base again.

Nine years later, in 1981, Albertini reentered Hickam during its annual Armed Forces Day open house. The open house invited the general public to visit the base, which was normally closed to the public. At the open house, Albertini and his companions peacefully protested against the nuclear arms race. Military police removed them from the base.

Albertini was convicted of the crime of reentering a military base after having been ordered not to. The conviction was reversed by the U.S. Court of Appeals for the Ninth Circuit, which held that the open house was a temporary public forum and that excluding him from the forum violated the First Amendment. The government petitioned to the Supreme Court, which agreed to hear the case.

== Supreme Court ==
The Supreme Court decided that Albertini's conviction did not violate the First Amendment.

=== Opinion of the court ===
Justice Sandra Day O'Connor wrote for a six-justice majority. The court first determined that the criminal statute covered Albertini's conduct. Rejecting several of Albertini's arguments, the court found that his exclusion from the base did not have an implicit time limit, that open houses were still subject to the statute, and that the statute did not require a knowing violation of the bar letter.

Turning to the First Amendment arguments, the court reiterated that military bases ordinarily are not public forums, citing Greer v. Spock (1976). The court held that the open house did not temporarily turn the base into a public forum just because the open house was used for communication.

Even if the open house was a public forum, the court found that the statute was content-neutral, subjecting it to the test of United States v. O'Brien (1968) for incidental burdens on speech. Here, the burden was "no greater than is essential" and "the neutral regulation promotes a substantial government interest that would be achieved less effectively absent the regulation". The criminal prosecution was not because of speech, but because of unlawful entry to the base. The court concluded that this validly served the government's interest in the security of military bases.

=== Dissent ===
Justice John Paul Stevens dissented, joined by Brennan and Marshall. Stevens argued that the circumstances reasonably permitted Albertini's entry. The statute was not meant to punish a visit to the base when the open house welcomed him to visit. Stevens disagreed with the majority for interpreting the text too literally to create strict liability beyond what Congress intended.

== Analysis ==
Commentators saw Albertini as weakening the test the court applies for neutral and incidental burdens on speech. According to law professor David S. Day, Albertini used the O'Brien test in a way such that "the not greater than necessary prong was not the equivalent of a least restrictive alternative analysis". He concluded that Albertini, along with Wayte v. United States earlier the same year, effectively "reduced the means scrutiny to the rational basis level". A law review article by Carney R. Shegerian highlighted how a later case Ward v. Rock Against Racism (1989) "gave the narrowly tailored requirement little, if any, force" by relying on language from Albertini along with Clark v. Community for Creative Non-Violence (1984).

Scholars found it difficult to interpret Albertini's place in First Amendment doctrine after Arcara v. Cloud Books, Inc. (1986). Arcara was a later First Amendment case about closing a bookstore because of illicit sexual activities occurring there. The court applied no First Amendment scrutiny to the effect of the forced closure, distinguishing O'Brien and Albertini because the prohibited sexual activities had no expressive element. Scholars questioned this reasoning: Albertini was also punished for nonexpressive conduct – reentry to the base – not for his subsequent protest. In First Amendment scholar Geoffrey R. Stone's view, Albertini meant either that there were exceptions to Arcara not recognized there, or that "expressive" activity could be very broad. A law review article by Sri Srinivasan (who later became a D.C. Circuit judge) interpreted Albertini as an exception to Arcara. Constitutional law scholar Wesley Jud Campbell argued that "the Court's method of decision in Albertini simply does not reflect current doctrine following Arcara."
