= Symbolic speech =

Legal term in United States law

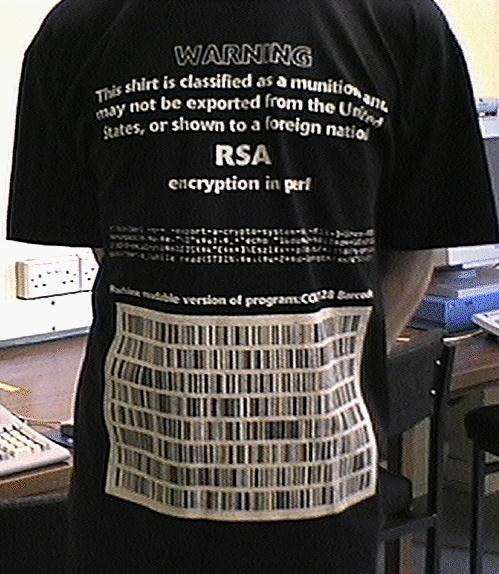
Export-restricted RSA encryption source code printed on a T-shirt. Classified as a munition under U.S. law, it was worn as symbolic speech and as a code as speech protest against U.S. encryption export restrictions.(Back side).

Symbolic speech is a legal term in United States law used to describe actions that purposefully and discernibly convey a particular message or statement to those viewing it. Symbolic speech is recognized as being protected under the First Amendment as a form of speech, but this is not expressly written as such in the document. One possible explanation as to why the Framers did not address this issue in the Bill of Rights is because the primary forms for both political debate and protest in their time were verbal expression and published word, and they may have been unaware of the possibility of future people using non-verbal expression. Symbolic speech is distinguished from pure speech, which is the communication of ideas through spoken or written words or through conduct limited in form to that necessary to convey the idea.

While First Amendment protections originally only applied to laws passed by Congress, these protections on symbolic speech have also applied to state governments since Gitlow v. New York, which established the basis for the incorporation of First Amendment rights into state jurisdictions.

== Tests for protection ==
=== O'Brien test ===
While writing the majority opinion for United States v. O'Brien, Chief Justice Warren described a series of guidelines used to determine whether a law that restricts speech violates the First Amendment. These guidelines must remain neutral in relation to the subject of the speech at hand (e.g., a speech that criticizes government action and is believed to violate a law must be treated the same way as a speech under identical circumstance, but praising the government as opposed to criticizing.) The O'Brien test is not meant to be the absolute deciding factor in cases involving non-verbal speech, but an additional tool to invoke against prohibitions.

The O'Brien test is thus: The law in question must

- be within the Constitutional power of the government to enact.
- further an important or substantial government interest.
  - That interest must be unrelated to the suppression of speech (or "content neutral", as phrased in later cases)
  - Prohibit no more speech than is essential to further that interest.

=== Spence test ===
In the per curiam decision of Spence v. Washington, the Court developed a two-prong test to determine if symbolic speech qualified for First Amendment protections. Under the Spence test, the action must:

- have an intent to convey a particularized message was present, and
- in the surrounding circumstances the likelihood was great that the message would be understood by those who viewed it.

The Spence test was affirmed in Texas v. Johnson, though without focus on the "surrounding circumstances" phrase. However, Hurley v. Irish-American Gay, Lesbian, and Bisexual Group of Boston challenged whether a "particularized message" must be present. There has been a circuit split between whether Spence or Hurley apply.

== Major cases ==
=== Tinker v. Des Moines ===
In December 1965, a group of five students, including lead plaintiff John Tinker and his sister Mary Beth Tinker, wore black armbands overlaid with a white peace sign between December 16 and New Years Day. The principals of the students' schools had previously threatened to suspend any students who participated in the protest. Despite the warning, the small group of students proceeded to carry out their dissent, and were duly suspended. ACLU attorneys representing the students argued that the armbands constituted a form of symbolic speech and, because their demonstration was suppressed, their First Amendment rights were unconstitutionally restrained. The court voted 7–2 in favor of Tinker, finding that the suspension had violated the students' First Amendment rights. Justice Fortas, delivering the opinion of the court, held the following:

- "In wearing armbands, the petitioners were quiet and passive. They were not disruptive, and did not impinge upon the rights of others. In these circumstances, their conduct was within the protection of the Free Speech Clause of the First Amendment and the Due Process Clause of the Fourteenth."
- "First Amendment rights are available to teachers and students, subject to application in light of the special characteristics of the school environment."
- "A prohibition against expression of opinion, without any evidence that the rule is necessary to avoid substantial interference with school discipline or the rights of others, is not permissible under the First and Fourteenth Amendments."

=== United States v. O'Brien ===
"On the morning of March 31, 1966, David Paul O'Brien and three companions burned their Selective Service registration certificates on the steps of the South Boston Courthouse. A sizable crowd, including several agents of the Federal Bureau of Investigation, witnessed the event. Immediately after the burning, members of the crowd began attacking O'Brien and his companions. An FBI agent ushered O'Brien to safety inside the courthouse. After he was advised of his right to counsel and to silence, O'Brien stated to FBI agents that he had burned his registration certificate because of his beliefs, knowing that he was violating federal law. He produced the charred remains of the certificate, which, with his consent, were photographed.

For this act, O'Brien was indicted, tried, convicted, and sentenced in the United States District Court for the District of Massachusetts. He did not contest the fact that he had burned the certificate. He stated in argument to the jury that he burned the certificate publicly to influence others to adopt his anti-war beliefs, as he put it, "so that other people would reevaluate their positions with Selective Service, with the armed forces, and reevaluate their place in the culture of today, to hopefully consider my position."

The court ruled 7–1 against O'Brien. In the opinion of the court, Chief Justice Warren wrote that while the First Amendment does protect freedom of speech, it does not protect all things that may extraneously be labeled "symbolic speech". As such, O'Brien's protest was not protected because the United States had a compelling interest in preventing the destruction or mutilation of draft cards. To help himself and future justices determine what may be protected under the free speech clause, he developed a series of requirements that laws must meet in order to stay out of conflict with the First, and thus be considered constitutional, known now as the O'Brien test.

=== Cohen v. California ===
In 1968, Paul Cohen entered a Los Angeles Courthouse wearing a jacket that displayed the words "Fuck the Draft" knowing that the jacket displayed these words. Though he had removed the jacket and placed it under his arm before entering the courthouse, a police officer witnessed the jacket and slogan in the corridor and arrested him for "willingly and unlawfully and maliciously disturbing the peace and quiet by engaging in tumultuous and offensive conduct."

The Court voted 5–4 in favor of Cohen. Justice Harlan wrote "[A]bsent a more particularized and compelling reason for its actions, the State may not, consistently with the First and Fourteenth Amendments, make the simple public display of this single four-letter expletive a criminal offense." In the court's opinion, Harlan also penned the now famous line "one man's vulgarity is another's lyric".

=== Spence v. Washington ===
A college student had hung a U.S. flag on his window, upside down and adorned with peace signs, in May 1970 as to protest the government's actions in the invasion of Cambodia and the Kent State shootings. He was arrested and convicted under a Washington state statute that barred "improper use" of the flag, including adorning it with decorations. The Supreme Court ruled per curiam that the statute was unconstitutional as it did not consider the intent of speech of displaying the flag. In the opinion, the Court devised a two-prong test to determine if actions can qualify for First Amendment protections: "An intent to convey a particularized message was present, and in the surrounding circumstances the likelihood was great that the message would be understood by those who viewed it.". This doctrine became known as the Spence test.

=== Texas v. Johnson ===
In 1984, during a protest against the policies of the Reagan administration in Dallas, Texas, Gregory Lee Johnson doused an American flag that was given to him by a fellow demonstrator with kerosene and set it alight while those around him chanted "America the red, white and blue, we spit on you." He was later arrested and convicted on a flag desecration law in Texas, and sentenced to one year in prison and a $2,000 fine. The court ruled 5 to 4 in favor of Johnson. Building upon Spence, Justice Brennan wrote that because such other actions in relation to the flag (such as saluting, and displaying) are considered to be a form of expression, so must too the burning be, and that Johnson's protest was "'Sufficiently imbued with elements of communication' to implicate the First Amendment." He also explained that the relevance of the O'Brien test is limited "in which 'the governmental interest is unrelated to the suppression of free expression'", as the Texas law in question had its interest in preventing any violent reaction that may spring from those witnessing the burning of the flag. This case helped solidify the condition that any law that inhibits freedom of speech must have an important and compelling interest to do so.

=== Hurley v. Irish-American Gay, Lesbian, and Bisexual Group of Boston ===
In 1992, an LGBT group was refused to allow to participate in Boston's parade in celebration of St. Patrick's Day and Evacuation Day by the parade organizers, who said the group's identity did not fit the theme of the parade. The Supreme Court unanimously ruled in favor of the organizers, that the message they wanted to convey was expressive speech and protected by the First Amendment, and thus could deny the LGBT group from participation. Justice David Souter wrote in the opinion that the "particularized message" from Spence was too limited, and that a "narrow, succinctly articulable message is not a condition of constitutional protection, which if confined to expressions conveying a 'particularized message', would never reach the unquestionably shielded painting of Jackson Pollock, music of Arnold Schoenberg, or Jabberwocky verse of Lewis Carroll." Hurley's conflict with Spence and Johnson created a circuit split on evaluating symbolic speech for constitutional protection.
