= Merrell Dow Pharmaceuticals Inc. v. Thompson =

- Supreme Court of the United States

Argued April 28, 1986 Decided July 7, 1986
- Full case name: Merrell Dow Pharmaceuticals Inc. v. Thompson, et al., as next friends and guardians of Thompson, et al.
- Citations: 478 U.S. 804 (more) 106 S. Ct. 3229; 92 L. Ed. 2d 650; 1986 U.S. LEXIS 143; 54 U.S.L.W. 5088

Case history
- Prior: Thompson v. Merrell Dow Pharmaceuticals, Inc., 766 F.2d 1005 (6th Cir. 1985); cert. granted, 474 U.S. 1004 (1985).

Holding
- A violation of a federal statute, as part of a claim, is not sufficient for the federal courts to claim original jurisdiction if the statute does not create a private remedy for violations of the statute.

Court membership
- Chief Justice Warren E. Burger Associate Justices William J. Brennan Jr. · Byron White; Thurgood Marshall · Harry Blackmun; Lewis F. Powell Jr. · William Rehnquist; John P. Stevens · Sandra Day O'Connor

Case opinions
- Majority: Stevens, joined by Burger, Powell, Rehnquist, O'Connor
- Dissent: Brennan, joined by White, Marshall, Blackmun

Laws applied
- 28 U.S.C. § 1331

Merrell Dow Pharmaceuticals Inc. v. Thompson, 478 U.S. 804 (1986), was a United States Supreme Court decision involving the original jurisdiction of the federal district courts under 28 U.S.C. § 1331 (federal question jurisdiction).

== Background ==
The Thompsons, residents of Canada, and the MacTavishes, residents of Scotland, filed virtually identical complaints against Merrell Dow Pharmaceuticals in the Court of Common Pleas in Hamilton County, Ohio, claiming negligence, fraud, breach of warranty, and misbranding in violation of the Federal Food, Drug, and Cosmetic Act (FDCA). The mother in each family had taken the drug Bendectin during pregnancy which they claimed caused harm to their children including birth defects.

=== Procedural history ===
The case was filed in state court and then removed to federal district court where it was found that Count IV (the misbranding count) of the complaint alleged a cause of action arising under federal law and the motion to remand was denied. It then granted petitioner's motion to dismiss on forum non conveniens grounds. The United States Court of Appeals for the Sixth Circuit reversed claiming that the FDCA did not create or imply a private right to sue for injury resulting in no federal subject matter jurisdiction.

== Issue ==
The question raised was whether the federal district courts have original federal question jurisdiction under 28 U.S.C. § 1331 when a claim arises out of a federal statute that has not specifically granted a private right to a cause of action. The case considered several different tests to determine when a case is covered under original jurisdiction for the federal courts. These tests include:

Holmes' "Creation" Test:
The "vast majority" of cases that come within this grant of jurisdiction are covered by Justice Holmes' statement that a "`suit arises under the law that creates the cause of action.'"

Franchise Tax Board Test:
The Court has also granted jurisdiction "where the vindication of a right under state law necessarily turned on some construction of federal law."

Smith Test (Quoting from the dissent):
"The general rule is that where it appears from the bill or statement of the plaintiff that the right to relief depends upon the construction or application of the Constitution or laws of the United States, and that such federal claim is not merely colorable, and rests upon a reasonable foundation, the District Court has jurisdiction [478 U.S. 804, 820] under [the statute granting federal question jurisdiction]."

== Majority opinion ==
The Court affirmed the Sixth Circuit and ruled that there was no federal question jurisdiction.

Justice Stevens, writing for the majority, took as his starting point the conclusion that Congress did not intend a private Federal cause of action for violations of the FDCA; in other words, private parties may not bring a suit solely on the basis of a violation of the Act. This was the Sixth Circuit's determination, and it was not disputed by any of the parties to the suit.

The Court states that the significance of the lack of a Federal cause of action "cannot be overstated." The ruling relies heavily on the notion of respect for congressional intent. The Court interprets the fact that Congress did not create a cause of action to be conclusive evidence that Congress did not intend for claimed violations of the FDCA as elements of a state cause of action to be "substantial" enough to confer federal-question jurisdiction.

== Dissent ==
Justice Brennan, writing for the dissent, argued that there is federal jurisdiction whenever a federal question is an ingredient of the action. Furthermore, there may be federal question jurisdiction even though both the right asserted and the remedy sought by a plaintiff are state created. Additionally, federal courts are much more adept at interpreting and applying federal law, and more likely to correctly understand Congress’ intent in enacting legislation than are state courts.

== Aftermath ==
It was not entirely clear from the opinion whether lack of a private cause of action will always be dispositive in every case. The Court clarified the issue in Grable & Sons Metal Products, Inc. v. Darue Engineering & Mfg., saying that the absence of a right of action is relevant evidence of congressional intent, but does not necessarily decide the question in all cases.

== See also ==
- List of United States Supreme Court cases, volume 478
- List of United States Supreme Court cases by the Rehnquist Court
