= Bosh v. Cherokee County Governmental Building Authority =

Bosh v. Cherokee County Governmental Building Authority is a 2013 Supreme Court of Oklahoma case that held for the first time that the Oklahoma state constitution provided a civil remedy for violations of state constitutional rights. The recognition of civil remedies directly under the state constitution was viewed as a watershed moment in the development of civil rights in Oklahoma. Since the decision issued, claims asserting violations of state constitutional rights in Oklahoma are now colloquially referred to as "Bosh claims."

The Bosh decision resulted from an incident at a local jail. Video from the facility showed a handcuffed man, later identified as Daniel Bosh, exchanging words with a jailer. The video shows the jailer leave his chair to confront Mr. Bosh. As the two men continued exchanging words, the jailer grabbed Mr. Bosh by the back of the neck and drove his head into the front of the booking desk. The jailer then placed Mr. Bosh's head underneath his arm and fell backwards causing Mr. Bosh's head to strike the floor causing injuries.

At the time of the incident, Oklahoma law provided absolute immunity for conduct occurring within a jail facility. In Bosh, the Oklahoma Supreme Court recognized that immunity conflicted with the state constitution which prohibited the use of excessive force. For this reason, the Oklahoma Supreme Court held that recognizing immunity in this circumstance would nullify rights granted by the state constitution.

Since the decision issued, both state and federal courts have wrestled with the scope of the opinion and how it might apply in contexts outside excessive force within a jail.

The case was argued to the Court by lawyers from the Bryan & Terrill law firm.
