= Mitchell v. Forsyth =

- Supreme Court of the United States

Argued February 27, 1985 Decided June 19, 1985
- Full case name: Mitchell v. Forsyth
- Citations: 472 U.S. 511 (more) 105 S. Ct. 2479; 86 L. Ed. 2d 29; 1985 U.S. LEXIS 91; 53 U.S.L.W. 4665

Case history
- Prior: Summary judgment motions denied, Forsyth v. Kleindienst, 447 F. Supp. 192 (E.D. Pa. 1978); affirmed in part and remanded, 599 F.2d 1203 (3d Cir. 1979); cert. denied, 453 U.S. 913 (1981); rehearing denied, 453 U.S. 928 (1981); summary judgment on liability granted in favor of plaintiff, 551 F. Supp. 1247 (E.D. Pa. 1982); motion to dismiss appeal denied, 700 F.2d 104 (3d Cir. 1983); affirmed, 729 F.2d 267 (3d Cir. 1984); cert. granted, 469 U.S. 929 (1984).
- Subsequent: On remand, Forsyth v. Kleindienst, 772 F.2d 894 (3d Cir. 1985).

Holding
- Petitioner is not absolutely immune from suit for damages arising out of his allegedly unconstitutional conduct in performing his national security functions.

Court membership
- Chief Justice Warren E. Burger Associate Justices William J. Brennan Jr. · Byron White; Thurgood Marshall · Harry Blackmun; Lewis F. Powell Jr. · William Rehnquist; John P. Stevens · Sandra Day O'Connor

Case opinions
- Majority: White, joined by Blackmun; Burger, O'Connor (Parts I, III, IV); Brennan, Marshall (Parts I, II)
- Concurrence: Burger
- Concurrence: O'Connor, joined by Burger
- Concurrence: Stevens (in the judgment)
- Concur/dissent: Brennan, joined by Marshall
- Powell and Rehnquist took no part in the consideration or decision of the case.

Laws applied
- U.S. Const. amend. IV

Mitchell v. Forsyth, 472 U.S. 511 (1985), was a United States Supreme Court case deciding on the issue of immunity of cabinet officers from suits from individuals.

In 1970, John N. Mitchell, Attorney General, authorized a warrantless wiretap for the purpose of gathering intelligence regarding the activities of a radical group that had made tentative plans to take actions threatening the Nation's security. During the time the wiretap was installed, the Government intercepted three conversations between a member of the group and respondent. In 1972, the Supreme Court in United States v. United States District Court (1972), also known as the Keith case, ruled that the Fourth Amendment does not permit warrantless wiretaps in cases involving domestic threats to the national security. Respondent then filed a damages action in Federal District Court against petitioner and others, alleging that the surveillance to which he had been subjected violated the Fourth Amendment and Title III of the Omnibus Crime Control and Safe Streets Act. Ultimately, the District Court, granting respondent's motion for summary judgment on the issue of liability, held that petitioner was not entitled to either absolute or qualified immunity. The Court of Appeals agreed with the denial of absolute immunity, but held, with respect to the denial of qualified immunity, that the District Court's order was not appealable under the collateral order doctrine.

== Decision ==
The Court held:

1. Petitioner is not absolutely immune from suit for damages arising out of his allegedly unconstitutional conduct in performing his national security functions. His status as a Cabinet officer is not in itself sufficient to invest him with absolute immunity. The considerations of separation of powers that call for absolute immunity for state and federal legislators and for the President do not demand a similar immunity for Cabinet officers or other high executive officials. Nor does the nature of the Attorney General's national security functions—as opposed to his prosecutorial functions—warrant absolute immunity. Petitioner points to no historical or common law basis for absolute immunity for officers carrying out tasks essential to national security, such as pertains to absolute immunity for judges, prosecutors, and witnesses. The performance of national security functions does not subject an official to the same risks of entanglement in vexatious litigation as does the carrying out of the judicial or "quasijudicial" tasks that have been the primary wellsprings of absolute immunities. And the danger that high federal officials will disregard constitutional rights in their zeal to protect the national security is sufficiently real to counsel against affording such officials an absolute immunity. P P. 520-524.

2. The District Court's denial of qualified immunity, to the extent it turned on a question of law, is an appealable "final decision" within the meaning of 28 U.S.C. § 1291 notwithstanding the absence of a final judgment. Qualified immunity, similar to absolute immunity, is an entitlement not to stand trial under certain circumstances. Such entitlement is an immunity from suit rather than a mere defense to liability; and like absolute immunity, it is effectively lot if a case is erroneously permitted to go to trial. Accordingly, the reasoning that underlies the immediate appealability of the denial of absolute immunity indicates that the denial of qualified immunity should be similarly appealable under the "collateral order" doctrine; in each case, the district court's decision is effectively unreviewable on appeal from a final judgment. The denial of qualified immunity also meets the additional criteria for an appealable interlocutory order: it conclusively determines the disputed question, and it involves a claim of rights separable from, and collateral to, rights asserted in the action. P P. 524-530.

3. Petitioner is entitled to qualified immunity from suit for his authorization of the wiretap in question notwithstanding his actions violated the Fourth Amendment. Under Harlow v. Fitzgerald, 457 U. S. 800, petitioner is immune unless his actions violated clearly established law. In 1970, when the wiretap took place, well over a year before Keith, supra, was decided, it was not clearly established that such a wiretap was unconstitutional. P P. 530-535.

== See also ==
- List of United States Supreme Court cases, volume 472
- Qualified immunity
- Immunity from prosecution
