= Imbler =

Imbler may refer to:

- Imbler, Oregon, U.S., a city
- Imbler v. Pachtman, 1976 U.S. Supreme Court case
- Sabrina Imbler (born 1994), American science journalist and essayist
