= De Canas v. Bica =

US Supreme Court Case

- Supreme Court of the United States

Argued December 16, 1975 Decided February 25, 1976
- Full case name: Leonor Alberti DeCANAS and Miguel Canas, Petitioners, v. Anthony G. BICA and Juan Silva.
- Citations: 424 U.S. 351 (more)

Case history
- Prior: Law declared unconstitutional by California Superior Court. Upheld by California Court of Appeal, Second Appellate District.
- Subsequent: Reversed and remanded

Holding
- States have the power, within federal law, to restrict the employment of illegal aliens.

Court membership
- Chief Justice Warren E. Burger Associate Justices William J. Brennan Jr. · Potter Stewart; Byron White · Thurgood Marshall; Harry Blackmun · Lewis F. Powell Jr. William Rehnquist · John P. Stevens

Case opinion
- Majority: Brennan, joined by unanimous
- Stevens took no part in the consideration or decision of the case.

Laws applied
- Supremacy Clause, Immigration and Nationality Act
- Abrogated by
- Section 274A of the Immigration and Nationality Act, as added by the Immigration Reform and Control Act of 1986

De Canas v. Bica, 424 U.S. 351 (1976), is an abrogated case decided by the US Supreme Court on February 25, 1976, that upheld Section 2805(a) of the California Labor Code against a Federal preemption challenge.

== Provisions of the law ==
Section 2805(a) of the California Labor Code prohibits employers from knowingly employing aliens that do not have lawful residence in the United States if their employment would have a negative effect on lawful resident workers.

== Background ==
The petitioners of this case were migrant farmworkers, who had been employed by farm labor contractors, the respondents, between June and September 1972. On September 28, 1972, the farm labor contractors refused to extend their employment due to the surplus of labor that they had. The petitioners filed a complaint against the respondents, alleging that they were lawful residents and that their employers knowingly employed illegal aliens, violating Section 2805(a) of the California Labor Code. This complaint not only sought for the reinstatement of their employment, but to file an injunction against the respondent's continued employment of illegal aliens. In response, the respondents filed a demurrer, challenging the constitutionality of this section of the labor code itself.

Ignoring the petitioner's complaint, the California Superior Court ruled that Section 2805(a) of the California Labor Code was unconstitutional since it interfered with immigration policy – an area over which Congress has exclusive power.

The California Court of Appeals, Second Appellate District, affirmed this lower court ruling, emphasizing that congressional power was exclusive within the bounds of immigration and naturalization.

This ruling was again challenged, leading to the US Supreme Court granting a writ of certiorari.

== Ruling ==
In a decision published on February 25, 1976, the US Supreme Court unanimously reversed the lower court's ruling, finding that Section 2805(a) of the California Labor Court was constitutional, and that it is not preempted under the Supremacy Clause of the Immigration and Nationality Act (INA). The majority opinion, written by Justice William J. Brennan Jr., articulated three main reasons for the Supreme Court's decision:

1. Although illegal aliens may be the subjects of this California statute, it is not immediately a regulation of immigration. Thus, even if a local statute were to have somewhat of an impact of immigration, it doesn't necessarily become a constitutionally prescribed regulation of immigration.
2. Preemption on the basis of congressional intent is not necessarily applicable, as the creation of federal acts such as the INA was not intended to derail a state's authority to regulate their employment and protect their workers. For example, the Farm Labor Contractor Registration Act, which prohibited farm workers from employing illegal aliens, was enacted in order to supplement state protections, and thus, the INA can function in the same manner.
3. Interpreting this code should be up to the California courts, and they should subsequently decide to what extent this code is unconstitutional with the INA or any other federal act.

== Impacts of the law ==
The ruling in this case provided insight into the role that state governments could play in immigration policy. In much of American history, immigration policy and regulations were exclusively delegated to the federal government – specifically the Congress. The federal government utilized their extensive plenary power to dictate all major immigration policies, limiting the influence of the state governments in this regard. Despite the fact that De Canas v. Bica challenged a California statute, the Supreme Court upheld the statute as constitutional, since it did not counter or infringe upon the Immigration and Nationality Act, or any other federal immigration act at that time. Thus, this case indicated that states were able to introduce policies that concerned immigration, as long as they didn't go against the goals of the federal government.
