= Mathews v. Eldridge =

- Supreme Court of the United States

Argued October 6, 1975 Decided February 24, 1976
- Full case name: F. David Mathews, Secretary of Health, Education, and Welfare, v. George H. Eldridge
- Citations: 424 U.S. 319 (more) 96 S. Ct. 893; 47 L. Ed. 2d 18

Case history
- Prior: Eldridge v. Weinberger, 361 F. Supp. 520 (W.D. Va. 1973), affirmed, 493 F.2d 1230 (4th Cir. 1974), cert. granted, 419 U.S. 1104 (1975).

Holding
- Due process does not require a Goldberg-type hearing prior to the termination of social security disability benefits on the ground that the worker is no longer disabled

Court membership
- Chief Justice Warren E. Burger Associate Justices William J. Brennan Jr. · Potter Stewart; Byron White · Thurgood Marshall; Harry Blackmun · Lewis F. Powell Jr. William Rehnquist · John P. Stevens

Case opinions
- Majority: Powell, joined by Burger, Stewart, White, Blackmun, Rehnquist
- Dissent: Brennan, joined by Marshall
- Stevens took no part in the consideration or decision of the case.

Laws applied
- U.S. Const. amend. V

Mathews v. Eldridge, 424 U.S. 319 (1976), is a landmark decision of the Supreme Court of the United States that held that individuals have a statutorily granted property right in Social Security benefits, and the termination of such benefits implicates due process but does not require a pre-termination hearing. The case is significant in the development of American administrative law.

== Legal principles ==
Determining the constitutional sufficiency of administrative procedures, prior to the initial termination of benefits and pending review, requires consideration of three factors:

1. The interests of the individual in retaining their property and the injury threatened by the official action;
2. The risk of error through the procedures used and probable value, if any, of additional or substitute procedural safeguards;
3. The costs and administrative burden of the additional process, and the interests of the government in efficient adjudication.

The Court determined that Social Security benefits are a statutorily-created property right and so implicate due process.

However, after balancing the three factors, the Court ruled that the administrative procedures in place were constitutional and held that termination of Social Security benefits does not require a pre-termination hearing. See Mathews v. Eldridge, 424 U.S. 319, 347–349 (1976).

== Background ==
The Social Security Administration terminated Eldridge's benefits by its normal procedures. However, Eldridge was not provided with a hearing before the termination of his benefits in which he could argue for a continuation of the benefits. He sued even though he had not exhausted his post-termination administrative remedies. The district court held that the termination was unconstitutional, and the court of appeals affirmed.

The Supreme Court had previously found, in Goldberg v. Kelly (1970), that due process required New York to provide an evidentiary hearing before revoking specific welfare benefits.

== Decision ==
The Supreme Court reversed and held that pre-termination hearing was not required.

== See also ==
- List of United States Supreme Court cases, volume 424
