= List of United States Supreme Court cases, volume 478 =

This is a list of all United States Supreme Court cases from volume 478 of the United States Reports:

Case name	Citation	Date decided
Press-Enterprise Co. v. Super. Ct.	478 U.S. 1	1986
Thornburg v. Gingles	478 U.S. 30	1986
Davis v. Bandemer	478 U.S. 109	1986
Bowers v. Hardwick	478 U.S. 186	1986
Japan Whaling Ass'n. v. American Cetacean Soc.	478 U.S. 221	1986
Acosta v. Louisiana Dept. of Health & Human Resources	478 U.S. 251	1986
Allen v. Hardy	478 U.S. 255	1986
Papasan v. Allain	478 U.S. 265	1986
Library of Congress v. Shaw	478 U.S. 310	1986
Posadas de Puerto Rico Associates v. Tourism Co. of P. R.	478 U.S. 328	1986
Allen v. Illinois	478 U.S. 364	1986
Statements made in civil commitment proceedings for sex offenders are not subject to the Fifth Amendment privilege against self-incrimination.
Bazemore v. Friday	478 U.S. 385	1986
Sheet Metal Workers v. EEOC	478 U.S. 421	1986
Firefighters v. City of Cleveland	478 U.S. 501	1986
Pennsylvania v. Delaware Valley Citizens' Council	478 U.S. 546	1986
Rose v. Clark	478 U.S. 570	1986
United States v. James	478 U.S. 597	1986
Baker v. Gen. Motors Corp.	478 U.S. 621	1986
Randall v. Loftsgaarden	478 U.S. 647	1986
Bethel Sch. Dist. v. Fraser	478 U.S. 675	1986
Arcara v. Cloud Books, Inc.	478 U.S. 697	1986
Bowsher v. Synar	478 U.S. 714	1986
Univ. of Tenn. v. Elliott	478 U.S. 788	1986
Merrell Dow Pharmaceuticals Inc. v. Thompson	478 U.S. 804	1986
Commodity Futures Trading Comm'n v. Schor	478 U.S. 833	1986
Araneta v. United States	478 U.S. 1301	1986
Mikutaitis v. United States	478 U.S. 1306	1986
Prudential Fed. Sav. & Loan Ass'n v. Flanigan	478 U.S. 1311	1986
