= List of United States Supreme Court cases, volume 472 =

This is a list of all United States Supreme Court cases from volume 472 of the United States Reports:

| Case name | Citation | Date decided |
|---|---|---|
| Schreiber v. Burlington Northern, Inc. | 472 U.S. 1 | 1985 |
| Williams v. Vermont | 472 U.S. 14 | 1985 |
| Wallace v. Jaffree | 472 U.S. 38 | 1985 |
| Atkins v. Parker | 472 U.S. 115 | 1985 |
| Northeast Bancorp, Inc. v. Board of Governors, FRS | 472 U.S. 159 | 1985 |
| Lowe v. S.E.C. | 472 U.S. 181 | 1985 |
| Mountain States Tel. & Tel. Co. v. Pueblo of Santa Ana | 472 U.S. 237 | 1985 |
| Northwest Wholesale Stationers, Inc. v. Pacific Stationery & Printing Co. | 472 U.S. 284 | 1985 |
| Bateman Eichler, Hill Richards, Inc. v. Berner | 472 U.S. 299 | 1985 |
| Caldwell v. Mississippi | 472 U.S. 320 | 1985 |
| Johnson v. City of Baltimore | 472 U.S. 353 | 1985 |
| Baldwin v. Alabama | 472 U.S. 372 | 1985 |
| Western Air Lines, Inc. v. Criswell | 472 U.S. 400 | 1985 |
| Richardson-Merrell Inc. v. Koller | 472 U.S. 424 | 1985 |
| Superintendent v. Hill | 472 U.S. 445 | 1985 |
| Maryland v. Macon | 472 U.S. 463 | 1985 |
| Jensen v. Quaring | 472 U.S. 478 | 1985 |
| McDonald v. Smith | 472 U.S. 479 | 1985 |
| Brockett v. Spokane Arcades, Inc. | 472 U.S. 491 | 1985 |
| Mitchell v. Forsyth | 472 U.S. 511 | 1985 |
| Pension Fund v. Central Transport, Inc. | 472 U.S. 559 | 1985 |
| Aspen Skiing Co. v. Aspen Highlands Skiing Corp. | 472 U.S. 585 | 1985 |
| Hooper v. Bernalillo County Assessor | 472 U.S. 612 | 1985 |
| In re Snyder | 472 U.S. 634 | 1985 |
| Cornelius v. Nutt | 472 U.S. 648 | 1985 |
| United States v. Albertini | 472 U.S. 675 | 1985 |
| Estate of Thornton v. Caldor, Inc. | 472 U.S. 703 | 1985 |
| United States v. National Bank of Commerce | 472 U.S. 713 | 1985 |
| Dun & Bradstreet, Inc. v. Greenmoss Builders, Inc. | 472 U.S. 749 | 1985 |
| Phillips Petroleum Co. v. Shutts | 472 U.S. 797 | 1985 |
| Jean v. Nelson | 472 U.S. 846 | 1985 |
