= Maryland v. Macon =

- Supreme Court of the United States

Argued April 17, 1985 Decided June 17, 1985
- Full case name: Maryland v. Macon
- Citations: 472 U.S. 463 (more)

Court membership
- Chief Justice Warren E. Burger Associate Justices William J. Brennan Jr. · Byron White; Thurgood Marshall · Harry Blackmun; Lewis F. Powell Jr. · William Rehnquist; John P. Stevens · Sandra Day O'Connor

Case opinions
- Majority: O'Connor, joined by Burger, White, Blackmun, Powell, Rehnquist, Stevens
- Dissent: Brennan, joined by Marshall

Maryland v. Macon, 472 U.S. 463 (1985), was a case that involved the Fourth Amendment's protection against unreasonable searches and seizures, also regarding First Amendment issues. Baxter Macon, a sales clerk, was charged with the sale of obscene materials after being arrested by a detective not in uniform, who stated that the magazines he purchased in Baxter's store were obscene. The court ruled that the purchase of the magazines was not a seizure, and Macon was found guilty of the sale of obscene materials.

The case involves the court analyzing the Fourth Amendment and determining whether the action taken by the detective was a seizure or not, which would determine if the magazines could be used in the trial as evidence.

== Background ==
The events underlying the case occurred in Prince George's County, Maryland. A detective who was not in uniform entered an adult bookstore while fellow officers waited outside. After looking around for several minutes, the detective decided to purchase two magazines from a sales clerk, Baxter Macon, with a marked $50 bill. The detective went outside, showed the magazines to his fellow officers, and they decided that the magazines were obscene. The detectives went back into the store, arrested Macon, and took the marked $50 bill back. They did not return the change they received as well. Macon was charged with the sale of obscene materials.

== Argument ==
The Fourth Amendment protects people against unlawful searches and seizures. The courts had to deem whether the warrantless arrest was lawful or if it violated Macon's Fourth Amendment rights. The case also involved whether the purchase of the magazines was a "constructive seizure," which would bring up First Amendment issues. The main argument was whether the magazines could be used at trial, based on whether they were seized appropriately under the Fourth Amendment. As for whether they were seized appropriately under the Fourth Amendment, the court had to decide on two main concepts: Was there a reasonable expectation of privacy, and was there an interference in possessory interests. These two concepts help determine whether the magazines could be used in the trial or not.

== Lower courts ==
=== Trial Court ===
Prior to the trial beginning, Macon filed a motion to suppress the magazine and $50 bill as evidence. He claimed that the items could only be obtained with a warrant. The judge denied the defendant's motion, claiming that the purchase of the magazines did not constitute a seizure under the Fourth Amendment, meaning that a warrant was not needed. Thus, making the arrest without a warrant lawful. In this decision, the magazines, but not the $50 bill, were used as evidence. Macon was found guilty of the distribution of obscene material at the bookstore. Macon then files an appeal.

=== Maryland Court of Special Appeals ===
This court reversed the previous verdict of the trial court. The court stated that a warrant was required to obtain the magazines and to arrest the defendant in order to protect the First Amendment freedom of expression. The court determined that the purchase of the magazines was a "constructive seizure," thus requiring a warrant. The magazines were removed as evidence during the trial because they were seized in an unlawful manner. Without the magazines used in trial, the past verdict could not be upheld. The past verdict was reversed and the Maryland Court of Special Appeals found Macon not guilty.

== Supreme Court decision ==
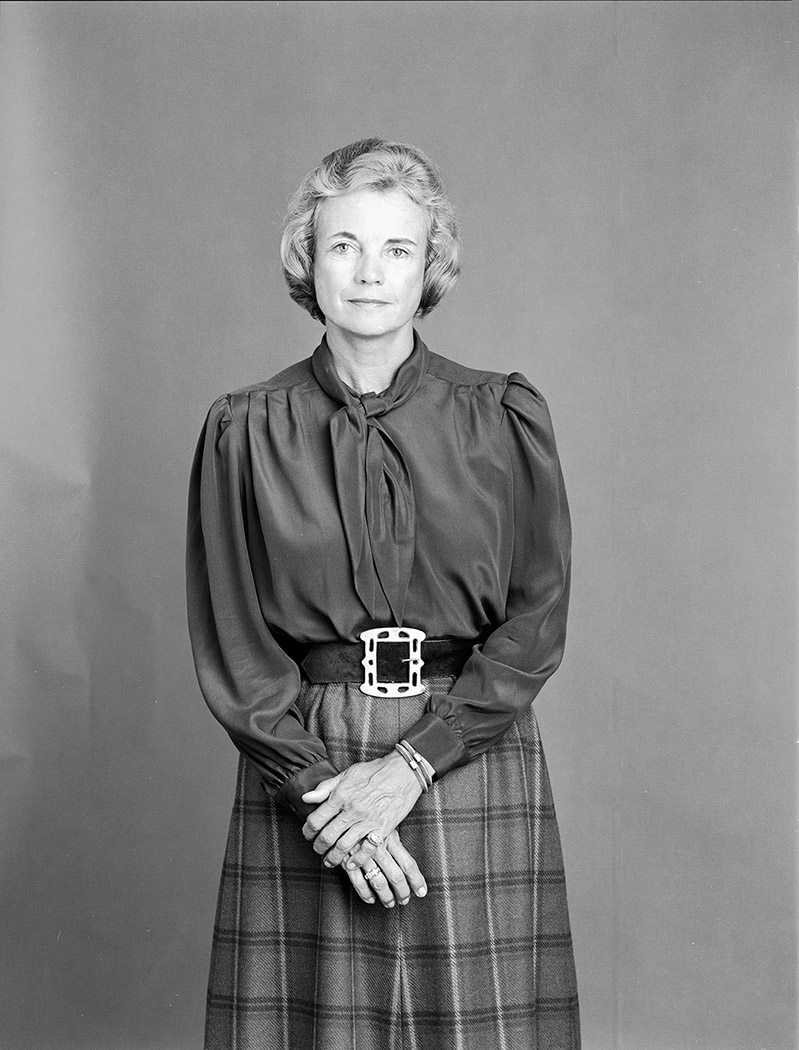
Justice O'Connor delivered the majority opinion.

=== Opinion of the Court ===
The decision of the Supreme Court went against the decision of the Appellate Court. Justice Sandra Day O'Connor presented the majority opinion of the court. The magazines were in a store, which all of the public has access to. Under the Fourth Amendment, "a search occurs when 'an expectation of privacy that society is prepared to consider reasonable is infringed.'" There was no reasonable belief of privacy in this situation, so no warrant was needed. Also, "a seizure occurs when 'there is some meaningful interference with an individual's possessory interests' in the property seized." The purchase of the magazines did not constitute a seizure, as the detective used the money to buy the magazines, which were willingly given over. There was no interference in possessory interests, therefore there was no seizure. Therefore, the Fourth Amendment does not come into effect because there was no reasonable belief of privacy, and there was no meaningful interference with one's possessory interests. The purchase of the magazines by an undercover police officer was not considered a seizure, and the past decision of the Maryland Court of Special Appeals was reversed. Baxter Macon was convicted and found guilty of the distribution of obscene materials.

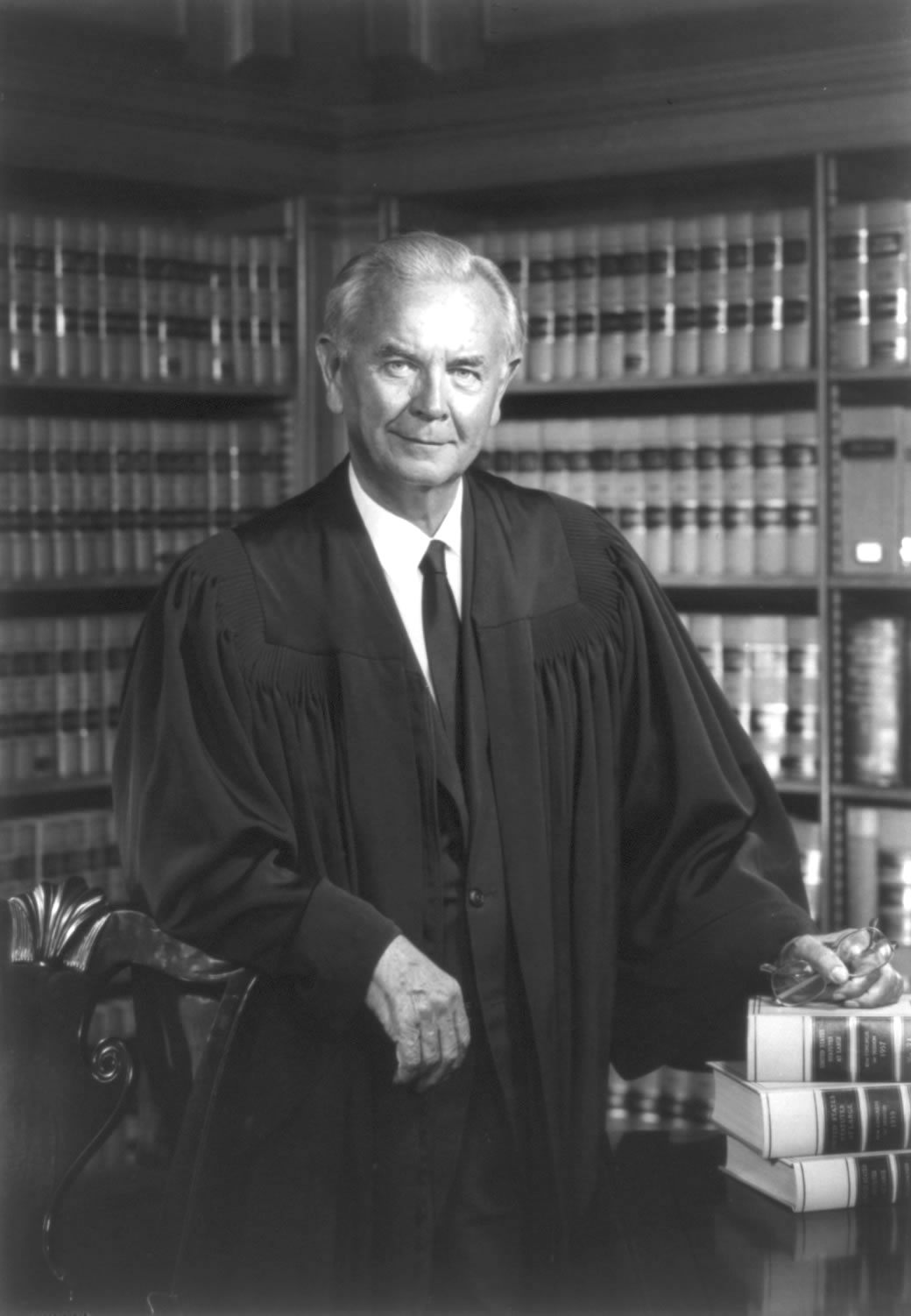
Justice Brennen delivered a dissenting opinion.

=== Dissenting opinions ===
Justice William J. Brennen Jr., joined by Justice Marshall, dissented. They stated that the Maryland obscenity statute was unconstitutional. They feel that improper use of the Fourth Amendment potentially restricts peoples' First Amendment rights. They believe that the materials should have been brought to a judge first in order to determine obscenity. Only a judge could make the decision whether the magazines were obscene or not. Brennen and Marshall believed the Fourth Amendment was abused, which then hindered First Amendment rights of freedom of expression.

== Significance ==
The decision of the U.S. Supreme Court in the case of Maryland v. Maxon was important in determining the authority and domain of undercover law enforcement and helped clarify what establishes the need for a warrant. First, if the decision of the Maryland Court of Special Appeals held, then it would be very difficult for law enforcement to uphold the law or conduct investigation while undercover. They would not be able to engage in business or conduct that is often normal behavior or activities to the general public. The biggest significance of this case is determining whether a warrant was needed or not, depending on what qualifies as a reasonable expectation of privacy and what qualifies as an interference in possessory interests. If the verdict was in favor of the defendant, then law enforcement would need to use a warrant for many more situations than what one is presently used for, making it exceedingly cumbersome and nearly impossible to adequately perform or complete an investigation. The Supreme Court's decision indicated there is no reasonable expectation of privacy in a public business, therefore if a private citizen can see/purchase an item or a service then law enforcement can do so as well without the hinderance of obtaining a warrant.
