= Bazemore v. Friday =

- Supreme Court of the United States

Argued April 22, 1986 Decided July 1, 1986
- Full case name: P. E. Bazemore, et al., petitioners v. William C. Friday, President of the Consolidated University of North Carolina, et al., respondents; United States, et al., petitioners v. William C. Friday, President of the Consolidated University of North Carolina, et al., respondents.
- Docket no.: 85-93, 85-428
- Citations: 478 U.S. 385 (more) 106 S. Ct. 3000; 92 L. Ed. 2d 315; 41 Fair Empl. Prac. Cas. (BNA) 92; 40 Empl. Prac. Dec. P 36, 199; 54 U.S.L.W. 4972; 4 Fed. R. Serv. 3d 1259; 32 Ed. Law Rep. 1223.

Court membership
- Chief Justice Warren E. Burger Associate Justices William J. Brennan Jr. · Byron White; Thurgood Marshall · Harry Blackmun; Lewis F. Powell Jr. · William Rehnquist; John P. Stevens · Sandra Day O'Connor

Case opinions
- Per curiam
- Concurrence: Brennan (in part), joined by unanimous
- Concurrence: White, joined by Burger, Powell, Rehnquist, O'Connor
- Dissent: Brennan (in part), joined by Marshall, Blackmun, Stevens

Bazemore v. Friday, 478 U.S. 385 (1986), is a United States Supreme Court case in which the Court held that a regression analysis does not have to account for every possible factor that could influence salary in order to be considered as evidence of discrimination.

== Background ==
The case of Bazemore v. Friday originated from a lawsuit filed by black employees of the North Carolina Agricultural Extension Service, a public agency providing agricultural education and services. The plaintiffs alleged that the agency was practicing racial discrimination in its salary decisions, violating Title VII of the Civil Rights Act of 1964. The agency had previously operated separate programs for black and white employees, and although it had integrated the programs, it continued to pay the black employees less than their white counterparts.

== Lower Courts' Decisions ==
The District Court and the Fourth Circuit Court of Appeals initially ruled in favor of the defendant, stating that the plaintiffs had failed to prove that the salary disparities were due to racial discrimination. The courts argued that the plaintiffs' regression analysis, which was used to demonstrate the wage gap, was insufficient because it did not account for all possible factors influencing salary.

== Supreme Court Ruling ==
The case was then appealed to the Supreme Court. In a unanimous decision, the Court reversed the lower courts' rulings. The Court held that a regression analysis does not need to include every conceivable variable to be admissible as evidence of discrimination. The Court stated that the plaintiffs had met their burden of proof by showing a significant disparity in pay between black and white employees, and that the defendant had failed to provide a non-discriminatory explanation for this disparity.

Justice Brennan delivered the opinion of the Court.

== Impact and legacy ==
The decision in Bazemore v. Friday has had a significant impact on employment discrimination lawsuits. It has clarified the standards for statistical evidence in such cases, making it easier for plaintiffs to prove discrimination. The case has been cited in numerous subsequent court decisions and has influenced the development of employment law in the United States.
