= Brockett v. Spokane Arcades, Inc. =

- Supreme Court of the United States

Argued February 20, 1985 Decided June 19, 1985
- Full case name: Brockett v. Spokane Arcades, Inc.
- Citations: 472 U.S. 491 (more) 105 S. Ct. 2794; 86 L. Ed. 394

Holding
- An obscenity statute with a severability clause is not to be struck down in whole unless severing the portions of the statute which violate the First Amendment would render it unworkable.

Court membership
- Chief Justice Warren E. Burger Associate Justices William J. Brennan Jr. · Byron White; Thurgood Marshall · Harry Blackmun; Lewis F. Powell Jr. · William Rehnquist; John P. Stevens · Sandra Day O'Connor

Case opinions
- Majority: White, joined by Burger, Blackmun, Rehnquist, Stevens, O'Connor
- Concurrence: O'Connor, joined by Burger, Rehnquist
- Dissent: Brennan, joined by Marshall
- Powell took no part in the consideration or decision of the case.

Laws applied
- U.S. Const. amend. I, Washington Revised Code §§ 7.48A.010-7.48A.900

Brockett v. Spokane Arcades, Inc., 472 U.S. 491 (1985), was a case in which the Supreme Court of the United States held that though portions of a law against obscenity and prostitution might be invalid, it would not be invalidated as a whole unless severing unconstitutional provisions would result in an unworkable law.

== Background ==
The case involved a state statute that punished the publication of obscene materials. Obscene or lewd materials were defined by the law to include all materials that appeal to the prurient interest, among other things. "Prurient" was defined as material that incites lasciviousness or lust. The law was challenged as overbroad under the First Amendment because material that arouses only a "normal, healthy interest in sex" is constitutionally protected, but was banned by the law.

== Opinion of the Court ==
The Court agreed with lower court rulings that the law was overbroad, however found that the entire statute could not be stricken. The code contained a severability provision indicating that the law should not be completely invalidated unless the one unconstitutional provision could not be stricken without making the law unworkable. The Court remanded the case to allow the lower court to decide if the objectionable provision could be stricken and the remainder of the law upheld.

The Court ruled, as it has repeatedly, that it would not rule on the constitutionality of a law, unless it was unavoidable.

== Criticism ==
In the Washington Law Review, Amy L. Swingen criticized the decision, "the United States Supreme Court needlessly risked a constitutional adjudication based on an erroneous interpretation of state law."

== See also ==
- List of United States Supreme Court cases, volume 472
