= Dun & Bradstreet, Inc. v. Greenmoss Builders, Inc. =

- Supreme Court of the United States

Argued March 21, 1984 Reargued October 3, 1984 Decided June 26, 1985
- Full case name: Dun and Bradtreet, Inc. v. Greenmoss Builders, Inc.
- Citations: 472 U.S. 749 (more) 105 S.Ct. 2939; 86 L. Ed. 2d 593; 53 U.S.L.W. 4866; 11 Media L. Rep. 2417

Case history
- Prior: 461 A.2d 414 (Vt. 1983), cert. granted, 464 U.S. 959 (1983).

Holding
- A credit reporting agency can be held civilly liable for ordinary and punitive damages for publishing false assertions about the bankruptcy of a business which is not a public figure.

Court membership
- Chief Justice Warren E. Burger Associate Justices William J. Brennan Jr. · Byron White; Thurgood Marshall · Harry Blackmun; Lewis F. Powell Jr. · William Rehnquist; John P. Stevens · Sandra Day O'Connor

Case opinions
- Plurality: Powell, joined by Rehnquist, O'Connor
- Concurrence: Burger
- Concurrence: White
- Dissent: Brennan, joined by Marshall, Blackmun, Stevens

Laws applied
- U.S. Const., amend. I

Dun & Bradstreet, Inc. v. Greenmoss Builders, Inc., 472 U.S. 749 (1985), was a Supreme Court case which held that a credit reporting agency could be liable in defamation if it carelessly relayed (i.e. published) false information that a business had declared bankruptcy when in fact it had not.

== Facts ==
Dun & Bradstreet, a credit rating agency, sent a report to five subscribers indicating that Greenmoss Builders, a construction contractor, had filed a voluntary petition for bankruptcy. The report was false and grossly misrepresented the contractor's financial health. Thereafter, Dun & Bradstreet issued a corrective notice, but the contractor had already been harmed.

== Procedural history ==
The contractor brought a defamation action in Vermont state court, alleging that the false report had injured its reputation and seeking damages. After trial, the judge submitted the case to the jury without specific instructions as to the level of fault (negligence, actual malice, or strict liability) the jury was required to find before awarding damages against Dun & Bradstreet for defamation. The jury returned a verdict against Dun & Bradstreet in the contractor's favor and awarded both compensatory and punitive damages. Dun & Bradstreet, however, moved for a new trial, and the trial court granted the motion. The Vermont Supreme Court reversed the grant of the motion, holding that the First Amendment allowed an award of damages against a nonmedia defendant such as Dun & Bradstreet, even without a showing of special fault.

== Result ==
The United States Supreme Court affirmed the Vermont Supreme Court's judgment. The court balanced the state's interest in protecting and compensating private individuals for injury to their reputation against the First Amendment right to free speech. The court found that First Amendment interests were less controlling in matters of a purely private concern than matters which are a public interest. The Supreme Court did not overturn Vermont state law allowing awards of presumed and punitive damages absent a showing of "actual malice".

== See also ==
- List of United States Supreme Court cases, volume 472
