= Paul v. Davis =

- Supreme Court of the United States

Argued November 4, 1975 Decided March 23, 1976
- Full case name: Paul, Chief of Police, Louisville, et al. v. Davis
- Citations: 424 U.S. 693 (more) 96 S. Ct. 1155; 47 L. Ed. 2d 405; 1976 U.S. LEXIS 112; 1 I.E.R. Cas. (BNA) 1827

Case history
- Prior: Davis v. Paul, 505 F.2d 1180 (6th Cir. 1974); cert. granted, 421 U.S. 909 (1975).
- Subsequent: Rehearing denied, 425 U.S. 985 (1976); affirmed on remand, Davis v. Paul, 538 F.2d 328 (6th Cir. 1976).

Holding
- Reputation alone is not a constitutionally protected interest.

Court membership
- Chief Justice Warren E. Burger Associate Justices William J. Brennan Jr. · Potter Stewart; Byron White · Thurgood Marshall; Harry Blackmun · Lewis F. Powell Jr. William Rehnquist · John P. Stevens

Case opinions
- Majority: Rehnquist, joined by Burger, Stewart, Blackmun, Powell
- Dissent: Brennan, joined by Marshall, White (in part)
- Stevens took no part in the consideration or decision of the case.

Laws applied
- U.S. Const. amend. XIV; 42 U.S.C. § 1983

Paul v. Davis, 424 U.S. 693 (1976), is a United States Supreme Court case in which a sharply divided Court held that the plaintiff, whom the local police chief had named an "active shoplifter," suffered no deprivation of liberty resulting from injury to his reputation. In the case, the court broke from precedents and restricted the definition of the constitutional right to privacy "to matters relating to 'marriage procreation, contraception, family relationships, and child rearing and education".

== Background ==
The plaintiff, Edward C. Davis III, had been previously arrested on shoplifting charges. After the charges were dropped, Davis sued the chief of police of Louisville, Kentucky, for distributing "active shoplifter" posters to merchants throughout the city.

== Majority holding ==
In a 5–3 decision in favor of the police chief, Paul, Justice Rehnquist wrote the opinion for the majority. The majority opinion held that petitioner's alleged defamation, a typical state court claim, was not actionable under the Due Process Clause and 42 U.S.C. § 1983. The procedural guarantees of the Due Process Clause could not be the source for a body of general federal court law. The Court also found that respondent's injury to reputation was not specially protected by § 1983 and the Due Process Clause. Damage to reputation, alone, apart from some more tangible interests, was not sufficient to invoke the protection of the Due Process Clause. Further, the police chief did not deprive respondent of any state-provided right, and respondent's case was not within the constitutional zone of privacy. The Court reversed the judgment.

== Dissenting opinion ==
Justice Brennan wrote the dissenting opinion which was joined by Justice Marshall and which Justice White concurred in part. Justice Brennan pointed out that the majority's opinion was inconsistent with the Court's prior case law and was unduly restrictive in its construction of the Bill of Rights.

Justice Brennan argued that the majority misread the precedence in Adickes v. S. H. Kress & Co. which they believed supported the idea that the existence of a state remedy (such as a cause of action for defamation) would be relevant to the determination whether there is a separate cause of action under 42 U.S.C. § 1983 citing Monroe v. Pape and McNeese v. Board of Educ. which clarified that the federal remedy is supplementary to the state remedy and that the state remedy need not be first sought and refused before the federal one could be invoked.

Justice Brennan further contended that the majority "by mere fiat and with no analysis, wholly excludes personal interest in reputation from the ambit of "life, liberty, or property" under the Fifth and Fourteenth Amendments, thus rendering due process concerns never applicable to the official stigmatization, however arbitrary, of an individual" adding that "The logical and disturbing corollary of this holding is that no due process infirmities would inhere in a statute constituting a commission to conduct ex party trials of individuals, so long as the only official judgment pronounced was limited to the public condemnation and branding of a person as a Communist, a traitor, an "active murderer," a homosexual, or any other mark that "merely" carries social opprobrium" further pointing out that "The potential of [the majority's holding] is frightening for a free people." and that it finds no support in relevant constitutional jurisprudence.

The Court previously held in Meyer v. Nebraska that "Without doubt, [liberty] denotes not merely freedom from bodily restraint, but also the right of the individual . . . generally to enjoy those privileges long recognized . . . as essential to the orderly pursuit of happiness by free men."

In a concurring opinion in Rosenblatt v. Baer, Justice Stewart pointed out that the individual's right to the protection of his own good name...reflects no more than our basic concept of the essential dignity and worth of every human being—a concept at the root of any decent system of ordered liberty. The protection of private personality, like the protection of life itself, is left primarily to the individual States under the Ninth and Tenth Amendments. But this does not mean that the right is entitled to any less recognition by this Court as a basic of our constitutional system."

Justice Brennan also points out that the majority essentially ignored the case of Jenkins v. McKeithen, a case closely akin to the factual pattern of the current case which was also about an action brought under § 1983, and recognized that the public branding of an individual implicates interests cognizable as either "liberty" or "property" and held that such public condemnation cannot be accomplished without procedural safeguards designed to eliminate arbitrary or capricious executive action.

Justice Brennan went on to say

I have always thought that one of this Court's most important roles is to provide a formidable bulwark against governmental violation of the constitutional safeguards securing in our free society the legitimate expectations of every person to innate human dignity and sense of worth. It is a regrettable abdication of that role and a saddening denigration of our majestic Bill of Rights when the Court tolerates arbitrary and capricious official conduct branding an individual as a criminal without compliance with constitutional procedures designed to ensure the fair and impartial ascertainment of criminal culpability.
