= In re Snyder =

- Supreme Court of the United States

Argued April 16, 1985 Decided June 24, 1985
- Full case name: In re Snyder
- Citations: 472 U.S. 634 (more) 105 S. Ct. 2874; 86 L. Ed. 2d 504

Case history
- Prior: 734 F.2d 334 (8th Cir. 1984)

Holding
- Attorney's allegedly rude letter to a court employee, followed by his refusal to apologize when requested by the court, did not support suspending the attorney from practicing law

Court membership
- Chief Justice Warren E. Burger Associate Justices William J. Brennan Jr. · Byron White; Thurgood Marshall · Harry Blackmun; Lewis F. Powell Jr. · William Rehnquist; John P. Stevens · Sandra Day O'Connor

Case opinion
- Majority: Burger, joined by Brennan, White, Marshall, Powell, Rehnquist, Stevens, O'Connor
- Blackmun took no part in the consideration or decision of the case.

Laws applied
- Rule 46 of the Federal Rules of Appellate Procedure

In re Snyder, 472 U.S. 634 (1985), was a United States Supreme Court case in which the Court held that an attorney's curt letter to a court employee, followed by the attorney's refusal to apologize for sending the letter, did not justify suspending the attorney from practicing law in federal court.

== Background ==
Robert J. Snyder was an attorney in Bismarck, North Dakota. His practice included serving as a criminal defense lawyer for indigent defendants in federal cases, with his compensation provided by government funds under the Criminal Justice Act (CJA). In 1983, Snyder submitted an application for CJA compensation for a case he had handled before Judge Bruce Van Sickle in the District Court. Because the request exceeded $1,000, it was subject to review by the Chief Judge of the Eighth Circuit Court of Appeals, Donald P. Lay. Judge Lay's secretary returned Snyder's application, advising Snyder that his documentation was insufficient. Snyder discussed the situation with Judge Van Sickle's secretary, who suggested that Snyder write her a letter expressing his views.

Snyder wrote to Judge Van Sickle's secretary as she had suggested. In this letter, Snyder complained that the compensation provided under the CJA was inadequate, and protested that "[n]ow, however, not only are we paid an amount of money which does not even cover our overhead, but we have to go through extreme gymnastics even to receive the puny amounts which the federal courts authorize for this work." He said that he would not provide any additional paperwork to support his compensation request, and that "[y]ou can take it or leave it." Snyder closed his letter by stating: "Further, I am extremely disgusted by the treatment of us by the Eighth Circuit in this case, and you are instructed to remove my name from the list of attorneys who will accept criminal indigent defense work. I have simply had it. Thank you for your time and attention."

District Judge Van Sickle viewed Snyder's letter as seeking changes in the court system's procedures for awarding fees under the CJA, and forwarded it to Chief Judge Lay. Lay, however, opined that Snyder's letter was "totally disrespectful to the federal courts and to the judicial system. It demonstrates a total lack of respect for the legal process and the courts." Lay expressed displeasure about Snyder's failure to follow the procedures for fee requests, and opined that this cast doubt on whether Snyder should be allowed to continue practicing law in federal court.

Judge Van Sickle responded that Snyder viewed the letter as "an expression of an honest opinion, and an exercise of his right of freedom of speech." The judge himself described it as "a youthful and exuberant expression of annoyance which has now risen to the level of a cause." Snyder declined to apologize for the letter, although he "assured [Judge Van Sickle] he did not intend the letter as [Judge Lay] interpreted it."

== Eighth Circuit proceedings ==
Judge Lay then issued an order to show cause directing Snyder to explain why he should not be suspended from practicing law in the Eighth Circuit. The stated basis for the order to show cause was Snyder's statement that he would no longer accept case assignments under the CJA. However, at a hearing before the court, the Eighth Circuit judges focused on whether Snyder would apologize for the contents of his letter to the District Court's secretary. Both at the hearing and in writing afterwards, Snyder stated that he would be glad to accept CJA assignments under a revised CJA plan for the District of North Dakota. However, in response to the request for an apology, Snyder wrote:

I cannot, and will never, in justice to my conscience, apologize for what I consider to be telling the truth, albeit in harsh terms.... It is unfortunate that the respective positions in the proceeding have so hardened. However, I consider this to be a matter of principle, and if one stands on a principle, one must be willing to accept the consequences.

A three-judge panel of the Eighth Circuit then issued an opinion and order suspending Snyder from practicing law both in the Eighth Circuit and in the District of North Dakota for at least six months. The full Eighth Circuit denied Snyder's request for rehearing en banc with two judges dissenting, but voted to cancel the suspension if Snyder submitted an apology within ten days. Snyder did not apologize, and the suspension took effect.

Snyder asked the Supreme Court to review the suspension order, contending that the order violated his First Amendment and due process rights and was unjustified. The Supreme Court granted certiorari.

== Opinion of the Court ==
Chief Justice Warren E. Burger delivered the opinion of the Court, which spoke for a unanimous Court, except that Justice Harry A. Blackmun did not participate in the case. Burger's opinion held that Snyder's conduct did not constitute cause for suspending him under Rule 46 of the Federal Rules of Appellate Procedure. Because the case could be resolved on non-constitutional grounds, Burger wrote, the Court need not address Snyder's arguments under the First Amendment or the Due Process Clause.

Burger stated that courts have the power to suspend or disbar lawyers from practicing before them for "conduct unbecoming a member of the bar of the court." This authority is inherent in the nature of a court, and in the case of the United States Courts of Appeals, is codified in Rule 46.

Here, the Eighth Circuit had concluded that Snyder had engaged in "contumacious conduct" and demonstrated unfitness to practice law in federal court when he submitted his letter to a court employee and refused to apologize for it. However, the Supreme Court did "not consider a lawyer's criticism of the administration of the [Criminal Justice] Act or criticism of inequities in assignments under the Act as cause for discipline or suspension."

The Court's opinion concluded:

The record indicates the Court of Appeals was concerned about the tone of the letter; petitioner concedes that the tone of his letter was "harsh," and, indeed it can be read as ill-mannered. All persons involved in the judicial process—judges, litigants, witnesses, and court officers—owe a duty of courtesy to all other participants. The necessity for civility in the inherently contentious setting of the adversary process suggests that members of the bar cast criticisms of the system in a professional and civil tone. However, even assuming that the letter exhibited an unlawyerlike rudeness, a single incident of rudeness or lack of professional courtesy—in this context—does not support a finding of contemptuous or contumacious conduct, or a finding that a lawyer is "not presently fit to practice law in the federal courts." Nor does it rise to the level of "conduct unbecoming a member of the bar" warranting suspension from practice.

Accordingly, Snyder's suspension was reversed.

== See also ==
- List of United States Supreme Court cases, volume 472
