= List of United States Supreme Court cases, volume 424 =

This is a list of all the United States Supreme Court cases from volume 424 of the United States Reports:

Case name	Citation	Date decided
Buckley v. Valeo	424 U.S. 1	1976
Alamo Land & Cattle Co. v. Arizona	424 U.S. 295	1976
Mathews v. Eldridge	424 U.S. 319	1976
De Canas v. Bica	424 U.S. 351	1976
Great Atl. & Pac. Tea Co. v. Cottrell	424 U.S. 366	1976
Fisher v. Dist. Ct.	424 U.S. 382	1976
United States v. Testan	424 U.S. 392	1976
Imbler v. Pachtman	424 U.S. 409	1976
Time, Inc. v. Firestone	424 U.S. 448	1976
FPC v. Moss	424 U.S. 494	1976
Hudgens v. NLRB	424 U.S. 507	1976
United States v. Gaddis	424 U.S. 544	1976
Hines v. Anchor Motor Freight, Inc.	424 U.S. 554	1976
Lavine v. Milne	424 U.S. 577	1976
Ristaino v. Ross	424 U.S. 589	1976
United States v. Dinitz	424 U.S. 600	1976
Comm'r v. Shapiro	424 U.S. 614	1976
East Carroll Parish Sch. Bd. v. Marshall	424 U.S. 636	1976
Bucolo v. Adkins	424 U.S. 641	1976
McCarthy v. Phila. Civil Serv. Comm'n	424 U.S. 645	1976
Garner v. United States	424 U.S. 648	1976
McKinney v. Alabama	424 U.S. 669	1976
Paul v. Davis	424 U.S. 693	1976
Liberty Mut. Ins. Co. v. Wetzel	424 U.S. 737	1976
Franks v. Bowman Transp. Co.	424 U.S. 747	1976
Colo. River Water Conserv. Dist. v. United States	424 U.S. 800	1976
Greer v. Spock	424 U.S. 828	1976
Coleman v. Paccar Inc.	424 U.S. 1301	1976
Bradley v. Lunding	424 U.S. 1309	1976
Flamm v. Real-BLT, Inc.	424 U.S. 1313	1976
