= Time, Inc. v. Firestone =

- Supreme Court of the United States

Argued October 14, 1975 Decided March 2, 1976
- Full case name: Time, Inc. v. Mary Alice Firestone
- Citations: 424 U.S. 448 (more) 96 S. Ct. 958; 47 L. Ed. 2d 154

Case history
- Prior: Florida state court grants $100,000 libel claim for the respondent; affirmed, Firestone v. Time, Inc., 305 So. 2d 172 (Fla. 1974); cert. granted, 421 U.S. 909 (1975).

Holding
- Mary Firestone can collect libel damages from Time, Inc., because she was not a public figure. She had no special prominence in societal affairs, nor did she thrust herself into a controversy to influence its resolution.

Court membership
- Chief Justice Warren E. Burger Associate Justices William J. Brennan Jr. · Potter Stewart; Byron White · Thurgood Marshall; Harry Blackmun · Lewis F. Powell Jr. William Rehnquist · John P. Stevens

Case opinions
- Majority: Rehnquist, joined by Burger, Stewart, Blackmun, Powell
- Concurrence: Powell, joined by Stewart
- Dissent: Brennan
- Dissent: White
- Dissent: Marshall
- Stevens took no part in the consideration or decision of the case.

Laws applied
- U.S. Const. Amend. I; U.S. Const. Amend. XIV

Time, Inc. v. Firestone, 424 U.S. 448 (1976), was a U.S. Supreme Court case concerning defamation suits against public figures.

== Background ==
Mary Alice Firestone was married to Russell A. Firestone, Jr., an heir to the Firestone Tire and Rubber Company family fortune. Mary filed for divorce, and Russell submitted a counterclaim on the grounds of extreme cruelty and adultery. The judge granted the divorce but discounted much of the evidence concerning extramarital affairs. Nevertheless, Time, Inc., publisher of the weekly news magazine Time, ran an article one week after the divorce was granted, mentioning the alleged affairs. In the "Milestones" section of Time, the news of the Firestones’ divorce was published as follows: "DIVORCED. By Russell A. Firestone Jr., 41, heir to the tire fortune: Mary Alice Sullivan Firestone, 32, his third wife; a onetime Palm Beach schoolteacher; on grounds of extreme cruelty and adultery; after six years of marriage, one son; in West Palm Beach, Fla. The 17-month intermittent trial produced enough testimony of extramarital adventures on both sides, said the judge, 'to make Dr. Freud's hair curl.'”

Following the publication, Mary Firestone filed suit in a Florida state court against Time, Inc., seeking $100,000 in damages for libel.

== Court cases ==
Time alleged that Mary was a public figure and could not recover damages based on the ruling of New York Times Co. v. Sullivan (1964), which protected media from liability in such suits except in cases where there is knowledge of falsity or a reckless disregard for truth. Both the state court and Florida Supreme Court ruled that Mary was not a public figure, using language defined in Gertz v. Robert Welch, Inc. (1974).

== Decision ==
In a 5–3 vote, Justice William H. Rehnquist wrote the majority opinion vacating the lower judgment and remanding. The Supreme Court held that the actual malice standard for media reports on public figures did not apply. Firestone was not a public figure as defined by prior precedent. The Court also held the Florida judgment invalid because the court awarded damages without determining fault. Justice Lewis Powell wrote a concurrence, stating that the ultimate question is whether Time exercised reasonably prudent care in light of the ambiguous divorce decree. Justice Potter Stewart joined in the concurrence.

== See also ==
- List of United States Supreme Court cases
- List of United States Supreme Court cases by the Burger Court
- List of United States Supreme Court cases involving the First Amendment
- List of United States Supreme Court cases, volume 424
