= Richardson-Merrell Inc. v. Koller =

- Supreme Court of the United States

Decided June 17, 1985
- Full case name: Richardson-Merrell Inc. v. Koller
- Citations: 472 U.S. 424 (more)

Holding
- To fall within the collateral order exception to the final judgment rule, an order must conclusively determine the disputed question, resolve an important issue completely separate from the merits of the action, and be effectively unreviewable on appeal from a final judgment.

Court membership
- Chief Justice Warren E. Burger Associate Justices William J. Brennan Jr. · Byron White; Thurgood Marshall · Harry Blackmun; Lewis F. Powell Jr. · William Rehnquist; John P. Stevens · Sandra Day O'Connor

Case opinions
- Majority: O'Connor
- Concurrence: Brennan
- Dissent: Stevens
- Powell took no part in the consideration or decision of the case.

Richardson-Merrell Inc. v. Koller, 472 U.S. 424 (1985), was a United States Supreme Court case in which the court held that to fall within the collateral order exception to the final judgment rule, an order must conclusively determine the disputed question, resolve an important issue completely separate from the merits of the action, and be effectively unreviewable on appeal from a final judgment. This case stands for the final judgment rule itself: a party must ordinarily raise all of their appellate issues under one and only one appeal following a final judgment.

== Background ==
Anne Koller was born without arms or legs. She filed suit in federal District Court, alleging that, during pregnancy, her mother had taken an antinausea drug manufactured by Richardson-Merrell, and that this drug had caused her birth defects. Richardson-Merrell was initially represented by Miami and Washington law firms, but a Los Angeles law firm later took the lead in trial preparation. Before trial, the District Court disqualified the Los Angeles firm and revoked the appearances of two of its attorneys because of misconduct. Respondent appealed the disqualification to the D.C. Circuit Court of Appeals, which stayed all proceedings in the District Court pending the outcome of the appeal. The Court of Appeals thereafter held that 28 U.S.C. § 1291—which grants courts of appeals appellate jurisdiction for all "final decisions of the district courts," except where a direct appeal lies to the Supreme Court—confers jurisdiction over interlocutory appeals of orders disqualifying counsel in a civil case. The Court of Appeals then held that the disqualification in question was invalid.

== Opinion of the court ==
The Supreme Court issued an opinion on June 17, 1985.
