= Greer v. Spock =

- Supreme Court of the United States

Argued November, 1975 Decided March 24, 1976
- Full case name: Thomas U. GREER, Commander, Fort Dix Military Reservation, et al., Petitioners, v. Benjamin SPOCK et al
- Citations: 424 U.S. 828 (more)
- Argument: Oral argument

Court membership
- Chief Justice Warren E. Burger Associate Justices William J. Brennan Jr. · Potter Stewart; Byron White · Thurgood Marshall; Harry Blackmun · Lewis F. Powell Jr. William Rehnquist · John P. Stevens

Case opinions
- Majority: Stewart, Rehnquist, Blackmun, White
- Concurrence: Burger
- Concurrence: Powell
- Dissent: Marshall
- Dissent: Brennan
- Stevens took no part in the consideration or decision of the case.

Greer v. Spock, 424 U.S. 828 (1976), is a U.S. Supreme Court case in which the court upheld military regulations strictly forbidding partisan political activity on unrestricted areas of a military base (in this case, Fort Dix and Benjamin Spock's activity) against a First Amendment challenge.
