= Grable & Sons Metal Products, Inc. v. Darue Engineering & Manufacturing =

- Supreme Court of the United States

Argued April 18, 2005 Decided June 13, 2005
- Full case name: Grable and Sons Metal Products, Incorporated v. Darue Engineering and Manufacturing
- Citations: 545 U.S. 308 (more) 125 S. Ct. 2363; 162 L. Ed. 2d 257; 2005 U.S. LEXIS 4659

Case history
- Prior: 207 F. Supp. 2d 694 (W.D. Mich. 2002); affirmed, 377 F.3d 592 (6th Cir. 2004); cert. granted, 543 U.S. 1042 (2005).
- Subsequent: Rehearing denied, 545 U.S. 1158 (2005).

Holding
- That the national interest in providing a federal forum for federal tax litigation is sufficiently substantial to support the exercise of federal-question jurisdiction over the disputed issue on removal.

Court membership
- Chief Justice William Rehnquist Associate Justices John P. Stevens · Sandra Day O'Connor; Antonin Scalia · Anthony Kennedy; David Souter · Clarence Thomas; Ruth Bader Ginsburg · Stephen Breyer

Case opinions
- Majority: Souter, joined by unanimous
- Concurrence: Thomas

Laws applied
- 28 U.S.C. § 1331

Grable & Sons Metal Products, Inc. v. Darue Engineering & Manufacturing, 545 U.S. 308 (2005), was a United States Supreme Court decision involving the jurisdiction of the federal district courts under 28 U.S.C. § 1331 (federal question jurisdiction).

== Background ==
In 1994, the Internal Revenue Service seized real property belonging to Grable & Sons Metal Products, Inc., to satisfy Grable's federal tax delinquency. The IRS sent notice of the tax sale by certified mail. At the tax sale the IRS sold the property to Darue Engineering and Manufacturing. Grable later brought a quiet title action in state court, alleging that the IRS sale was invalid. Grable argued that, under 26 U.S.C. § 6335, the IRS was required to give notice to Grable by personal service, not certified mail. Darue attempted to remove the case to Federal District Court. Darue argued that the federal district court had jurisdiction, because the claim of title depended on the interpretation of the notice statute in the federal tax law.

== Issue ==
The question raised was whether the federal district courts have original federal question jurisdiction under 28 U.S.C. § 1331 when a claim arises out of a federal statute that has not specifically granted a private right to a cause of action.

== Majority opinion ==
The Court affirmed the Sixth Circuit and ruled that there was federal question jurisdiction.

Justice Souter, writing for a unanimous court, held that the federal court had jurisdiction for the following reasons:

- Whether Grable was given notice within the meaning of the federal statute was an essential element of the claim. This was the only legal or factual issue contested in the case.
- The federal government had a strong interest in the prompt and certain collection of delinquent taxes.
- The ability of the IRS to satisfy its claims from the property of delinquents required clear terms of notice to allow buyers like Darue to satisfy themselves that the IRS has touched the bases necessary for good title.
- The Government thus had a direct interest in the availability of a federal forum to vindicate its own administrative action.
- Because it will be the rare quiet title action that raises a contested matter of federal law, federal jurisdiction to resolve genuine disagreement over federal tax title provisions will portend only a microscopic effect on the federal-state division of labor.

== See also ==
- List of United States Supreme Court cases, volume 545
- List of United States Supreme Court cases by the Rehnquist Court
