= Hurley v. Irish-American Gay, Lesbian, and Bisexual Group of Boston =

Hurley v. Irish-American Gay, Lesbian and Bisexual Group of Boston
- Supreme Court of the United States

Argued April 25, 1995 Decided June 19, 1995
- Full case name: John J. Hurley and South Boston Allied War Veterans Council v. Irish-American Gay, Lesbian and Bisexual Group of Boston, Etc.
- Citations: 515 U.S. 557 (more) 115 S. Ct. 2338; 132 L. Ed. 2d 487; 1995 U.S. LEXIS 4050

Holding
- Private citizens organizing a public demonstration may not be compelled by the state to include groups who impart a message the organizers do not want to be included in their demonstration

Court membership
- Chief Justice William Rehnquist Associate Justices John P. Stevens · Sandra Day O'Connor; Antonin Scalia · Anthony Kennedy; David Souter · Clarence Thomas; Ruth Bader Ginsburg · Stephen Breyer

Case opinion
- Majority: Souter, joined by unanimous

Laws applied
- U.S. Const. amend. I

Hurley v. Irish-American Gay, Lesbian, and Bisexual Group of Boston, 515 U.S. 557 (1995), is a landmark decision of the U.S. Supreme Court regarding free speech rights, specifically the rights of groups to determine what message their activities convey to the public. The Court held that a state may not compel private citizens organizing a public demonstration to include groups who impart a message the organizers do not want their demonstration to present, even if the state's intent was to prevent discrimination.

== Background ==
From 1901 until 1947, the city of Boston, Massachusetts, sponsored public celebrations of St. Patrick's Day and Evacuation Day, which marks the departure of British troops from the city in 1776, on or about March 17. Following 1947's events, Mayor James Michael Curley gave authority for organizing the celebratory parade to the South Boston Allied War Veterans Council, a group of unincorporated private citizens selected from a variety of Boston veterans' groups. The South Boston Allied War Veterans Council was the only group to apply for a parade permit until 1992.

In that year, the Irish-American Gay, Lesbian and Bisexual Group of Boston (GLIB) requested that it be allowed to march in the parade alongside the usual participating groups. GLIB argued that it was not a group primarily aimed at conveying a "gay, lesbian, and bisexual message". They said their members were Irish descendants who happen to be gay, lesbian, and bisexual, and who are proud of both their sexual orientation and their Irish ancestral nationality. On March 1, the Council denied GLIB permission to march in the parade. Massachusetts Governor William Weld supported GLIB's position. Boston Mayor Ray Flynn tried without success to broker a compromise. GLIB offered to limit its participation to 25 marchers and police their behavior, winning Flynn's support. The Council voted "overwhelmingly" to reject GLIB's proposal. GLIB sued the Council, the city, and Flynn, and asked the court to compel the Council to allow them to march, citing a Massachusetts law that forbade "discrimination or restriction on account of ... sexual orientation ... relative to the admission of any person to, or treatment in any place of public accommodation, resort or amusement." On March 11, Judge Hiller B. Zobel issued an order restraining the Council from prohibiting GLIB from marching, and the Council did not appeal. GLIB marched in the parade, which the Boston Globe described as "a 5-mile gauntlet of hostility that sometimes threatened to erupt into wide-scale violence" where the GLIB marchers "faced an outpouring of vituperation that spanned generational lines." Several smoke bombs were tossed into their midst. In an editorial the paper concluded that "Despite Sunday's epithets and excesses, the parade went off relatively well", though its reporter decried the "revisionist history ... of wishful thinkers already trying to claim that aw, the crowd reaction to the gay marchers wasn't that bad".

The next year, the Council bolstered its position by declining the funds it normally received from the city in support of the parade and again denied GLIB's application to participate in the parade. The group again filed suit. Judge Zobel again found that GLIB's argument was valid: "The parade is in every rational sense a municipal celebration, a public festival". He reasoned that the parade had traveled roughly the same route for decades, that it frequently (if not always) accepted involvement and participation from the general public, and that it rarely, if ever, required formal submissions to entry into the parade, sometimes permitting groups to join the parade on the day of the event. GLIB stated that it should be permitted to march in the parade because the Council employed no uniform screening process of other groups that had previously been permitted to march with them. While the Council had prohibited certain groups such as the Ku Klux Klan from joining the parade, the trial court believed that these were not significant or germane to the facts presented. The trial court determined that the Council's rights under the First Amendment were not implicated because the parade was less a private event and more of an "open recreational event". Because the statute did not demand that GLIB be allowed in the parade, merely that the Council could not forbid groups based on sexual orientation, any infringement on the Council's right of expressive association was "incidental." Appeals Court Justice Frederick Brown affirmed Zobel's decision.

On appeal to the Supreme Judicial Court of Massachusetts (SJC), Justice Herbert Wilkins affirmed the trial court's decision against the Council. The full SJC declined to hear the case on an emergency basis. The GLIB contingent of 25 marched that year and met a comparatively less hostile environment that included snowballs and smoke bombs and spitting. GLIB obtained a permanent injunction against the Council in December 1993. The Council appealed the permanent injunction and lost in Superior Court where Judge J. Harold Flannery wrote: "History does not record that St. Patrick limited his ministry to heterosexuals or that General Washington's soldiers were all straight. Inclusiveness should be the hallmark of the parade." The full SJC heard arguments on March 10, 1994. It ruled against the Council the next day. When the Court released its written opinion by Chief Justice Paul J. Liacos several weeks later, it reasoned that the law was not overly broad and that it did not unduly infringe upon the Council's First Amendment rights. It agreed with the trial court's finding that the parade, as it had been run, was subject to the "public accommodations" law and that it did not convey any obvious or specific message. The Council cancelled the 1994 parade. For the 1995 parade, the Council announced that it would have a political theme: to protest recent state court decisions. On January 17, 1995, U.S. District Court Judge Mark L. Wolf ruled that, given that the parade was an exercise of the organizers' free speech, the Council could restrict participation to those who endorsed that political stance. He ordered the city of Boston to issue the parade permit it was threatening to withhold. Because Boston Mayor Tom Menino ordered city employees not to participate in their official capacity, fire engines and mounted police did not march. Police estimated participation by marchers and the crowd at about half their levels in similarly good weather.

The Supreme Court granted certiorari on January 6, 1995, and heard oral arguments on April 25.

== Supreme Court's decision ==
Justice Souter delivered the Court's unanimous opinion on June 19, 1995. He reasoned that, even though the Council did not have a narrow, set message that it was intending to convey, the parade nevertheless constituted a message that the Council had a right to protect. Noting that the Council had been fairly unrestrictive in its guidelines for determining which groups to allow to participate in the parade, he said this did not necessarily mean that the Council waived its right to present its message in a way it saw fit. He wrote: "One important manifestation of the principle of free speech is that one who chooses to speak may also decide what not to say". GLIB's attorney, John Ward of Gay & Lesbian Advocates and Defenders, had argued that a banner identifying GLIB by its full name carried no "extrinsic message" and therefore was not speech that could interfere with the parade sponsors' speech rights. Souter interpreted the banner as an attempt to "bear witness to the fact that some Irish are gay, lesbian, or bisexual" who "have as much claim to unqualified social acceptance as heterosexuals and indeed as members of parade units organized around other identifying characteristics". Of primary concern to the Court was that anyone observing the parade could rationally believe that those involved in the parade were all part of an overriding message the Council was seeking to provide. Souter wrote that the Council could not statutorily be prohibited from excluding the messages of groups it did not agree with, nor could it be forced to endorse a message against its will.

The Court's decision affected the Spence test that had been established in Spence v. Washington (418 U.S. 405 (1974)). In Spence the Court has ruled that actions may be protected speech if "an intent to convey a particularized message was present, and in the surrounding circumstances the likelihood was great that the message would be understood by those who viewed it." In Hurley, the Court dismissed the need for a particularized message, stating that a "narrow, succinctly articulable message is not a condition of constitutional protection, which if confined to expressions conveying a 'particularized message,' would never reach the unquestionably shielded painting of Jackson Pollock, music of Arnold Schoenberg, or Jabberwocky verse of Lewis Carroll." The Hurley decision created a circuit split in whether Spence or Hurley was to be used to judge the First Amendment protection of actions, which has yet to be resolved by the Supreme Court as of 2015.

The decision resolved a similar dispute in New York City, where a 1993 U.S. District Court ruling had allowed the city's parade sponsors, the Ancient Order of Hibernians, to exclude homosexual groups that wanted to be able to identify themselves as such.

Catholic officials welcomed the ruling as well. Legal scholar and gay rights supporter Arthur S. Leonard said that "lobbying and education" were better than litigation as a strategy for promoting gay inclusion, but welcomed the ruling because he thought it was "carefully crafted" to the issues raised by the parade "while at the same time upholding the authority of the state to ban sexual-orientation discrimination."

== Aftermath ==
The South Boston Allied Veteran's Council did not permit gay groups to march in the parade until 2015, when it accepted applications from Boston Pride and OUTVETS, a gay veteran's organization. Following this decision, Boston Mayor Marty Walsh announced that he would march in the parade, the first time a mayor had participated in 20 years.

In 2017, LGBT groups were temporarily banned again, before being reallowed a few days later after negative media attention.

== See also ==
- Freedom of association
- List of LGBTQ-related cases in the United States Supreme Court
- National Association for the Advancement of Colored People v. Alabama (1958)
- Roberts v. United States Jaycees (1984)
- Boy Scouts of America v. Dale (2000)
