= Imbler v. Pachtman =

- Supreme Court of the United States

Argued November 3, 1975 Decided March 2, 1976
- Full case name: Paul Kern Imbler, Petitioner, v. Richard Pachtman, District Attorney.
- Citations: 424 U.S. 409 (more) 96 S. Ct. 984; 47 L. Ed. 2d 128; 1976 U.S. LEXIS 25

Case history
- Prior: 500 F.2d 1301 (9th Cir. 1974); cert. granted, 420 U.S. 945 (1975).

Holding
- A state prosecuting attorney who acts within the scope of his duties in initiating and pursuing a criminal prosecution and in presenting the State's case, is absolutely immune from a civil suit for damages under § 1983 for alleged deprivations of the accused's constitutional rights.

Court membership
- Chief Justice Warren E. Burger Associate Justices William J. Brennan Jr. · Potter Stewart; Byron White · Thurgood Marshall; Harry Blackmun · Lewis F. Powell Jr. William Rehnquist · John P. Stevens

Case opinions
- Majority: Powell, joined by Burger, Stewart, Blackmun, Rehnquist
- Concurrence: White, joined by Brennan, Marshall
- Stevens took no part in the consideration or decision of the case.

Imbler v. Pachtman, 424 U.S. 409 (1976), was a United States Supreme Court case in which district attorneys or prosecutors were found to have full immunity from civil suits resulting from their government duties.

Imbler, a defendant in a murder trial, had been convicted and sentenced when the district attorney, Pachtman, revealed new evidence that he said had recently surfaced and which exonerated Imbler. Imbler used the new evidence to successfully free himself, then brought up a civil suit alleging that Pachtman had withheld evidence. The suit, however, was dismissed on the grounds that Pachtman had prosecutorial immunity, a finding which the Supreme Court affirmed.

== See also ==
- List of United States Supreme Court cases, volume 424
