= Minneapolis Star Tribune Co. v. Commissioner =

Minneapolis Star Tribune Company v. Commissioner
- Supreme Court of the United States

Argued January 12, 1983 Decided March 29, 1983
- Full case name: Minneapolis Star Tribune Company v. Commissioner
- Citations: 460 U.S. 575 (more) 103 S. Ct. 1365; 75 L. Ed. 2d 295; 1983 U.S. LEXIS 6

Case history
- Prior: 314 N.W.2d 201 (Min. 1981)

Holding
- Special taxes imposed on ink and paper are unconstitutional under the First Amendment.

Court membership
- Chief Justice Warren E. Burger Associate Justices William J. Brennan Jr. · Byron White; Thurgood Marshall · Harry Blackmun; Lewis F. Powell Jr. · William Rehnquist; John P. Stevens · Sandra Day O'Connor

Case opinions
- Majority: O'Connor, joined by Burger, Brennan, Marshall, Stevens, Powell (in full); White (in part; Blackmun (in part)
- Concur/dissent: White
- Dissent: Rehnquist

Laws applied
- U.S. Const. amend. I

Minneapolis Star Tribune Company v. Commissioner, 460 U.S. 575 (1983), was an opinion of the Supreme Court of the United States authored by Justice Sandra Day O'Connor overturning a use tax on paper and ink in excess of $100,000 consumed in any calendar year. The Minneapolis Star Tribune initially paid the tax and sued for a refund.

== Opinion of the Court ==
On its face, this ruling finds that state tax systems cannot treat the press differently from any other business without significant and substantial justification. Writing for the Court Justice O'Connor explains that "[b]y creating this special use tax, which to our knowledge is without parallel in the State's tax scheme, Minnesota has singled out the press for special treatment". The state of Minnesota demonstrated no such justification to impose a special tax on a select few newspaper publishers. Therefore, this tax was in violation of the First Amendment's guarantee of freedom of the press.

Justice O'Connor writes that there is evidence that "differential taxation of the press would have troubled the Framers of the First Amendment". The Anti-Federalists objected that no guarantee of free press was included in the initial proposal of the Constitution. She quotes Richard Henry Lee.

An alternative means exists of achieving the state interest of raising revenue like general taxation of businesses.

== See also ==
- Grosjean v. American Press Co. (1936)
- List of United States Supreme Court cases, volume 460
