= United States v. O'Brien =

- Supreme Court of the United States

Argued January 24, 1968 Decided May 27, 1968
- Full case name: United States v. David Paul O'Brien
- Citations: 391 U.S. 367 (more) 88 S. Ct. 1673; 20 L. Ed. 2d 672; 1968 U.S. LEXIS 2910

Case history
- Prior: Defendant convicted, D. Mass.; conviction affirmed, sentence vacated and remanded, 376 F.2d 538 (1st Cir. 1967); rehearing denied, 1st Cir., 4-28-67; cert. granted, 389 U.S. 814 (1967).
- Subsequent: Rehearing denied, 393 U.S. 900 (1968).

Holding
- A criminal prohibition against burning draft cards did not violate the First Amendment, because its effect on speech was only incidental, and it was justified by the significant government interest in maintaining an efficient and effective military draft system. First Circuit Court of Appeals vacated and remanded.

Court membership
- Chief Justice Earl Warren Associate Justices Hugo Black · William O. Douglas; John M. Harlan II · William J. Brennan Jr. Potter Stewart · Byron White; Abe Fortas · Thurgood Marshall

Case opinions
- Majority: Warren, joined by Black, Harlan, Brennan, Stewart, White, Fortas
- Concurrence: Harlan
- Dissent: Douglas
- Marshall took no part in the consideration or decision of the case.

Laws applied
- U.S. Const. art. I; U.S. Const. amend. I; 50 U.S.C. § 462(b)(3) (1965 amendment to the Universal Military Training and Service Act of 1948)

United States v. O'Brien, 391 U.S. 367 (1968), is a landmark decision of the United States Supreme Court, ruling that a criminal prohibition against burning a draft card did not violate the First Amendment's guarantee of free speech. Though the court recognized that O'Brien's conduct was expressive as a protest against the Vietnam War, it considered the law justified by a significant government interest unrelated to the suppression of speech and was tailored towards that end.

O'Brien upheld the government's power to prosecute what was becoming a pervasive method of anti-war protest. Its more significant legacy, however, was its application of a new constitutional standard. The test articulated in O'Brien has been subsequently used by the court to analyze whether laws that have the effect of regulating speech, though are ostensibly neutral towards the content of that speech, violate the First Amendment. Though the O'Brien test has rarely invalidated laws that the court has found to be "content neutral" (although Buckley v. Valeo, 1976, arguably entailed such a partial invalidation), it has given those engaging in expressive conduct—from wearing of black armbands to burning of flags— an additional tool to invoke against prohibitions.

== Background of the case ==
=== Draft cards under the Selective Service Act ===
In 1948, the United States instituted a peace-time draft with the Universal Military Training and Service Act (also called the Selective Service Act), which required all male American citizens to register with a local draft board upon reaching the age of 18. In 1965, Congress amended the act to prohibit the willful destruction of "draft cards" or registration certificates. These were small white cards bearing the registrant's identifying information, the date and place of registration, and his Selective Service number, which indicated his state of registration, local board, birth year, and his chronological position in the local board's classification record.

The act had already required all eligible men to carry the certificate at all times, and prohibited alterations that would perpetrate a forgery or fraud. The 1965 amendment, however, made it a separate crime under 50 U.S.C. § 462(b)(3) to "knowingly destroy" or "knowingly mutilate" the card. This amendment was passed at a time when public burnings of draft cards to protest the Vietnam War were a growing phenomenon; many (including the U.S. Court of Appeals for the First Circuit) believed that Congress had intentionally targeted such protesters. (Note: On the intent behind the amendment, the Court of Appeals wrote, "We would be closing our eyes in the light of the prior law if we did not see on the face of the amendment that it was precisely directed at public as distinguished from private destruction. In other words, a special offense was committed by persons such as the defendant who made a spectacle of their disobedience.")

=== O'Brien's protest and conviction ===
On the morning of March 31, 1966, David Paul O'Brien and three companions burned their draft cards on the steps of the South Boston Courthouse, in front of a crowd that happened to include several FBI agents. After the four men came under attack from some of the crowd, an FBI agent ushered O'Brien inside the courthouse and advised him of his rights. O'Brien proudly confessed to the agent and produced the charred remains of the certificate. He was subsequently indicted for violating § 462(b)(3) and put on trial in the U.S. District Court for the District of Massachusetts.

O'Brien insisted on representing himself at his trial and argued that the act was unconstitutional. He explained to the jury that he burned the draft card publicly to persuade others to oppose the war, "so that other people would reevaluate their positions with Selective Service, with the armed forces, and reevaluate their place in the culture of today, to hopefully consider my position". O'Brien was convicted and sentenced to the maximum of six years, as a "youth offender" under the now-repealed Youth Corrections Act, which submitted him to the custody of the Attorney General "for supervision and treatment". (Note: This provision of the Youth Corrections Act was formerly codified at 18 U.S.C. § 5010(b).)

=== Appeal ===
On appeal, the First Circuit Court of Appeals ruled that the 1965 amendment ran afoul of the First Amendment because it singled out "persons engaging in protest for special treatment". However, although O'Brien could not be convicted for protesting, the First Amendment could not protect him from being required to carry a draft card. The court believed that all the factual issues necessary for a "nonpossession" conviction had been fully litigated, and so affirmed his conviction on that basis and remanded for appropriate resentencing.

Both O'Brien and the United States petitioned for review by the Supreme Court, with the government in United States v. O'Brien (No. 232) challenging the lower court's invalidation of § 462(b)(3) and O'Brien challenging in the nonpossession conviction in O'Brien v. United States (No. 233). (Note: Solicitor General Erwin N. Griswold argued the case before the Supreme Court for the United States; he was joined on the brief by Assistant Attorney General Fred M. Vinson, Jr. (the son of the late Chief Justice Fred M. Vinson), Assistant Solicitor General Francis X. Beytagh, Jr., and Dept. of Justice Attorneys Beatrice Rosenberg and Jerome M. Feit. Marvin M. Karpatkin, an attorney for the American Civil Liberties Union, argued for O'Brien.) The court decided both actions together and, in a 7–1 decision, upheld the constitutionality of § 462(b)(3), vacated the First Circuit's decision and reinstated O'Brien's sentence. O'Brien had also argued to the court that the First Circuit had unconstitutionally sustained his conviction for a crime of which he was neither convicted nor tried, and much of the court's questioning of the government during oral argument challenged this ruling. However, with that decision vacated, the court did not reach that issue.

== Supreme Court's decision ==
Chief Justice Earl Warren's decision for the court rejected O'Brien's argument that the 1965 amendment to § 462(b)(3) was only passed to stifle the speech of anti-war protesters. The law did not restrict speech on its face, but instead only addressed conduct that was not necessarily expressive, and applied without regard to whether the draft card was destroyed in private or before an audience. It also did not matter to the court if Congress had passed it with the intention of stifling protest, as long as it could be justified on another basis; Chief Justice Warren declared that "this Court will not strike down an otherwise constitutional statute on the basis of an alleged illicit legislative motive".

Despite finding that § 462(b)(3) only prohibited conduct, the court continued its First Amendment inquiry to determine whether the rule was unduly restrictive of the element of O'Brien's conduct that was expressive. The court plainly questioned whether this communicative element was "sufficient to bring into play the First Amendment" in O'Brien's case. Nevertheless, Justice Harlan, in his concurring opinion, recognized this as the "crux" of the court's decision.

Warren wrote that when a regulation prohibits conduct that combines "speech" and "nonspeech" elements, "a sufficiently important governmental interest in regulating the nonspeech element can justify incidental limitations on First Amendment freedoms". The regulation must

1. be within the constitutional power of the government to enact,
2. further an important or substantial government interest,
3. that interest must be unrelated to the suppression of speech (or "content neutral", as later cases have phrased it), and
4. prohibit no more speech than is essential to further that interest.

The court ruled that § 462(b)(3) satisfied this test.

First, the law was, to the court, unquestionably within the "broad and sweeping" constitutional powers of Congress under Article I to "raise and support armies" by "classify[ing] and conscript[ing] manpower for military service". Under the second prong of the test, the issuance of registration certificates was regarded as a "legitimate and substantial administrative aid" in the functioning of the draft system, as were laws that insured the "continuing availability" of issued draft cards. The court rejected O'Brien's characterization of the draft cards as nothing more than a superfluous notification of registration. Instead, the cards advanced "the smooth and proper functioning of the system" through functions such as providing proof of registration, facilitating contact between the registrant and draft board, reminding the registrant of the need to notify the board of changes of address, and further preventing fraud or forgery. Third, the registration and raising of troops was unrelated to the suppression of speech. And fourth, the court saw "no alternative means" by which the government could ensure that draft cards would continue to be available than a law that prohibited their willful destruction.

Both the government's interest and § 462(b)(3), Warren wrote, "are limited to the noncommunicative aspect of O'Brien's conduct. The governmental interest and the scope of the 1965 Amendment are limited to preventing harm to the smooth and efficient functioning of the Selective Service System. When O'Brien deliberately rendered unavailable his registration certificate, he willfully frustrated this governmental interest. For this noncommunicative impact of his conduct, and for nothing else, he was convicted."

=== Harlan's concurrence ===
Justice John Marshall Harlan II, though joining Warren's opinion, wrote a brief separate concurrence. Harlan wished to extend First Amendment protection to instances in which, though the majority's test was satisfied, the regulation at issue additionally had "the effect of entirely preventing a 'speaker' from reaching a significant audience with whom he could not otherwise lawfully communicate". This was adopted in later cases by the court as an additional prong of the O'Brien test, that the regulation must leave (as phrased in later decisions) "ample alternative channels" of communication. As Harlan felt that O'Brien had other means by which he could communicate his message, he had no problem affirming his conviction.

=== Douglas's dissent ===
Justice William O. Douglas was the sole dissenter. Though he did not express disagreement with the court's First Amendment analysis, he believed that the asserted government interest was only valid when the nation was in a state of war as declared by Congress (which had not been the case since World War II). Douglas questioned whether a peacetime draft was even constitutional, and wanted to reschedule O'Brien for reargument along with two cases challenging the draft that were denied review by the court the same day O'Brien was handed down, even though the parties in O'Brien had not presented arguments or briefs on that issue.

== Subsequent developments ==
=== Vietnam War protests and developments in the draft ===
As the Vietnam War became more unpopular, the draft became more of a focal point for opposition and, despite O'Brien, public protests involving the burning of draft cards proliferated. Though the court has not revisited this specific issue, the court ruled for other anti-war protesters very soon after O'Brien in Tinker v. Des Moines Independent Community School District, which involved public school students who were suspended for wearing black armbands, and Cohen v. California, in which a man was convicted for disturbing the peace by wearing a jacket that read "Fuck the Draft" in a state courthouse.

Due in part to increasing domestic opposition, the United States reduced its involvement in Vietnam and completed withdrawal of its forces in 1973; the draft ended the same year. On January 21, 1977, the day after his inauguration, President Jimmy Carter signed Executive Order 11967, which granted a full pardon to anyone who had committed or been convicted of a non-violent violation of the Selective Service Act. This included everyone from draft dodgers to protestors such as O'Brien. The pardon covered all such acts committed between August 4, 1964, the date of the Gulf of Tonkin Incident, and March 28, 1973, the end of American withdrawal.

In 1980, however, Congress reinstated the requirement that young men register with the Selective Service System, but without reinstating an active draft. In 1984, the Supreme Court upheld the registration requirement against a claim that it violated the privilege against self-incrimination. The following year, it upheld the conviction of a man who refused to register despite his argument that this refusal constituted a political protest. As of 2022, male citizens (and many male noncitizen residents) between the ages of 18 and 25 are still required to register for preparation should a military draft be reinstated. The same provision in § 462(b)(3) of the act under which O'Brien was convicted remains law, though destroying draft cards is no longer a common form of protest and recent arrests for that offense are unknown.

=== Subsequent First Amendment decisions ===
For a few years following O'Brien, the decision was primarily cited to by the court for the proposition that an illicit legislative motive would not render a law unconstitutional. Finally, in 1972, the court relied in part on O'Brien to invalidate a law that prohibited picketing outside public schools that was not related to a labor dispute. Quoting O'Brien, the court held that the law "imposes a selective restriction on expressive conduct far 'greater than is essential to the furtherance of [a substantial governmental] interest'".

Two years later, the court declared in Spence v. Washington that the O'Brien test was "inapplicable" when the asserted government interest "directly related to expression in the context of activity". Spence ruled that a man who displayed an American flag with a peace symbol taped to it was engaging in protected expression; in 1989, the court similarly upheld the right to burn the American flag as expressive conduct in Texas v. Johnson.

The court revisited the necessary fit between the important governmental interest and the means to actualize that interest in Clark v. C.C.N.V., 468 U.S. 288 (1984), in which it held that the nexus need merely be reasonable. The court also merged its doctrine of time-place-manner restrictions and the O'Brien test into an intermediate scrutiny hybrid.

== See also ==
- List of United States Supreme Court cases, volume 391
- Conscription in the United States
- Opposition to the Vietnam War
- Symbolic speech
