= Absolute immunity =

Form of total legal immunity for government officials

In United States law, absolute immunity is a type of legal immunity for government officials that confers complete immunity from criminal prosecution and suits for damages, so long as officials are acting within the scope of their duties. The Supreme Court of the United States has consistently held that government officials deserve some type of immunity from lawsuits for damages, and that the common law recognized this immunity. The Court reasons that this immunity is necessary to protect public officials from excessive interference with their responsibilities and from "potentially disabling threats of liability."

Absolute immunity contrasts with qualified immunity, which sometimes applies when certain officials may have violated constitutional rights or federal law.

== Types ==
In the United States, absolute civil immunity applies to the following people and circumstances:

- lawmakers engaged in the legislative process;
- judges acting in their judicial capacity;
- government prosecutors while acting in their prosecutorial capacity;
- executive officers while performing adjudicative functions;
- the President of the United States while performing official acts;
- Presidential aides who first show that the functions of their office are so sensitive as to require absolute immunity, and who then show that they were performing those functions when performing the act at issue;
- witnesses while testifying in court (although they are still subject to perjury);
- lawyers in certain circumstances related to fraud

=== Presidential immunity ===
Although the U.S. president is frequently sued in his governmental capacity, he normally is not sued in his personal capacity as being personally liable. In 1982, the Supreme Court held in Nixon v. Fitzgerald that the president enjoys absolute immunity from civil litigation for official acts undertaken while in office. The Court suggested that this immunity was broad (though not limitless), applying to acts within the "outer perimeter" of the president's official duties. Fifteen years after Fitzgerald, the Supreme Court held in Clinton v. Jones that the president does not possess absolute immunity from civil litigation surrounding acts he carried out that were not part of his official duties (which is often incorrectly presented as referring only to acts carried out before becoming president). The 2020 Supreme Court decision in Trump v. Vance held that the president is subject to subpoenas in criminal prosecutions for personal conduct with the same legal threshold as anyone else.

The extent to which presidential immunity applies to criminal offenses was disputed. There are non-contemporaneous reports that Ulysses S. Grant was arrested for speeding by horse while in office, although the historicity of this narrative is unclear. There have been criminal investigations of three sitting presidents (Richard Nixon, Bill Clinton, and Donald Trump), but no prosecutions. Memoranda from the Office of Legal Counsel issued in 1973 and 2000 internally prohibit the Department of Justice from prosecuting a president, which some legal scholars have criticized but others have endorsed.

In defense against federal criminal prosecution for his alleged 2020 election subversion, in January 2024 Donald Trump argued to the DC Circuit Court of Appeals that a president enjoys absolute immunity for criminal acts conducted while in office. The next month, a three-judge panel of the court unanimously ruled against Trump. It was the first time an appeals court had addressed such a presidential immunity matter, since no other sitting or former president had ever been criminally indicted.

In Trump v. United States, on July 1, 2024, the Supreme Court ruled that presidents were entitled to absolute immunity from exercising core powers enumerated by the constitution, presumption of immunity for "outer perimeter" actions, and no immunity for unofficial actions. The case was sent back to lower courts to determine which actions in the criminal complaint should be classified as official vs. unofficial. The ruling was the first time the courts granted a president criminal immunity.

=== Prosecutorial immunity ===
In 1976, the Supreme Court ruled in Imbler v. Pachtman that prosecutors cannot be sued for injuries caused by their official actions during trial. For instance, a prosecutor cannot be sued for purposely withholding exculpatory evidence, even if that act results in a wrongful conviction. Absolute prosecutorial immunity also exists for acts closely related to the criminal process' judicial phase.

However, the Supreme Court has held that prosecutors do not enjoy absolute immunity when they act as investigators by engaging in activities associated more closely with police functions. Further, the U.S. Court of Appeals for the First Circuit held in a 2019 decision that a prosecutor is not entitled to absolute prosecutorial discretion when performing purely administrative functions concerning a criminal prosecution. Additionally, the Seventh Circuit has ruled that a prosecutor is not immune from liability for fabricating evidence during pre-trial investigations and then introducing that evidence at trial.

=== Judicial immunity ===
Absolute judicial immunity applies when judges act in their judicial capacity, but not when they take executive actions like leading a search or personally jailing people. A judge enjoys this immunity when they exceed their jurisdiction, but not when they act without any jurisdiction. Judicial immunity also extends to non-judges when they act in a judicial or quasi-judicial capacity, such as a court-appointed referee in an equitable distribution case. Determining whether someone is acting in a judicial capacity and thus deserves absolute immunity requires using a functional test; that is, one must determine whether the person is acting functionally similarly to a judge.

=== Testimonial immunity ===
In 2019, the Trump administration resisted efforts by House Democrats to compel Trump aides to testify, asserting that close aides to the president enjoy absolute immunity from providing testimony to Congress. But a federal judge ruled against the administration, stating that close presidential advisors—even those working in national security—do not possess absolute immunity from testifying in congressional inquiries, though these officials may invoke executive privilege whenever it is appropriate. The U.S. Department of Justice is appealing the decision. Previously, both Republican and Democratic presidential administrations had asserted absolute immunity in contexts like this, but the doctrine has been mostly untested in the judiciary.

== Controversy ==
Some scholars urge courts to reconsider the scope of certain forms of absolute immunity, particularly prosecutorial immunity. They insist that absolute prosecutorial immunity is not supported by either public policy or history, and that applying this doctrine in everyday situations is needlessly unworkable. Meanwhile, others push back, arguing that prosecutorial immunity is necessary to protect public servants from frivolous lawsuits.

== See also ==
- Qualified immunity
- Sovereign immunity
