= Spence v. Washington =

- Supreme Court of the United States

Argued January 9, 1974 Decided June 25, 1974
- Full case name: Harold Omond Spence v. Washington
- Citations: 418 U.S. 405 (more)

Case history
- Prior: Appellant convicted sub nom. State v. Spence; conviction reversed, 5 Wash. App. 752, 490 P.2d 1321 (1971); reversed, 81 Wash. 2d 788, 506 P.2d 293 (1973); probable jurisdiction noted, 414 U.S. 815 (1973)

Holding
- A Washington state statute forbidding displaying the American flag affixed with decorations, as applied to appellant's activity, impermissibly infringed a form of protected expression.

Court membership
- Chief Justice Warren E. Burger Associate Justices William O. Douglas · William J. Brennan Jr. Potter Stewart · Byron White; Thurgood Marshall · Harry Blackmun; Lewis F. Powell Jr. · William Rehnquist

Case opinions
- Per curiam
- Concurrence: Blackmun
- Concurrence: Douglas
- Dissent: Burger
- Dissent: Rehnquist, joined by Burger, White

Spence v. Washington, 418 U.S. 405 (1974), was a United States Supreme Court case dealing with non-verbal free speech and its protections under the First Amendment. The Court, in a per curiam decision, ruled that a Washington state law that banned the display of the American flag adorned with additional decorations was unconstitutional as it violated protected speech. The case established the Spence test that has been used by the judicial system to determine when non-verbal speech may be sufficiently expressive for First Amendment protections.

== Background ==
In May 1970, Harold Spence, a college student in Seattle, Washington, had hung an American flag on his apartment window, displayed upside-down and adorned with peace symbols as a means to protest the United States' recent actions in the invasion of Cambodia and the Kent State shootings. Police officers saw the flag and after speaking to Spence, arrested him. Rather than being charged under Washington's flag desecration statute, Spence was charged with violating the state's "improper use" statute, which disallowed the public display of the American flag with any additional adornments.

Spence requested a jury trial at the King County Superior Court. There, he argued his motives for displaying the adorned flag in protest of recent actions by the U.S. government. The jury found him guilty, amounting to 10 days suspended sentence and a small fine. Spence appealed to the Washington Court of Appeals, which overturned the conviction on the basis that the ruling did not consider Spence's intent, and the statute enforced in this way violated the First and Fourteenth Amendments. The state appealed to the Washington Supreme Court which reversed the Court of Appeals ruling and reinstated the conviction.

== Supreme Court ==
The student petitioned to the Supreme Court based on the lower court rulings. Oral arguments were heard on January 9, 1974, and the Court published its per curiam decision on June 25, 1974. The unsigned opinion stated that with non-verbal communications, it was "necessary to determine whether [this] activity was sufficiently imbued with elements of communication to fall within the scope of the First [...] Amendment". A two-part test was used:

- Intent to convey a particularized message: the Court considered that the student specifically displayed the flag as protest against the government's recent actions, and thus there was clear intent that the student displayed the flag to send a message.
- The message would be understood by those who viewed it: The Court believed that "in the surrounding circumstances" - the timing of the message relative to the government's actions, its public display, and the use of peace symbols would evoke a clear meaning to most that viewed it.

While Washington state had defended the law as a need to preserve the flag as a national symbol, the Court pointed out that the student had not done any act that desecrated the flag nor harmed public or government property, nor meant to incite violence with the display, and thus the state had no compelling interest to deny the student his First Amendment rights.

While the opinion was per curiam and unsigned, Justices Harry Blackmun and William O. Douglas concurred separately. Justice Blackmun concurred in result without opinion. Justice Douglas concurred in a separate opinion, relying on symbolic speech grounds. Chief Justice Warren Burger and Justice William Rehnquist wrote separate dissents, with Chief Justice Burger and Justice Byron White joining Rehnquist. Both dissents expressed concern that the Court's decision overreached the state's authority to enforce its own laws.

It is unclear why the opinion was not signed.

== Impact ==
The Court's decision established the Spence test as a means to determine when non-verbal activities can be considered expressive to qualify for First Amendment protections: "An intent to convey a particularized message was present, and in the surrounding circumstances the likelihood was great that the message would be understood by those who viewed it." The Spence test was used in the Supreme Court's ruling in Texas v. Johnson (491 U.S. 397 (1989)) which ruled that states' flag desecration laws were unconstitutional since they infringed on actions deemed expressive speech under a Spence evaluation. Johnson notably altered the formation of the Spence test by removing the "surrounding circumstances" phrase, creating the Spence-Johnson test which focuses on the particularized message and the likelihood that message would be understood.

Robert Post, a professor of law at Yale University, questioned the nature of the Spence test, as "is transparently and manifestly false. The test cannot plausibly be said to express a sufficient condition for bringing 'the First Amendment into play.'". Post argued that the Spence test would allow for graffiti that defaces property to be protected under the First Amendment, while abstract works of art such as Andy Warhol's Sleep or Marcel Duchamp's Fountain, where the intended message would be difficult to understand, would fail the Spence test, despite clear recognition as works of art normally protected by the First Amendment. The Supreme Court case Hurley v. Irish-American Gay, Lesbian, and Bisexual Group of Boston (515 U.S. 557 (1995)) subsequently altered the Spence test. In Hurley, parade organizers denied participation by an LGBT group, arguing that the group's message did not fit the theme of the parade, meant to celebrate St. Patrick's Day and Evacuation Day. The unanimous Supreme Court ruled in favor of the parade organizers in that the parade was a form of expression and protected by the First Amendment, even if the parade did not have a single, clear message. In the opinion, the Court ruled counter to Spence that a "narrow, succinctly articulable message is not a condition of constitutional protection, which if confined to expressions conveying a 'particularized message,' would never reach the unquestionably shielded painting of Jackson Pollock, music of Arnold Schoenberg, or Jabberwocky verse of Lewis Carroll."

Hurley's take on Spence created a circuit split in the following years on the particulars of whether actions qualify as expressive, protected speech, which, as of 2015, had yet to be revolved by the Supreme Court. Some circuits have favored Spence, others Hurley, and yet others even have taken a hybrid approach of both, called the Spence-Hurley test.
