= Clark v. Community for Creative Non-Violence =

- Supreme Court of the United States

Argued March 21, 1984 Decided June 29, 1984
- Full case name: William P. Clark, Jr., Secretary of the Interior, et al. v. Community for Creative Non-Violence, et al.
- Citations: 468 U.S. 288 (more) 104 S. Ct. 3065; 82 L. Ed. 2d 221; 1984 U.S. LEXIS 136; 52 U.S.L.W. 4986
- Argument: Oral argument

Case history
- Prior: Community for Creative Non-Violence v. Watt, 703 F.2d 586 (D.C. Cir. 1983); cert. granted, 464 U.S. 812 (1983).

Holding
- A rule against camping or overnight sleeping in public parks is not beyond the constitutional power of the Government to enforce

Court membership
- Chief Justice Warren E. Burger Associate Justices William J. Brennan Jr. · Byron White; Thurgood Marshall · Harry Blackmun; Lewis F. Powell Jr. · William Rehnquist; John P. Stevens · Sandra Day O'Connor

Case opinions
- Majority: White, joined by Burger, Blackmun, Powell, Rehnquist, Stevens, O'Connor
- Concurrence: Burger
- Dissent: Marshall, joined by Brennan

Laws applied
- U.S. Const. amend. I

Clark v. Community for Creative Non-Violence, 468 U.S. 288 (1984), is a United States Supreme Court case with the National Park Service's regulation which specifically prohibited sleeping in Lafayette Park and the National Mall at issue. The Community for Creative Non-Violence (CCNV) group had planned to hold a demonstration on the National Mall and Lafayette Park where they would erect tent cities to raise awareness of the situation of the homeless. The group obtained the correct permits for a seven-day demonstration starting on the first day of winter. The Park Service however denied the request that participants be able to sleep in the tents. The CCNV challenged this regulation on the basis that it violated their First Amendment right.

== Background ==
The Community for Creative Non-Violence is a group based in Washington D.C., with a mission "to ensure that the rights of the homeless and poor are not infringed upon and that every person has access to life's basic essentials—food, shelter, clothing and medical care". Since 1978 the group served a Thanksgiving meal for the homeless in Washington, D.C. By November 26, 1981, the group had changed locations of the gathering and ended up in Lafayette Park near the White House. The event gained media attention as the poor were eating a warm meal with 1600 Pennsylvania Avenue in the background. In addition to the feast a few members set up ten tents in the form of a village. The group proclaimed "Welcome to Reaganville / Population growing daily / Reaganomics at work." The name references the depression-era "Hoovervilles" that were camps of the homeless. The group stated they would try and continue the protest into the winter. The Park Police stated that the Thanksgiving dinner had a legal permit but that overnight sleeping would not be tolerated. The next day, November, 26th, police removed the homeless from the area. CCNV obtained pro bono legal representation from the Institute for Public Representation, a clinic of Georgetown University Law Center. On November 30 the CCNV obtained a one-week renewable permit. This permit stated that:

(i)n connection with permitted demonstrations or special events, temporary structures ... shall be permitted

The permit however did not explicitly state sleeping may occur. On December 17, 1981, the CCNV appealed to the District Court for summary judgment for their complaint and for entry of a permanent injunction. The United States Government motioned to have the case dismissed which was subsequently denied. On December 23 the District Court for the District of Columbia ruled in favor of CCNV and stated:

Plaintiffs are entitled to sleep in the nine (9) tents which plaintiffs have placed in Lafayette Park pursuant to a valid permit issued by defendants. Plaintiffs are not entitled to engage in "camping activities," such as the preparation or service of food in Lafayette Park.

The District Court stayed the judgment and injunction pending the Government's appeal to the Court of Appeals. The United States Government subsequently filed for appeal. The Appeals Court examined the National Park Service's Administrative Policy Statement that stated:

Camping is prohibited in all park areas except those specially designated as official campsites (36 C.F.R. 50.27). The National Park Service does permit the use of symbolic campsites reasonably related to First Amendment activities. However, camping primarily for living accommodation must be confined to designated campsites

The Appeals Court felt that the appellees were clearly engaged in political protest and therefore a "symbolic campsites" and that there was no evidence suggesting that the handful of tents in Lafayette Park was intended "primarily for living accommodation." The Opinion of the Court concluded with:

For the foregoing reasons, we find it clear from the Record before us and from the National Park Service's Administrative Policy Statement that these protesters may lawfully sleep in their symbolic campsite. That conclusion necessarily follows from the National Park Service's interpretation of its own regulations. On this basis, the order of the District Court is Affirmed.

As a result of the court's decision, CCNV successfully staged its demonstration, including sleeping, for approximately seven weeks during the winter of that year. Sometime later the National Park Service revised its camping regulations for the National Capital Region. The new regulations stated:

when it reasonably appears, in light of all the circumstances, that the participants, in conducting these activities, are in fact using the area as a living accommodation regardless of the intent of the participants or the nature of any other activities in which they may also be engaging.

CCNV planned to hold another demonstration the following winter and was to include 60 tents total with 20 tents in a quadrant of Lafayette Park and 40 tents on the National Mall. The CCNV filed on September 7, 1982, for a permit. The National Park Service granted a permit "to set up two symbolic campsites, one on the Mall with a maximum of one hundred participants and forty tents, and one in Lafayette Park with approximately fifty participants and twenty tents". The permit granted the ability to have a twenty-four-hour presence at the locations but did not allow the participants to sleep. The CCNV then sought a court order invalidating the permit's limitation on sleeping as an unconstitutional restriction on their freedom of expression. They argued that part of the core message the demonstrators wished to convey was that homeless people have no permanent place to sleep. The District Court for the District of Columbia ruled in favor of the National Park Service. The Court ruled that:(1) CCNV's demonstration falls within the scope of the amended anti-camping regulations; (2) sleeping, within the context of CCNV's demonstration, falls outside the scope of the first amendment; and (3) even assuming first amendment scrutiny is required, the new anti-camping regulations are constitutional as applied to CCNV's proposed sleeping activities. The group appealed to the District of Columbia Circuit Court of Appeals where their case was heard. The Appeals Court re-examined the three reasons the District Court did not grant the CCNV injunction. They agreed with the notion that the National Park Service's regulation fit the CCNV's demonstration. Concerning the claim that "CCNV's demonstration, falls outside the scope of the first amendment" the court wrote in the opinion:

Indeed, we cannot understand how the government can deny the indicia of political expression that permeate CCNV's pointed use of the simple act of sleeping. The protestors choose to sleep, purposely across from the White House and Capitol grounds, in sparsely appointed tents which the Park Service has already designated as undeniably "symbolic." Their permit application states that this conduct is intended to send the same message as this court recognized was sent in CCNV's 1981-82 demonstration: that the problems of the homeless will not simply disappear into the night.

In concern with the Lower Courts third assertion that the new anti-camping regulations are constitutional the Appeals Court wrote and summarized their ruling:

In sum, the Park Service has failed to demonstrate that the government's interests will be furthered by keeping these putative protestors from the sleeping activity which is the sole point in dispute. We reverse, therefore, because the indiscriminate line the government seeks to draw against sleeping cannot pass first amendment muster. Accordingly, we grant CCNV the injunctive relief it seeks, enjoining the Park Service from prohibiting sleep at CCNV's demonstration.

The ruling was subsequently challenged and taken to the Supreme Court.

== Opinion of the Court ==
The Supreme Court issued its decision on June 29, 1984, and in a 7-2 majority vote in favor of the National Park Service, it held that the regulations did not violate the First Amendment. The Court stressed that expression is subject to reasonable time, place, and manner restrictions, also that the means of the protest went against the government's interest in maintaining the condition of the national parks. The Court felt that the protest was not being threatened altogether and that it could take place in a park where sleeping was permitted. In essence because the demonstrators could find alternative ways of voicing their message their First Amendment right was safe. The regulation in question is also considered to be content neutral meaning the regulation did not have a bias against a particular message.

Supreme Court Holding, Clark v. C.C.N.V.
(a) Assuming that overnight sleeping in connection with the demonstration is expressive conduct protected to some extent by the First Amendment, the regulation forbidding sleeping meets the requirements for a reasonable time, place, or manner restriction of expression, whether oral, written, or symbolized by conduct. The regulation is neutral with regard to the message presented, and leaves open ample alternative methods of communicating the intended message concerning the plight of the homeless. Moreover, the regulation narrowly focuses on the Government's substantial interest in maintaining the parks in the heart of the Capital in an attractive and intact condition, readily available to the millions of people who wish to see and enjoy them by their presence. To permit camping would be totally inimical to these purposes. The validity of the regulation need not be judged solely by reference to the demonstration at hand, and none of its provisions are unrelated to the ends that it was designed to serve.
(b) Similarly, the challenged regulation is also sustainable as meeting the standards for a valid regulation of expressive conduct. Aside from its impact on speech, a rule against camping or overnight sleeping in public parks is not beyond the constitutional power of the Government to enforce. And as noted above, there is a substantial Government interest, unrelated to suppression of expression, in conserving park property that is served by the proscription of sleeping.

=== Majority opinion ===
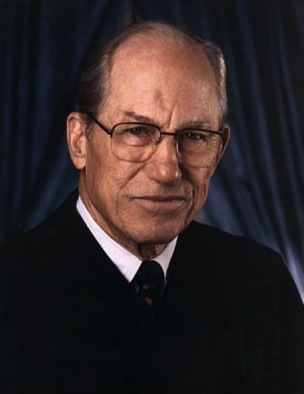
Justice Byron White authored the majority opinion for Clark v. C.C.N.V.

Justice Byron White wrote the majority opinion. He addressed the important topic of neutrality of the regulation by stating

The requirement that the regulation be content-neutral is clearly satisfied. The courts below accepted that view, and it is not disputed here that the prohibition on camping, and on sleeping specifically, is content-neutral and is not being applied because of disagreement with the message presented. Neither was the regulation faulted, nor could it be, on the ground that without overnight sleeping the plight of the homeless could not be communicated in other ways. The regulation otherwise left the demonstration intact, with its symbolic city, signs, and the presence of those who were willing to take their turns in a day-and-night vigil. Respondents do not suggest that there was, or is, any barrier to delivering to the media, or to the public by other means, the intended message concerning the plight of the homeless.

He noted that symbolic expression is subject to reasonable time, place, and manner restrictions.[2] Justice White also makes mention of how important the O'Brien Test was in deciding this case. The O'Brien Test being a tool of the court established in United States v. O'Brien, that determines whether governmental regulation involving symbolic speech can be justified. The restrictions of time, place, and manner can be allowed if they are (a) narrowly tailored (b) serve a substantial governmental interest and (c) there are alternative channels to communicate the information.

Contrary to the conclusion of the Court of Appeals, the foregoing analysis demonstrates that the Park Service regulation is sustainable under the four-factor standard of United States v. O'Brien, 391 U.S. 367 (1968), for validating a regulation of expressive conduct, which, in the last analysis is little, if any, different from the standard applied to time, place, or manner restrictions.

Justice White also makes clear that in the view of the majority the act of sleeping holds little value in being considered an act of expression.

In the first place, we seriously doubt that the First Amendment requires the Park Service to permit a demonstration in Lafayette Park and the Mall involving a 24-hour vigil and the erection of tents to accommodate 150 people. Furthermore, although we have assumed for present purposes that the sleeping banned in this case would have an expressive element, it is evident that its major value to this demonstration would be facilitative.

=== Concurrence ===
Chief Justice Warren E. Burger delivered a short concurring opinion that he begins by discussing the language of the case "could hardly be plainer in informing the public that camping in Lafayette Park was prohibited." He states that purported demonstration was conduct, "the actions here claimed as speech entitled to the protections of the First Amendment simply are not speech; rather, they constitute conduct." Chief Justice Burger expressed that the demonstrators actions "interferes with the rights of others to use Lafayette Park" and could take their message somewhere else. He also called the entire hearings "frivolous proceedings" that "delay the causes of litigants who have legitimate, nonfrivolous claims."

=== Dissenting opinion ===
Justice Thurgood Marshall delivered a dissenting opinion in which he stated his opinion but also criticized the way in which the majority handled the case. Justice Marshall also felt that the majority was "either unwilling or unable to take seriously the First Amendment claims advanced by respondents". He took issue with the way in which the majority "misapplies the test for ascertaining whether a restraint on speech qualifies as a reasonable time, place, and manner regulation". Justice Marshall wrote a detailed case for saying that the sleeping aspect of the demonstration, while overlooked by the majority, was a central part for the homeless cause.

It is true that we all go to sleep as part of our daily regimen and that, for the most part, sleep represents a physical necessity and not a vehicle for expression. But these characteristics need not prevent an activity that is normally devoid of expressive purpose from being used as a novel mode of communication. Sitting or standing in a library is a common-place activity necessary to facilitate ends usually having nothing to do with making a statement. Moreover, sitting or standing is not conduct that an observer would normally construe as expressive conduct. However, for Negroes to stand or sit in a "whites only" library in Louisiana in 1965 was powerfully expressive; in that particular context, those acts became "monuments of protest" against segregation.

Justice Marshall agreed with the O'Brien Test being applicable in this case but found fault in how it was explored. He explains that in terms of government interest "the issue is whether any substantial Government interest is served by banning sleep that is part of a political demonstration". Justice Marshall's dissent holds a stark contrast to the majority and concurring opinions. Much of his statement makes it clear he believed the demonstrators' request to have the right to sleep was a genuine freedom of expression concern.
