= Loudermill right =

In employment law, a public sector employee has a Loudermill right, which may refer to:

- Cleveland Bd. of Educ. v. Loudermill, the decision by the United States Supreme Court establishing the scope of the employee's right to a hearing
- Loudermill letter, the first step in providing notice of termination
- Loudermill hearing, the required pretermination hearing that must be disclosed in the Loudermill letter.
