= Arnett v. Kennedy =

1974 U.S. Supreme Court case

- Supreme Court of the United States

Argued November 7, 1973 Decided April 16, 1974
- Full case name: Arnett, Director, Office of Economic Opportunity, et al. v. Kennedy, et al.
- Docket no.: 72-1118
- Citations: 416 U.S. 134 (more) 94 S.Ct. 1633; 40 L.Ed.2d 15; 1974 U.S. LEXIS 125
- Argument: Oral argument

Case history
- Prior: Summary judgement for plaintiff, sub nom Kennedy v. Sanchez, 349 F. Supp. 863 (N.D. Ill. 1972)

Holding
- Post-termination procedures provided by federal agency adequately protected appellee's liberty interests and pretermination hearing was not constitutionally necessary; statute under which employee was fired neither impermissibly vague or overbroad to justify dismissal for speech alleging superior was accepting bribes. Northern District of Illinois reversed.

Court membership
- Chief Justice Warren E. Burger Associate Justices William O. Douglas · William J. Brennan Jr. Potter Stewart · Byron White; Thurgood Marshall · Harry Blackmun; Lewis F. Powell Jr. · William Rehnquist

Case opinions
- Plurality: Rehnquist, joined by Burger, Stewart
- Concurrence: Powell, joined by Blackmun
- Concur/dissent: White
- Dissent: Douglas
- Dissent: Marshall, joined by Douglas, Brennan

Laws applied
- Lloyd–La Follette Act, U.S. Const. amend. I, U.S. Const. amend. XIV
- Overruled by
- Cleveland Board of Education v. Loudermill

Arnett v. Kennedy, 416 U.S. 134 (1974), was a United States Supreme Court case in which the Court rejected a nonprobationary federal civil service employee's claim to a full hearing prior to dismissal over charges he had brought the government into disrepute by recklessly accusing a superior of corruption. The governing federal law prescribed not only grounds for removal but also removal procedures. The employee could only be removed for "cause," but the procedures did not provide for an adversarial hearing prior to termination. The Court also rejected the respondent's claim that his First Amendment rights were violated.

The 6–3 decision was widely criticized by legal scholars for Justice William Rehnquist's controversial conceptualization of Kennedy's due process rights in his plurality opinion, joined by only two other justices and explicitly rejected by the others. Rehnquist reasoned that since the state creates property interests such as that Arnett held in his job through its statutes, any procedures the state creates to allow an employee to appeal a termination are thus sufficient to constitute due process. Thus, he wrote, those with such interests "must take the bitter with the sweet".

Justices Byron White and Thurgood Marshall disapprovingly quoted that line in their separate opinions (White concurring that Kennedy's First Amendment rights had not been violated but dissenting from the rest of the holding, while Marshall dissented entirely, joined by two other justices). Justice Lewis Powell, concurring with another justice, also rejected Rehnquist's theory. A later case, Logan v. Zimmerman Brush Co., held differently without explicitly overruling Arnett; in 1985's Cleveland Board of Education v. Loudermill, the Court held that public employees are entitled to some form of hearing before dismissal and formally rejected his "bitter with the sweet" formulation, with Rehnquist (by then Chief Justice) as the only dissenter. Some legal scholars have argued it should have been retained, or that the Court's subsequent disinterest in engaging this question has been to the detriment of its jurisprudence.

The First Amendment aspect of the holding—that the FFLA's provisions that covered employees could only be dismissed for "such cause as will promote the efficiency of the service" was neither overbroad nor so vague that employees lacked notice that speech such as Arnett's could lead to discipline—remains, although it has not been relied on much. After the case was remanded to the district court, Kennedy was again fired. He appealed that to the federal Civil Service Commission and was reinstated with back pay within a year.

== Underlying dispute ==
Wayne Kennedy, who had begun his career in federal employment with the Internal Revenue Service in 1964, transferred to the Office of Economic Opportunity (OEO), which administered many of the federal grant programs created under the Johnson Administration's Great Society agenda, four years later. He began as a field representative in Chicago and was promoted to branch manager for Indiana. He was also head of the national council of OEO locals for the American Federation of Government Employees. His position as field representative was characterized as "fairly important", since it primarily entailed representing the agency's positions to the Community Action Agencies it gave grants to. He was a GS-12 on the federal civilian employee pay scale, earning $16,000 ($93,000 in modern dollars).

In 1971 Kennedy was suspended for 60 days after having, nearly a year earlier, advised members of a group that OEO had given money to that they should replace their board of directors completely. This violated OEO policy that its field representatives were not to in any way involve themselves in the internal affairs of the community groups the agency worked with. Johnson had already, according to the government, been warned about this after a previous incident; of several charges brought against him, this was the only one that was sustained after he wrote a lengthy written rebuttal.

In April 1972, three weeks after he had been informed of the suspension, further charges were brought against Kennedy, based on allegations he had accused the regional director of violating treaties in his dealings with some Native groups, and that another OEO official had violated the agency's conflict of interest standards by entering into a contract with an insurance agency her husband had an interest in. After he had received that notice, he then claimed at a union meeting that his superior had offered a $100,000 grant to a tribal official if that person would submit a written statement against Kennedy and another employee active in the union. These claims were reported in a newspaper article; Kennedy also held a press conference, with other union leaders, in the lobby of the building that housed OEO's headquarters where he made the same allegations and passed out copies of documents purporting to support those allegations.

Additional charges were brought against Kennedy. He was, per agency policy, again offered the chance to respond to them within 30 days either verbally or in writing. His entire response was to demand an adversarial hearing, and said the disciplinary proceedings in this instance violated his First Amendment right to free speech. Accordingly, OEO notified him that pursuant to the Lloyd-La Follette Act (LLFA), passed during Progressive Era civil service reform, he was fired.

Under regulations promulgated by the Civil Service Commission (CSC) and the OEO on how he could reply to the charges and appeal any subsequent dismissal, Kennedy appealed to the CSC and filed suit in federal court for the Northern District of Illinois claiming that the discharge procedures authorized by the Act had denied him and others due process of law since it did not allow for an adversarial hearing prior to termination, naming then-OEO director Philip Sanchez as defendant.

== District court ==
Judge Richard Wellington McLaren stayed the case while Kennedy's CSC appeal was pending. After his CSC appeal was denied, Kennedy added to his suit a claim that his First Amendment right to free speech had been violated, since the FFLA's language was so vague and overbroad as to make it impossible to ascertain what speech might lead to disciplinary proceedings.

McLaren convened a three-judge panel, with Seventh Circuit Court of Appeals judge Walter J. Cummings Jr. and fellow district judge Philip Willis Tone, to hear it. Both Kennedy and the government submitted their evidence, made their arguments and moved for summary judgement in their favor. In October, the panel held for Kennedy.

The government had relied on Cafeteria & Restaurant Workers Union, Local 473 v. McElroy, in which the dismissal of a cook employed at a private concession stand on a naval facility after issues came out that led to the revocation of her security clearance, to support its argument that it could summarily dismiss employees. McLaren responded that "[t]he continuing vitality of this rule is seriously in question today owing to recent Supreme Court decisions in the due process area". In that particular case, he conceded, the national security interest may have allowed such decisive action, but it was not a factor in the instant case, and given that other federal agencies allowed their employees similar hearings it was unconstitutional for OEO not to.

McLaren agreed with Kennedy on the First Amendment claim as well. The language of the FFLA, that employees could only be disciplined for "such cause as will promote the efficiency of the service" was in his opinion so broad that "there can be little question that [OEO employees] will be deterred from exercising their First Amendment rights to the fullest extent." He allowed that OEO certainly could regulate its employees' speech, but at the same time enjoined the agency from enforcing any rules against speech under the FFLA's current construction.

The OEO was ordered to reinstate Kennedy and grant him full back pay, which it did. The government appealed the case directly to the Supreme Court, bypassing the Seventh Circuit. Since Alvin Arnett had taken over as OEO director by that time, his name was substituted for Sanchez's as the petitioner.

== Oral argument ==
The Court heard oral argument in the case in November 1973. Daniel Mortimer Friedman, later to serve as a federal judge on the Court of Claims and Federal Circuit, argued for the government; Charles Barnhill argued for Kennedy. The National Association of Letter Carriers filed an amicus curiae brief urging affirmance.

Friedman spent most of his argument outlining the facts of the case and clarifying the procedures involved for the justices. Thurgood Marshall was particularly concerned by the absence of any requirement for a pretermination hearing. He asked if, were an employee to show up to work drunk, the government could fire him simply by writing him a letter. Friedman admitted that it was possible but that was not how things were done. "I know, but if you are wrong on this, you are in a little bit of trouble, aren't you?" Marshall responded; Friedman agreed.

Barnhill began by noting that since Kennedy had been reinstated, he had received positive evaluations and gotten another raise; the 60-day suspension had also been reversed, with back pay. Justice William Rehnquist asked him a question he had tried to get Friedman to answer: since the district court's grant of summary judgement required accepting all the facts the government had pleaded as true, did Kennedy accept them as such? Barnhill replied that since the adversarial hearing his client wanted had not yet been held, he considered the alleged misconduct to be merely charges, not facts, and thus irrelevant.

Later the justices questioned him closely on the argument that Kennedy had a property interest in his job, per Board of Regents v. Roth and Perry v. Sindermann, two other recent precedents which had also involved public employees who alleged due process violations during dismissal procedures they claimed were motivated by speech critical of their superiors. Barnhill said those cases required a hearing prior to Kennedy's termination, a provision Friedman had told the Court was in the regulations of eight other federal agencies at that time. "[I]t seems to me that the purpose of the Lloyd-La Follette Act was to protect government employees from being fired arbitrarily", Barnhill said. "If the procedure ... does not assure that an employee will not be fired for cause then the procedure is defective."

"I think the government's argument is very dangerous", Barnhill continued. "[T]here is no question that states and municipalities may take property ... and if the legislature were allowed to condition the taking of this kind of property on the basis of inadequate procedural safeguards, and that somehow composed a right of those persons, any property could be taken without due process." He added that 24 percent of dismissed employees are subsequently reinstated, arguing that proved the system did not adequately protect against wrongful terminations. "The government has no interest in this system as it stands now."

Lastly Barnhill addressed the First Amendment claim. He pointed to previous lower court cases which had similarly found the CSC regulations overly broad and vague and called on the Commission to rewrite them. "The Administrative Conference of the United States (ACUS) has termed it an open invitation to arbitrary action." Friedman, given time to make a rebuttal argument, pointed to the regulation that forbade OEO employees from any action "affecting adversely the confidence of the public in the integrity of OEO and the government."

== Opinion of the Court ==
In April 1974, the Supreme Court reversed. Six of the Justices found that the LLFA had created an expectancy of job retention requiring procedural protection under the Due Process Clause. Five of the Justices then concluded that the procedure given the plaintiff satisfied the requirements of due process. Furthermore, the Court concluded that post-termination procedures provided by the Commission and the OEO adequately protected appellee's liberty interest in not being wrongfully stigmatized by untrue administrative charges. Finally, the Court held the Lloyd-La Follette Act was not impermissibly vague or overbroad in its regulation of federal employee speech. Three justices dissented.

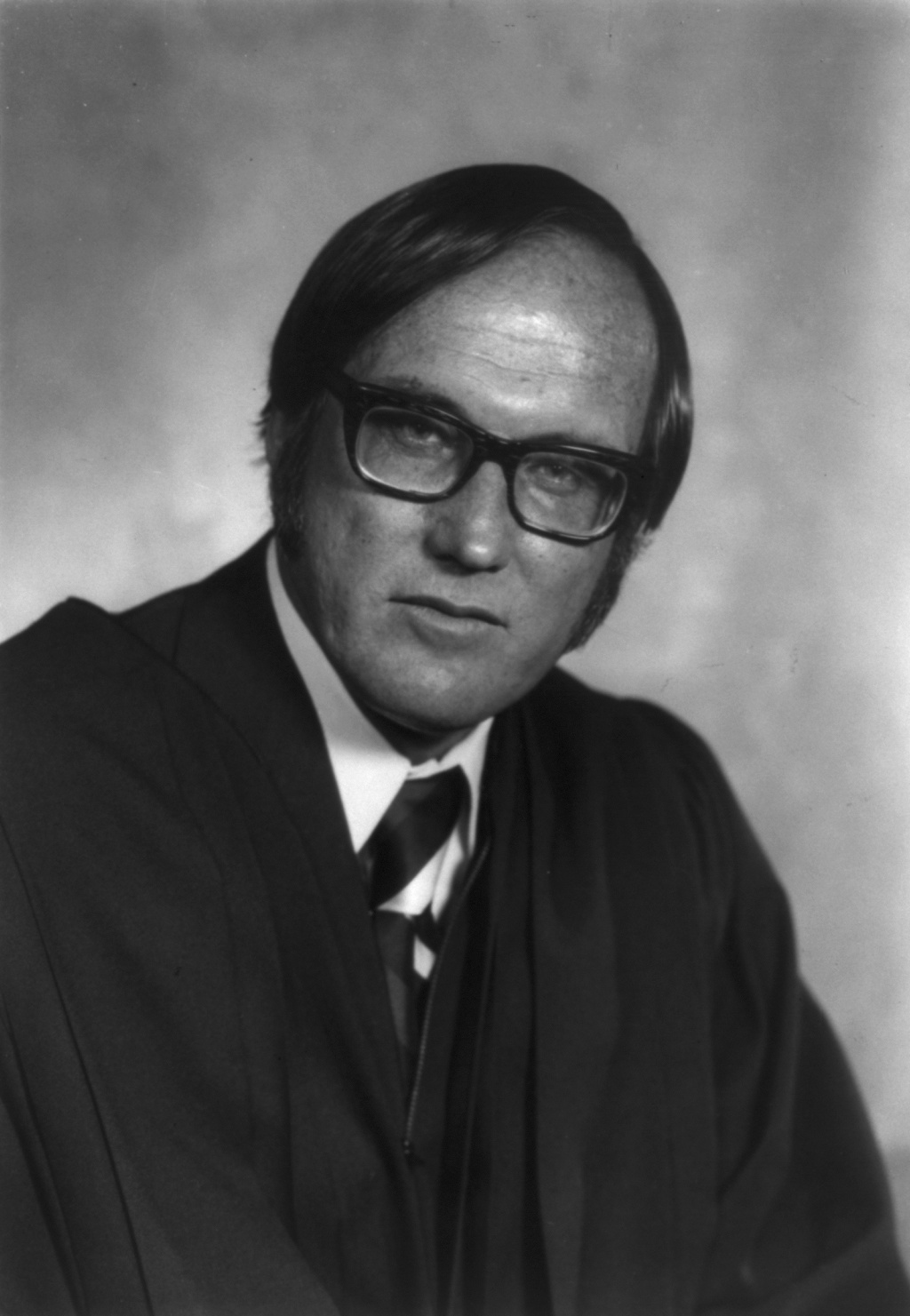
Justice William Rehnquist in the early 1970s

Rehnquist, joined by Chief Justice Warren Burger and Potter Stewart, wrote the plurality opinion. After recounting the history of the case and the federal civil service laws, he concluded that since the same statutory provision that had provided that covered employees could only be removed from their jobs for "such cause as will promote the efficiency of the service" also explicitly described removal procedures that did not include an adversary hearing, Kennedy had no right to one.

Congress was obviously intent on according a measure of statutory job security to governmental employees which they had not previously enjoyed, but was likewise intent on excluding more elaborate procedural requirements which it felt would make the operation of the new scheme unnecessarily burdensome in practice. Where the focus of legislation was thus strongly on the procedural mechanism for enforcing the substantive right which was simultaneously conferred, we decline to conclude that the substantive right may be viewed wholly apart from the procedure provided for its enforcement. The employee's statutorily defined right is not a guarantee against removal without cause in the abstract, but such a guarantee as enforced by the procedures which Congress has designated for the determination of cause.

In the 1947 case Fahey v. Mallonee, Rehnquist continued, the Court had "viewed skeptically the action of a litigant in challenging the constitutionality of portions of a statute under which it has simultaneously claimed benefits." He proclaimed that it was past time for the Court to start applying that consistently. "[W]here the grant of a substantive right is inextricably intertwined with the limitations on the procedures which are to be employed in determining that right," Rehnquist wrote, "a litigant in the position of appellee must take the bitter with the sweet ... the property interest which appellee had in his employment was itself conditioned by the procedural limitations which had accompanied the grant of that interest."

Post-termination proceedings, Rehnquist further held, would afford Kennedy an ample opportunity to clear his reputation from the charges. He also found the economic effect of the minimum three-month delay that Kennedy argued was likely in such an event not to reach the level of a due process violation, either. "We assume that some delay attends vindication of an employee's reputation throughout the hearing procedures provided on appeal, and conclude that at least the delays cited here do not entail any separate deprivation of a liberty interest."

Rehnquist further rejected Kennedy's contention, supported by the district court, that "such cause as will promote the efficiency of the service" was so vague as to be unconstitutional. "We do not believe that Congress was confined to the choice of enacting a detailed code of employee conduct, or else granting no job protection at all", he wrote. "[T]he language ... was not written upon a clean slate in 1912, and it does not appear on a clean slate now", as the Civil Service Commission had issued considerable guidance on how to apply it since then. Nor was it so overbroad as to preclude dismissals over employee speech.

Congress when it enacted the Lloyd-La Follette Act did so with the intention of conferring job protection rights on federal employees which they had not previously had, it obviously did not intend to authorize discharge under the Act's removal standard for speech which is constitutionally protected. The Act proscribes only that public speech which improperly damages and impairs the reputation and efficiency of the employing agency, and it thus imposes no greater controls on the behavior of federal employees than are necessary for the protection of the Government as an employer. Indeed the Act is not directed at speech as such, but at employee behavior, including speech, which is detrimental to the efficiency of the employing agency.

=== Powell concurrence ===
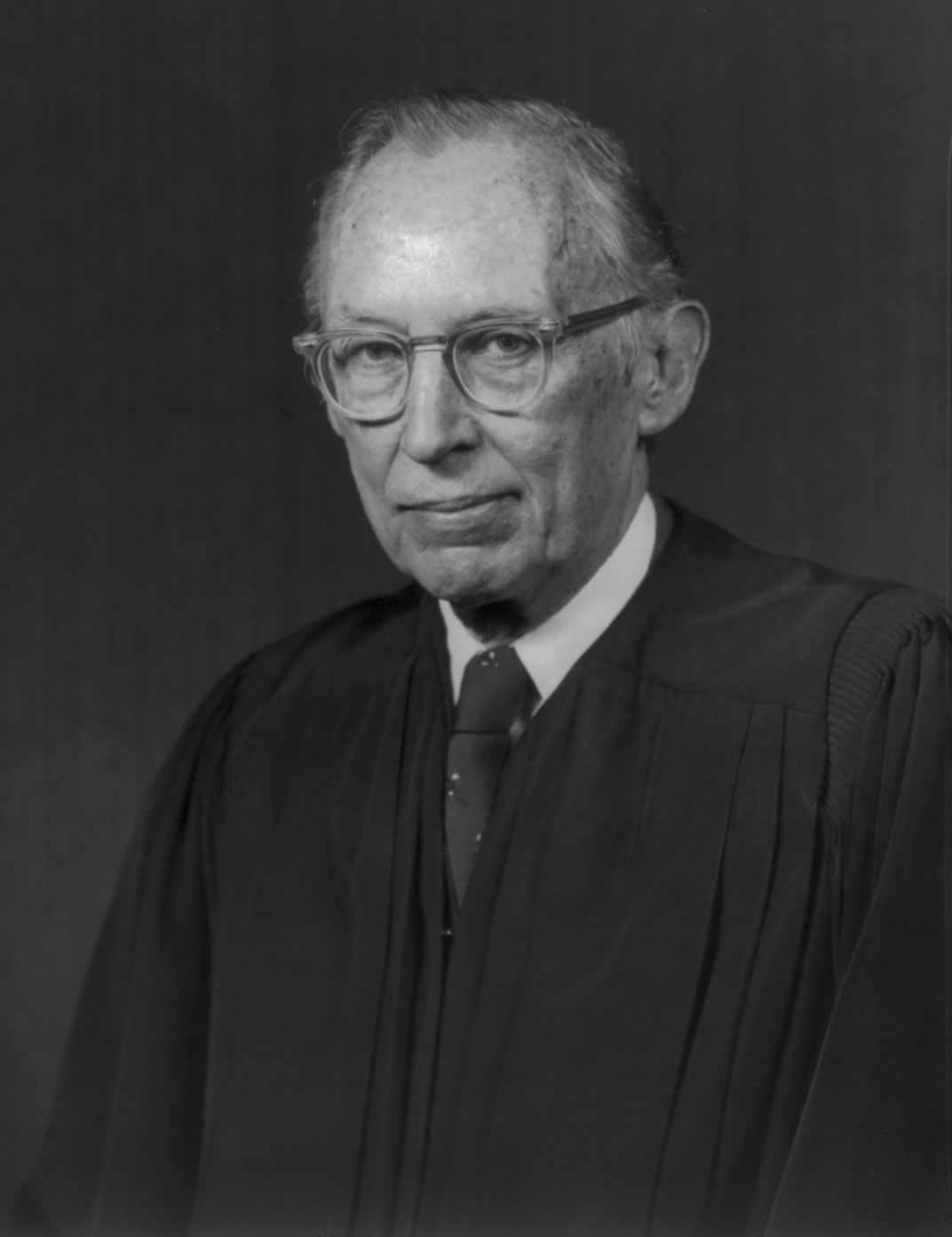
Justice Lewis Powell in 1976, two years after Arnett

Justice Lewis Powell concurred in a separate opinion, joined by Justice Harry Blackmun. At the outset, he indicated his agreement with the plurality holding that the statute was neither vague nor overbroad. He also agreed that Kennedy's due process rights had not been violated, but on different grounds than the plurality.

In Roth and Perry, Powell reminded the plurality, the protected property interest both plaintiffs had been found to have in their continued public employment entitled them to constitutional due process protections. He did not find that reflected in Rehnquist's opinion. "The plurality opinion evidently reasons that the nature of appellee's interest in continued federal employment is necessarily defined and limited by the statutory procedures for discharge and that the constitutional guarantee of procedural due process accords to appellee no procedural protections against arbitrary or erroneous discharge other than those expressly provided in the statute", Powell wrote. "The plurality would thus conclude that the statute governing federal employment determines not only the nature of appellee's property interest, but also the extent of the procedural protections to which he may lay claim", a conclusion he said was at odds with Roth and Perry.

Indeed, it would lead directly to the conclusion that whatever the nature of an individual's statutorily created property interest, deprivation of that interest could be accomplished without notice or a hearing at any time. This view misconceives the origin of the right to procedural due process. That right is conferred, not by legislative grace, but by constitutional guarantee.

Powell found that that standard had been met. Kennedy's due-process interest, balanced against the government's in maintaining an efficient workforce, did not justify a pretermination hearing. "Prolonged retention of a disruptive or otherwise unsatisfactory employee can adversely affect discipline and morale in the work place, foster disharmony, and ultimately impair the efficiency of an office or agency. Moreover, a requirement of a prior evidentiary hearing would impose additional administrative costs, create delay, and deter warranted discharges."

As the plurality had, Powell dismissed Kennedy's claims of economic harm. Kennedy had pointed to another recent case, Goldberg v. Kelly, where the lack of a hearing prior to the cutoff of welfare benefits had been held unconstitutional. Powell distinguished the cases, noting that Goldberg had involved welfare recipients with no other means of support likely, whereas in the instant case "a public employee may well have independent resources to overcome any temporary hardship, and he may be able to secure a job in the private sector. Alternatively, he will be eligible for welfare benefits."

Lastly Powell dispensed with Kennedy's argument that the absence of a pretermination hearing increased the risk of wrongful dismissals. He noted that the existing procedures required 30 days notice prior to termination and that the employee be provided with the documentation supporting the termination as well as an opportunity to respond both verbally and in writing. "These procedures minimize the risk of error in the initial removal decision and provide for compensation for the affected employee should that decision eventually prove wrongful."

== White opinion ==
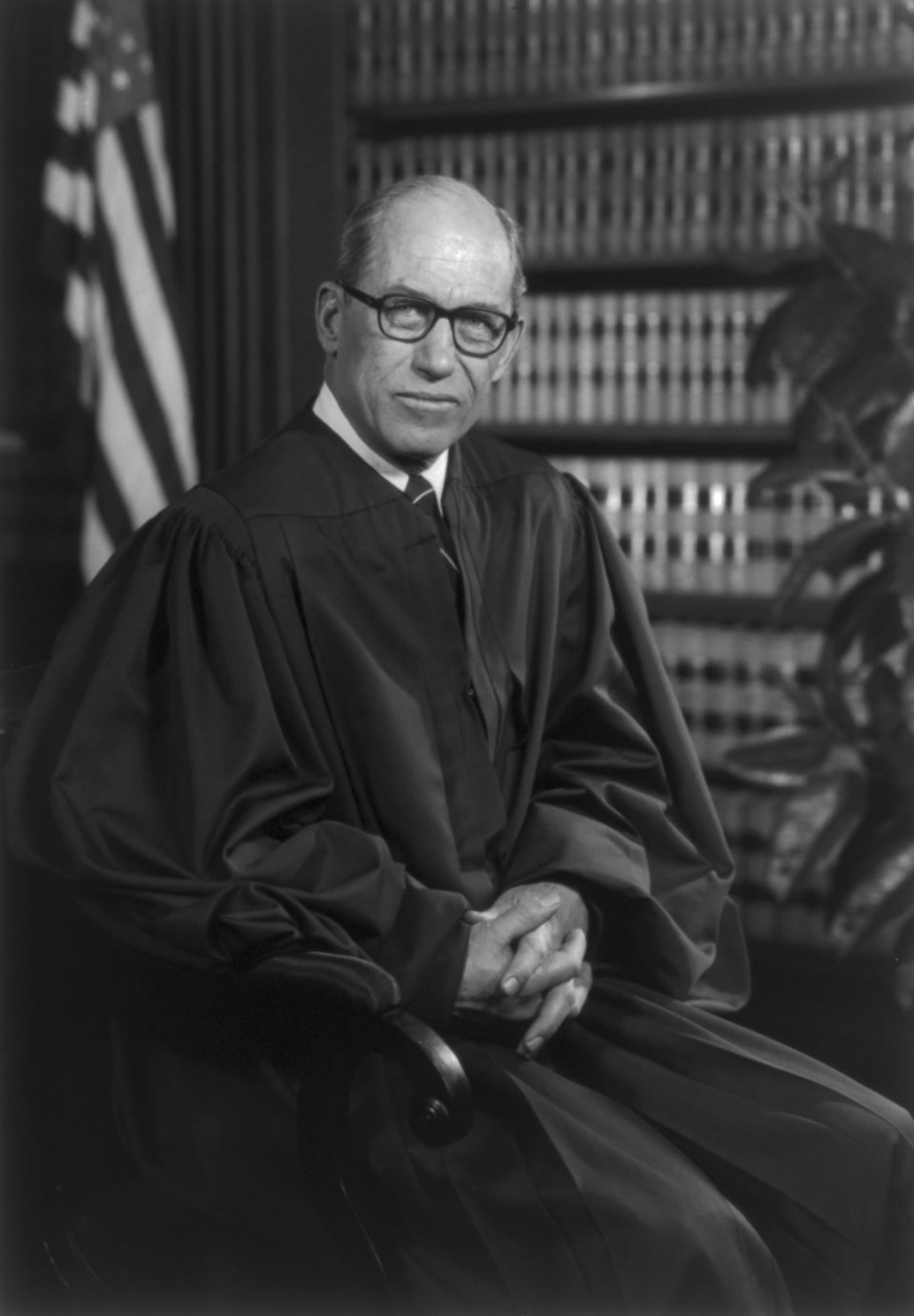
Justice White, in 1976

Justice Byron White wrote a lengthy opinion concurring in part and dissenting in part. He broke the case down to three questions:

First, does the Due Process Clause require that there be a full trial-type hearing at some time when a Federal Government employee in the competitive service is terminated? Secondly, if such be the case, must this hearing be held prior to the discharge of the employee, and, if so, was the process afforded in this case adequate? Third, and as an entirely separate matter, are the Lloyd-La Follette Act and its attendant regulations void for vagueness or overbreadth?

He answered the last first, saying he concurred with the plurality and Powell. But as to the others, he began, "I differ basically" with Rehnquist's "bitter with the sweet" formulation. "The rationale of this position quickly leads to the conclusion that even though the statute requires cause for discharge, the requisites of due process could equally have been satisfied had the law dispensed with any hearing at all, whether pretermination or post-termination."

White then began a long review of the Court's case law on due process, going as far back as Dent v. West Virginia, a medical-licensing case from 1889. All of them supported the need for a hearing at some point to satisfy the demands of due process. He then asked if, as the plurality seemed to believe, there was "something different about a final taking from an individual of property rights which have their origin in the public rather than the private sector of the economy".

This led to another review of cases specific to public employment. To White, they, too, indicated a requirement for some process: "These cases only serve to emphasize that where there is a legitimate entitlement to a job, as when a person is given employment subject to his meeting certain specific conditions, due process requires, in order to insure against arbitrariness by the State in the administration of its law, that a person be given notice and a hearing before he is finally discharged."

Then White turned to whether this hearing had to be held prior to termination. In recent cases such as Goldberg and Bell v. Burson, where a driver's license suspension was challenged, the Court had required a predeprivation hearing. But older cases held to the contrary. White distinguished some cases, such as Fahey and North American Cold Storage Co. v. City of Chicago, due to the exigent circumstances that required the government not wait till a hearing to take constructive possession of property. Like Powell, he weighed the competing interests, largely agreeing but noting that if a former employee were forced onto the welfare rolls it would be "a partially counter-productive policy" for the government. White, too, concluded the existing procedures were constitutional.

For White, the real problem with the hearing was that it was not impartial. Kennedy's supervisor, who had in his notice terminating him effectively accused him of defamation, may have performed his duties at the hearing impartially, but the appearance to the contrary could not be avoided. White said he would have affirmed the district court's decision regarding Kennedy's job but reversed it on the First Amendment claim.

== Dissenting opinions ==
The three dissenting justices wrote two opinions. William O. Douglas, nearing the end of his long tenure on the Court, wrote a dissent focusing on the free speech issues. He also joined, along with William Brennan, a longer and broader dissent by Marshall.

=== Douglas ===
"The federal bureaucracy controls a vast conglomerate of people who walk more and more submissively to the dictates of their superiors", Douglas began. The previous year, he had dissented when the Court, in United States Civil Service Commission v. National Ass'n of Letter Carriers held that the Hatch Act's ban on active participation in political campaigns by federal employees was constitutional. "Today's decision deprives them of other important First Amendment rights."

Douglas reminded his colleagues that, in Pickering v. Board of Education, where the Court had first held that the First Amendment extends to speech by public employees, they had found the petitioner teacher's free-speech interest on a matter of public concern more important than the injury to reputation the school board had claimed to justify dismissing him. Although there it had declined to extend its holding to cases involving speech that adversely reflected on immediate superiors or affected relations among coworkers, Douglas said that was "irrelevant" here as the speech was on a matter of public concern. The Court, by siding with the OEO, had allowed "Peter's Inversion", from the popular management book The Peter Principle, under which employees are rewarded by their superiors for loyalty and submissiveness to the organization over the actual goal of their work, to take hold in the federal government. "It is, of course, none of a court's problem what the employment policies may be", Douglas wrote. "But once an employee speaks out on a public issue and is punished for it, we have a justiciable issue."

=== Marshall ===
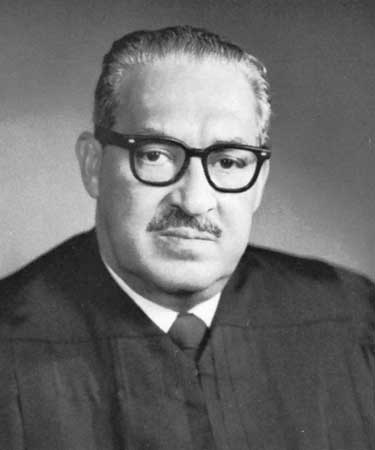
Justice Marshall in the 1970s

Justice Marshall's dissent addressed every issue. He first considered the hearing question. "We are hardly writing on a clean slate in this area", he observed, citing not just Roth and Perry but other recent cases where the Court had held an adversary hearing was a necessary prerequisite of the adverse government action. Marshall characterized Rehnquist's "bitter with the sweet" as a "wry" phrase, but took exception to the concept, noting that until Goldberg the same standard had been used to limit the due process rights of welfare recipients. Accepting it, as he noted the majority of the justices had not, "would amount to nothing less than a return, albeit in somewhat different verbal garb, to the thoroughly discredited distinction between rights and privileges which once seemed to govern the applicability of procedural due process."

Studies had shown that the stigma of being dismissed from a government job made it very difficult for those in that position to find equivalent private employment, especially when accompanied by allegations of misconduct. "Given the importance of the interest at stake, the discharged employee should be afforded an opportunity to test the strength of the evidence of his misconduct by confronting and cross-examining adverse witnesses and by presenting witnesses in his own behalf, whenever there are substantial disputes in testimonial evidence", Marshall wrote. Thus, as in Goldberg, the government's actions here posed the threat of interrupting the only income a recipient might have, even temporarily.

Many workers, particularly those at the bottom of the pay scale, will suffer severe and painful economic dislocations from even a temporary loss of wages. Few public employees earn more than enough to pay their expenses from month to month. Even aside from the stigma that attends a dismissal for cause, few employers will be willing to hire and train a new employee knowing that he will return to a former Government position as soon as an appeal is successful. And in many States, including Illinois, where appellee resides, a worker discharged for cause is not even eligible for unemployment compensation.

Kennedy had not been unaffected—despite his generous salary, he "was nonetheless driven to the brink of financial ruin while he waited. He had to borrow money to support his family, his debts went unpaid, his family lost the protection of his health insurance and, finally, he was forced to apply for public assistance."

Marshall responded harshly to Powell's suggestion that Kennedy need not worry because public assistance would be available:

To argue that a dismissal from tenured Government employment is not a serious enough deprivation to require a prior hearing because the discharged employee may draw on the welfare system in the interim, is to exhibit a gross insensitivity to the plight of these employees. First, it assumes that the discharged employee will be eligible for welfare. Often welfare applicants must be all but stripped of their worldly goods before being admitted to the welfare roles [sic], hence it is likely that the employee will suffer considerable hardship before becoming eligible. He may be required not only to exhaust his savings but also to convert many of his assets into cash for support before being able to fall back on public assistance. He may have to give up his home or cherished personal possessions in order to become eligible. The argument also assumes all but instant eligibility which is, sadly, far from likely even when all the employee's other sources of support have been depleted. Moreover, rightly or wrongly, many people consider welfare degrading and would decline public assistance even when eligible. Finally, the level of subsistence provided by welfare is minimal, certainly less than one is apt to expect from steady employment. The substitution of a meager welfare grant for a regular paycheck may bring with it painful and irremediable personal as well as financial dislocations. A child's education may be interrupted, a family's home lost, a person's relationship with his friends and even his family may be irrevocably affected. The costs of being forced, even temporarily, onto the welfare rolls because of a wrongful discharge from tenured Government employment cannot be so easily discounted.

Even the promise of future back pay could not ameliorate the economic setbacks of a sudden loss of pay. The Court, Marshall reminded his fellow justices, had understood as much in Sniadach v. Family Finance Corp. where it had held an employee facing garnishment of his wages was entitled to a hearing beforehand for that reason.

The Court had recognized situations such as Cold Storage and Fahee where a compelling governmental interest justified postponing the hearing until after the action, Marshall allowed. But he found neither of the government's cited interests here strong enough. "The applicable statute does not prohibit prior hearings but rather makes them discretionary with the agency", he noted, and ACUS had found that agencies that required pretermination hearings actually finished those proceedings, either way, more quickly. The 30-day period between notice of dismissal and the employee's last day was, to Marshall, more than enough time to schedule a hearing if desired. As to the second reason, the possibility of an employee facing termination becoming disruptive, "he could be put on administrative leave or temporarily assigned to a less sensitive position pending his hearing, as currently provided for by regulation."

Marshall then turned to the First Amendment question. "The 'efficiency of the service' standard would appear to bring within its reach, as permissible grounds for dismissal, even truthful criticism of an agency that in any way tends to disrupt its operation", he observed. "The majority purports to solve this potential overbreadth problem merely by announcing that the standard in the Act 'excludes protected speech' ... [But t]he Court's answer is no answer at all" for it misunderstood how the overbreadth doctrine is applied.

The focus of the doctrine is not on the individual actor before the court but on others who may forgo protected activity rather than run afoul of the statute's proscriptions ... That this Court will ultimately vindicate an employee if his speech is constitutionally protected is of little consequence—for the value of a sword of Damocles is that it hangs—not that it drops. For every employee who risks his job by testing the limits of the statute, many more will choose the cautious path and not speak at all.

== Aftermath ==
After the case was remanded to the district court, it voided its reinstatement order. OEO fired Kennedy again in October; he once again appealed to the CSC. In April 1975 the commission overturned the dismissal and again ordered him reinstated with back pay.

== Subsequent jurisprudence ==
Lower courts hearing cases in which other public employees had fought their terminations alleging due process violations found Arnett immediately dispositive of the previously unsettled hearing question. Judge Frank A. Kaufman of the District of Maryland relied on Arnett and its "divergent" opinions to deny a plaintiff back pay after having previously ordered the hearing that Arnett had held not required.

Other courts noted the difficulty of clearly interpreting the case and the necessity to read all the opinions to ascertain its holding. One of the first federal courts to consider it complained that "[u]nfortunately, no clear majority opinion emerged from this case and the five separate opinions served merely to obfuscate what had been until that time a relatively settled area of the law ... badly fragmenting whatever precedential value Arnett may have as a basis for a decision in the instant cases". The California Supreme Court, considering the case of a medical consultant challenging his dismissal over long lunch breaks in which he was seen at local bars drinking heavily, noted that "the court's full decision is embodied in five opinions which reveal varying points of view among the different justices" and after reviewing and citing all the opinions in the case along with other precedents concluded that Rehnquist's "bitter with the sweet" had been rejected by the other six justices. It applied the balancing tests they resorted to and held for the plaintiff. Judge Richard Cameron Freeman of the Northern District of Georgia similarly observed that while Arnett was seen as the "leading" case on the issue, "[i]n light of the fact that five separate opinions were filed ... the rationale in that case is by no means clear."

The Court's own Mathews v. Eldridge decision, two years after Arnett, in which Powell's majority opinion had used a balancing test similar to that concurrence to conclude that the respondent was not entitled to a hearing before his disability benefits were terminated, led other courts to favor that approach over the plurality opinion's. In a case where he and his colleagues had unanimously held for a dismissed psychiatric aide at a state hospital, Justice Kenneth J. O'Connell of the Oregon Supreme Court took exception to Powell's contention that requiring pretermination hearings could increase administrative costs and drag disciplinary processes out, given that the ACUS study referred to by Barnhill at oral argument showed that the opposite was true. "In fact," he wrote, "a pre-termination hearing should enhance efficiency by giving the agency an incentive to expedite disposition of the matter, allowing it to get on with its primary functions." At the D.C. Circuit, Judge Roger Robb dissented in a case where the court had ordered the petitioner be granted a hearing on his dismissal from both his positions as an Air Force civilian employee and reserve officer, noting that Arnett did not apply to the military.

By 1982, that was effectively settled law. Future Supreme Court justice Anthony Kennedy, then on the Ninth Circuit, observed that recent cases had shown a "strong presumption that a public employee is entitled to some form of notice and opportunity to be heard before being deprived of a property or liberty interest" and in a footnote rebuked the lower court that had relied on the Arnett plurality in upholding the teacher's dismissal in the instant case. "Although there were several separate opinions filed in Arnett v. Kennedy", the Idaho Supreme Court similarly observed the next year in upholding the dismissal of a state college security chief fired for racially tinged remarks to a newspaper, "the United States Supreme Court and the lower federal courts have consistently followed the reasoning of the separate opinion written by Justice Powell", wrote Justice Stephen Bistline.

Not all the lower courts considered it as precedent on the procedural questions. In 1980 An en banc Fifth Circuit divided sharply in Davis v. Williams on whether Arnett's holding that the Pendleton Act's "for such cause as will promote the efficiency of the service" was not impermissibly vague or overbroad applied as well to the similar catchall "making derogatory statements or adversely criticizing department policy, activities, or officers" under which the petitioner had been fired for making remarks critical of a town fire chief in the local newspaper. "[I]ronically, these catch-all provisions, so often attacked on vagueness (due process) and overbreadth (first amendment) grounds", observed Judge Thomas Gibbs Gee, writing for the majority, "probably give the only notice that can practically and effectively be given that the employer thinks itself entitled to impose punishment on grounds that are not set out with particularity." He pointed to Arnett and Parker v. Levy, where the Court had upheld an Air Force physician's criminal conviction at court martial for making remarks urging disobedience of any orders to participate in the Vietnam War, as guiding authorities.

Judge Alvin Benjamin Rubin, in dissent, responded that while such a general edit might constitutionally cover a conduct, it could not so cover speech. The fire department was not, as the majority admitted, a military unit so Parker could not be so readily applied, and he distinguished Arnett by noting that the Pendleton Act's language was supported by longstanding guidance from the CSC and other agencies. "None of these buttresses supports this ordinance", Rubin wrote. "There is no state court interpretation that safeguards constitutionally protected speech, there is no counsel to advise on the ordinance and there is no administrative history."

=== Later Supreme Court cases ===
The differences of opinions among the justices continued as they heard similar cases in the years after Arnett. In Goss v. Lopez, where a 5-4 majority upheld a district court's finding that several Ohio high school students had been unconstitutionally suspended without a prior hearing, Justice White, writing for the majority, invoked his Arnett opinion. But Powell, whose opinion he had also cited, appeared to embrace the plurality theory when writing for the dissenters: "[T]he very legislation which 'defines' the 'dimension' of the student's entitlement, while providing a right to education generally, does not establish this right free of discipline imposed in accord with Ohio law. Rather, the right is encompassed in the entire package of statutory provisions governing education in Ohio—of which the power to suspend is one."

In 1976's Bishop v. Wood, the Court upheld the firing of a North Carolina police officer who claimed the grounds for his dismissal were fallacious. "A property interest in employment can, of course, be created by ordinance, or by an implied contract", Justice John Paul Stevens, who had replaced Douglas, wrote for a 5-4 majority that affirmed the Arnett plurality. "In either case, however, the sufficiency of the claim of entitlement must be decided by reference to state law." Since the North Carolina Supreme Court had previously decided that a public employee had a right to expect continued employment only if the employer explicitly guaranteed it, and although Bishop had been classified as a permanent employee there was no explicit guarantee, he had no property interest to assert due process over.

Justices Brennan, White and Blackmun wrote separate dissents, joined by combinations of the other dissenting justices. The first called the majority's reading of the municipal ordinance that Bishop had based his property claim on "strained" and said the Court should have considered whether it was objectively reasonable for him to have expected continued employment before it decided whether there was a property interest. White, saying "the decision of the majority rests upon a proposition which was squarely addressed and in my view correctly rejected by six Members of this Court in Arnett", reiterated this at length, joined by all the other dissenters, quoting from Powell's Arnett concurrence as well as his and Marshall's dissents. "The ordinance plainly grants petitioner a right to his job unless there is cause to fire him", he wrote "Having granted him such a right it is the Federal Constitution, not state law, which determines the process to be applied in connection with any state decision to deprive him of it."

Two years later, the Court heard Memphis Light, Power & Gas Division v. Craft, the appeal of a public utility's proposal to interrupt service to a customer over a disputed portion of their bills. Craft and the other customers argued that they had a property interest in continued service and that was, as with the welfare payments in Goldberg, a basic enough necessity as to require the pretermination hearing the majority had found unnecessary in Arnett. Powell wrote for the majority this time, holding with the customers. "Although the underlying substantive interest is created by 'an independent source such as state law,' federal constitutional law determines whether that interest rises to the level of a 'legitimate claim of entitlement' protected by the Due Process Clause," he wrote. While Arnett is cited only twice in the case and not discussed, Thomas W. Merrill, Charles Evans Hughes Professor at Columbia Law School, considers that line to have qualified Arnett in a way that became significant later, by making it clear that any procedures provided by the state in statute or otherwise as a remedy against wrongful deprivation of a property interest still had to meet federal standards.

White stated that much more clearly, and in a way that he later characterized as a rejection of the Arnett plurality's opinion, in 1980's Vitek v. Jones, where a prison inmate challenged his transfer to a psychiatric hospital per state law as nevertheless requiring a preliminary hearing. The state again argued that the plaintiff had adequate procedural protections in the statute. But, White wrote, "These minimum requirements [of procedural due process are] a matter of federal law[;] they are not diminished by the fact that the State may have specified its own procedures that it may deem adequate for determining the preconditions to adverse official action."

==== Logan v. Zimmerman Brush Co. ====
In 1982, after eight years of working out Arnett, the Court heard Logan v. Zimmerman Brush Co. The petitioner, having alleged the respondent fired him due to his disability, had filed a timely complaint with a state administrative agency that was required to hold a fact-finding conference within 120 days. When the respondent noted at the conference that the deadline had been missed by five days, and failed to persuade the agency to dismiss the complaint, it successfully petitioned the Illinois Supreme Court for a writ of prohibition which petitioner appealed to the U.S. Supreme Court.

Blackmun wrote for a five-justice majority on a court that held unanimously that Logan had a property interest in his discrimination claim and that he had unconstitutionally been denied due process when the state administratively voided the claim due to no fault of his own without considering its merits. Powell concurred, joined by Rehnquist, but limited his opinion strictly to the unusual facts of the case and saw no need to make sweeping judgements based on it. In rejecting the statutory provisions the state had followed to the letter as sufficient due process, Villanova professor Karen Flax observes that Logan sub silentio overruled Arnett, as Burger joined Blackmun's majority opinion, leaving Rehnquist alone with his Arnett theory of property (Stewart, the other member of that case's plurality, had left the Court the year before Logan).

==== Cleveland Board of Education v. Loudermill ====
In 1985 another case of a public employee alleging the lack of a hearing prior to termination was a due process violation came to the Supreme Court on appeal from the Sixth Circuit. A 1980 background check discovered that James Loudermill, a security guard employed in the Cleveland schools through a private contractor the year before, had not disclosed a 1968 grand larceny conviction in response to a question on the application asking if he had any felony convictions when he was hired in 1979. He said he believed the conviction had been a misdemeanor, and stated as such in his response to the termination letter he received. A referee recommended Loudermill be reinstated, but the city's Civil Service Commission rejected it and upheld the firing.

Loudermill could have sought state judicial review but instead filed a Section 1983 suit in federal court for the Northern District of Ohio, alleging that his rights had been violated when he was dismissed not only without a pretermination hearing but an opportunity to respond. It was dismissed for failure to state a claim, with the court holding to the Arnett precedent that despite his clear property interest in the job he was not entitled to those processes absent statutory language allowing them. Loudermill appealed to the Sixth Circuit, which joined the case with another brought by Richard Donnelly, a school bus mechanic in the Cleveland suburb of Parma who, following his dismissal for failing an eye examination, had gone through the same process (with similar results due to Loudermill's precedent) but had also sought state review, going as far as the Ohio Supreme Court denying his petition for review.

Judge William H. Timbers of the Second Circuit, sitting by designation, wrote for himself and Gilbert S. Merritt Jr. in considering the "seminal" opinions in Arnett. The school districts in both cases urged the court to adopt the plurality opinion, but Timbers said it had "yet to be enshrined in our law" and noted that courts had overwhelmingly preferred to rely on Powell's concurrence. Therefore, the majority distinguished the case from Mathews and held a pretermination hearing was required, vacating that part of the district court's ruling. Dissenting Judge Harry W. Wellford concurred in some minor aspects of the majority holding but dissented from that view, finding that what Loudermill and Donnelly had received in due process prior to termination was equivalent to what Kennedy had gotten, and none of the majority's precedents were apposite.

Both school districts petitioned the Court for certiorari. Loudermill cross-petitioned, seeking reversal of the parts of the Sixth Circuit's ruling adverse to him. The Court granted all three in 1984 and heard arguments that December.

The Court issued its decision in March 1985. All the justices save Rehnquist, who by then had replaced Burger as Chief Justice, held for Loudermill and Donnelly. White wrote for the majority, observing that the district court had relied on the Arnett plurality in dismissing the cases. While that had sometimes seemed to have gained acceptance in Goss and other cases, Vitek and Logan to him indicated that the majority of the Court rejected it. So it was time to say so explicitly:

In light of these holdings, it is settled that the "bitter with the sweet" approach misconceives the constitutional guarantee. If a clearer holding is needed, we provide it today. The point is straightforward: the Due Process Clause provides that certain substantive rights—life, liberty, and property—cannot be deprived except pursuant to constitutionally adequate procedures. The categories of substance and procedure are distinct. Were the rule otherwise, the Clause would be reduced to a mere tautology.

For this reason, White concluded, some form of hearing, not fully adversarial but at least notice and an opportunity to respond to any charges underlying termination, was required of public employers. "The opportunity to present reasons, either in person or in writing, why proposed action should not be taken is a fundamental due process requirement", he wrote. "The tenured public employee is entitled to oral or written notice of the charges against him, an explanation of the employer's evidence, and an opportunity to present his side of the story."

Marshall concurred in the judgement, but restated his belief that public employees were entitled to a full adversarial hearing if they wanted one prior to termination since they might be facing a potentially catastrophic loss of income, even temporarily. "[I]n requiring only that the employee have an opportunity to respond before his wages are cut off, without affording him any meaningful chance to present a defense, the Court is willing to accept an impermissibly high risk of error with respect to a deprivation that is substantial", he wrote. Brennan, in a separate opinion that concurred in most of the majority opinion, indicated his agreement with Marshall and added his concern that the Court should have been more specific about the level of process required, since even though the respondents here had been satisfied with what the Court granted them other litigants, especially those who disputed their employers' versions of the facts, would benefit from a pretermination adversarial hearing. He also felt the record was insufficient for the majority to have so lightly dismissed the issue of the long delay both respondents faced in getting a hearing after termination and would have remanded the case to district court to better develop the evidence.

Rehnquist began his dissent, one of the few times a Chief Justice has been the sole dissenter, by quoting at length from the relevant portion of his Arnett opinion, followed by the statute that outlined what both respondents could have been terminated for. After summarizing the following paragraph and the procedure they were entitled to, he wrote that "in one legislative breath Ohio has conferred upon civil service employees such as respondents in these cases a limited form of tenure during good behavior, and prescribed the procedures by which that tenure may be terminated." Rehnquist then quoted from the words of Justice Potter Stewart, the third member of the Arnett plurality (who had also by then left the Court), in Roth, to the effect of property interests deriving from state law, and exhorted his colleagues "to recognize the totality of the State's definition of the property right in question, and not merely seize upon one of several paragraphs in a unitary statute to proclaim that in that paragraph the State has inexorably conferred upon a civil service employee something which it is powerless under the United States Constitution to qualify in the next paragraph of the statute." By reading the statute so selectively, the majority had made it easier through "somewhat tortured reasoning" to construe the plaintiffs' claims as a property interest.

In its absence, the balancing-test approach the Court had been employing had reached results Rehnquist admitted might be

... quite unobjectionable, but it seems to me that it is devoid of any principles which will either instruct or endure. The balance is simply an ad hoc weighing which depends to a great extent upon how the Court subjectively views the underlying interests at stake. The results in previous cases and in these cases have been quite unpredictable. To paraphrase Justice Black, today's balancing act requires a "pretermination opportunity to respond" but there is nothing that indicates what tomorrow's will be. The results from today's balance certainly do not jibe with the result in Goldberg or [Mathews]. The lack of any principled standards in this area means that these procedural due process cases will recur time and again. Every different set of facts will present a new issue on what process was due and when. One way to avoid this subjective and varying interpretation of the Due Process Clause in cases such as these is to hold that one who avails himself of government entitlements accepts the grant of tenure along with its inherent limitations.

== Analysis and commentary ==
A comment in the William & Mary Law Review later in 1974 expressed doubt that the case would stand as precedent in other cases involving government employees alleging wrongful termination, even those with minimal factual differences, due to the fractured nature of the opinions. The plurality's "analysis appears vulnerable on several fronts", it said. Strongest among them was the context in which the FFLA was passed:

At the time of its enactment in 1912, constitutional due process was not deemed protective of governmental employment since employees were considered privileged to hold their positions without a right to expect continued employment. Rather than limiting the constitutional protections applicable to disciplined federal employees, Congress just as readily may be presumed to have been providing civil servants with procedural safeguards which they had not enjoyed previously. Congress may well have been concerned that federal employees were not receiving sufficient protection, rather than receiving so much that the system would be unduly burdened absent some restriction

The comment found further flaws in the other opinions. Marshall had pointed out to the plurality that in other cases where it held a pretermination or predeprivation hearing constitutionally required was the statute held to be an inherent limitation on the property interest. But none of those cases had included statutory provisions for the termination or revocation of that interest, either. And Powell's "legislative grace" remark was, the comment held, a misreading of Rehnquist's formula: "[He] did not claim that the right to due process springs directly from the statute involved; he merely adduced that the right to due process attaches, in the absence of a contract, only if Congress creates a property interest."

"The lack of a uniform rationale among the opinions emphasiz[es] the likelihood that Kennedy perhaps would not be followed were even a slightly different state government employee removal statute to be challenged", the comment concluded. "The Kennedy opinions may be less significant for their approbation of adverse action under the Lloyd-LaFollette Act than for their rejection of the plurality's argument that a statute can limit the entitlement it creates ... Contrasting the relative solidarity of the six Justices on the attachment issue with their lack of agreement on the results of the balancing process indicates that Kennedy will provide only weak authority for upholding other termination procedures that may work even a slight shift in the balance of conflicting interests."

In a Harvard Civil Rights–Civil Liberties Law Review comment a year later, Philip Byler was unreservedly critical of the plurality. Roth, from which Rehnquist had said it was derived, "did not contemplate legislative definition of the procedures safeguarding property interests free from judicial scrutiny." Instead it proposed the two-part test, which the Court has followed in other cases, of first determining whether a property interest exists, and then if there is what process is necessary. "Rehnquist destroyed the constitutional implications of Roth by collapsing the second stage of the test, determining the appropriate procedural protections, into the first, determining the substantive nature of the interest."

As a practical matter, Byler argued, that would give legislatures "unlimited discretion to define the procedural protections applicable to statutorily created property rights." The only check on that power would be "the political power of the groups adversely affected." Byler suggested instead that the Court renew its commitment to the Roth test, otherwise it would "effectively undermine the legislative-judicial separation of powers that [Rehnquist] had elsewhere been so anxious to protect." He also says Rehnquist ignored the LLFA's legislative history.

Rehnquist was not the only justice whose opinion came in for criticism from Byler. Powell had rejected the use of pretermination hearings by other federal agencies as an argument for requiring one in the instant case, saying their use could not be taken to mean they were constitutionally mandated. But they were cited not to support that argument, instead to show that such hearings need not be as administratively burdensome as skeptics believed. "[He] fails to recognize that the admittedly important government interest in efficiency would not be substantially adversely affected by the procedural safeguards sought by Kennedy."

As Marshall had, Byler faulted Powell for his dismissive attitude to some of the hardships that those believing themselves to have been wrongfully terminated may experience while awaiting a post-termination hearing, since they could be remedied if the hearing vindicated the employee. "Reinstatement and back pay may remedy a wrong, but they do not justify it" Byler wrote. "The Court should not embrace the proposition that a wrong may be done if it can be undone."

In a 1982 paper, Emory professor Timothy Terrell said that the Arnett plurality at least acknowledges a reality of property that Logan and later decisions avoided discussing: the connection between substance and procedure. To him the need for due process is strongest in situations like Arnett and Logan where the government is the only available option for dispute resolution.

== See also ==
- List of overruled United States Supreme Court decisions
- List of United States Supreme Court cases by the Burger Court
- List of United States Supreme Court cases involving the First Amendment
