= Carey v. Brown =

- Supreme Court of the United States

Argued April 15, 1980 Decided June 20, 1980
- Full case name: Carey, State's Attorney of Cook County, v. Brown et al.
- Citations: 447 U.S. 455 (more) 100 S. Ct. 2286; 65 L. Ed. 2d 263; 1980 U.S. LEXIS 118
- Argument: Oral argument

Case history
- Prior: Summary judgment granted for defendants, Brown v. Scott, 462 F.Supp. 518 (N.D. Ill. 1978); Reversed, Brown v. Scott, 602 F.2d 791 (7th Cir. 1979); cert. granted, 444 U. S. 1011 (1980)

Holding
- A ban on picketing of residences violates the Equal Protection clause if it has an exception allowing labor-related picketing.

Court membership
- Chief Justice Warren E. Burger Associate Justices William J. Brennan Jr. · Potter Stewart; Byron White · Thurgood Marshall; Harry Blackmun · Lewis F. Powell Jr. William Rehnquist · John P. Stevens

Case opinions
- Majority: Brennan, joined by Stewart, White, Marshall, Powell, Stevens
- Concurrence: Stewart
- Dissent: Rehnquist, joined by Burger, Blackmun

Laws applied
- U.S. Const. amends. I, XVI, Chicago Police Dept. v. Mosley

Carey v. Brown, 447 U.S. 455 (1980), is a decision of the United States Supreme Court dealing with freedom of speech under the First Amendment. A law passed by the state of Illinois had banned picketing in front of residences, but it had made an exception for labor disputes. A group of activists challenged the law after being convicted for protesting in front of the home of the mayor of Chicago regarding a lack of racial integration. The Court found that the law's distinction–based on the subject matter of a protest–was unjustified and unconstitutional.

== Background ==
The Illinois Residential Picketing Statute had been passed in 1967; the Chicago Tribune commented at the time that "Chicago Mayor Daley's home has been a prime target" of past protests.

In 1977, a group called the Committee Against Racism ("CAR") wanted to protest in Chicago against racism, and they were particularly upset at Mayor Michael Bilandic for not supporting busing as a way to speed up racial integration of Chicago schools. On September 6, they held a protest in front of the mayor's home over this issue, and about 20 people were arrested under the law, which stated:

It is unlawful to picket before or about the residence or dwelling of any person, except when the residence or dwelling is used as a place of business. However, this Article does not apply to a person peacefully picketing his own residence or dwelling and does not prohibit the peaceful picketing of a place of employment involved in a labor dispute or the place of holding a meeting or assembly on premises commonly used to discuss subjects of general public interest.

— Brown v. Scott, 462 F. Supp. 518 (1978, ND Illinois), (Judge John F. Grady, quoting Ill.Rev.Stat. ch. 38, § 21.1-2, as it stood in 1978)

Members of the group then sued the government (including the city of Chicago, Cook County, and the state of Illinois) to block the law's enforcement and to have it declared unconstitutional.

== Proceedings in lower courts ==
=== In the district court ===
The lawsuit was filed in the federal Northern District of Illinois. The members of the Committee Against Racism made a number of legal arguments, including that the statute was vague or overbroad, and Judge Grady disagreed with these, and the judge similarly disagreed with a number of technical arguments made by the government, such as waiver of certain issues because of the prior criminal trial (those who had been arrested simply plead guilty).

Judge Grady also noted the plaintiff's argument that the law's exception for labor picketing made the law unconstitutional. In general, the combination of the First Amendment and the Equal Protection clause prohibits most attempts to regulate the content of speech, and making distinctions between subject matters is one way to regulate content. The Supreme Court had ruled in the 1972 case Chicago Police Dept. v. Mosley that an anti-picketing law was unconstitutional because it had an exception allowing labor-related picketing, and their reasoning was that the law made a content-based regulation.

However, the judge thought the argument didn't work in this case because the mayor's house was not a place of employment (he implicitly assumed that labor protestors would not picket a residence that was unrelated to their work). In other words, the law regulated "the 'neutral' ground of place rather than the impermissible ground of subject matter." Finding no constitutional problem with the law, the court ruled against the plaintiffs, and they appealed.

=== In the Court of Appeals ===
The Court of Appeals for the Seventh Circuit reversed, overturning the statute. The appeals court thought the district judge had misread the statute:

Unless the "place of employment" clause refers to a place of employment that is also a residence or dwelling, the clause is utterly unnecessary, because nothing in the article purports to prohibit picketing at any place that is not a residence or dwelling... Accordingly, at a residence that is also a place of employment, the statute allows labor picketing but not picketing for any other purpose.

— Brown v. Scott, 602 F.2d 791 (7th. Cir. 1979) (Judge Philip Willis Tone, writing for the unanimous panel)

Consequently, the state of Illinois must have believed when passing the law that labor picketing at a residence "'is not an undue interference' with the peace and privacy of the home." Lacking any evidence that it would be more disruptive, picketing on other subjects could not be prohibited under this statute.

== Decision of the Supreme Court ==
By a vote of 6–3, the Supreme Court affirmed the Court of Appeals and held that the statute was unconstitutional.

=== Majority opinion ===
Justice Brennan, writing for the majority, explained that the court was applying the same reasoning it had used in Mosley:

When government regulation discriminates among speech-related activities in a public forum, the Equal Protection Clause mandates that the legislation be finely tailored to serve substantial state interests, and the justifications offered for any distinctions it draws must be carefully scrutinized... As we explained in Mosley: "Chicago may not vindicate its interest in preventing disruption by the wholesale exclusion of picketing on all but one preferred subject. Given what Chicago tolerates from labor picketing, the excesses of some nonlabor picketing may not be controlled by a broad ordinance prohibiting both peaceful and violent picketing.

— Carey v. Brown, 447 U.S. 455 (1980) (Justice William Brennan, writing for the majority)

In its argument before the Supreme Court, the defendants had asserted that the state of Illinois was trying to provide "special protection for labor protests," and this justified the way the statute was written. The majority responded that, while this concern for labor picketing was "commendable", it in no way justified a content-based restriction on speech, and the argument even acknowledged that the law intended to distinguish speech based on its content.

=== Stewart's concurrence ===
Justice Stewart wrote a brief concurrence to emphasize that he thought the outcome of the case was simply a matter of applying "the basic meaning of the constitutional protection of free speech," rather than applying the Equal Protection clause.

=== Rehnquist's dissent ===
Justice Rehnquist wrote a dissent that was joined by Chief Justice Burger and Justice Blackmun. The dissent expressed frustration that, while the Supreme Court had many "hymns of praise in prior opinions celebrating carefully drawn statutes," in cases like this, the state would have been better off including no exceptions at all in its law. The law effectively had four exceptions:

1. "First, if the residence is used as a "place of business" all peaceful picketing is allowed."
2. "Second, if the residence is being used to "hol[d] a meeting or assembly on premises commonly used to discuss subjects of general public interest" all peaceful picketing is allowed."
3. "Third, if the residence is also used as a "place of employment" which is involved in a labor dispute, labor-related picketing is allowed."
4. "Finally, the statute provides that a resident is entitled to picket his own home."

Since it was uncontested that states were allowed to prohibit picketing of residences in general, the dissent felt that the majority's focus on the third exception was excessive.

== See also ==
- Chicago Police Dept. v. Mosley
