= Gay Alliance of Students v. Matthews =

Gay Alliance of Students v. Matthews, 544 F.2d 162 (1976) is a United States Court of Appeals for the Fourth Circuit case in which a student at Virginia Commonwealth University sued Alfred T. Matthews, Dean of Student Life and Wyndham B. Blanton, Jr., member of Board of Visitors for recognition and access to university resources as a student organization. Upon application, VCU rejected a group of students' request to practice as an official student group at the university on the basis of the groups advocacy for gay rights and liberation. Two years after the rejection, the 4th District ruled for VCU to reverse their decision and grant the Gay Alliance of Students (GAS) the same rights as registered student organizations at the university are granted.

== Background ==
Originally organized September 1, 1974, GAS founding member, Brenda C. Kriegal, applied for registration as a student organization September 5, 1974. Original officers of the student group also included Sam Riggan, Margaret Ann Trotter, and Chuck Bateman, though founding member Walter Foery would serve as a large role in advocacy for the group.

Stated objectives for the student group were "1. To develop a supportive community among individuals who believe in the individual's right to self determination with specific regard to freedom of choice of sexual orientation and 2. To convene educative situations for the members and for the campus university with regards to gay life "

When submitted to the VCU Office of Student Life, normal practices were not taken and instead the application was forwarded to the Board of Visitors to decide. The board ruled on October 17, 1974, that they would not approve for registration on the basis that the club "was not in the best interest of the institution in terms of the total job of the institution". Out of 145 registered student groups, only GAS was rejected.

== Efforts for registration ==
The method in which the application was submitted was unusual in that it went straight to the Vice President for Student Affairs who then sent it to the Board of Visitors. The result was a ruling to deny the student group from registration (the only group to have been denied) with no further reasoning. Stated in the court case, The organization believed the reasoning for rejection was due to the belief that GAS would "increase the opportunity for homosexual contacts, encourage some students to join the organization who otherwise might not join", that some students would either benefit or not benefit from joining, or it would have no effect, and that "the existence of GAS would tend to attract other homosexuals to VCU." While these reasons were stipulations, the parties claimed that there was evidence of such reasoning in previous correspondence with the Board of Visitors.

== Ruling ==
On November 7, 1975, Judge D. Dortch Warriner ruled that VCU grant the Gay Student Alliance access to university facilities, and access and use of campus media outlets, specifically campus newspapers, radio, and advertising

While the group alone was responsible for all legal fees, GAS organized a dance benefit at Cha Cha Palace on February 15 with a turnout of over 300 people which resulted in success to repay their debt.

=== Supporting cases ===
A number of previous court cases were used to defend the judge's decision. Healy v. James, 408 U.S. 169 (1972) referred to an individual's right to associate with their own personal beliefs and that a university could not restrict such association due to the university's opposition to it. In National Socialist White People's Party v. Ringers, 473 F.2d 1010 (4 Cir. 1973) (in banc), the state must support state institutions to provide support for groups with discriminatory membership policies under the first amendment.

== Community context ==
The Gay Alliance of Students had both in state and out of state support. LGBT publication, The Advocate, and GAS founder, Walter Foery, sent letters back and forth in 1975 regarding support for GAS. The National Gay Task Force, based in New York City, also reached out to Walter and the Gay Alliance of Students in 1975. Members of The National Gay Task Force even put pressure on the Virginia Civil Liberties Union to take the appeals case

Departments within the university also expressed their support in advocating for gay rights and the Gay Alliance of Students. A professor from the VCU School of Social Work and the Direction of Resident Education reached out to praise Walter Foery for his presentations on gay rights and the work of GAS.

While the group alone was responsible for all legal fees, GAS organized a dance benefit at Cha Cha Palace on February 15 with a turnout of over 300 people which resulted in success to repay their debt. The lack of evidence for community opposition does not rule out that there were community and university members who did not support the group's recognition.

== Historic significance ==
In an era where the conversation about homosexuality was gaining momentum (articles such as "How Gay is Gay?" and "Masters & Johnson on Homosexuality" which both appeared in the April issue of 1979 of Time magazine), Gay Alliance of Students v. Matthews was one of many cases taken to the federal courts regarding sexuality. Not only did GAS v. Matthews address homosexuality and individual choice, but it also raised the topic of legislating morality as an institution. The court stated "associations don't act. People do." This case gives insight to the public opinion of homosexuality in that era, and serves as the precedent for other state-institutions faced with regulating exercise of the 1st and 14th Amendments.
