= Christian Legal Society v. Martinez =

- Supreme Court of the United States

Argued April 19, 2010 Decided June 28, 2010
- Full case name: Christian Legal Society Chapter of the University of California, Hastings College of the Law, aka Hastings Christian Fellowship v. Martinez, et al.
- Docket no.: 08-1371
- Citations: 561 U.S. 661 (more) 130 S. Ct. 2971; 177 L. Ed. 2d 838; 2010 U.S. LEXIS 5367
- Argument: Oral argument

Case history
- Prior: Judgment for defendants affirmed, Christian Legal Society v. Kane, 319 F. App'x 645 (9th Cir. 2009), cert. granted, 558 U.S. 661 (2011).
- Subsequent: Sent to Lower, Christian Legal Society v. Wu, 626 F.3d 483 (9th Cir. 2010)

Holding
- The policy of Hastings, which requires student groups to accept all students regardless of their status or beliefs in order to obtain official recognition, is a reasonable, viewpoint-neutral condition on access to the forum; it therefore does not transgress First Amendment limitations.

Court membership
- Chief Justice John Roberts Associate Justices John P. Stevens · Antonin Scalia; Anthony Kennedy · Clarence Thomas; Ruth Bader Ginsburg · Stephen Breyer; Samuel Alito · Sonia Sotomayor

Case opinions
- Majority: Ginsburg, joined by Stevens, Kennedy, Breyer, Sotomayor
- Concurrence: Stevens
- Concurrence: Kennedy
- Dissent: Alito, joined by Roberts, Scalia, Thomas

Laws applied
- U.S. Const. amend. I

Christian Legal Society v. Martinez, 561 U.S. 661 (2010), is a United States Supreme Court case in which the Court upheld, against a First Amendment challenge, the policy of the University of California, Hastings College of the Law, governing official recognition of student groups, which required the groups to accept all students regardless of their status or beliefs in order to obtain recognition.

== Background ==
Hastings's nondiscrimination policy required that recognized student organizations (RSOs) "allow any student to participate, become a member, or seek leadership positions in the organization", regardless of the beliefs or status of that student. In 2004, Christian Legal Society (CLS) applied for RSO status. As an affiliate of the national Christian Legal Society, the group was obliged to adopt bylaws that required "members and officers to sign a 'Statement of Faith' and to conduct their lives in accord with prescribed principles". Those principles included a belief that a marriage between a woman and a man is the only appropriate context for sexual activity; thus, CLS "interprets its bylaws to exclude from affiliation anyone who engages in 'unrepentant homosexual conduct'". In addition, CLS would not admit students whose religious beliefs differed from those set forth in the Statement of Faith.

Hastings denied CLS recognition as a student organization. CLS then asked Hastings for an exemption from its nondiscrimination policy; Hastings declined to provide such an exemption. CLS sued, arguing that the university, as a public institution, could not restrict the group's rights to freedom of speech, association, and religion. The National Center for Lesbian Rights represented Hastings Outlaw, a campus gay rights group that joined Acting Chancellor and Dean Leo P. Martinez to defend the policy. Latham & Watkins decided to represent Hastings pro bono, and former Solicitor General Gregory G. Garre argued the case at the Supreme Court.

== Opinion of the Court ==
CLS argued that Hastings could alter its policy to allow an RSO to exclude a student if that student's "beliefs and conduct" did not correspond with those of the RSO, but could not allow a student to be excluded from an organization based on the student's "status"—that is, race or gender. The Court, in a majority opinion authored by Justice Ruth Bader Ginsburg, held that such a policy would require Hastings to review each RSO's exclusionary rules to determine "whether a student organization cloaked prohibited status exclusion in belief-based garb". The Court offered the example of a hypothetical "Male-Supremacy Club" that forbade a female member from running for its presidency, leaving Hastings to determine whether her election bid was denied because of her sex or because she did not adhere to the doctrine of male supremacy. Since the particular issue in the case involved the exclusion of homosexual students, CLS had asserted that it did not restrict membership based on sexual orientation but based on "conduct and belief that the conduct is not wrong". The Court rejected that distinction, noting that with respect to sexual orientation, the court had "declined to distinguish between status and conduct" and offering a parallel from Bray v. Alexandria Women's Health Clinic: "A tax on wearing yarmulkes is a tax on Jews".

The Court's analysis explained how the instant case differed from two earlier cases involving university funding of student groups. In Healy v. James, 408 U.S. 169 (1972), the Court required Central Connecticut State College to recognize a chapter of the Students for a Democratic Society, and in Rosenberger v. University of Virginia (1995), the Court ruled that student religious publications were entitled to equal funding at the University of Virginia. In these cases, the educational institutions singled out a group for unfavorable treatment based on that group's purpose (leftist activism in the first case and Christian evangelism in the second). In the instant case, by contrast, the Court held that Hastings sought to treat all student groups equally; the CLS, on the other hand, sought an exemption for their particular membership policies.

Thus, the Court held that the Hastings nondiscrimination policy was a reasonable, viewpoint-neutral restriction that did not violate the First Amendment.

=== Stevens' concurrence ===
In his concurring opinion, Justice John Paul Stevens noted that CLS denies membership to those who engage in "unrepentant homosexual conduct" and reasoned that the same argument could be made by groups that "may exclude or mistreat Jews, blacks, and women – or those who do not share their contempt for Jews, blacks, and women".

=== Kennedy's concurrence ===
In his concurring opinion, Justice Anthony Kennedy observed that like-minded students may be less effective when forced to accept members of different viewpoints, but found the benefits of an all-inclusive condition more valuable. Kennedy opined that Hastings' all-comers policy promotes student development and growth, which is a legitimate purpose for a limited forum.

=== Dissent ===
Justice Samuel Alito wrote a dissenting opinion, joined by Chief Justice Roberts and Justices Scalia and Thomas. The dissent disagreed on a major point: whether Hastings' policy was an "all-comers" policy or a "nondiscrimination" policy. If the latter, the Society would not be able to reject members based on their legally protected status but could discriminate on the basis of conduct or belief. Alito likened the case to Boy Scouts v. Dale, where the "message" of the group was burdened by the forced inclusion of unwanted members.

== Subsequent developments ==
The court's decision, especially Ginsburg's discussion of "status" and "conduct", was promptly cited by plaintiffs in Perry v. Schwarzenegger as Supreme Court precedent that sexual orientation is "an identifiable class", opposing the defense's argument that sexual orientation is "behavioral".

On June 30, 2010, Peter Schmidt wrote in the Chronicle of Higher Education that it was unlikely that the ruling would end litigation over policies on student groups and that colleges should not think that their policies on student groups are immune to legal challenges as a result of the decision. Others warned that the decision threatened the rights of on-campus student media organizations.

== See also ==
- Employment Division v. Smith
