= Gravel v. United States =

- Supreme Court of the United States

Argued April 19–20, 1972 Decided June 29, 1972
- Full case name: Gravel v. United States
- Citations: 408 U.S. 606 (more) 92 S. Ct. 2614, 33 L. Ed. 2d 583, 1972 U.S. LEXIS 21

Case history
- Prior: United States v. Doe, 332 F. Supp. 930 (D. Mass. 1971); 455 F.2d 753 (1st Cir. 1972); cert. granted, 405 U.S. 916 (1972).

Holding
- The privileges of the Constitution's Speech or Debate Clause enjoyed by members of Congress also extend to Congressional aides, but not to activity outside the legislative process.

Court membership
- Chief Justice Warren E. Burger Associate Justices William O. Douglas · William J. Brennan Jr. Potter Stewart · Byron White; Thurgood Marshall · Harry Blackmun; Lewis F. Powell Jr. · William Rehnquist

Case opinions
- Majority: White, joined by Burger, Blackmun, Powell, Rehnquist
- Dissent: Stewart (in part)
- Dissent: Douglas
- Dissent: Brennan, joined by Douglas, Marshall

Laws applied
- U.S. Const. art. I § 6, cl. 1

Gravel v. United States, 408 U.S. 606 (1972), was a case regarding the protections offered by the Speech or Debate Clause of the United States Constitution. In the case, the Supreme Court of the United States held that the privileges and immunities of the Constitution's Speech or Debate Clause enjoyed by members of Congress also extend to Congressional aides, but not to activity outside the legislative process.

== History ==
On Saturday, June 26, 1971, Senator Mike Gravel (D-Alaska) received a copy of the Pentagon Papers from Ben Bagdikian, an editor at The Washington Post, in a midnight meeting in front of the Mayflower Hotel. Over the next several days, Gravel (who was dyslexic) was assisted by his congressional office staff in reading and analyzing the report. Worried his home might be raided by the Federal Bureau of Investigation, Gravel smuggled the report (which filled two large suitcases) into his congressional office, which was then guarded by disabled Vietnam veterans.

On the evening of June 29, 1971, Gravel attempted to read the Pentagon Papers into the Congressional Record. A lack of a quorum, however, prevented the Senate from convening. As chair of the Senate Subcommittee on Public Buildings and Grounds, Gravel convened a meeting of the subcommittee and spent an hour reading part of the Pentagon Papers into the record. Prevented by his dyslexia from continuing, Gravel had the remainder of the Pentagon Papers entered into the record.

Gravel subsequently arranged to have the Pentagon Papers published by a private publisher. The publisher was Beacon Press, a non-profit book publisher owned by the Unitarian Universalist Association.

A federal grand jury was subsequently empaneled to investigate possible violations of federal law in the release of the report. Leonard Rodberg, a Gravel aide, was subpoenaed to testify about his role in obtaining and arranging for publication of the Pentagon Papers. Senator Gravel intervened and asked a court to quash the subpoena, contending that forcing Rodberg to testify would violate the Speech or Debate Clause of the Constitution.

A district court refused to grant the motion to quash but did agree to proscribe certain questions. The trial court also held that publication of the Pentagon Papers by a private press was not protected by the Speech or Debate Clause. The Court of Appeals affirmed the district court's ruling (although it modified the categories of barred questions). The United States appealed the barring of questions, and Senator Gravel appealed the ruling regarding publication. The United States Supreme Court granted certiorari.

== Majority holding ==
In a 5–4 ruling, the Supreme Court held that the privileges of the Constitution's Speech or Debate Clause enjoyed by members of Congress also extend to Congressional aides. Rejecting the reasoning of the court of appeals and substituting its own, the court declared that "the privilege available to the aide is confined to those services that would be immune legislative conduct if performed by the Senator himself." However, the Court refused to protect congressional aides from prosecution for criminal conduct, or from testifying at trials or grand jury proceedings involving third party crimes. The Supreme Court also threw out the lower courts' order permitting some questions and barring others, concluding that if the testimony is privileged then the privilege is absolute.

However, the Court upheld the district court's ruling regarding private publication. "[Private] publication by Senator Gravel through the cooperation of Beacon Press was in no way essential to the deliberations of the Senate; nor does questioning as to private publication threaten the integrity or independence of the Senate by impermissibly exposing its deliberations to executive influence."

== Dissents ==
Associate Justice Potter Stewart dissented in part, concluding that the Court had too narrowly construed the protections granted by the Speech or Debate Clause. Justice Stewart would have extended the protections of the clause to cover testimony before a grand jury about preparing for legislative acts as well.

In his dissent, Associate Justice William O. Douglas argued that the private publication was an adjunct of speech or debate function of Senator Gravel, and was therefore protected speech. He further condemned politicians for excessive secrecy and the media for largely failing to challenge it:

The story of the Pentagon Papers is a chronicle of suppression of vital decisions to protect the reputations and political hides of men who worked an amazingly successful scheme of deception on the American people. They were successful not because they were astute, but because the press had become a frightened, regimented, submissive instrument, fattening on favors from those in power and forgetting the great tradition of reporting. To allow the press further to be cowed by grand jury inquiries and prosecution is to carry the concept of "abridging" the press to frightening proportions.

In his dissent, Associate Justice William J. Brennan, Jr. disagreed with the majority's narrow construction of the Speech or Debate Clause, and defined a much broader conception of the right. Brennan was joined by Justices Douglas and Marshall.

== Significance ==
The case is considered a landmark for not only reaffirming the constitutional protections offered by the Speech or Debate Clause, but for narrowing it as well.

== See also ==
- List of United States Supreme Court cases, volume 408
- United States v. Brewster, a related case involving Senator Daniel Brewster
