= Kois v. Wisconsin =

- Supreme Court of the United States

Decided June 26, 1972
- Full case name: John Kois v. Wisconsin
- Citations: 408 U.S. 229 (more) 92 S. Ct. 2245; 33 L. Ed. 2d 312

Case history
- Prior: Conviction upheld, 51 Wis.2d 668, 188 N.W.2d 467 (1971)

Holding
- Nude photographs illustrating a newspaper article they accompany and to which they are rationally related are entitled to freedom of the press protection as incorporated against the states via the Fourteenth Amendment. Wisconsin Supreme Court reversed and remanded.

Court membership
- Chief Justice Warren E. Burger Associate Justices William O. Douglas · William J. Brennan Jr. Potter Stewart · Byron White; Thurgood Marshall · Harry Blackmun; Lewis F. Powell Jr. · William Rehnquist

Case opinions
- Per curiam
- Concurrence: Douglas

Kois v. Wisconsin, 408 U.S. 229 (1972), was a ruling by the U.S. Supreme Court in the case of the obscenity conviction of Milwaukee editor-publisher John Kois, whose underground newspaper Kaleidoscope had published two small photographs of pictures of nudes and a sexually oriented poem entitled "Sex Poem" in 1968. The Supreme Court ruled that, in the context in which they appeared, the photographs were rationally related to a news article which they illustrated and were thus entitled to Fourteenth Amendment protection, and that the poem "bears some of the earmarks of an attempt at serious art" (whether successful or not), and thus was not obscene under the Roth v. United States test ("whether or not the 'dominant' theme of the material appeals to prurient interest"). In the words of the concurring opinion of Justice William O. Douglas, "In this case, the vague umbrella of obscenity laws was used in an attempt to run a radical newspaper out of business and to impose a two-year sentence and a $2,000 fine upon its publisher. If obscenity laws continue in this uneven and uncertain enforcement, then the vehicle has been found for the suppression of any unpopular tract. The guarantee of free expression will thus be diluted and in its stead public discourse will only embrace that which has the approval of five members of this Court."

As alluded to in Justice Douglas' opinion, by this time Kaleidoscope had already been driven out of business.

== See also ==
- List of United States Supreme Court cases, volume 408
- List of United States Supreme Court cases by the Burger Court
- List of United States Supreme Court cases involving the First Amendment
