= Cleveland Board of Education v. Loudermill =

- Supreme Court of the United States

Argued December 3, 1984 Decided March 19, 1985
- Full case name: Cleveland Board of Education v. Loudermill, et al.
- Citations: 470 U.S. 532 (more) 105 S. Ct. 1487; 84 L. Ed. 2d 494; 1985 U.S. LEXIS 68; 53 U.S.L.W. 4306; 1 I.E.R. Cas. (BNA) 424; 118 L.R.R.M. 3041

Court membership
- Chief Justice Warren E. Burger Associate Justices William J. Brennan Jr. · Byron White; Thurgood Marshall · Harry Blackmun; Lewis F. Powell Jr. · William Rehnquist; John P. Stevens · Sandra Day O'Connor

Case opinions
- Majority: White, joined by Burger, Blackmun, Powell, Stevens, O'Connor; Brennan (parts I, II, III, IV); Marshall (part II)
- Concurrence: Marshall
- Concur/dissent: Brennan
- Dissent: Rehnquist

Laws applied
- U.S. Const. amend. XIV, Ohio Rev. Code Ann. Sec. 124.34 (1984)
- This case overturned a previous ruling or rulings
- Arnett v. Kennedy

Cleveland Board of Education v. Loudermill, 470 U.S. 532 (1985), was a United States Supreme Court case in which the Court held that:

- certain public-sector employees can have a property interest in their employment, per Constitutional Due Process. See Board of Regents v. Roth
- this property right entails a right to "some kind of hearing" before being terminated—a right to oral or written notice of charges against them, an explanation of the employer's evidence, and an opportunity to present their sides of the story.
- thus, the pretermination hearing should be an initial check against mistaken decisions—not a full evidentiary hearing, but essentially a determination of whether there are reasonable grounds to believe that the charges against the employee are true and support the proposed action.
- in this case, because the respondents alleged that they had no chance to respond, the District Court erred in dismissing for failure to state a claim.

As a result of the case, public sector employers are required to provide a Loudermill hearing and/or a Loudermill letter before terminating an employee.

== Background ==
=== Facts ===
This case consolidated two Sixth Circuit cases in which Ohio employees, both "classified civil servants" under Ohio law and therefore could be terminated only for cause and with entitlement to post-termination administrative review, were terminated without being afforded a pretermination hearing to respond to the charges:

- In the first, a security guard (James Loudermill) employed by the Cleveland Board of Education was dismissed for failing to disclose a prior felony conviction for grand larceny on his job application.
- In the second, a school bus mechanic (Richard Donnelly) for the Parma Board of Education was discharged because he failed an eye examination.

=== Loudermill's early appeals ===
Loudermill filed an appeal with the Cleveland Civil Service Commission, which, after hearings before a referee and the commission, upheld the dismissal some nine months after the appeal had been filed. Although the commission's decision was subject to review in the state courts, Loudermill instead filed suit in the United States District Court for the Northern District of Ohio.

Loudermill alleged that Sec. 124.34, the Ohio statute providing for administrative review, was unconstitutional on its face because it provided no opportunity for a discharged employee to respond to charges against him prior to removal, thus depriving him of liberty and property without due process. It was also alleged that the statute was unconstitutional as applied because discharged employees were not given sufficiently prompt post-removal hearings.

The District Court dismissed the suit for failure to state a claim on which relief could be granted, holding that because the very statute that created the property right in continued employment also specified the procedures for discharge, and because those procedures were followed, Loudermill was, by definition, afforded all the process due; that the post-termination hearings also adequately protected Loudermill's property interest; and that in light of the commission's crowded docket the delay in processing his appeal was constitutionally acceptable.

=== Donnelly's early appeals ===
Richard Donnelly appealed to the Civil Service Commission, which ordered him reinstated a year later without backpay. The District Court, relying on Loudermill's case, dismissed Donnelly's constitutional challenge for failure to state a claim.

=== Sixth Circuit ===
On a consolidated appeal, a divided panel of the United States Court of Appeals for the Sixth Circuit reversed in part and remanded.

The Court held that both respondents had been deprived of due process and that the compelling private interest in retaining employment, combined with the value of presenting evidence prior to dismissal, outweighed the added administrative burden of a pretermination hearing.

But with regard to the alleged deprivation of liberty and Loudermill's 9-month wait for an administrative decision, the court affirmed the judgment of the District Court, finding no constitutional violation.

== Opinion of the Court ==
On certiorari, the United States Supreme Court affirmed and remanded. The majority opinion was written by Justice White, joined by Burger, Blackmun, Powell, Stevens, and O'Connor.

=== Holding ===
The Court held that all the process that is due is provided by a pretermination opportunity to respond, coupled with post-termination administrative procedures as provided by the Ohio statute. Since respondents alleged that they had no chance to respond, the District Court erred in dismissing their complaints for failure to state a claim.

=== Reasoning ===
In Part II, the Court found that tenured public employees (as characterized in the Ohio statute) "plainly" had a property interest in continued employment. Furthermore, the scope of this property interest was not determined by the procedures provided for its deprivation: The Due Process Clause provides that the substantive rights of life, liberty, and property cannot be deprived except pursuant to constitutionally adequate procedures; since the categories of substance and procedure are distinct, "property" cannot be defined by the procedures provided for its deprivation.

The Due Process Clause of the United States Constitution provides that certain substantive rights such as life, liberty, and property, cannot be deprived except pursuant to constitutionally adequate procedures. The categories of substance and procedure are distinct. Were the rule otherwise, the Clause would be reduced to a mere tautology. "Property" cannot be defined by the procedures provided for its deprivation any more than can life or liberty. The right to due process is conferred, not by legislative grace, but by constitutional guarantee. While the legislature may elect not to confer a property interest in public employment, it may not constitutionally authorize the deprivation of such an interest, once conferred, without appropriate procedural safeguards.

In Part III, the Court—reiterating that the essential requirements of due process are notice and an opportunity to respond—found that employees who have such a constitutionally protected property interest in their employment are entitled to "some kind of hearing" before being terminated. The need for some form of pretermination hearing is evident from a balancing of the competing interests at stake: the private interest in retaining employment, the governmental interests in expeditious removal of unsatisfactory employees and the avoidance of administrative burdens, and the risk of an erroneous termination.

In Part IV, the Court determined the scope of the required pretermination hearing: it need not definitively resolve the propriety of the discharge, but should be an initial check against mistaken decisions—essentially a determination of whether there are reasonable grounds to believe that the charges against the employee are true and support the proposed action. This arises from the essential requirements of due process, notice and an opportunity to respond. Thus, the employees were entitled to a pretermination opportunity to respond but not to a full evidentiary hearing. The employees were entitled to oral or written notice of charges against them, an explanation of the employer's evidence, and an opportunity to present their sides of the story. Because the respondents alleged that they had no chance to respond, the District Court erred in dismissing for failure to state a claim. The Due Process Clause of the United States Constitution provided that certain substantive rights, such as life, liberty, and property, could not be deprived except pursuant to constitutionally adequate procedures. The Court held that all the process that was due was provided by a pretermination opportunity to respond, coupled with post-termination administrative proceedings as provided by Ohio statute. As respondents alleged that they had no chance to respond, the district court erred in dismissing for failure to state a claim.

In Part V, the court found that a 9-month delay in Loudermill's post-termination hearing did not constitute a separate due process violation. The Due Process Clause requires provision of a hearing "at a meaningful time," and here the delay stemmed in part from the thoroughness of the procedures.

== Concurrence ==
Justice Marshall concurred in Part II and in the judgment, stating that before a decision is made to terminate an employee's wages, the employee should be entitled to confront and cross-examine adverse witnesses and to present witnesses on his own behalf whenever there are substantial disputes in testimonial evidence.

Justice Brennan concurred in part and dissented in part, expressing the view that the record was insufficiently developed to permit an informed judgment on the issue of administrative delay and that the security guard's case should be remanded for further evidentiary proceedings.

== Dissent ==
Justice Rehnquist dissented, expressing the view that the Fourteenth Amendment does not support the conclusion that the state's effort to confer a limited form of tenure upon the employees resulted in the creation of a "property right" in their employment.

== See also ==
- Arnett v. Kennedy (1974) - Property interest in employment held by Federal employees
- Cleveland Board of Education v. LaFleur (1974) - Another case involving the school district
- List of United States Supreme Court cases, volume 470
