= Speech or Debate Clause =

Clause in the United States Constitution (Article I, Section 6, Clause 1)

The Speech or Debate Clause is a clause in the United States Constitution (Article I, Section 6, Clause 1) providing legislative immunity. The clause states that "The Senators and Representatives" of Congress "shall in all Cases, except Treason, Felony, and Breach of the Peace, be privileged from Arrest during their attendance at the Session of their Respective Houses, and in going to and from the same; and for any Speech or Debate in either House, they shall not be questioned in any other Place."

The intended purpose is to prevent a U.S. President or other officials of the executive branch from having members arrested on a pretext to prevent them from voting a certain way or otherwise taking actions with which the president might disagree. It also protects members from civil suits related to their official duties.

A similar clause in many state constitutions protects members of state legislatures.

== Text ==
[The Senators and Representatives] shall in all Cases, except Treason, Felony and Breach of the Peace, be privileged from Arrest during their Attendance at the Session of their respective Houses, and in going to and returning from the same; and for any Speech or Debate in either House, they shall not be questioned in any other Place.

== Case law ==
=== Gravel v. United States: congressional aides and private publication ===
On June 15, 1971, Senator Mike Gravel (D-Alaska) received a copy of the Pentagon Papers from Ben Bagdikian, an editor at The Washington Post. Over the next several days, Gravel (who was dyslexic) was assisted by his congressional office staff in reading and analyzing the report. Worried his home might be raided by the Federal Bureau of Investigation, Gravel smuggled the report, which filled two large suitcases, into his Senate office, which was being guarded by disabled Vietnam veterans.

On the evening of June 29, 1971, Gravel attempted to read the Pentagon Papers into the Congressional Record. A lack of a quorum, however, prevented the Senate from convening. As chair of the Senate Subcommittee on Public Buildings and Grounds, Gravel convened a meeting of the subcommittee and spent an hour reading part of the Pentagon Papers into the record. Prevented by his dyslexia from continuing, Gravel had the remainder of the Pentagon Papers entered into the record.

Gravel arranged to have the Pentagon Papers published by a private publisher, Beacon Press, a nonprofit book publisher owned by the Unitarian Universalist Association.

A federal grand jury was empaneled to investigate possible violations of federal law in the release of the report. Leonard Rodberg, a Gravel aide, was subpoenaed to testify about his role in obtaining and arranging for publication of the Pentagon Papers. Senator Gravel intervened and asked a court to quash the subpoena, contending that forcing Rodberg to testify would violate the Speech or Debate Clause. A federal district court refused to grant the motion to quash but did agree to proscribe certain questions. The trial court also held that publication of the Pentagon Papers by a private press was not protected by the Speech or Debate Clause. The Court of Appeals affirmed the district court's ruling, although it modified the categories of barred questions. The United States appealed the barring of questions, and Senator Gravel appealed the ruling regarding publication. The United States Supreme Court granted certiorari.

In Gravel v. United States, 408 U.S. 606 (1972), the Supreme Court held (5–4) that the privileges of the Speech or Debate Clause extend to Congressional aides. Rejecting the reasoning of the Court of Appeals, the Supreme Court held, "the privilege available to the aide is confined to those services that would be immune legislative conduct if performed by the Senator himself".

The Court refused to protect congressional aides either from prosecution for criminal conduct or from testifying at trials or grand jury proceedings involving third-party crimes. The Supreme Court also vacated the lower court's order permitting some questions and barring others, concluding that if the testimony is privileged then the privilege is absolute.

The Supreme Court upheld the district court ruling regarding private publication. "[Private] publication by Senator Gravel through the cooperation of Beacon Press was in no way essential to the deliberations of the Senate; nor does questioning as to private publication threaten the integrity or independence of the Senate by impermissibly exposing its deliberations to executive influence."

The Gravel case narrowed the protections offered by the Speech or Debate Clause.

=== United States v. Rayburn House Office Building: searches of congressional offices ===
In May 2006, the FBI raided the office of Representative William J. Jefferson, a Democratic congressman from Louisiana, in the Rayburn House Office Building on Capitol Hill. The raid took place during the fourteenth month of an investigation into Jefferson's business ventures in Africa.

The FBI raid prompted a bipartisan uproar, with immediate objections from congressional leaders in both parties, who said that the raid was inappropriately aggressive and violated the Speech or Debate Clause. In a statement, Republican Speaker of the House J. Dennis Hastert stated: "The actions of the Justice Department in seeking and executing this warrant raise important Constitutional issues that go well beyond the specifics of this case. Insofar as I am aware, since the founding of our Republic 219 years ago, the Justice Department has never found it necessary to do what it did Saturday night, crossing this Separation of Powers line, in order to successfully prosecute corruption by Members of Congress. Nothing I have learned in the last 48 hours leads me to believe that there was any necessity to change the precedent established over those 219 years." Democratic House Minority Leader Nancy Pelosi stated that while "members of Congress must obey the law and cooperate fully with any criminal investigation", investigations "must be conducted in accordance with Constitutional protections and historical precedent". A number of legal experts stated that the raid was unconstitutional.

Jefferson challenged the raid as a violation of the Speech or Debate Clause, and in 2007, in the case United States v. Rayburn House Office Building, Room 2113, Washington, D.C. 20515, the U.S. Court of Appeals for the District of Columbia Circuit unanimously ruled, 3–0, that the FBI's search was unconstitutional and ordered the FBI to return privileged documents seized in the raid. The court held that "the Congressman is entitled ... to the return of all materials (including copies) that are privileged legislative materials under the Speech or Debate Clause. Where the Clause applies its protection is absolute." The FBI was allowed to retain non-privileged material. While the Justice Department used special "Filter Team" procedures to review documents to determine whether they were related to legislative activity, the court found that this "would not have avoided the violation of the Speech or Debate Clause because they denied the Congressman any opportunity to identify and assert the privilege with respect to legislative materials before their compelled disclosure to Executive agents."

The Supreme Court declined to review the D.C. Circuit's decision. Jefferson was later convicted on the basis of other, unrelated evidence; in 2009, he was found guilty of bribery, racketeering, and money laundering in connection with his acceptance of bribes and payoffs in connection with these ventures; he was acquitted of several other charges.

In a 2011 case, the U.S. Court of Appeals for the Ninth Circuit disagreed with the D.C. Circuit's decision in United States v. Rayburn House Office Building, leading to a circuit split.

=== Wuterich v. Murtha: defamation actions arising from comments made in legislative role ===
In August 2006, U.S. Representative John Murtha was sued by U.S. Marine Corps Staff Sergeant Frank D. Wuterich, over statements that Murtha had made to reporters about the Haditha massacre, an incident in Haditha, Iraq in which 24 civilians were killed after U.S. troops under Wuterich, a squad leader, opened fire. (Wuterich was later court-martialed, and pleaded guilty to one count of negligent dereliction of duty in connection with the Haditha killings in a plea agreement with military prosecutors, following an investigation begun in March 2006.)

In his 2006 complaint, Wuterich sued Murtha, alleging that the congressman's comments to the press that the Haditha killings constituted "cold-blooded murder and war crimes" were defamatory and an invasion of privacy. The remarks were made at a press conference and in a follow-up television interview. Wuterich also sought to compel Murtha to sit for a deposition in the civil case.

In 2007, U.S. District Judge Rosemary M. Collyer ruled that Murtha must testify in the defamation case; in response, commentators expressed concern that Murtha was acting as a lawmaker and was therefore protected by the Speech or Debate Clause. Murtha appealed, arguing that because he was acting in his legislative role when making the comments he had immunity from the lawsuit under the Westfall Act. The Westfall Act is a federal statute that "accords federal employees absolute immunity from common-law tort claims arising out of acts they undertake in the course of their official duties", and immunizes such employees by substituting the United States itself for the employee as defendant in a case. In 2009, the U.S. Court of Appeals for the District of Columbia ruled in Murtha's favor, accepting his argument that he was acting in an official capacity, concluding that he was immune from suit, remanding the case to the district court and ordering dismissal of the case for lack of subject-matter jurisdiction due to sovereign immunity.

=== Smith special counsel investigation: vice presidents ===
Mike Pence, Vice President of the United States in the first Trump administration, was requested by the Jack Smith special counsel investigation to turn over evidence relating to Smith's investigation surrounding the January 6 Capitol attack. A judge ruled in 2023 that the Speech or Debate Clause applies to the vice president whenever they are serving in their role as President of the Senate. However, grand jury testimony and certain evidence, including evidence which furthers a crime, is not precluded.

== See also ==
- Federal prosecution of public corruption in the United States
