= Loudermill letter =

Feature of US employment law

In employment law, a Loudermill letter is a letter that public-sector employers may send to employees giving notice of their intent to suspend, demote, or terminate.

According to Cleveland Bd. of Educ. v. Loudermill, the process that is due a public employee includes a pre-termination hearing that provides "oral or written notice of the charges against him, an explanation of the employer's evidence, and an opportunity to present his side of the story." The Loudermill letter fulfills the requirement of (written) notice, and should include an explanation of the employer's evidence ("to act as a check for mistaken accusations"). To fulfill the remaining Due Process requirements, a Loudermill letter will also have to inform the employee of his opportunity for a Loudermill hearing.

== Content of the letter ==
The formal letter advising the employee that discipline is being considered, and offering the opportunity for the employee to discuss or present his or her version and mitigating evidence, may be the first time the employee is even aware that certain allegations have arisen or that an investigation has been concluded.

The letter usually states that the employee may contact his union representative. The governing contract language may also state that the union representative will receive a copy of the letter
