= Perry v. Sindermann =

- Supreme Court of the United States

Argued January 18, 1972 Decided June 29, 1972
- Full case name: Perry, et al. v. Sindermann
- Citations: 408 U.S. 593 (more) 92 S. Ct. 2694; 33 L. Ed. 2d 570

Case history
- Prior: Sindermann v. Perry, 430 F.2d 939 (5th Cir. 1970), cert. granted, 403 U.S. 917 (1971).

Holding
- Lack of a contractual or tenure right to re-employment, taken alone, did not defeat respondent's claim that the nonrenewal of his contract violated his free speech right under the First and Fourteenth Amendments.

Court membership
- Chief Justice Warren E. Burger Associate Justices William O. Douglas · William J. Brennan Jr. Potter Stewart · Byron White; Thurgood Marshall · Harry Blackmun; Lewis F. Powell Jr. · William Rehnquist

Case opinions
- Majority: Stewart, joined by Burger, White, Blackmun, Rehnquist
- Concurrence: Burger
- Dissent: Brennan, joined by Douglas
- Dissent: Marshall
- Powell took no part in the consideration or decision of the case.

Perry v. Sindermann, 408 U.S. 593 (1972), was a United States Supreme Court decision affecting educational case law involving tenure and due process.

== Facts ==
Sindermann was a educator at several schools in the state college system of the State of Texas under a system of one-year contracts from 1959 to 1969. In 1965, he became a professor at Odessa Junior College, where he was successful enough to be appointed department co-chair for a time. During the 1968-1969 academic year, Sindermann became involved in public disagreements with the policies of the Board of Regents as president of the Texas Junior College Teachers Association. In May 1969, his one-year contract was terminated and was not renewed. The Regents issued a press release alleging insubordination, but no official hearing was provided Sindermann to contest the basis for non-renewal.

== Issues ==
- Does a non-tenured teacher still have due process rights as provided by the Fourteenth Amendment by a de facto tenure policy created by rules and policy?
- Were Sindermann's Fourteenth Amendment due process rights violated?

== Decision ==
In an opinion written by Justice Stewart, the court decided that Sindermann had alleged enough facts to show that he was entitled to some kind of process and that the lack of a contractual or tenure right taken alone did not defeat his claim that the nonrenewal of his contract violated the First and Fourteenth Amendments. While Sindermann did not have tenure per se, his length of service at his last institution (more than the four years mentioned as the probationary period for a full-time instructor in the “Policy Paper 1” guidelines), he had asserted that he had de facto tenure.

The court pointed to Board of Regents v. Roth, 408 U.S. 564 (1972), as an example of a non-tenured teacher not having a claim for a hearing. However, Sindermann was able to point to the policy paper as providing an expectancy of treatment as if being tenured, the expectancy gave him a viable claim that he had a property interest in the job such that it could fall under the protection of the Fourteenth Amendment.

The court ruled that "the respondent must be given an opportunity to prove the legitimate of his claim of such entitlement in light of the policies and practices of the institution. Proof of such a property interest would not, of course, entitle him to reinstatement. But such proof would obligate college officials to grant a hearing at his request, where he could be informed of the grounds for his non-retention and challenge their sufficiency."

The problem that the court faced was that without having a record of a hearing of Sindermann’s non-renewal, the court was unable to determine if Sindermann’s First Amendment right to free speech had been violated since there was no documented reason for the non-renewal. The court required for Sindermann to be given a hearing at which it could be determined if his First Amendment rights had been violated by the Regents' refusal to renew his contract for his public utterances.

Justice Powell took no part in the decision.

Justice Brennan dissented in part, joined by Justice Douglas, place who wrote that since the respondent was denied due process, he should be entitled to summary judgment on that issue.

Justice Marshall also dissented.

== See also ==
- Speiser v. Randall, 357 U.S. 513 (1958)
- List of United States Supreme Court cases involving the First Amendment
- List of United States Supreme Court cases, volume 408
