= List of United States Supreme Court cases, volume 408 =

This is a list of all the United States Supreme Court cases from volume 408 of the United States Reports:

| Case name | Citation | Date decided |
|---|---|---|
| Laird v. Tatum | 408 U.S. 1 | 1972 |
| Gelbard v. United States | 408 U.S. 41 | 1972 |
| Chicago Police Dept. v. Mosley | 408 U.S. 92 | 1972 |
| Grayned v. City of Rockford | 408 U.S. 104 | 1972 |
| United States v. Byrum | 408 U.S. 125 | 1972 |
| Healy v. James | 408 U.S. 169 | 1972 |
| Mancusi v. Stubbs | 408 U.S. 204 | 1972 |
| Combs v. United States | 408 U.S. 224 | 1972 |
| Kois v. Wisconsin | 408 U.S. 229 | 1972 |
| Beecher v. Alabama | 408 U.S. 234 | 1972 |
| Furman v. Georgia | 408 U.S. 238 | 1972 |
| Morrissey v. Brewer | 408 U.S. 471 | 1972 |
| United States v. Brewster (1972) | 408 U.S. 501 | 1972 |
| Board of Regents of State Colleges v. Roth | 408 U.S. 564 | 1972 |
| Perry v. Sindermann | 408 U.S. 593 | 1972 |
| Gravel v. United States | 408 U.S. 606 | 1972 |
| Branzburg v. Hayes | 408 U.S. 665 | 1972 |
| Kleindienst v. Mandel | 408 U.S. 753 | 1972 |
| Moore v. Illinois (1972) | 408 U.S. 786 | 1972 |
| Port of Portland v. United States | 408 U.S. 811 | 1972 |
| Stewart v. Massachusetts | 408 U.S. 845 | 1972 |
| Rosenfeld v. New Jersey | 408 U.S. 901 | 1972 |
