= Loudermill hearing =

Aspect of US employment law

A "Loudermill" hearing is part of the "due process" requirement that must be provided to a public employee prior to removing or impacting the employment property right (e.g. imposing severe discipline).

The purpose of a "Loudermill hearing" is to provide an employee an opportunity to present their side of the story before the employer makes a decision on discipline.

Prior to the hearing, the employee must be given a Loudermill letter–i.e. specific written notice of the charges and an explanation of the employer's evidence so that the employee can provide a meaningful response and an opportunity to correct factual mistakes in the investigation and to address the type of discipline being considered.

== Loudermill v. Board of Education ==
The term stems from Loudermill v. Cleveland Board of Education, in which the United States Supreme Court held that non-probationary civil servants had a property right to continued employment and such employment could not be denied to employees unless they were given an opportunity to hear and respond to the charges against them prior to being deprived of continued employment.

The underlying principle in Loudermill is that because dismissals often involve factual disputes, a hearing provides the employee an opportunity to explain and refute any conclusions the employer reached which caused the employee's discharge.

=== Expansion ===
Since the time that case was decided, certain other courts of law have held that the right to hear and respond to the charges extends not just to denials of continued employment, but to denials of continued employment at the current rate of pay. Thus State agencies offer this pre-deprivation hearing or Loudermill hearing in cases of discharge, demotion and unpaid suspension of non-probationary classified employees.

Although Loudermill was a case involving the termination of a public employee, the ruling has been applied to situations where the proposed discipline deprives the employee of any property interest (e.g. wages) or liberty interest (e.g. damage to reputation).

== Requirements of the hearing ==
In addition to a pretermination (Loudermill) hearing, an employee must be afforded a hearing, after the termination takes effect. However, the scope of the pretermination hearing depends upon the scope of the post-termination hearing available to the employee. If a full post-termination hearing is available, the Loudermill pretermination hearing is minimal.

In such situations the employee would have an opportunity to respond in the pretermination hearing as long as she had available a post-termination hearing. Thus, the pre-termination hearing functions as "an initial check against mistaken decision -- essentially a determination of whether there are reasonable grounds to believe that the charges against the employee are true and support the proposed action." If a pretermination hearing is "oral or written notice of the charges against [the employee], an explanation of the employer's evidence [against the employee], and an opportunity [for the employee] to present their side of the story."

In West v. Grand County, the U.S. Court of Appeals for the 10th Circuit quoted Loudermill, stating:

The Standards for a pre-termination hearing are not stringent because of the expectation that a more formal post-termination hearing will remedy any resulting, deficiencies. '[T]he pre-termination hearing though necessary, need not be elaborate. ... [T]he formality and procedural requisites for the hearing can vary, depending upon the importance of the interests involved and the nature of the subsequent proceedings'.

The holding in Loudermill goes on to state, "The pre-termination hearing need not definitively resolve the propriety of the discharge. It should be an initial check against mistaken decisions - essentially, a determination of whether there are reasonable grounds to believe that the charges against the employee are true and support the proposed action." Thus, this type of hearing does not need to be elaborate and does not require a full-blown court-type evidentiary hearing.

The court in West stated: "We have held that pre-termination warnings and an opportunity for a face-to-face meeting with supervisors and a conversation between an employee and their supervisor immediately prior to the employee's termination were sufficient to satisfy constitutional requirements." Thus an employee does not have the right to confront or cross-examine witnesses, nor does he have the right to legal counsel or other representation during the hearing.

== See also ==
- Waters v. Churchill, 511 U.S. 661 (1994)
- Cox v. Roskelly, 359 F.3d 1105 (9th Cir. 2004)
- West v. Grand County, 967 F.2d 362, 368 (10th Cir.1992)
