= Police Department of Chicago v. Mosley =

- Supreme Court of the United States

Argued January 19, 1972 Decided June 26, 1972
- Full case name: Police Department of the City of Chicago et al. v. Mosley.
- Citations: 408 U.S. 92 (more) 92 S. Ct. 2286; 33 L. Ed. 2d 212
- Argument: Oral argument

Case history
- Prior: 432 F.2d 1256 (7th Cir. 1970); cert. granted, 404 U.S. 821 (1971).

Holding
- A city ordinance prohibiting all picketing within 150 feet of a school, unless the school is undergoing a labor dispute, is unconstitutional under the First and Fourteenth Amendments.

Court membership
- Chief Justice Warren E. Burger Associate Justices William O. Douglas · William J. Brennan Jr. Potter Stewart · Byron White; Thurgood Marshall · Harry Blackmun; Lewis F. Powell Jr. · William Rehnquist

Case opinions
- Majority: Marshall, joined by Douglas, Brennan, Stewart, White, Powell
- Concurrence: Blackmun (without a written opinion), joined by Rehnquist
- Concurrence: Burger

Police Department of Chicago v. Mosley, 408 U.S. 92 (1972), was a United States Supreme Court case which concerned freedom of speech under the First Amendment. Oral argument for this case was consolidated with Grayned v. City of Rockford, but separate opinions were issued for each. Earl Mosley had protested employment discrimination by carrying a sign on the sidewalk in front of a Chicago high school, until the city of Chicago made it illegal to do so. Although Chicago believed that its ordinance was a time, place, or manner restriction, and therefore was a constitutional law, the Supreme Court ruled that it was a content-based restriction, because it treated labor-related protests differently from other protests. Since the ordinance did not meet the higher standards for content-based restrictions, it was ruled unconstitutional.

== Background ==
=== Factual background ===
Over the course of seven months in 1967 and 1968, Earl Mosley had frequently picketed the Jones Commercial High School in Chicago with a sign that read: "Jones High School practices black discrimination. Jones High School has a black quota." As the city of Chicago would admit during litigation, Mosley's protests were "always peaceful, orderly, and quiet." Still, effective April 5, 1968, Chicago amended its disorderly conduct ordinance in a way that outlawed his protests:

"A person commits disorderly conduct when he knowingly:

.....

"(i) Pickets or demonstrates on a public way within 150 feet of any primary or secondary school building while the school is in session and one-half hour before the school is in session and one-half hour after the school session has been concluded, provided that this subsection does not prohibit the peaceful picketing of any school involved in a labor dispute . . . ." Municipal Code, c. 193-1 (i).

— Police Dept. of Chicago v. Mosley, 408 U.S. 92, 92-93 (1972), quoting the ordinance in question

When he saw a notice of the ordinance in a newspaper, Mosley called the police department, who advised him that he'd be arrested if he kept up his protest. Mosley did stop protesting, but he filed a lawsuit in federal court in the Northern District of Illinois to overturn the ordinance.

=== Proceedings in lower courts ===
The trial court sided with the city and issued a directed verdict upholding the ordinance, reasoning that it met the standards for a time, place, or manner restriction. On appeal, however, the Seventh Circuit ruled that it was overbroad. Because the law could apply to circumstances where the city had not demonstrated any real reason to prohibit all peaceful protests (such as Mr. Mosley's), it prohibited speech more broadly than the constitution would allow:

In the subject case where the sole question is right of access to a public way for the purpose of expression of views and where there is no danger of interference with a valid state interest, plaintiff's First Amendment right to picket may not be constitutionally denied.

— Mosley v. Police Dept. of Chicago, 432 F.2d 1256 (7th Cir. 1970) (Judge John Simpson Hastings, writing for the court)

Chicago appealed the ruling to the U.S. Supreme Court.

=== Consolidation with Grayned v. City of Rockford ===
The same year, the U.S. Supreme Court also accepted an appeal from the Illinois Supreme Court in Grayned v. City of Rockford. In that case, the Illinois Supreme Court had upheld two of Rockford's ordinances; one was an anti-noise ordinance, and the other an anti-picketing ordinance that was identical to Chicago's ordinance.

== Decision ==
The Supreme Court unanimously upheld the Seventh Circuit's decision, holding that the ordinance was unconstitutional. Six justices supported the majority opinion, two concurred without writing or joining an opinion, and Chief Justice Burger wrote a separate concurrence.

=== Majority opinion ===
In an opinion by Justice Thurgood Marshall, the Court ruled that the Chicago's ordinance prohibiting non-labor pickets on school property violated the First Amendment's Freedom to Protest, as well as the Fourteenth Amendment of equal protection under the law. While some of oral argument focused on whether different possible variations on the ordinance–such as whether a radius smaller than 150 feet would be acceptable, or whether the ordinance could affect just school property as opposed to "a public way" outside–the opinion ultimately focused on the fact that labor disputes were treated differently from any other type of speech. That meant the Court had to consider whether it violated the Equal Protection clause, and it found that it did:

The Equal Protection Clause requires that statutes affecting First Amendment interests be narrowly tailored to their legitimate objectives. Chicago may not vindicate its interest in preventing disruption by the wholesale exclusion of picketing on all but one preferred subject. Given what Chicago tolerates from labor picketing, the excesses of some nonlabor picketing may not be controlled by a broad ordinance prohibiting both peaceful and violent picketing.

— Police Dept. of Chicago v. Mosley, 408 U.S. 92 (1972) (Justice Marshall, writing for the court)

This opinion contains what would become an often-quoted statement about the First Amendment's strong protection for free speech:

But, above all else, the First Amendment means that government has no power to restrict expression because of its message, its ideas, its subject matter, or its content.

— Police Dept. of Chicago v. Mosley, 408 U.S. at 95 (1972) (Justice Marshall, writing for the majority)

=== Burger's concurrence ===
Chief Justice Warren Burger wrote a short concurrence in order to state that, although he agreed with the majority on this case's outcome, "the First Amendment does not literally mean that we 'are guaranteed the right to express any thought...'"
