= Board of Regents of State Colleges v. Roth =

- Supreme Court of the United States

Argued January 18, 1972 Decided June 29, 1972
- Full case name: Board of Regents of State Colleges, et al. v. Roth
- Citations: 408 U.S. 564 (more) 92 S. Ct. 2701; 33 L. Ed. 2d 548; 1972 U.S. LEXIS 131; 1 I.E.R. Cas. (BNA) 23

Holding
- The Fourteenth Amendment does not require opportunity for a hearing prior to the nonrenewal of a nontenured state teacher's contract unless he can show that the nonrenewal deprived him of an interest in "liberty" or that he had a "property" interest in continued employment.

Court membership
- Chief Justice Warren E. Burger Associate Justices William O. Douglas · William J. Brennan Jr. Potter Stewart · Byron White; Thurgood Marshall · Harry Blackmun; Lewis F. Powell Jr. · William Rehnquist

Case opinions
- Majority: Stewart, joined by Burger, White, Blackmun, Rehnquist
- Concurrence: Burger
- Dissent: Douglas
- Dissent: Brennan, joined by Douglas
- Dissent: Marshall
- Powell took no part in the consideration or decision of the case.

Laws applied
- U.S. Const. amends. I, XIV

Board of Regents of State Colleges v. Roth, 408 U.S. 564 (1972), was a case decided by the United States Supreme Court concerning alleged discrimination against a nontenured teacher at Wisconsin State University-Oshkosh.

David Roth was hired as a first year assistant professor of political science in 1968 for a fixed term of one year, with a possibility of extension on mutual consent of the parties. In accordance with procedural rules set by the Board of Regents, the president of the University informed Roth he would not be rehired for the next academic year, giving him no reason for the decision and no opportunity to challenge it in any sort of hearing. The Board's employment rules provided opportunity for review of teachers "dismissed" before the end of the employment term, but did not extend these protections to teachers whose contracts were simply not renewed.

Roth brought suit in federal district court alleging that he was being punished for statements he had made that were critical of the university administration. He said the decision not to rehire him infringed his First Amendment right to freedom of speech. He also alleged that the university's failure to provide a hearing violated his Fourteenth Amendment right to procedural due process of law.

In an opinion delivered by Justice Stewart, the Supreme Court held that the Fourteenth Amendment does not require an opportunity for a hearing prior to the nonrenewal of a nontenured state teacher's contract, unless he can show that the nonrenewal deprived him of an interest in "liberty" or that he had a "property" interest in continued employment, despite the lack of tenure or a formal contract.

Justice Douglas dissented, writing "When a violation of First Amendment rights is alleged, the reasons for dismissal or for nonrenewal of an employment contract must be examined to see if the reasons given are only a cloak for activity or attitudes protected by the Constitution."

Justice Marshall wrote a separate dissent saying that "every citizen who applies for a government job is entitled to it unless the government can establish some reason for denying the employment." He held government to higher scrutiny than private employers and said that government employees deserve "fair and adequate information" at their terminations in order to protect against arbitrary behavior.

== See also ==
- Perry v. Sindermann, 408 U.S. 593 (1972)
- List of United States Supreme Court cases involving the First Amendment
- List of United States Supreme Court cases, volume 408
