= Healy v. James =

- Supreme Court of the United States

Argued March 28, 1972 Decided June 26, 1972
- Full case name: Healy, et al. v. James, et al.
- Citations: 408 U.S. 169 (more) 92 S. Ct. 2338; 33 L. Ed. 2d 266; 1972 U.S. LEXIS 160

Court membership
- Chief Justice Warren E. Burger Associate Justices William O. Douglas · William J. Brennan Jr. Potter Stewart · Byron White; Thurgood Marshall · Harry Blackmun; Lewis F. Powell Jr. · William Rehnquist

Case opinions
- Majority: Powell, joined by Burger, Douglas, Brennan, Stewart, White, Marshall, Blackmun
- Concurrence: Burger
- Concurrence: Douglas
- Concurrence: Rehnquist

Laws applied
- U.S. Const. amends. I, XIV

Healy v. James, 408 U.S. 169 (1972), was a United States Supreme Court case in which the Court held that Central Connecticut State College's refusal to recognize a campus chapter of Students for a Democratic Society was unconstitutional. The denial of official recognition was found to violate the First Amendment.

The crux of the ruling was that the onus was on the college to provide valid reasons for denial, rather than insisting that the organization provide evidence that their recognition would not be harmful.

== Legal background ==
The Supreme Court case of Healy v. James ruled in favor of Students for a Democratic Society (SDS) organization. The President of Central Connect State College (CCSC) refused to recognize the association to the fullest extent that other clubs, and organizations were recognized as. Four main justifications assembled are reasonable concerns for not recognizing SDS according to the president F. Don James. Those four consist of affiliation, philosophy, disruptive influence, and prior affirmation of reasonable university rules. These four were the arguments made by the president of the school as concrete reasons for not recognizing SDS.

Four reasons: Justification for non-recognition

1. Affiliation: The argument made here by the president of CCSC was that there was no proof that the local SDS organization was not linked with the National one. The president of the college backed his claim even when the student from the local SDS organization made the statement that the name "SDS" was simply similar because the group hoped it would appeal to more people to join as it was a well known leftist organization. The court explained that just because the president believed that the two organizations were linked does not provide enough evidence to support the reasoning for not recognizing the group.
2. Philosophy: Following the theory that the local and national SDS were linked, president James made the claim that the two groups had the same or similar philosophies. The national SDS policies were seen by the president as "abhorrent" to the official college's policies. Therefore James made the argument that because the group's philosophies went against those of the college he could not sanction the group, and therefore, could not recognize it. The court explained that the college could not restrict the club because they were not in sync with the group's ideas.
3. Disruptive influence: Another main concern was that the group would be disruptive. This claim is not necessarily fair as the group had not even begun to function properly, because they were not recognized by the college. The court explained that a test would need to be enacted to see if the groups would be a verbal advocacy group and or a advocacy plus physical actions group. The local SDS organization had no prior dangerous or physical acts on their record and they were just in the beginning stage of verbal advocacy. Therefore, this could not be a justification for non-recognition.
4. Prior affirmation of reasonable university rules: Lastly, the college's president made the argument that the group would act in a way that would go against the school's rules book. James claimed that in order for the group to be affirmed and recognized they needed to agree to follow the school rules prior to being recognized. The court explained that there are no such rules explicitly stated in the school's rule book that explains this requirement. Therefore, in the case of SDS they did not need to comply to be recognized.

== Decision ==
The decision in Healy was that the college classroom is a "market place of ideas" and therefore, the SDS organization should be recognized to the same extent that other clubs, and organizations are as CCSD. That being said, institutions are allowed to create requirements that do not go against the codified liberties and rights of the first amendment, that clubs and organizations need to agree to in advance before gaining recognition. Hence, if campus rules are abridged then clubs will be dealt with accordingly. But, in Healy, this was not the case as these rules were not explicitly established.

== Free speech implications ==
=== In educational institutions ===
- Universities must favor free expression over equality.
- Free speech and expression need to be valued and protected, the right to equality is also significant.
- University needs to be a place where students come to pursuit knowledge and truth.
- "True threat": serious expression that can obviously lead to violent actions and or behaviors.
- Constitutionally, universities can punish "true threats" without violating one's civil rights and liberties.
- E.g.: Telling a group of people that everyone who likes the color red is going to be eliminated is not considered a "true threat", but telling one person who is wearing red and actively argues that he/she likes the color red that they are going to eliminate is a "true threat".
- Basically it has to be obvious that a threat and action is intended following the speech.
- Universities and classes should be a market place of ideas.
- The United States Constitution was created to enact free speech and religion through the first amendment.
- Speech rights can not be protected if it's a threat (Schenck v United States).

== Tinker v. Des Moines Independent School District ==
Both Healy and Tinker v. Des Moines Independent School District are related court cases in the sense that they both adhere to student free speech in education institutions. Tinker is more concerned with free speech in K-12 education but has been cited and used in upper educational cases as precedent set. In Tinker students were suspended on the basis that their black arm bands in protest of the war in Vietnam, a form of symbolic speech, was a form of disruptive behavior and interfered with the school environment and learning space.The Supreme Court stated that students do not shed their right to the liberties of the first amendment including freedom of speech at the schoolhouse gate. Additionally, it was mentioned that the actions of the students to wear black armbands was not overly disruptive of the school environment and therefore, it was allowed. As Tinker applies to K-12 educational institutions, Healy applies more to higher educational institutions, following the precedent and framework set by Tinker. Therefore, the two cases are landmark cases in the realm of protecting student free speech in education institutions.

== Related cases ==
- Bethel School District No. 403 v. Fraser (1986)
- Hazelwood School District v. Kuhlmeier (1988)
- Schenck v. United States (1919) (not school related, but restrictions on free speech and expression and possible limits schools could adhere to)
- Mahanoy Area School District v. B.L. (2021)
