= Good-faith exception =

United States legal doctrine

In United States constitutional law and criminal procedure, the good-faith exception (also good-faith doctrine) is one of the limitations on the exclusionary rule of the Fourth Amendment.

For criminal proceedings, the exclusionary rule prohibits entry of evidence obtained through an unreasonable search and seizure, such as one executed under an invalid search warrant. However, the good-faith exemption allows evidence collected by law enforcement officers pursuant to a defective search warrant if the officers reasonably relied on the validity of the warrant in good faith (bona fides).

== Background ==
In the 1914 case Weeks v. United States, the U.S. Supreme Court prohibited the admissibility of evidence obtained through unreasonable searches or seizures in federal criminal prosecutions, thereby establishing the exclusionary rule. In 1961, the Court, then led by Chief Justice Earl Warren, ruled in Mapp v. Ohio that the exclusionary rule also applies to state criminal prosecutions under the doctrine of incorporation. In Mapp, the majority gave three rationales for enforcing the exclusionary rule under the Constitution: protecting a defendant's Fourth Amendment rights, promoting judicial integrity, and deterring improper searches and seizures.

However, the successor to Chief Justice Warren, Chief Justice Burger, was a vocal opponent of the exclusionary rule. In a series of cases, the Burger Court (1969–1986) effectively limited the applicability of the exclusionary rule to criminal trial processes.

== Jurisprudence of the exception ==
In 1984, the Supreme Court established the good-faith exception to the exclusionary rule in United States v. Leon and its companion case Massachusetts v. Sheppard. The Court reasoned that excluding evidence obtained through the police's good-faith reliance on a warrant issued by a neutral magistrate or judge that is later found to be deficient does not serve to deter any misconduct on the part of the police, and therefore such evidence is admissible. Said reasonableness of the reliance is determined under an objective standard. Furthermore, the Leon majority enumerated specific instances where the exception would not apply:

- Where the warrant was issued based on an affidavit containing intentionally or recklessly false information
- Where the magistrate or judge who issued the warrant was not neutral and detached from the case
- Where the warrant was issued based on an affidavit so clearly lacking support for probable cause
- Where the warrant was so clearly deficient, such as with respect to the location to be searched or objects to be seized

In Illinois v. Krull (1987), the Court extended the good-faith exception where an officer reasonably relied on a statute authorizing warrantless searches that was later found to be unconstitutional, citing the same lack of deterrent effect as Leon. The dissent argued that the majority improperly conflated searches which are authorized by judicial action and those which are authorized through legislation.

In Arizona v. Evans (1995), the Court held that evidence gathered because of a clerical error (here, a search warrant that was not properly removed from the police database) was admissible under the good-faith exception. The majority explained that the purpose of the exclusionary rule is to deter police misconduct, not punish mistakes made by court employees.

In Herring v. United States (2009), the Court considered whether the exception applied to evidence obtained because of a warrant that was not removed from a database because of a mistake by the police (unlike in Evans, where a court clerk made the error). The majority held that it did when the police mistake was due to a simple, isolated incident of negligence rather than systemic error or a deliberate or reckless disregard of constitutional requirements.

In Davis v. United States (2011), the Court ruled that evidence gathered from a search performed in reasonable reliance on binding appellate precedent that was later overruled as being unconstitutional (here, a vehicle search that was rendered unconstitutional in view of Arizona v. Gant) was admissible under the good-faith exception.

== Attempt at federal legislative codification ==
Prior to the decision of Arizona v. Evans, Representative Bill McCollum introduced the Exclusionary Rule Reform Act of 1995 (H.R. 666) to the House of the 104th Congress. The Act would have codified the ruling in United States v. Leon and expanded the good-faith exception to warrantless searches. Under the Act, evidence would be admissible as long as the officer had an objectively reasonable belief that their actions were constitutional at the time of the search. Opponents of the bill argued that this new test excessively broadened the scope of the good-faith exception by removing the requirement that the officer base their good-faith belief of constitutionality on an external authority (e.g., a neutral judge or magistrate, or a statute). Upon passing the House with a 289 - 142 vote, it ultimately did not progress through the Senate.

== Criticisms ==
The good-faith exception has been subject to significant criticism from civil rights groups and legal scholars. The American Civil Liberties Union has claimed that the exception enables dubious searches and limits the ability of defendants to contest the legality of a search. University of Tennessee Professor Thomas Y. Davies argues that Leon's objectively reasonable reliance test allows for evidence obtained from all but the most grossly deficient warrants, thereby obviating the Fourth Amendment's mandate that "no warrants shall issue, but upon probable cause", and that courts have commonly foregone performing an analysis as to the validity of a warrant in favor of simply applying the exception.

Herring v. United States, which held that negligent actions by the police in some circumstances may still fall under the good-faith exception, has also invited scrutiny. Prominent Fourth Amendment scholar Wayne LaFave argues that the degree of culpability (e.g., negligent vs. intentional) has not previously been within the calculus of deterring police misconduct, and that a constitutional violation does not merit less scrutiny because it was the result of merely negligent behavior.

== State law ==
The exclusionary rule was held enforceable against state governments by virtue of the Fourteenth Amendment in Mapp v. Ohio. Not all states, however, have adopted the federal good-faith exception as held in United States v. Leon.

=== States that recognize the good-faith exception ===
- Alabama
- Arizona
- Arkansas
- California
- Colorado
- Florida
- Illinois
- Indiana
- Kansas
- Kentucky
- Louisiana
- Maine
- Maryland
- Michigan
- Minnesota
- Mississippi
- Missouri
- Nebraska
- Nevada
- North Dakota
- Ohio
- Oklahoma
- Oregon
- South Carolina
- South Dakota
- Tennessee
- Texas
- Virginia
- Wisconsin
- Wyoming

=== States that do not recognize the good-faith exception ===
- Connecticut
- Delaware
- Georgia
- Hawaii
- Idaho
- Iowa
- Massachusetts
- New Hampshire
- New Jersey
- New Mexico
- New York
- North Carolina
- Pennsylvania
- Vermont
- Washington

=== States that have not decided whether to adopt the good-faith exception ===
- Alaska
- Montana
- Rhode Island
- Utah
- West Virginia

== See also ==
- Good faith (law)
- Sugar bowl (legal maxim)
- Fruit of the poisonous tree
- Parallel construction
- Taint (legal)
- Independent source doctrine
- Inevitable discovery
- Knock-and-announce
