= Inevitable discovery =

United States legal doctrine

Inevitable discovery is a doctrine in United States criminal procedure that permits admission of evidence that was obtained through illegal means if it would "inevitably" have been obtained regardless of the illegality. It is one of several exceptions to the exclusionary rule, or the related fruit-of-the-poisonous tree doctrine, which prevent evidence collected in violation of a defendant's constitutional rights from being admitted in court.

== Origin of the doctrine ==
=== Nix v. Williams ===
The inevitable discovery doctrine was first adopted by the United States Supreme Court in Nix v. Williams in 1984. In that case, Williams, the defendant, challenged the admissibility of evidence about the location and condition of the victim's body, given that it had been obtained from him in violation of his Sixth Amendment right to counsel. The Court held that the evidence was admissible because law enforcement would "inevitably" have discovered the body even without Williams' statements, because a massive search had been underway in the very location where the body was ultimately found. Prior to Nix v. Williams, an inevitable discovery rule had been recognized in the "vast majority" of both state and federal courts. In its opinion, the Court formally adopted the rule as part of its own jurisprudence.

=== Rationale for the doctrine ===
In adopting the inevitable discovery doctrine in Nix, the Supreme Court discussed the basic reasoning underlying the doctrine. The rationale behind the inevitable discovery exception is the flip side to that underlying the exclusionary rule—the exclusionary rule's purpose is to deter police from violating constitutional and statutory rights. In other words, it functions to make sure the police are not put in a better place than they would have been had they refrained from illegal conduct. At the same time, there are countervailing interests on the other side of the balance—most importantly, the public interest in having access to all probative evidence of a crime and not allowing guilty individuals to go free. The inevitable discovery doctrine gives force to that other side of the balance by rendering evidence admissible when it would simply put police in the same position they would have been in had they exclusively used lawful means. If the government can establish that the illegal act was irrelevant to its ability to ultimately obtain the evidence, then "the deterrence rationale has so little basis that the evidence should be received."

== Applicability of and limitations on the inevitable discovery doctrine ==
=== Burden and standard of proof ===
In Nix, the Court established that the prosecution bears the burden of establishing, by a preponderance of the evidence, that discovery of the evidence would have been inevitable.

The defendant had argued for the higher clear and convincing evidence standard, but the plaintiff explained that the preponderance of the evidence is the normal burden of proof applied when it comes to admissibility of evidence, and there was no reason to depart from that for inevitable discovery.

In dissent, Justice Brennan argued that even though only a preponderance of the evidence is required for the independent source rule to apply, that the government should have to present clear and convincing evidence to avail itself of the inevitable discovery exception. He pointed out that when the prosecution seeks to use the independent source exception, they have in fact, obtained the evidence by lawful means after having obtained it first by unlawful means. Meanwhile, with inevitable discovery, it is merely hypothetical whether the officers could have obtained the evidence by lawful means. Given the inherently speculative nature of inevitable discovery, Justice Brennan would have demanded that the prosecution satisfy a clear and convincing standard before being allowed to use the evidence. (See below for a more detailed discussion of the relationship between the inevitable discovery and independent source doctrines.)

=== Relevance of good/bad faith ===
The Court also took Nix as an opportunity to resolve a point of contention with regard to the relevance of bad faith to applicability of the inevitable discovery doctrine.

In the lower court proceedings in Nix, the Eighth Circuit had adopted a version of the rule that would require the state to not only show that the evidence would inevitably have been discovered, but also that the police did not act in bad faith, i.e., with the intention of committing misconduct. It reasoned that without an absence-of-bad-faith requirement (in other words, a "good faith" requirement), "the temptation to risk deliberate violations of the Sixth Amendment would be too great."

The Court rejected that view, holding that no showing of good faith is required for the state to take advantage of the inevitable discovery exception. The Court reasoned that it is unrealistic to think that a police officer faced with the possibility of obtaining evidence illegally would, in the moment, make the calculation of whether a court would conclude that the evidence would have been inevitably discovered; it also noted that the risk of civil liability and departmental discipline would also disincentivize police from engaging in such misconduct.

=== Applicability to primary vs. derivative evidence ===
Nix itself concerned the admissibility of "derivative evidence," or evidence that was not the direct result of an illegal act, but that was the product of a chain of events beginning with the illegal act—also known as "fruit of the poisonous tree." Evidence that was directly obtained via the illegal act is referred to as "primary evidence."

The Court in Nix did not make explicit whether the inevitable discovery doctrine applied to just derivative evidence or primary evidence as well, and in the years immediately following Nix, the lower courts diverged greatly on this issue. In 1988, however, the Supreme Court held in Murray v. United States that the related independent source exception applies to not only derivative but also primary, evidence. Since then, most lower courts have held that the inevitable discovery doctrine also applies to both primary and derivative evidence. A few, however, have maintained that the inevitable discovery doctrine does not extend to evidence obtained directly as a result of the unconstitutional act—for example, in United States v. Polanco, the Ninth Circuit interpreted Nix as implying that the inevitable discovery doctrine does not "allow admission of the unconstitutional inculpatory statement itself."

=== Debate over active pursuit requirement ===
There is a split among the lower federal courts as to whether the inevitable discovery doctrine can only be applied when the investigation that inevitably would have led to the discovery was already underway when the illegality occurred or whether the government's claim that they would have initiated such an investigation is sufficient. For instance, the Eighth Circuit has required that "the government was actively pursuing a substantial, alternative line of investigation at the time of the constitutional violation" for the exception to apply. Meanwhile, the Tenth Circuit has established that "the inevitable discovery exception applies whenever an independent investigation inevitably would have led to discovery of the evidence, whether or not the investigation was ongoing at the time of the illegal police conduct." In the Tenth Circuit case of United States v. Cunningham, the defendant objected that evidence obtained from his house indicating that he was guilty of counterfeit check-writing should be suppressed because the police had no warrant and his consent to the search was coerced. Even though the police were not in the process of getting a warrant at the time of the search (they had abandoned plans to obtain a warrant in favor of continuing surveillance), the court held that the officers inevitably would have been able to obtain a warrant to search the house and thus, were entitled to the exception.

=== Routine vs. non-routine investigatory procedures ===
Lower federal courts have most readily applied the inevitable discovery doctrine in cases where the means the police claim would have inevitably led to the evidence are routine procedures, like an inventory search. For example, in United States v. Almeida, the defendant objected that the counterfeit bills seized from his wallet were the product of an illegal search; the First Circuit concluded that the bills would inevitably have been discovered according to routine procedure, as the defendant had already been arrested for presenting false identification and it was the jail's standard practice to remove and fully search any arrestee's possessions. And in United States v. Melgar, the Fourth Circuit held that even though the defendant had revealed his illegal alien status in an interrogation that violated his Sixth Amendment right to counsel, the government would inevitably have discovered his illegal status via a routine computer check on his false identification card.

More difficult cases arise when law enforcement claims that they would have come across the evidence via a non-routine investigatory procedure. For instance, in United States v. Infante-Ruiz, the defendant sought to suppress evidence of a firearm that officers had found while searching a briefcase in the trunk of a rental car he was a passenger in, after arresting him on outstanding, unrelated narcotics charges. The First Circuit held that the police would not have inevitably discovered the firearm because there was no routine or policy of seizing and searching a rental car in which the arrestee was merely a passenger.

=== Applicability across amendments ===
Most commonly, the inevitable discovery doctrine is used to bring in evidence despite an illegal search or seizure in violation of the Fourth Amendment. But it may also may apply to unconstitutional conduct in violation of the Fifth Amendment right against self-incrimination or the Sixth Amendment right to counsel. Nix itself was a Sixth Amendment case, but the Supreme Court did not suggest in any way that the inevitable discovery doctrine was limited to the Sixth Amendment, and lower courts quickly extended the holding to both the Fourth and Fifth Amendments.

== Relationship to the independent source exception ==
In Nix, the Court adopted not only the inevitable discovery doctrine but also the closely related independent source doctrine. That doctrine provides that evidence obtained through illegal means may still be admissible if it was also obtained through independent, legal means. The difference between an independent source and an inevitable discovery is that the former focuses on what actually happened, while the latter focuses on a hypothetical counterfactual. Under the independent source rule, police did in fact "rel[y] upon an untainted source" (in addition to the tainted one), while under the inevitable discovery doctrine, the theory is that police would inevitably have been able to find an untainted source.

An illustration of the difference between the two is captured in the case of Somer v. United States. There, federal agents conducted an illegal search of the defendant's apartment in violation of the Fourth Amendment and learned from his wife that he was out but would be back shortly. Acting on that information, they waited out on the curb for the defendant, and when he arrived, they smelled an alcoholic odor on his breath, arrested him, and legally searched the car, uncovering illicit alcohol. The Court held that the independent source exception could not apply, as the only reason why police decided to wait outside and then conduct their legal search of their car was because of the information they had learned via their illegal search; thus, their claimed legal means were not truly independent of the illegal means. Nonetheless, the Court noted that the evidence may still be admissible if the government were able to show that "independently of what Somer's wife told them, the officers would have gone to the street, waited for Somer, and arrested him, exactly as they did"—in other words, if in a counterfactual world, they would have inevitably discovered the contraband anyway.

The independent source rule dates all the way back to the Supreme Court's 1920 case of Silverthorne Lumber Co. v. United States, well before the adoption of the inevitable discovery doctrine. But in Nix, the Court explicitly noted that the rationale underlying the independent source rule—balancing competing interests by putting police in the same, not a worse, position that they would have been in absent the illegality–applied with equal force to justify the inevitable discovery exception.

== Application in state court ==
In addition to federal courts, every state other than Texas and Washington recognizes some version of the inevitable discovery doctrine. But the states vary in how closely they follow the federal standard set out in Nix and the specific requirements they impose for application of the doctrine.

For example, Alaska has required that the prosecution be able "to prove exactly how" the evidence would have been discovered, and that the defendant would have been asked the same questions and would have given the same answers. And Arizona has held that the inevitable discovery doctrine cannot be applied to the illegal search and seizure of items from a private home.

Some states have declined to follow the Supreme Court's prescription in Nix that good faith is not a prerequisite to applicability of the doctrine. Others have held that the inevitable discovery exception only applies to derivative evidence and cannot be used to bring in primary evidence obtained illegally.

Most states have followed the Supreme Court's lead on the standard of proof and applied the preponderance of the evidence standard to inevitable discovery. But some states have chosen to impose the more rigorous, clear and convincing standard, siding with Justice Brennan's dissent in Nix. The Hawaii Supreme Court explained this choice of a higher standard of proof as a product of the fact that its state constitution provides greater protection for individual privacy than does the federal constitution; thus, the Hawaii Supreme Court wanted to ensure that "speculation regarding whether evidence obtained in violation of one's individual privacy would have been inevitably discovered be 'as close to correct as possible.'"

In Mobley v. State, the Georgia Supreme Court highlighted the way in which the inevitable discovery doctrine might interact with the increasing breadth of state protections against unreasonable search and seizure in the digital context. In that case, officers seized data from the defendant's car system, which revealed that he had been driving at nearly 100 miles per hour and was likely responsible for the deaths of the two people in the car with which he collided. They did not obtain a warrant for the data until after the fact. The Georgia Supreme Court held that the police violated the Fourth Amendment by failing to get a warrant before accessing the vehicle's data and that the inevitable discovery doctrine did not apply: it reasoned that the police had not shown any indication of plans to get a warrant before the data was removed and that the police department had no policy or practice of obtaining such data after a fatal crash.

== Criticisms of the doctrine ==
Various scholars and practitioners have criticized the inevitable discovery doctrine and its sister exceptions as undermining the constitutional protections embodied by the exclusionary rule.

Many have argued that, despite the Court's assurances to the contrary in Nix, the inevitable discovery rule not only permits but encourages, law enforcement to engage in misconduct by, for example, creating an easy "I could have gotten a warrant" excuse for a warrantless search. Professor Robert Bloom critiques the Nix Court as having improperly minimized the "negative effect that the inevitable discovery exception would have on the deterrence rationale of the exclusionary rule"; he posited that the Supreme Court neglected the immense incentives the exception would create to conduct unconstitutional searches and seizures in the Fourth Amendment context because Nix itself is a Sixth Amendment case.

These scholars have especially emphasized how the expansion of the inevitable discovery doctrine to primary evidence and the lack of an active pursuit rule in some circuits have rendered it a more dangerous threat to constitutional rights. Bloom warns that application of the doctrine to primary evidence "could well signal the de facto elimination of the exclusionary rule." One state court judge has opined that the Supreme Court was wrong in Nix to reject the lower court's requirement that the officers have acted in good faith, positing that "a good faith requirement would curtail constitutional abuse" and "would exclude evidence obtained via willful violations" without "punish[ing] officers acting honestly." But others have suggested that at least some of the conservative members of the Court would be happy to see the elimination of the exclusionary rule, with Nix and the inevitable discovery doctrine as merely examples of a longstanding distaste for the exclusionary rule.

Other commentators have expressed concern that the inevitable discovery doctrine might undercut new Fourth Amendment protections the Supreme Court has established to account for changes in technology, in cases such as United States v. Jones, Riley v. California, and Carpenter v. United States. Mark Rasch has argued that the Supreme Court's ruling in Carpenter, requiring law enforcement to get a warrant to access cell-site location information (data about what cell towers a phone has pinged), has been rendered meaningless by a combination of the good-faith exception and the inevitable discovery doctrine. He observes that as long as the government can argue that they inevitably would have been able to uncover an individual's data by subpoenaing them from a cell-phone provider or other third-party entity, then inevitable discovery will provide a convenient loophole around modern Fourth Amendment protections.
