= Herring v. United States =

- Supreme Court of the United States

Argued October 7, 2008 Decided January 14, 2009
- Full case name: Bennie Dean Herring, Plaintiff, v. United States of America
- Docket no.: 07-513
- Citations: 555 U.S. 135 (more) 129 S. Ct. 695; 172 L. Ed. 2d 496; 2009 U.S. LEXIS 581

Case history
- Prior: Motion to suppress evidence denied, United States v. Herring, 451 F. Supp. 2d 1290 (M.D. Ala. 2005); defendant convicted; affirmed, 492 F.3d 1212 (11th Cir. 2007); cert. granted, 552 U.S. 1178 (2008).
- Subsequent: Rehearing denied, 556 U.S. 1161 (2009).

Holding
- Evidence obtained after illegal searches or arrests based on simple police mistakes that are not the result of repeated patterns or flagrant misconduct cannot have the exclusionary rule used to suppress evidence.

Court membership
- Chief Justice John Roberts Associate Justices John P. Stevens · Antonin Scalia; Anthony Kennedy · David Souter; Clarence Thomas · Ruth Bader Ginsburg; Stephen Breyer · Samuel Alito

Case opinions
- Majority: Roberts, joined by Scalia, Kennedy, Thomas, Alito
- Dissent: Ginsburg, joined by Stevens, Souter, Breyer
- Dissent: Breyer, joined by Souter

Laws applied
- U.S. Const. amend. IV

Herring v. United States, 555 U.S. 135 (2009), was a case decided by the Supreme Court of the United States on January 14, 2009. The court decided that the good-faith exception to the exclusionary rule applies when a police officer makes an arrest based on an outstanding warrant in another jurisdiction, but the information regarding that warrant is later found to be incorrect because of a negligent error by that agency.

== Background ==
=== The evolution of the exclusionary rule ===
"The Fourth Amendment contains no provision expressly precluding the use of evidence obtained in violation of its commands," but in Weeks v. United States (1914) and Mapp v. Ohio (1961), the Supreme Court created the exclusionary rule, which generally operates to suppress – i.e. prevent the introduction at trial of – evidence obtained in violation of Constitutional rights. "Suppression of evidence, however, has always been [the court's] last resort, not [its] first impulse. The exclusionary rule generates substantial social costs, which sometimes include setting the guilty free and the dangerous at large." In United States v. Leon, the Supreme Court clarified that the exclusionary rule "operates as a judicially created remedy designed to safeguard Fourth Amendment rights generally through its deterrent effect, rather than a personal constitutional right of the party aggrieved." Application of the rule should be sensitive to this purpose, the court said: If suppression "does not result in appreciable deterrence," the court had said, "its use ... is unwarranted."

Thus, for example, in Leon itself, the court concluded that the fruits of a search based on a search warrant later found defective should not be excluded because the rule's deterrent purpose "will only rarely be served by applying it in such circumstances," and in Arizona v. Evans, the court concluded that the fruits of a search based on an arrest warrant that was no longer valid, but that was still listed in the police system because of an error by the issuing court's clerk, should not be excluded because such exclusion would have no deterrent effect.

=== The beginnings of the Herring case ===
Bennie Herring drove to the Coffee County, Alabama, sheriff's department to check on a pickup truck that had been impounded. Mark Anderson, an investigator with the Coffee County Sheriff's Department, asked the department's warrant clerk to check for any outstanding warrants; the warrant clerk in the neighboring Dale County Sheriff's Department was contacted, and advised that there was an outstanding warrant. Within fifteen minutes, the Dale County clerk called back to warn the Coffee County sheriff's department that there had been a clerical mistake: the warrant had been recalled five months prior. But it was too late; Anderson had already arrested Herring and searched his vehicle, discovering firearms and methamphetamine.

Herring was indicted in the United States District Court for the Middle District of Alabama for violations of 18 U.S.C. § 922(g)(1) (felon in possession of a firearm) and 21 U.S.C. § 844(a) (possession of a controlled substance, viz. methamphetamine) and invoked the exclusionary rule to have both the firearm and drug evidence suppressed. He claimed that the arrest was unlawful as a result of an invalid/recalled warrant ("failure to appear", issued by neighboring Dale County, Alabama), a motion denied by the trial court. He was convicted, and sentenced to 27 months in federal prison. The United States Court of Appeals for the Eleventh Circuit affirmed, ruling—based on Leon—that the evidence was admissible because the mistake was made by the Dale County officials, not the Coffee County police. Because the error was corrected in a very short time, there was no evidence that the Dale County Sheriff's Department had problems disposing of recalled warrants, and thus no negligence could be claimed because of the lack of a pattern of disposal problems.

The Supreme Court of the United States granted certiorari on February 19, 2008. The case was argued before the Court on October 7, 2008.

== Result ==
In a 5–4 decision hewing to Leon and Evans, the Court, speaking through Chief Justice Roberts, affirmed the trial court and the Eleventh Circuit. While noting that there had not necessarily been a constitutional violation in the case, the Court accepted for the sake of argument Herring's contention that there had been. On that stipulation, the court held that the exclusionary rule did not apply to a search that resulted from isolated and attenuated police negligence, holding that "[t]o trigger the exclusionary rule, police conduct must be sufficiently deliberate that exclusion can meaningfully deter it, and sufficiently culpable that such deterrence is worth the price paid by the justice system." Suppression was unwarranted because an error in recordkeeping—not flagrant or deliberate misconduct—led to Herring's arrest. The Court also warned that it was not "suggest[ing] that all recordkeeping errors by the police are immune from the exclusionary rule. ... If the police have been shown to be reckless in maintaining a warrant system, or to have knowingly made false entries to lay the groundwork for future false arrests, exclusion would certainly be justified under our cases should such misconduct cause a Fourth Amendment violation." Nevertheless, in the case at bar, "the [police] conduct at issue was not so objectively culpable as to require exclusion." "[W]hen police mistakes are the result of negligence such as that described here, rather than systemic error or reckless disregard of constitutional requirements," the Chief Justice wrote, "any marginal deterrence does not 'pay its way.'"

Justice Ginsburg dissented, joined by Justices Stevens, Souter, and Breyer. She wrote that "the exclusionary rule provides redress for Fourth Amendment violations by placing the government in the position it would have been in had there been no unconstitutional arrest and search. The rule thus strongly encourages police compliance with the Fourth Amendment in the future." The prosecution had contested the unlawful case in court because of contraband found on Herring's person and in his vehicle, but, Ginsburg wrote, narrowing the scope of the exclusionary rule would most typically hurt innocent persons who are wrongfully arrested.

== Reaction ==
Writing shortly after the decision, SCOTUSblog author Tom Goldstein stated that the decision was of "surpassing significance"; but law professor and Fourth Amendment expert Orin Kerr suggested Goldstein was reading too much into the case, writing that Herring was best seen as "a narrow and interstitial decision, not one that is rocking the boat. ... I don't see it as suggesting a general good faith exception for police conduct ... [which is] why the dissenters didn't sound the alarm...." Around two weeks later, The New York Times' Adam Liptak expressed concern that the decision was a step towards overruling Mapp.

Eight years later, a 2016 paper in the Journal of Criminal Law & Criminology concluded that "Herring invited evidence laundering by police and laid the groundwork for judicial approval of this practice", based on a case law examination of how state courts and lower federal courts had applied the Supreme Court decision since 2009.

== See also ==
- Fruit of the poisonous tree
- Parallel construction
