= Brown v. Illinois =

- Supreme Court of the United States

Argued March 18, 1975 Decided June 26, 1975
- Full case name: Richard Brown v. State of Illinois
- Citations: 422 U.S. 590 (more) 95 S. Ct. 2254; 45 L. Ed. 2d 416

Case history
- Prior: People v. Brown, 56 Ill. 2d 312, 307 N.E.2d 356 (1974); cert. granted, 419 U.S. 894 (1974).

Holding
- Miranda warnings do not automatically purge the taint of an unlawful arrest. A court must examine the time between the arrest of a suspect and the suspect's confession, any intervening circumstances, and the purpose and the flagrancy of official misconduct when determining if the confession of a properly Mirandized but illegally arrested suspect may be admitted as evidence.

Court membership
- Chief Justice Warren E. Burger Associate Justices William O. Douglas · William J. Brennan Jr. Potter Stewart · Byron White; Thurgood Marshall · Harry Blackmun; Lewis F. Powell Jr. · William Rehnquist

Case opinions
- Majority: Blackmun, joined by Burger, Douglas, Brennan, Stewart, Marshall
- Concurrence: White
- Concurrence: Powell, joined by Rehnquist

Brown v. Illinois, 422 U.S. 590 (1975), was a case in which the Supreme Court of the United States held that the Fourth Amendment's protection against the introduction of evidence obtained in an illegal arrest is not attenuated by reading the defendant their Miranda Rights.

== History ==
On May 13, 1968, Richard Brown was arrested outside his Chicago, IL. apartment by two members of the Chicago Police. The two officers, William Nolan and William Lenz, entered Mr. Brown's apartment without probable cause later testifying that they had entered to question Brown concerning the death of Roger Corpus, who had been killed a week prior.

Following his arrest, Mr. Brown was taken to a police station for interrogation; prior to beginning his interrogation, Mr. Brown was read his Miranda Rights. During interrogation Mr. Brown produced a two-page written document acknowledging his role in the killing of Roger Corpus. Mr. Brown would later give another statement to the Assistant State's Attorney assigned to the case again acknowledging his role in Mr. Corpus' death but also containing a number of factual inaccuracies. Both statements would later be introduced at trial, ultimately resulting in Mr. Brown's conviction for the murder of Roger Corpus.

On review, the Illinois Supreme Court held that by giving Mr. Brown Miranda Warnings, the causal chain between the illegal arrest and statements obtained had been broken, and the statements were thus the result of free will.

== Decision ==
In the case syllabus, the US Supreme Court sums up its holding in three parts:

1. "The Illinois courts erred in adopting a per se rule that Miranda warnings in and of themselves broke the causal chain so that any subsequent statement, even one induced by the continuing effects of unconstitutional custody, was admissible so long as, in the traditional sense, it was voluntary and not coerced in violation of the Fifth and Fourteenth Amendments."
2. "The question whether a confession is voluntary under Wong Sun must be answered on the facts of each case."
3. "The State failed to sustain its burden in this case of showing that petitioner's statements were admissible under Wong Sun."

Writing for a unanimous court, Justice Blackmun held that reading a defendant their Miranda Rights does not remove the taint of an illegal arrest. The Court acknowledges that under Wong Sun statements and evidence obtained from an illegal search can be admissible if the connection between the search and the evidence is so attenuated that the taint is dissipated. However, the Supreme Court held that attenuation under Wong Sun requires a showing on the facts of the individual case. Allowing Miranda Rights to automatically attenuate an illegal search would dilute the exclusionary rule.

Under the attenuation doctrine, evidence obtained through government misconduct is admissible if "the connection between the misconduct and the discovery of the evidence is attenuated —weakened— so as to make the evidence untainted by the government's conduct." Because there was no intervening event in the two hours between Mr. Brown's illegal arrest and the first statement that he made, the trial court erred in admitting it. Similarly, as the second statement was a direct result of the first statement, it too is inadmissible.

== See also ==
- Wong Sun v. United States, 371 U.S. 471 (1963)
- Utah v. Strieff
- Fruit of the Poisonous Tree
