= California v. Hodari D. =

- Supreme Court of the United States

Argued January 14, 1991 Decided April 23, 1991
- Full case name: California v. Hodari D.
- Docket no.: 89-1632
- Citations: 499 U.S. 621 (more) 111 S. Ct. 1547; 113 L. Ed. 2d 690; 1991 U.S. LEXIS 2397; 59 U.S.L.W. 4335; 91 Cal. Daily Op. Service 2893; 91 Daily Journal DAR 4665
- Argument: Oral argument

Case history
- Prior: Certiorari to the Court of Appeal of California, First Appellate District

Holding
- During police pursuits, a fleeing suspect is not seized unless (1) pursuing officers apply physical force to the suspect or (2) the suspect submits to shows of authority

Court membership
- Chief Justice William Rehnquist Associate Justices Byron White · Thurgood Marshall; Harry Blackmun · John P. Stevens; Sandra Day O'Connor · Antonin Scalia; Anthony Kennedy · David Souter

Case opinions
- Majority: Scalia, joined by Rehnquist, White, Blackmun, O'Connor, Kennedy, Souter
- Dissent: Stevens, joined by Marshall

Laws applied
- U.S. Const. amend. IV

California v. Hodari D., 499 U.S. 621 (1991), was a United States Supreme Court case where the Court held that a fleeing suspect is not "seized" under the terms of the Fourth Amendment unless the pursuing officers apply physical force to the suspect or the suspect submits to officers' demands to halt. Consequently, evidence that is discarded by a fleeing suspect prior to the point in time at which they are seized is not subject to the Fourth Amendment's exclusionary rule.

== Background ==
In April 1988, police officers on patrol (Note: The officers drove in an unmarked car in street clothes, but wore jackets embossed with the word "Police" on the front and back.) in Oakland, California encountered "four or five youths huddled around a small red car." When the youths saw the officers' car approaching, the youths "panicked" and ran down the street. Hodari D. and a companion ran west through an alley, while the others fled south. One of the officers chased Hodari D. on foot down an adjoining street, while the other officer chased another youth in the car on a different street. Although Hodari D. "[looked] behind as he ran," he did not see the officer until the officer "was almost upon him, whereupon he tossed away what appeared to be a small rock." A moment later, the officer tackled and handcuffed Hodari D. and placed a radio call for assistance. The rock Hodari D. discarded was later found to be crack cocaine.

=== Juvenile court proceedings ===
During proceedings in juvenile court, Hodari D. moved to suppress the rock of cocaine. He argued that officers conducted an unlawful seizure when officers began running toward him and that the evidence was inadmissible because it was obtained in violation of his Fourth Amendment rights. The juvenile court denied the motion but on appeal, the California Court of Appeal ruled in favor of Hodari D., concluding that Hodari D. was unlawfully seized at the moment officers began the chase. The California Supreme Court denied California's petition for review, but the Supreme Court of the United States granted certiorari on October 1, 1990.

== Opinion of the Court ==
Writing for a 7-2 majority, Justice Antonin Scalia held that the discarded rock of crack cocaine was admissible because Hodari D. was not seized until he was tackled by officers, and he discarded the contraband before he was seized by officers. Justice Scalia concluded that under the Fourth Amendment, seizure traditionally meant "taking possession" of the person or thing being seized. He noted that "at common law, the word connoted not merely grasping, or applying physical force to, the animate or inanimate object in question, but actually bringing it within physical control." Consequently, he held that a seizure does not occur unless officers apply force to a fleeing suspect or the fleeing suspect yields to an officer's "show of authority" in which the officer orders the fleeing suspect to halt. In other words, a seizure occurs upon the application of physical force by officers or a submission to an officer's assertion of authority. Justice Scalia ruled that Hodari D. was not seized until he was tackled, and the rock of cocaine was therefore "abandoned" property that was not obtained as a result of an unlawful seizure.

=== Dissenting opinion of Justice Stevens ===
Justice John Paul Stevens wrote a dissenting opinion in which he criticized the majority's "narrow construction" of seizures under the Fourth Amendment. Additionally, Justice Stevens criticized the potential consequences of the majority's opinion, writing that the majority "assumes, without acknowledging, that a police officer may now fire his weapon at an innocent citizen and not implicate the Fourth Amendment—as long as he misses his target." He argued that the majority's interpretation of the word "seizure" was a radical departure from the Court's earlier Fourth Amendment jurisprudence and that the officers' demands to halt "adequately conveyed the message that respondent was not free to leave."

== See also ==
- Commonwealth v. Matos (1996)
- Torres v. Madrid (2021)
- List of United States Supreme Court cases, volume 499
- List of United States Supreme Court cases
- Lists of United States Supreme Court cases by volume
- List of United States Supreme Court cases by the Rehnquist Court
