= Commonwealth v. Matos =

- Court: Pennsylvania Supreme Court
- Full case name: Commonwealth of Pennsylvania v. Danny Matos
- Decided: February 26, 1996
- Citation: 543 Pa. 449, 672 A.2d 769

Case history
- Prior actions: 427 Pa. Super. 43, 628 A.2d 419 (1993), 427 Pa. Super. 45, 628 A.2d 420 (1993), 427 Pa. Super. 1, 628 A.ed 398 (1993) Upholding trial court convictions for drug offenses.
- Subsequent action: none

Court membership
- Judges sitting: Nix C.J. and Flaherty, Zappala, Cappy, Castille JJ.

Case opinions
- Where police possess neither probable cause nor reasonable suspicion, contraband discarded by a person fleeing a police officer are the fruits of an illegal seizure under the greater privacy protections of the Pennsylvania Constitution.

Commonwealth v. Matos, 672 A.2d 769 (1996), is a Pennsylvania State Supreme Court case which further developed Pennsylvania Constitutional Law as affording greater privacy protections than those guaranteed by the Fourth Amendment to the United States Constitution. Specifically, where police possess neither probable cause nor reasonable suspicion, contraband discarded by a person fleeing a police officer are the fruits of an illegal seizure. The case departs from the ruling of California v. Hodari D., 499 U.S. 621 (1991), which held that fleeing suspects cannot be considered seized for purposes of the U.S. Constitution. It is a part of a family of state case law concerning the phenomenon of "new judicial federalism." Pennsylvania criminal defense attorneys may cite the case as part of a motion to suppress physical evidence where the defendant discards drugs, weapons, or other contraband while fleeing police.

== Facts of the case ==
The Pennsylvania Supreme Court consolidated three cases for its ruling.

=== Matos v. Commonwealth ===
Police responded to a radio call that unknown persons were selling narcotics. When police arrived on scene, three males including appellant Matos, fled as the officers approached. During the chase, Matos discarded a plastic bag containing cocaine. The Court of Common Pleas of Philadelphia County suppressed the drug evidence and the Superior Court reversed.

=== McFadden v. Commonwealth ===
Police approached appellant McFadden in a patrol car. McFadden looked in their direction and ran. The Officers chased McFadden who discarded a firearm into some bushes before the arrest. The Court of Common Pleas of Philadelphia County suppressed the evidence of the handgun at trial and the Superior Court reversed.

=== Carroll v. Commonwealth ===
Police saw two men standing on the sidewalk. Officers approached to speak with the two men while appellant Carroll stood with his hands inside his jacket pockets. Police asked Carroll to remove his hands from his pockets and Carroll turned and fled. Carrol ran into an alley, but tripped and fell. Packets of cocaine fell from his pockets. Carroll was arrested and a search incident to arrest yielded more cocaine. The Court of Common Pleas of Philadelphia County suppressed the drug evidence and the Superior Court reversed.

== Ruling of the Supreme Court ==
=== Issue presented ===
The court considered whether pursuit by a police officer constituted a seizure for purposes of Article I, Section 8 of the Pennsylvania Constitution. The Supreme Court of the United States had ruled that it did not for purposes of the Fourth Amendment to the U.S. Constitution. The court considered the question of whether to extend greater protective rights under state law for the same issue.

=== State courts not bound by the decisions of the U.S. Supreme Court ===
The Pennsylvania Supreme Court followed the decision in Commonwealth v. Edmunds, which outlined a four-pronged test for state constitutional issues. Edmunds rejected the federal "good faith exception" to the exclusionary rule of United States v. Leon, 468 U.S. 897 (1984) and established four factors which must be addressed whenever a legal issue implicates the state constitution:

- The text of the state constitutional provision,
- The provision's history including relevant case law,
- Related case law from other states, and
- State and local policy considerations.

Under the first and second factors, the court noted that the Pennsylvania equivalent to the Fourth Amendment was actually older, having originated with clause 10 of the original Constitution of 1776, and remaining unchanged for over 200 years. The court recognized that the exclusionary rule under Pennsylvania law went further than the U.S. Constitution. Where federal protection was meant solely to deter police misconduct, state protection was "unshakably linked to a right of privacy in [the] Commonwealth."

== Application and citing references ==
=== Followed ===
- In re M.D., 781 A.2d 192, 197 (Pa.Super. 2001)
- Commonwealth v. Key 789 A.2d 282 (Pa. Super. 2001), appeal denied 569 Pa. 701 (2002).
- In re J.G., 860 A.2d 185 (Pa. Super. 2004).

=== Distinguished ===
- Commonwealth v. Cook, 558 Pa. 50 (1999)
- In re D.M., 566 Pa. 445 (2001), adopting Illinois v. Wardlow, 528 U.S. 119 (2000)
- Commonwealth v. Jefferson, 853 A.2d 404 (Pa. Super. 2004)
- Commonwealth v. Miller, 876 A.2d 427 (Pa. Super. 2005), appeal denied, 889 A.2d 1214 (Pa. 2005).
