= Leon v. United States =

Leon v. United States may refer to:

- Leon v. United States (1966), a United States Supreme Court case
- United States v. Leon (1984)
