= List of United States Supreme Court cases, volume 422 =

This is a list of all the United States Supreme Court cases from volume 422 of the United States Reports:

Case name	Citation	Date decided
Intercounty Constr. Corp. v. Walter	422 U.S. 1	1975
United States v. Louisiana (1975)	422 U.S. 13	1975
Rogers v. United States	422 U.S. 35	1975
Rondeau v. Mosinee Paper Corp.	422 U.S. 49	1975
Cort v. Ash	422 U.S. 66	1975
United States v. Citizens & S. Nat'l Bank	422 U.S. 86	1975
Twentieth Century Music Corp. v. Aiken	422 U.S. 151	1975
United States v. Hale	422 U.S. 171	1975
United States v. Alaska	422 U.S. 184	1975
Erznoznik v. City of Jacksonville	422 U.S. 205	1975
United States v. Nobles	422 U.S. 225	1975
FAA v. Robertson	422 U.S. 255	1975
United States v. Am. Building Maintenance Industries	422 U.S. 271	1975
Aberdeen & Rockfish R. Co. v. Students Challenging Regulatory Agency Procedures (SCRAP)	422 U.S. 289	1975
Hicks v. Miranda	422 U.S. 332	1975
Richmond v. United States	422 U.S. 358	1975
Roe v. Norton	422 U.S. 391	1975
Preiser v. Newkirk	422 U.S. 395	1975
Albemarle Paper Co. v. Moody	422 U.S. 405	1975
Muniz v. Hoffman	422 U.S. 454	1975
Warth v. Seldin	422 U.S. 490	1975
United States v. Peltier	422 U.S. 531	1975
The exclusionary rule is not applicable when an officer relied on a statute subsequently ruled unconstitutional.
O'Connor v. Donaldson	422 U.S. 563	1975
Brown v. Illinois	422 U.S. 590	1975
Ivan Allen Co. v. United States	422 U.S. 617	1975
Gordon v. N.Y. Stock Exch., Inc.	422 U.S. 659	1975
United States v. Nat'l Ass'n of Sec. Dealers, Inc.	422 U.S. 694	1975
Weinberger v. Salfi	422 U.S. 749	1975
Faretta v. California	422 U.S. 806	1975
Herring v. New York	422 U.S. 853	1975
United States v. Brignoni-Ponce	422 U.S. 873	1975
United States v. Ortiz	422 U.S. 891	1975
Bowen v. United States	422 U.S. 916	1975
Doran v. Salem Inn, Inc.	422 U.S. 922	1975
White v. Regester	422 U.S. 935	1975
Hill v. Printing Industries	422 U.S. 937	1975
