= Carnival Cruise Lines, Inc. v. Shute =

- Supreme Court of the United States

Argued January 15, 1991 Decided April 17, 1991
- Full case name: Carnival Cruise Lines, Incorporated v. Eulala Shute, et vir.
- Citations: 499 U.S. 585 (more) 111 S. Ct. 1522; 113 L. Ed. 2d 622; 1991 U.S. LEXIS 2221; 59 U.S.L.W. 4323; 1991 AMC 1697; 91 Cal. Daily Op. Service 2729; 91 Daily Journal DAR 4419

Case history
- Prior: Shute v. Carnival Cruise Lines, 897 F.2d 377 (9th Cir. 1988); cert. granted, 498 U.S. 807 (1990).

Holding
- Federal courts will enforce forum selection clauses so long as the clause is deemed fundamentally fair.

Court membership
- Chief Justice William Rehnquist Associate Justices Byron White · Thurgood Marshall; Harry Blackmun · John P. Stevens; Sandra Day O'Connor · Antonin Scalia; Anthony Kennedy · David Souter

Case opinions
- Majority: Blackmun, joined by Rehnquist, White, O'Connor, Scalia, Kennedy, Souter
- Dissent: Stevens, joined by Marshall

Laws applied
- Forum selection clause

Carnival Cruise Lines, Inc. v. Shute, 499 U.S. 585 (1991), was a case in which the Supreme Court held that United States federal courts will enforce forum selection clauses so long as the clause is not unreasonably burdensome to the party seeking to escape it.

== Background ==
The plaintiffs, Eulala and Russel Shute, were passengers on a cruise ship operated by the defendant, Carnival Cruise Lines, Inc. The Shutes had bought tickets in Washington and signed a contract, with a forum selection clause mandating that injured parties would sue in Florida, to the exclusion of all other jurisdictions. The plaintiffs boarded the cruise ship in California, and one was injured in international waters off the coast of Mexico. The plaintiffs then filed a lawsuit in Washington, in violation of the contract clause.

The defendant sought summary judgment based on:

1. the forum selection clause, and
2. a lack of minimum contacts between the defendant and the forum state

The trial court dismissed based solely on the lack of sufficient contacts. The United States Court of Appeals for the Ninth Circuit reversed because the cruise line had reached into Washington via advertising, and held that but for the defendant's solicitation, there would be no cause of action. The Court of Appeals also held that forum selection clause was void because of unequal bargaining power between the parties, and because it would be an undue hardship for the Shutes to have to go all the way to Florida to sue. This decision was appealed to the Supreme Court based on the Court's Admiralty jurisdiction.

== Opinion of the Court ==
The Court, in an opinion by Justice Blackmun, held that forum selection clauses were generally enforceable in federal courts so long as they are "fundamentally fair", and that therefore the Shutes were held to the contract printed on the back of their ticket. The Court noted that Florida is not a random jurisdiction - Carnival is headquartered there and does much business there, and Washington does not necessarily make sense in the context of an accident off the coast of Mexico on a ship that left from California. The hardship on the plaintiffs mattered little, as they had bought the ticket, and no one forced them to go on a cruise. On the other hand, it made sense for the cruise industry, which carries passengers from all over, to have a single forum for lawsuits. The cruise line will thereby avoid defending itself in many different courts, which will save money, which the Court believes will translate to cheaper tickets.

=== Dissent ===
Justice Stevens filed a dissenting opinion, joined by Justice Marshall. Justice Stevens had several reasons for dissenting, including objections to contracts of adhesion created by parties who have unequal bargaining power, the fact that the notice of the forum selection clause was not made available to the purchaser until after payment was tendered and a lack of an opportunity for refunds at the point when the forum selection clause was disclosed.

Justice Stevens attached a copy of the original ticket to his dissent to show how only the most meticulous passenger would notice the clause and that notice might be in contention.

== See also ==
- List of United States Supreme Court cases, volume 499
- List of United States Supreme Court cases
- Lists of United States Supreme Court cases by volume
- List of United States Supreme Court cases by the Rehnquist Court
