= List of United States Supreme Court cases, volume 499 =

This is a list of all the United States Supreme Court cases from volume 499 of the United States Reports:

Case name	Citation	Date decided
Pac. Mut. Life Ins. Co. v. Haslip	499 U.S. 1	1991
Air Line Pilots v. O'Neill	499 U.S. 65	1991
W. Va. Univ. Hospitals, Inc. v. Casey	499 U.S. 83	1991
Norfolk & W.R.R. Co. v. Train Dispatchers	499 U.S. 117	1991
Martin v. Occupational Safety & Health Review Comm'n	499 U.S. 144	1991
United States v. Smith	499 U.S. 160	1991
Automobile Workers v. Johnson Controls, Inc.	499 U.S. 187	1991
Salve Regina Coll. v. Russell	499 U.S. 225	1991
EEOC v. Arabian American Oil Co.	499 U.S. 244	1991
Arizona v. Fulminante	499 U.S. 279	1991
United States v. Gaubert	499 U.S. 315	1991
Feist Publications, Inc. v. Rural Tel. Serv. Co.	499 U.S. 340	1991
Columbia v. Omni Outdoor Advertising, Inc.	499 U.S. 365	1991
Powers v. Ohio	499 U.S. 400	1991
Kay v. Ehrler	499 U.S. 432	1991
Leathers v. Medlock	499 U.S. 439	1991
McCleskey v. Zant	499 U.S. 467	1991
Eastern Airlines, Inc. v. Floyd	499 U.S. 530	1991
Cottage Sav. Ass'n v. Comm'r	499 U.S. 554	1991
United States v. Centennial Sav. Bank FSB	499 U.S. 573	1991
Carnival Cruise Lines, Inc. v. Shute	499 U.S. 585	1991
Am. Hosp. Ass'n v. NLRB	499 U.S. 606	1991
California v. Hodari D.	499 U.S. 621	1991
Cole v. Texas	499 U.S. 1301	1991
