= List of United States Supreme Court cases, volume 251 =

Supreme Court of the United States
- Interactive map of Supreme Court of the United States
- 38°53′26″N 77°00′16″W
- Established: March 4, 1789; 236 years ago
- Location: Washington, D.C.
- Coordinates: 38°53′26″N 77°00′16″W
- Composition method: Presidential nomination with Senate confirmation
- Authorised by: Constitution of the United States, Art. III, § 1
- Judge term length: life tenure, subject to impeachment and removal
- Number of positions: 9 (by statute)
- Website: supremecourt.gov

This is a list of cases reported in volume 251 of United States Reports, decided by the Supreme Court of the United States in 1919 and 1920.

== Justices of the Supreme Court at the time of volume 251 U.S. ==
The Supreme Court is established by Article III, Section 1 of the Constitution of the United States, which says: "The judicial Power of the United States, shall be vested in one supreme Court . . .". The size of the Court is not specified; the Constitution leaves it to Congress to set the number of justices. Under the Judiciary Act of 1789 Congress originally fixed the number of justices at six (one chief justice and five associate justices). Since 1789 Congress has varied the size of the Court from six to seven, nine, ten, and back to nine justices (always including one chief justice).

When the cases in volume 251 were decided the Court comprised the following nine members:

Portrait	Justice	Office	Home State	Succeeded	Date confirmed by the Senate (Vote)	Tenure on Supreme Court
	Edward Douglass White	Chief Justice	Louisiana	Melville Fuller	December 12, 1910 (Acclamation)	December 19, 1910 – May 19, 1921 (Died)
	Joseph McKenna	Associate Justice	California	Stephen Johnson Field	January 21, 1898 (Acclamation)	January 26, 1898 – January 5, 1925 (Retired)
	Oliver Wendell Holmes Jr.	Associate Justice	Massachusetts	Horace Gray	December 4, 1902 (Acclamation)	December 8, 1902 – January 12, 1932 (Retired)
	William R. Day	Associate Justice	Ohio	George Shiras Jr.	February 23, 1903 (Acclamation)	March 2, 1903 – November 13, 1922 (Retired)
	Willis Van Devanter	Associate Justice	Wyoming	Edward Douglass White (as Associate Justice)	December 15, 1910 (Acclamation)	January 3, 1911 – June 2, 1937 (Retired)
	Mahlon Pitney	Associate Justice	New Jersey	John Marshall Harlan	March 13, 1912 (50–26)	March 18, 1912 – December 31, 1922 (Resigned)
	James Clark McReynolds	Associate Justice	Tennessee	Horace Harmon Lurton	August 29, 1914 (44–6)	October 12, 1914 – January 31, 1941 (Retired)
	Louis Brandeis	Associate Justice	Massachusetts	Joseph Rucker Lamar	June 1, 1916 (47–22)	June 5, 1916 – February 13, 1939 (Retired)
	John Hessin Clarke	Associate Justice	Ohio	Charles Evans Hughes	July 24, 1916 (Acclamation)	October 9, 1916 – September 18, 1922 (Retired)

== Citation style ==
Under the Judiciary Act of 1789 the federal court structure at the time comprised District Courts, which had general trial jurisdiction; Circuit Courts, which had mixed trial and appellate (from the US District Courts) jurisdiction; and the United States Supreme Court, which had appellate jurisdiction over the federal District and Circuit courts—and for certain issues over state courts. The Supreme Court also had limited original jurisdiction (i.e., in which cases could be filed directly with the Supreme Court without first having been heard by a lower federal or state court). There were one or more federal District Courts and/or Circuit Courts in each state, territory, or other geographical region.

The Judiciary Act of 1891 created the United States Courts of Appeals and reassigned the jurisdiction of most routine appeals from the district and circuit courts to these appellate courts. The Act created nine new courts that were originally known as the "United States Circuit Courts of Appeals." The new courts had jurisdiction over most appeals of lower court decisions. The Supreme Court could review either legal issues that a court of appeals certified or decisions of court of appeals by writ of certiorari. On January 1, 1912, the effective date of the Judicial Code of 1911, the old Circuit Courts were abolished, with their remaining trial court jurisdiction transferred to the U.S. District Courts.

Bluebook citation style is used for case names, citations, and jurisdictions.

- "# Cir." = United States Court of Appeals
  - e.g., "3d Cir." = United States Court of Appeals for the Third Circuit
- "D." = United States District Court for the District of . . .
  - e.g.,"D. Mass." = United States District Court for the District of Massachusetts
- "E." = Eastern; "M." = Middle; "N." = Northern; "S." = Southern; "W." = Western
  - e.g.,"M.D. Ala." = United States District Court for the Middle District of Alabama
- "Ct. Cl." = United States Court of Claims
- The abbreviation of a state's name alone indicates the highest appellate court in that state's judiciary at the time.
  - e.g.,"Pa." = Supreme Court of Pennsylvania
  - e.g.,"Me." = Supreme Judicial Court of Maine

== List of cases in volume 251 U.S. ==
Case Name	Page and year	Opinion of the Court	Concurring opinion(s) Van	Dissenting opinion(s)	Lower Court	Disposition
United States v. Southern Pacific Company	1 (1919)	VanDevanter	none	none	9th Cir.	reversed
Stroud v. United States	15 (1919)	Day	none	none	D. Kan.	affirmed
Pacific Gas and Electric Company v. City of Sacramento	22 (1919)	White	none	none	Cal. Ct. App.	affirmed
Postal Telegraph-Cable Company v. Warren-Godwin Lumber Company	27 (1919)	White	none	none	Miss.	reversed
City of Los Angeles v. Los Angeles Gas and Electric Corporation	32 (1919)	McKenna	none	none	S.D. Cal.	affirmed
Ervien v. United States	41 (1919)	McKenna	none	none	8th Cir.	affirmed
Liverpool, Brazil and River Plate Steam Navigation Company v. Brooklyn Eastern District Terminal	48 (1919)	Holmes	none	none	2d Cir.	affirmed
Chicago, Rock Island and Pacific Railroad Company v. Cole	54 (1919)	Holmes	none	none	Okla.	affirmed
Bragg v. Weaver	57 (1919)	VanDevanter	none	none	Va.	affirmed
St. Louis, Iron Mountain and Southern Railway Company v. Williams	63 (1919)	VanDevanter	none	none	Ark.	affirmed
Corsicana National Bank of Corsicana v. Johnson	68 (1919)	Pitney	none	none	5th Cir.	reversed
Wagner v. City of Covington	95 (1919)	Pitney	none	none	Ky.	affirmed
Oklahoma Railway Company v. Severns Paving Company	104 (1919)	McReynolds	none	none	Okla.	affirmed
Evans v. National Bank of Savannah	108 (1919)	McReynolds	none	Pitney	Ga. Ct. App.	affirmed
Peters v. Veasey	121 (1919)	McReynolds	none	none	La.	reversed
New York, New Haven and Hartford Railroad Company v. United States	123 (1919)	McReynolds	none	none	Ct. Cl.	affirmed
United States v. Osage County	128 (1919)	White	none	none	8th Cir.	reversed
Bone v. Marion County	134 (1919)	McKenna	none	none	7th Cir.	affirmed
Hamilton v. Kentucky Distilleries and Warehouse Company	146 (1919)	Brandeis	none	none	multiple	multiple
Sullivan v. City of Shreveport	169 (1919)	Clarke	none	none	La.	affirmed
Hardin-Wyandot Lighting Company v. Village of Upper Sandusky	173 (1919)	Clarke	none	none	Ohio	affirmed
Godchaux Company v. Estopinal	179 (1919)	McReynolds	none	none	La.	dismissed
Branson v. Bush	182 (1919)	Clarke	none	none	8th Cir.	reversed
City of Winchester v. Winchester Water Works Company	192 (1920)	Day	none	none	E.D. Ky.	affirmed
St. Louis, Iron Mountain and Southern Railway Company v. United States	198 (1920)	Day	none	McReynolds	Ct. Cl.	affirmed
United States v. Standard Brewery, Inc.	210 (1920)	Day	none	none	multiple	affirmed
United States v. Poland	221 (1920)	VanDevanter	none	none	9th Cir.	reversed
Producers Transportation Company v. Railroad Commission of California	228 (1920)	VanDevanter	none	none	Cal.	affirmed
Hayes v. Port of Seattle	233 (1920)	Pitney	none	none	W.D. Wash.	affirmed
Schall v. Camors	239 (1920)	Pitney	none	none	5th Cir.	affirmed
Morganthaler Linotype Company v. Davis	256 (1920)	McReynolds	none	none	Mo. Ct. App.	dismissed
Southern Pacific Company v. Industrial Accident Commission of California	259 (1920)	McReynolds	none	none	Cal.	reversed
Ruppert v. Caffey	264 (1920)	Brandeis	none	McReynolds	S.D.N.Y.	affirmed
Duhne v. New Jersey	311 (1920)	White	none	none	original	dismissed
Western Union Telephone Company v. Boegli	315 (1920)	White	none	none	Ind.	reversed
Birge-Forbes Company v. Heye	317 (1920)	Holmes	none	none	5th Cir.	affirmed
Mail Divisor Cases	326 (1920)	Holmes	Pitney	none	Ct. Cl.	affirmed
Maryland Casualty Company v. United States	342 (1920)	Clarke	none	none	Ct. Cl.	affirmed
Eastern Extension, Australasia and China Telegraph Company, Ltd. v. United States	355 (1920)	Clarke	none	none	Ct. Cl.	affirmed
Napa Valley Electric Company v. Railroad Commission of California	366 (1920)	McKenna	none	none	N.D. Cal.	affirmed
Chipman, Ltd. v. Thomas B. Jeffrey Company	373 (1920)	McKenna	none	none	S.D.N.Y.	affirmed
Stroud v. United States	380 (1920)	Day	none	none	D. Kan.	rehearing denied
Rex v. United States	382 (1920)	Holmes	none	none	Ct. Cl.	affirmed
Silverthorne Lumber Company v. United States	385 (1920)	Holmes	none	none	W.D.N.Y.	reversed
Henry v. United States	393 (1920)	Holmes	none	none	Ct. Cl.	affirmed
Brooks-Scanlon Company v. Railroad Commission of Louisiana	396 (1920)	Holmes	none	none	La.	reversed
Board of Public Utility Commissioners of the Philippines v. Ynchausti and Company	401 (1920)	White	none	none	Phil.	reversed
United States v. Thompson	407 (1920)	White	none	none	W.D. Pa.	reversed
United States v. United States Steel Corporation	417 (1920)	McKenna	none	Day	D.N.J.	affirmed
Schaefer v. United States	466 (1920)	McKenna	Brandeis	Brandeis	E.D. Pa.	multiple
Carbon Steel Company v. Lewellyn	501 (1920)	McKenna	none	none	3d Cir.	affirmed
Worth Brothers Company v. Lederer	507 (1920)	McKenna	none	none	3d Cir.	affirmed
Forged Steel Wheel Company v. Lewellyn	511 (1920)	McKenna	none	none	3d Cir.	affirmed
Dunbar v. City of New York	516 (1920)	McKenna	none	none	N.Y. Sup. Ct.	affirmed
The South Coast	519 (1920)	Holmes	none	none	9th Cir.	affirmed
Bates v. Dresser	524 (1920)	Holmes	none	none	1st Cir.	affirmed
Fort Smith Lumber Company v. Arkansas ex rel. Arbuckle	532 (1920)	Holmes	none	none	Ark.	affirmed
