= Parallel construction =

Law enforcement process that hides details of investigation

Parallel construction is a law enforcement process of building a parallel, or separate, evidentiary basis for a criminal investigation in order to limit disclosure as to the origins of an investigation.

In the US, a particular form is evidence laundering, where one police officer obtains evidence via means that are in violation of the Fourth Amendment's protection against unreasonable searches and seizures, and then passes it on to another officer, who builds on it and gets it accepted by the court under the good-faith exception as applied to the second officer. This practice gained support after the Supreme Court's 2009 Herring v. United States decision.

== By the United States Drug Enforcement Administration ==
In August 2013, a report by Reuters revealed that the Special Operations Division (SOD) of the U.S. Drug Enforcement Administration advises DEA agents to practice parallel construction when creating criminal cases against Americans that are based on NSA warrantless surveillance. The use of illegally obtained evidence is generally inadmissible under the fruit of the poisonous tree doctrine.

Two senior DEA officials explained that the reason parallel construction is used is to protect sources (such as undercover agents or informants) or methods in an investigation. One DEA official had told Reuters: "Parallel construction is a law enforcement technique we use every day. It's decades old, a bedrock concept."

An example from one official about how parallel construction tips work is being told by Special Operations Division that: "Be at a certain truck stop at a certain time and look for a certain vehicle." DEA would alert state troopers and they may wait for that certain vehicle and use drug searching dogs to identify illegal drug-related activity, giving the appearance the search was conducted randomly. Parallel construction allows the prosecution building the drug case to hide the source of where the information came from to protect confidential informants or undercover agents who may be involved with the illegal drug operation from endangering their lives.

A number of former federal agents had used parallel construction during their careers, according to Reuters interviews. Most of the former agents had defended the practice of parallel construction because, according to them, no falsified evidence or illegally obtained material were presented in courts.

A judge can rule evidentiary material inadmissible if it is suspected that the evidence was obtained illegally.

Parallel construction in this case in the US usually is the result of tips from the DEA, as well as the Special Operations Division that are derived from sources within foreign governments, intelligence agencies or court-authorized domestic phone recordings. According to a senior law enforcement official and a former US military intelligence official tips are not given to the DEA until citizenship is verified to avoid any illegal wiretapping of US citizens who are abroad. US authorities require a warrant to wiretap domestic US-persons (citizens and non-citizens alike) and to wiretap US citizens who are abroad.

The Reuters piece occurred amid reporting of the 2013 NSA leaks, although it made no "explicit connection" to the Snowden leaks.

== In the United Kingdom ==
The Register argues the Investigatory Powers Act 2016 introduces parallel construction for evidence obtained through surveillance under the act, and prevents it being revealed or questioned in court.

== In World War II ==
Parallel construction was used to hide the fact that the Enigma machine encryption had been cracked. Operations based on intelligence recovered this way were authorized if there was a plausible alternate means for the data to have been obtained. Many losses were suffered when preventing them would have alerted the Nazis that Enigma had been deciphered.

== In popular culture ==
In Season 5 of The Wire, the Major Crimes Unit, and in particular Lester Freamon, employ an illegal wiretap funded by proceeds diverted from another police investigation in order to dismantle the Stanfield drug organization. The detectives then construct probable cause for the Stanfield arrest warrants, the discovery of which allows Maurice Levy to negotiate Marlo Stanfield's freedom as well as his own.

== See also ==
- Exclusionary rule
- Fourth Amendment to the United States Constitution
- Franks v. Delaware
- Money laundering
