= Erznoznik v. City of Jacksonville =

- Supreme Court of the United States

Argued February 26, 1975 Decided June 23, 1975
- Full case name: Richard Erznoznik etc. v. City of Jacksonville
- Citations: 422 U.S. 205 (more) 95 S. Ct. 2268; 45 L. Ed. 2d 125; 1 Media L. Rep. 1508

Case history
- Prior: 288 So. 2d 260 (Fla. Dist. Ct. App. 1974), cert. denied, 294 So. 2d 93 (Fla. 1974), prob. juris. noted, 419 U.S. 822 (1974).

Holding
- The Court ruled that the ordinance was invalid on its face because the ordinance discriminated among movies solely on the basis of nudity, but not all offensive content so it could not be justified.

Court membership
- Chief Justice Warren E. Burger Associate Justices William O. Douglas · William J. Brennan Jr. Potter Stewart · Byron White; Thurgood Marshall · Harry Blackmun; Lewis F. Powell Jr. · William Rehnquist

Case opinions
- Majority: Powell, joined by Douglas, Brennan, Stewart, Marshall, Blackmun
- Concurrence: Douglas
- Dissent: Burger, joined by Rehnquist
- Dissent: White

Laws applied
- U.S. Const., amend. I; Jacksonville Municipal Code § 330.313

Erznoznik v. City of Jacksonville, 422 U.S. 205 (1975), is a United States Supreme Court case concerning a city ordinance prohibiting the showing of films containing nudity by a drive-in theater located in Jacksonville, Florida.

== Opinion ==
The Supreme Court issued a ruling invalidating the ordinance and held:

(a) The ordinance by discriminating among movies solely on the basis of content has the effect of deterring drive-in theaters from showing movies containing any nudity, however innocent or even educational, and such censorship of the content of otherwise protected speech cannot be justified on the basis of the limited privacy interest of persons on the public streets, who if offended by viewing the movies can readily avert their eyes. Pp. 208–212.

(b) Nor can the ordinance be justified as an exercise of the city's police power for the protection of children against viewing the films. Even assuming that such is its purpose, the restriction is broader than permissible since it is not directed against sexually explicit nudity or otherwise limited. Pp. 212–214.

(c) Nor can the ordinance be justified as a traffic regulation. If this were its purpose, it would be invalid as a strikingly under-inclusive legislative classification since it singles out movies containing nudity from all other movies that might distract a passing motorist. Pp. 214–215.

(d) The possibility of a narrowing construction of the ordinance appears remote, particularly where appellee city offered several distinct justifications for it in its broadest terms. Moreover, its deterrent effect on legitimate expression in the form of movies is both real and substantial. Pp. 215–217.

== See also ==
- Film censorship in the United States
- List of United States Supreme Court cases, volume 422
- List of United States Supreme Court cases by the Burger Court
- List of United States Supreme Court cases involving the First Amendment
- Nudity in film
