= Schweiker v. Chilicky =

- Supreme Court of the United States

Argued March 1, 1988 Decided June 24, 1988
- Full case name: Schweiker, et al. v. Chilicky, et al.
- Citations: 487 U.S. 412 (more) 108 S. Ct. 2460; 101 L. Ed. 2d 370; 1988 U.S. LEXIS 2872; 56 U.S.L.W. 4767; 53 Cal. Comp. Cas 597; Unemployment Ins. Rep. (CCH) ¶ 17,999

Case history
- Prior: Certiorari to the United States Court of Appeals for the Ninth Circuit

Holding
- The improper denial of Social Security disability benefits, allegedly resulting from due process violations by petitioners in their administration of the CDR program, cannot give rise to a cause of action for money damages against petitioners.

Court membership
- Chief Justice William Rehnquist Associate Justices William J. Brennan Jr. · Byron White; Thurgood Marshall · Harry Blackmun; John P. Stevens · Sandra Day O'Connor; Antonin Scalia · Anthony Kennedy

Case opinions
- Majority: O'Connor, joined by Rehnquist, White, Scalia, Kennedy; Stevens (all but n. 3)
- Concurrence: Stevens
- Dissent: Brennan, joined by Marshall, Blackmun

Schweiker v. Chilicky, 487 U.S. 412 (1988), was a United States Supreme Court decision that established limitations on implied causes of action. The Court determined that a cause of action would not be implied for the violation of rights where the U.S. Congress had already provided a remedy for the violation of rights at issue, even if the remedy was inadequate.

In this case, seriously disabled people were wrongfully being denied federal benefits (although, on appeal to an Administrative Law Judge, two-thirds had their payments restored). Although Congress provides for the return of back-pay, no provision is made for pain and suffering or other economic losses. The injured parties sued responsible agency personnel, under the theory that pursuant to Bivens v. Six Unknown Named Agents they could allege a private right of action for deprivation of due process.

The Court examined whether Congress intended a private right of action under these circumstances, and concluded that if Congress has created a meaningful remedy – even if it is incomplete – then no Bivens-type remedy is available. Special factors counseling hesitation included judicial deference to a combination of:

1. some indication that Congress considered providing a cause of action, and chose not to; and
2. the design of some government program containing what Congress considers an adequate remedial mechanism.

Here Congress has provided a great deal of process, and some relief, and has been otherwise silent as to a remedy, which the Court found to be enough to foreclose a Bivens remedy.

== See also ==
- List of United States Supreme Court cases, volume 487
- List of United States Supreme Court cases
- Lists of United States Supreme Court cases by volume
- List of United States Supreme Court cases by the Rehnquist Court
