= Brewer v. Williams =

- Supreme Court of the United States

Argued October 4, 1976 Decided March 23, 1977
- Full case name: Lou V. Brewer, Warden v. Robert Anthony Williams, a/k/a Anthony Erthel Williams
- Docket no.: 74-1263
- Citations: 430 U.S. 387 (more) 97 S. Ct. 1232; 51 L. Ed. 2d 424

Case history
- Prior: Williams v. Brewer, 509 F.2d 227 (8th Cir. 1975)
- Subsequent: See Nix v. Williams, 467 U.S. 431 (1984).

Holding
- Miranda safeguards come into play whenever a person in custody is subjected either to express questioning or to its "functional equivalent."

Court membership
- Chief Justice Warren E. Burger Associate Justices William J. Brennan Jr. · Potter Stewart; Byron White · Thurgood Marshall; Harry Blackmun · Lewis F. Powell Jr. William Rehnquist · John P. Stevens

Case opinions
- Majority: Stewart, joined by Brennan, Marshall, Powell, Stevens
- Concurrence: Marshall
- Concurrence: Powell
- Concurrence: Stevens
- Dissent: Burger
- Dissent: White, joined by Blackmun, Rehnquist
- Dissent: Blackmun, joined by White, Rehnquist

Laws applied
- U.S. Const. amend. VI

Brewer v. Williams, 430 U.S. 387 (1977), is a decision by the United States Supreme Court that clarifies what constitutes "waiver" of the right to counsel for the purposes of the Sixth Amendment. Under Miranda v. Arizona, evidence obtained by police during custodial interrogation of a suspect who was not informed of his Miranda rights is inadmissible. Here, however, the defendant was indicted in court and had asserted his desire to have counsel; thus, his Sixth Amendment right to counsel had attached. At issue was whether a voluntary admission of incriminating facts in response to police statements made while the defendant was in custody and outside the presence of his lawyer constituted a waiver of this right to counsel.

== Facts of the case ==
On the afternoon of December 24, 1968, a 10-year-old girl named Pamela Powers went with her family to the YMCA in Des Moines, Iowa, to watch a wrestling tournament in which her brother was participating. When she failed to return from a trip to the washroom, a search for her began. The search was unsuccessful.

Robert Williams, who had recently escaped from a mental hospital, was a resident of the YMCA. Soon after the girl's disappearance Williams was seen in the YMCA lobby carrying some clothing and a large bundle wrapped in a blanket. He obtained help from a 14-year-old boy in opening the street door of the YMCA and the door to his automobile parked outside. When Williams placed the bundle in the front seat of his car the boy "saw two legs in it and they were skinny and white." Before anyone could see what was in the bundle, Williams drove away. His abandoned car was found the following day in Davenport, roughly 160 mi (260 km) east of Des Moines. A warrant was then issued in Des Moines for his arrest on a charge of abduction.

On the morning of December 26, a Des Moines lawyer named Henry McKnight went to the Des Moines police station and informed the officers present that he had just received a long-distance call from Williams and that he had advised Williams to turn himself in to the Davenport police. Williams surrendered that morning to the police in Davenport, who booked him on the charge specified in the arrest warrant and gave him the warnings required by Miranda v. Arizona. The Davenport police then telephoned the counterparts in Des Moines to inform them that Williams had surrendered. McKnight, the lawyer, was still at the Des Moines police headquarters, and Williams conversed with McKnight on the telephone.

In the presence of the Des Moines chief of police and a police detective named Cleatus Leaming (died 2001), McKnight advised Williams that Des Moines police officers would be driving to Davenport to pick him up, that the officers would not interrogate him or mistreat him, and that Williams was not to talk to the officers about Pamela Powers until after consulting with McKnight upon his return to Des Moines. As a result of these conversations, it was agreed between McKnight and the Des Moines police officials that Detective Leaming and a fellow officer would drive to Davenport to pick up Williams, that they would bring him directly back to Des Moines and that they would not question him during the trip.

In the meantime, Williams was arraigned before a judge in Davenport on the outstanding arrest warrant. The judge advised him of his Miranda rights and committed him to jail. Before leaving the courtroom, Williams conferred with a lawyer named Kelly, who advised him not to make any statements until consulting with McKnight back in Des Moines.

Detective Leaming and his fellow officer arrived in Davenport about noon to pick up Williams and return him to Des Moines. Soon after their arrival they met with Williams and Kelly, who, they understood, was acting as Williams' lawyer. Detective Leaming repeated the Miranda warnings, and told Williams: "[W]e both know that you're being represented here by Mr. Kelly and you're being represented by Mr. McKnight in Des Moines, and... I want you to remember this because we'll be visiting between here and Des Moines."

Williams then conferred again with Kelly alone, and after this conference, Kelly reiterated to Detective Leaming that Williams was not to be questioned about the disappearance of Pamela Powers until after he had consulted with McKnight back in Des Moines. When Leaming expressed some reservations, Kelly firmly stated that the agreement with McKnight was to be carried out: that there was to be no interrogation of Williams during the automobile journey to Des Moines. Kelly was denied permission to ride in the police car back to Des Moines with Williams and the two officers. The two detectives, with Williams in their charge, then set out on the 160 mi drive. At no time during the trip did Williams express a willingness to be interrogated in the absence of an attorney. Instead, he stated several times, "When I get to Des Moines and see Mr. McKnight, I am going to tell you the whole story." Detective Leaming knew that Williams was a former mental patient, and knew also that he was deeply religious.

The detective and his prisoner soon embarked on a wide-ranging conversation covering a variety of topics, including the subject of religion. Then, not long after leaving Davenport and reaching the interstate highway, Detective Leaming delivered what has been referred to in the briefs and oral arguments as the "Christian burial speech." Addressing Williams as "Reverend," the detective said:

"I want to give you something to think about while we're traveling down the road.... Number one, I want you to observe the weather conditions, it's raining, it's sleeting, it's freezing, driving is very treacherous, visibility is poor, it's going to be dark early this evening. They are predicting several inches of snow for tonight, and I feel that you yourself are the only person that knows where this little girl's body is, that you yourself have only been there once, and if you get a snow on top of it you yourself may be unable to find it. And, since we will be going right past the area on the way into Des Moines, I feel that we could stop and locate the body, that the parents of this little girl should be entitled to a Christian burial for the little girl who was snatched away from them on Christmas [E]ve and murdered. And I feel we should stop and locate it on the way in rather than waiting until morning and trying to come back out after a snow storm and possibly not being able to find it at all."

Williams asked Detective Leaming why he thought their route to Des Moines would be taking them past the girl's body, and Leaming responded that he knew the body was in the area of Mitchellville, a town they would be passing on the way to Des Moines. Leaming then stated: "I do not want you to answer me. I don't want to discuss it any further. Just think about it as we're riding down the road."

As the car approached Grinnell, a town approximately 100 mi west of Davenport, Williams asked whether the police had found the victim's shoes. When Detective Leaming replied that he was unsure, Williams directed the officers to a service station where he said he had left the shoes; a search for them proved unsuccessful. As they continued towards Des Moines, Williams asked whether the police had found the blanket, and directed the officers to a rest area where he said he had disposed of the blanket. Nothing was found. The car continued towards Des Moines, and as it approached Mitchellville, Williams said that he would show the officers where the body was. He then directed the police to the body of Pamela Powers.

Williams was indicted for first-degree murder. Before trial, his counsel moved to suppress all evidence relating to or resulting from any statements Williams had made during the automobile ride from Davenport to Des Moines. After an evidentiary hearing the trial judge denied the motion. He found that "an agreement was made between defense counsel and the police officials to the effect that the Defendant was not to be questioned on the return trip to Des Moines," and that the evidence in question had been elicited from Williams during "a critical stage in the proceedings requiring the presence of counsel on his request." The judge ruled, however, that Williams had "waived his right to have an attorney present during the giving of such information."

The evidence in question was introduced over counsel's continuing objection at the subsequent trial. The jury found Williams guilty of murder, and the judgment of conviction was affirmed by the Iowa Supreme Court, a bare majority of whose members agreed with the trial court that Williams had "waived his right to the presence of his counsel" on the automobile ride from Davenport to Des Moines. The four dissenting justices expressed the view that "when counsel and police have agreed defendant is not to be questioned until counsel is present and defendant has been advised not to talk and repeatedly has stated he will tell the whole story after he talks with counsel, the state should be required to make a stronger showing of intentional voluntary waiver than was made here."

Williams then petitioned for a writ of habeas corpus in federal court for the Southern District of Iowa. Counsel for the state and for Williams stipulated that "the case would be submitted on the record of facts and proceedings in the trial court, without taking of further testimony." The District Court made findings of fact as summarized above, and concluded as a matter of law that the evidence in question had been wrongly admitted at Williams' trial. This conclusion was based on three alternative and independent grounds: (1) Williams had been denied his constitutional right to the assistance of counsel; (2) he had been denied the constitutional protections defined by Escobedo v. Illinois, and Miranda v. Arizona; and (3) in any event, his self-incriminatory statements on the automobile trip from Davenport to Des Moines had been involuntarily made. Further, the District Court ruled that there had been no waiver by Williams of the constitutional protections in question.

The Court of Appeals for the Eighth Circuit, with one judge dissenting, affirmed this judgment and denied a petition for rehearing en banc. The Supreme Court granted certiorari to consider the constitutional issues presented.

== Decision ==
Stewart, joined by Brennan, Marshall, Powell, and Stevens, held that for a waiver of the Sixth Amendment right to be acknowledged by the court, it is "incumbent upon the State to prove 'an intentional relinquishment or abandonment'..." "... once adversary proceedings have commenced against an individual, he has a right to legal representation when the government interrogates him." The right to counsel "does not depend upon a request by the defendant, and the courts indulge in every reasonable presumption against waiver." This is a strict standard and is applied equally to an alleged waiver whether it occurred at trial or in a pre-trial proceeding, such as interrogation. This is not to be read as stating that a defendant may not waive his right to counsel after invoking it, but the strictness is necessary to counter the pressure of law enforcement in solving a crime.

Once judicial proceedings begin (here, the arraignment in Davenport, Iowa), the Sixth Amendment dictates that a suspect has the right to counsel. Williams had asserted his right to counsel. He had two lawyers, both had expressed to police that Williams was not to be interrogated without them, and Williams had stated multiple times in the drive that he was going to speak but only after he consulted with a lawyer. The statements made by Det. Leaming were interrogation since they were made with the intention of eliciting an incriminating statement and played on a known susceptibility. There was no attempt on the part of Det. Leaming to determine whether Williams wished to waive his right. There is no reasonable basis under the circumstances to assume that Williams had knowingly waived his right. Therefore, Williams was being interrogated in custody without the protection of counsel and without having waived that right.

Justice Potter Stewart's majority opinion, however, contained a footnote suggesting that the evidence provided by Williams could still be constitutionally used in a trial:

While neither Williams' incriminating statements themselves nor any testimony describing his having led the police to the victim’s body can constitutionally be admitted into evidence, evidence of where the body was found and of its condition might well be admissible on the theory that the body would have been discovered in any event, even had incriminating statements not been elicited from Williams. ... In the event that a retrial is instituted, it will be for the state courts in the first instance to determine whether particular items of evidence may be admitted.

== Aftermath ==
Williams then received a second trial, in which his attorneys again moved to suppress all evidence stemming from the interrogation of Williams by the detectives. The judge ruled that Williams' statements to the detectives was inadmissible, but citing Stewart's footnote, ruled that the body was admissible as evidence, as it would have inevitably been discovered by law enforcement. On July 15, 1977, Williams was again convicted of first degree murder. This conviction was upheld by the Supreme Court in Nix v. Williams (1984), which affirmed the constitutionality of an inevitable discovery exception.

== See also ==
- List of United States Supreme Court cases by the Burger Court
- Murder of Sian O'Callaghan, 2011 English case where defendant's confession was suppressed because he was persuaded by police to show them to the body after being denied access to counsel
