= Frisby v. Schultz =

- Supreme Court of the United States

Argued April 20, 1988 Decided June 27, 1988
- Full case name: Russell Frisby et al. V. Sandra Schultz et al.
- Citations: 487 U.S. 474 (more) 108 S. Ct. 2495; 101 L. Ed. 2d 420
- Argument: Oral argument

Holding
- The Supreme Court upheld the state ordinance because it is "content neutral," "leaves open ample alternative channels of communication," and serves a "significant government interest."

Court membership
- Chief Justice William Rehnquist Associate Justices William J. Brennan Jr. · Byron White; Thurgood Marshall · Harry Blackmun; John P. Stevens · Sandra Day O'Connor; Antonin Scalia · Anthony Kennedy

Case opinions
- Majority: O'Connor, joined by Rehnquist, Blackmun, Scalia, Kennedy
- Concurrence: White
- Dissent: Brennan, joined by Marshall
- Dissent: Stevens

Laws applied
- U.S. Const. amend. I

Frisby v. Schultz, 487 U.S. 474 (1988), was a case in which the Supreme Court of the United States upheld the ordinance by the town of Brookfield, Wisconsin, preventing protest outside of a residential home. In a 6–3 decision, the Court ruled that the First Amendment rights to freedom of assembly and speech was not facially violated. The majority opinion, written by Justice Sandra Day O'Connor, concluded that the ordinance was constitutionally valid because it was narrowly tailored to meet a "substantial and justifiable" interest in the state; left open "ample alternative channels of communication"; and was content-neutral.

== Factual background ==
In the Milwaukee, Wisconsin suburb of Brookfield, Sandra C. Schultz and Robert C. Braun protested abortion by picketing outside the home of a doctor who performed abortions. The pair picketed on at least six occasions in April and May 1985, for between 60 and 90 minutes each time, with a group of protesters that ranged in size from 11 to more than 40. The picketing was "generally orderly and peaceful"—the town did not invoke ordinances on street obstructions, loud noises, or disorderly conduct—but "generated substantial controversy and numerous complaints."

In response, Brookfield Town Board enacted an ordinance restricting picketing in residential neighborhoods, except for labor picketing. The town later realized the Supreme Court had struck down a similar ordinance in Carey v. Brown, 447 U.S. 455 (1980), as a violation of the Equal Protection Clause, of the Fourteenth Amendment since it "makes an impermissible distinction between peaceful labor picketing and other peaceful picketing." As a result, the town repealed its ordinance and passed a new ordinance banning all residential picketing: "It is unlawful for any person to engage in picketing before or about the residence or dwelling of any individual in the Town of Brookfield." The ordinance stated that its main purpose was to protect and preserve the home and assure "that members of the community enjoy in their homes and dwellings a feeling of well-being, tranquility, and privacy." The Town Board also found that "the practice of picketing before or about residences and dwellings causes emotional disturbance and distress to the occupants ... [and] has as its object the harassing of such occupants."

== Procedural history ==
Schultz and Braun ceased protesting after the law was set to be enforced beginning on May 21, 1985. They filed a lawsuit in the United States District Court for the Eastern District of Wisconsin claiming that the town ordinance infringed on their First Amendment rights. The district court granted the motion for a preliminary injunction, concluding "that the ordinance was not narrowly tailored enough to restrict protected speech in a public forum." The Town appealed. In a divided decision, a panel of the United States Court of Appeals for the Seventh Circuit affirmed the decision of the district court. The Seventh Circuit later vacated that decision and ordered a rehearing en banc. After rehearing, the Seventh Circuit, in an equally divided vote, affirmed the district court's judgment.

== Supreme Court ==
=== Opinion of the Court ===
Justice Sandra Day O'Connor wrote the majority opinion in the 6–3 decision. Chief Justice William Rehnquist, and Justices Harry Blackmun, Antonin Scalia, and Anthony Kennedy joined in the majority opinion.

The majority held that public streets are a "traditional public forum" for purposes of forum analysis, despite the fact that the residential streets specifically at issue here were physically narrow. The Court thus acknowledged that "the antipicketing ordinance operates at the core of the First Amendment." Nevertheless, the majority held that the ordinance prohibiting the protest of residential houses did not violate the First Amendment because it is "content neutral," "leaves open ample alternative channels of communication," and serves a "significant government interest." With respect to alternative channels of communication, the Court noted that the Brookfield ordinance did not prohibit protestors from entering residential neighborhoods, marching, canvassing, leafleting, or telephoning.

The Court also found that the government had a significant interest in "the protection of residential privacy." Citing cases such as Rowan v. United States Post Office Department, FCC v. Pacifica Foundation, and Kovacs v. Cooper, the Court found that "a special benefit of the privacy all citizens enjoy within their own walls, which the State may legislate to protect, is an ability to avoid intrusions." The Court distinguished its prior decisions invalidating "complete bans on expressive activity" in residential areas, such as Schneider v. New Jersey and Martin v. City of Struthers, stating that in these cases, "we have been careful to acknowledge that unwilling listeners may be protected when within their own homes." The Court also found that the ordinance was narrowly tailored at the specific problem it intended to address: situations in which "[t]he resident is figuratively, and perhaps literally, trapped within the home, and, because of the unique and subtle impact of such picketing, is left with no ready means of avoiding the unwanted speech."

=== Concurring opinion ===
Justice White wrote an opinion concurring in the judgment. White wrote that in his view, an ordinance banning picketing of a single residence "would not be unconstitutional on its face [and therefore, free of conflict with the First Amendment.]" Acknowledging the loosely worded ordinance, White opposed the potential condition of the legislation, which, if interpreted as such, would place a limitation on picketing in front of any residence where passers-by or anyone else would receive a message from a protest. He agreed with the notion that the law should be interpreted to ban single-residence picketing, to maintain Constitutionality and conform with the standards set in the right of assembly and the right to protest, outlined in the First Amendment.

=== Dissenting opinion of Brennan and Marshall ===
Justice William J. Brennan, Jr., joined by Justice Thurgood Marshall, agreed with most of the Court's analysis, but dissented because they believed the ordinance was not narrowly tailored—i.e., it banned "significantly more speech than is necessary to achieve the government's substantial and legitimate goal." Brennan argued that the ordinance failed the test of City Council of Los Angeles v. Taxpayers for Vincent because "the intrusive and unduly coercive elements of residential picketing can be eliminated without simultaneously eliminating residential picketing." As an example, Brennan wrote that the government's ability to constitutionally impose "time, place, and manner" restrictions, such as limits on the number of residential picketers, "the hours during which a residential picket may take place, or the noise level of such a picket" meant that a total prohibition on residential picketing was not narrowly tailored.

=== Dissenting opinion of Stevens ===
Justice John Paul Stevens wrote a separate dissent. Stevens wrote that:

I do not believe that picketing for the sole purpose of imposing psychological harm on a family in the shelter of their home is constitutionally protected. I do believe, however, that the picketers have a right to communicate their strong opposition to abortion to the doctor, but after they have had a fair opportunity to communicate that message, I see little justification for allowing them to remain in front of his home and repeat it over and over again simply to harm the doctor and his family. Thus, I agree that the ordinance may be constitutionally applied to the kind of picketing that gave rise to its enactment.

Nevertheless, Stevens would have invalidated the ordinance as facially overbroad, finding "that it prohibits some communication that is protected by the First Amendment. Stevens wrote that the ordinance could prohibit a fifth grader from carrying a sign saying "GET WELL CHARLIE — OUR TEAM NEEDS YOU" outside the home of a sick friend.

Stevens acknowledged that "the town will probably not enforce its ban against friendly, innocuous, or even brief unfriendly picketing, and that the Court may be right in concluding that its legitimate sweep makes its overbreadth insubstantial," but dissented because (1) "The scope of the ordinance gives the town officials far too much discretion in making enforcement decisions" and (2) "it is a simple matter for the town to amend its ordinance and to limit the ban to conduct that unreasonably interferes with the privacy of the home and does not serve a reasonable communicative purpose."

== See also ==
- Madsen v. Women's Health Center, Inc., a 1994 decision which allowed protesting outside residential homes.
- List of United States Supreme Court cases, volume 487
- List of United States Supreme Court cases
- Lists of United States Supreme Court cases by volume
- List of United States Supreme Court cases by the Rehnquist Court
