= Silverthorne Lumber Co. v. United States =

- Supreme Court of the United States

Argued December 12, 1919 Decided January 26, 1920
- Full case name: Silverthorne Lumber Co., Inc., et al. v. United States
- Citations: 251 U.S. 385 (more) 40 S. Ct. 182; 64 L. Ed. 319; 1920 U.S. LEXIS 1685

Holding
- To permit derivatives would encourage police to circumvent the Fourth Amendment, so the illegal copied evidence was held tainted and inadmissible.

Court membership
- Chief Justice Edward D. White Associate Justices Joseph McKenna · Oliver W. Holmes Jr. William R. Day · Willis Van Devanter; Mahlon Pitney · James C. McReynolds; Louis Brandeis · John H. Clarke

Case opinions
- Majority: Holmes, joined by McKenna, Day, Van Devanter, McReynolds, Brandeis, Clark
- Dissent: White
- Dissent: Pitney

Silverthorne Lumber Co. v. United States, 251 U.S. 385 (1920), was a U.S. Supreme Court decision in which Silverthorne had attempted to evade paying taxes. Federal agents illegally seized tax books from Silverthorne and created copies of the records. The ruling, delivered by Oliver Wendell Holmes Jr., was that any evidence obtained, even indirectly, from an illegal search was inadmissible in court. He reasoned that otherwise, police would have an incentive to circumvent the Fourth Amendment to obtain derivatives of the illegally obtained evidence. This precedent later became known as the "fruit of the poisonous tree doctrine," and is an extension of the exclusionary rule.

Chief Justice Edward Douglass White and Associate Justice Mahlon Pitney dissented without a written opinion.

== See also ==
- List of United States Supreme Court cases, volume 251
- Wong Sun v. United States, 371 U.S. 471 (1963)
