= Coy v. Iowa =

- Supreme Court of the United States

Argued January 13, 1988 Decided June 29, 1988
- Full case name: Coy v. Iowa
- Citations: 487 U.S. 1012 (more) 108 S.Ct. 2798, 101 L.Ed.2d 857
- Argument: Oral argument
- Opinion announcement: Opinion announcement

Case history
- Prior: 397 N.W.2d 730 (1986), probable jurisdiction noted, 483 U.S. 1019 (1987)

Holding
- Appellant's Confrontation Clause right to confront the witnesses against him was violated because a screen had been placed between him and the witnesses testifying against him, preventing him from seeing the witnesses during their testimony. Supreme Court of Iowa reversed and remanded.

Court membership
- Chief Justice William Rehnquist Associate Justices William J. Brennan Jr. · Byron White; Thurgood Marshall · Harry Blackmun; John P. Stevens · Sandra Day O'Connor; Antonin Scalia · Anthony Kennedy

Case opinions
- Majority: Scalia, joined by Brennan, White, Marshall, Stevens, O'Connor
- Concurrence: O'Connor, joined by White
- Dissent: Blackmun, joined by Rehnquist
- Kennedy took no part in the consideration or decision of the case.

Coy v. Iowa, 487 U.S. 1012 (1988), was a 1988 United States Supreme Court case concerning the Confrontation Clause of the Sixth Amendment to the United States Constitution. The Court held that the placement of a screen between a defendant and the witnesses testifying against him, making it impossible for the witnesses to see him during their testimony, violated the Confrontation Clause. Accordingly, it reversed the conviction of the appellant, John Coy, who had been convicted of two counts of lascivious acts with a child.

== Opinions ==
The majority opinion was authored by Justice Antonin Scalia and joined by five other justices. Justice Scalia wrote, "The screen at issue was specifically designed to enable the complaining witnesses to avoid viewing appellant as they gave their testimony, and the record indicates that it was successful in this objective...It is difficult to imagine a more obvious or damaging violation of the defendant's right to a face-to-face encounter." Justice Sandra Day O'Connor authored a concurrence, joined by Justice Byron White, in which she argued that the rights guaranteed by the Confrontation Clause "are not absolute but rather may give way in an appropriate case to other competing interests so as to permit the use of certain procedural devices designed to shield a child witness from the trauma of courtroom testimony." The dissenting opinion was authored by Justice Harry Blackmun and joined by Chief Justice William Rehnquist. In his dissent, Justice Blackmun wrote, "I fear that the Court's apparent fascination with the witness' ability to see the defendant will lead the States that are attempting to adopt innovations to facilitate the testimony of child victims of sex abuse to sacrifice other, more central, confrontation interests, such as the right to cross-examination or to have the trier of fact observe the testifying witness."

== Reactions ==
When the Court announced the decision in June 1988, some legal commentators criticized the majority opinion for deviating from the Court's previous decisions interpreting the Confrontation Clause. Critics also argued that the decision underestimated the legitimate interest of states in protecting child abuse victims from the trauma of seeing their abusers in court.
