= Warth v. Seldin =

- Supreme Court of the United States

Argued March 17, 1975 Decided June 25, 1975
- Full case name: Warth, et al. v. Seldin, et al.
- Citations: 422 U.S. 490 (more) 95 S. Ct. 2197; 45 L. Ed. 2d 343; 1975 U.S. LEXIS 76

Case history
- Prior: Cert. to the United States Court of Appeals for the Second Circuit

Holding
- Petitioners lack standing because they did not allege sufficient facts to show that their injuries were caused by the town's zoning practices.

Court membership
- Chief Justice Warren E. Burger Associate Justices William O. Douglas · William J. Brennan Jr. Potter Stewart · Byron White; Thurgood Marshall · Harry Blackmun; Lewis F. Powell Jr. · William Rehnquist

Case opinions
- Majority: Powell, joined by Burger, Stewart, Blackmun, Rehnquist
- Dissent: Douglas
- Dissent: Brennan, joined by White, Marshall

Laws applied
- U.S. Const. Article III

Warth v. Seldin, 422 U.S. 490 (1975), was a United States Supreme Court case in which the Court reviewed the concept of judicial standing and affirmed that if the plaintiffs lacked standing, they could not maintain a case against the defendants.

== Background ==
The not-for-profit organization Metro-Act of Rochester, together with eight individual plaintiffs, filed suit in District Court brought action against the town of Penfield, New York, a suburb of Rochester, and against members of the Zoning, Planning, and Town Boards of Penfield, alleging that Penfield's zoning ordinances had the "purpose and effect" of excluding persons of low and moderate income from living in the town by allocating 98% of vacant land to single-family homes and imposing various requirements that increased the cost of single-family detached housing.

Several individual plaintiffs alleged the zoning regulations resulted in residential segregation that was discriminatory in violation of the constitution. Inner city taxpayers alleged that they paid more in taxes because zoning regulations in the suburban town of Penfield prevented the construction of subsidized affordable housing.

== Lower courts ==
Several low-income and minority individual plaintiffs claimed that the enforcement of ordinances against third party builders harmed them because they could not reside in Penfield. Indirect injuries like this may not always be disqualifying but it is more difficult to show that the alleged unlawful actions caused the plaintiff's injury. Taxpayers and third-party organizations were also party to the suit, or attempting to join as parties.The District Court for the Western District of New York dismissed the complaint for lack of standing.The Court of Appeals for the Second Circuit affirmed that the parties lacked standing. The Supreme Court granted certiorari.

== Supreme Court ==
=== Opinion of the Court ===
"Article III standing" requires that a plaintiff has suffered an injury that is redressable by a court's judgment. This is a jurisdictional requirement. Writing for the majority, Justice Powell says that "other limits on the class of persons" are "closely related to Art. III concerns but essentially matters of judicial self-governance". These include restrictions on "generalized grievances" where the "injury" is shared by a large number of citizens because "abstract question of wide public significance" that do not require "judicial intervention...to protect individual rights" may be resolved by the "normal democratic process".

The Court then considered the three categories of plaintiffs: low and moderate income individuals, inner city tax payers and organizations.

The Court found that the individual plaintiffs most likely would not have been able to afford to live in Penfield even if the town had not obstructed the two projects described in the record. The Court therefore concluded that the facts alleged were insufficient to establish a causal relationship between the zoning restrictions and the plaintiff's inability to reside in Penfield.

The Rochester taxpayer plaintiffs were not subject to Penfield's zoning restrictions and did not meet the requirements for third party standing, such as an adversely effected relationship between the Rochester taxpayers and the injured party.

Home Builders alleged that the zoning restrictions and denials of variances and permits by town officials deprived them of "substantial business opportunities and profits". The Court concluded that the alleged injury to Home Builders' members was not "of sufficient immediacy and ripeness to warrant judicial intervention" because the complaint did not refer to a "specific project...currently preculded either by the ordinance or by respondents action in enforcing it". The Court's reasoning for denying Housing Council was similar; one member of the organization was denied a zoning variance in 1969 but did not assert that the project "remained viable" in 1972.

== Reaction ==
David M. Ifshin commented that "Warth's continuation of the trend toward tightened standing requirements has further limited access to federal courts for all public interest litigants." Law professor Lawrence G. Sager said the Court's decision in Warth applied a causality requirement to standing analysis that was "quite likely to preclude the federal adjudiciation of most significant [exclusionary zoning challenges]". Sager did not find Justice Powell's emphasis on project-based actions convincing: "As a matter of standing doctrine...even if the project is built the likelihood of one of the named plaintiffs...actually being housed in the project is slight. On the other hand, were ambtious lawsuits like that in Warth to go forward, and result in substantial reworking of the zoning packages extant in various communities, there is a real possibility that over time there would be a measureable increment added to the supply of desirable lower income housing within a region." Richard Galloway pointed out that " standing barriers ... resulted in dismissal of equal protection claims without reaching the merits".

== See also ==
- Baker v. Carr
- Linda R.S. v. Richard D.
