= United States v. Kozminski =

- Supreme Court of the United States

Argued February 23, 1988 Decided June 29, 1988
- Full case name: United States v. Kozminski, et al.
- Citations: 487 U.S. 931 (more) 108 S. Ct. 2751; 101 L. Ed. 2d 788

Holding
- For purposes of criminal prosecution, the term "involuntary servitude" necessarily means a condition of servitude in which the victim is forced to work for the defendant by the use or threat of physical restraint or physical injury or by the use or threat of coercion through law or the legal process. This definition encompasses cases in which the defendant holds the victim in servitude by placing him or her in fear of such physical restraint or injury or legal coercion.

Court membership
- Chief Justice William Rehnquist Associate Justices William J. Brennan Jr. · Byron White; Thurgood Marshall · Harry Blackmun; John P. Stevens · Sandra Day O'Connor; Antonin Scalia · Anthony Kennedy

Case opinions
- Majority: O'Connor, joined by Rehnquist, White, Scalia, Kennedy
- Concurrence: Brennan, joined by Marshall
- Concurrence: Stevens, joined by Blackmun

Laws applied
- U.S. Const. amend. XIII

United States v. Kozminski, 487 U.S. 931 (1988), was a United States Supreme Court case involving the Thirteenth Amendment to the United States Constitution and involuntary servitude.

Ike and Margarethe Kozminski and their son John were accused of enslaving two men on their farm. A federal jury convicted the husband and wife of holding the men against their will and conspiring to do so, and John was convicted on the conspiracy charge. The case was appealed to the U.S. Supreme Court.

The Supreme Court held that the jury had been improperly instructed as to the nature of involuntary servitude under existing law and remanded the case for a new trial. The defendants eventually pleaded guilty to misdemeanor violations of labor law.

== See also ==
- List of United States Supreme Court cases, volume 487
- List of United States Supreme Court cases
- Lists of United States Supreme Court cases by volume
- List of United States Supreme Court cases by the Rehnquist Court
