= List of United States Supreme Court cases, volume 487 =

This is a list of all United States Supreme Court cases from volume 487 of the United States Reports:

Case name	Citation	Date decided
N.Y. State Club Ass'n, Inc. v. City of New York	487 U.S. 1	1988
Stewart Organization, Inc. v. Ricoh Corp.	487 U.S. 22	1988
West v. Atkins	487 U.S. 42	1988
Sup. Ct. v. Friedman	487 U.S. 59	1988
U.S. Cath. Conf. v. Abortion Rights Mobilization, Inc.	487 U.S. 72	1988
Ross v. Oklahoma	487 U.S. 81	1988
Braswell v. United States	487 U.S. 99	1988
Felder v. Casey	487 U.S. 131	1988
Franklin v. Lynaugh	487 U.S. 164	1988
Doe v. United States	487 U.S. 201	1988
Florida v. Long	487 U.S. 223	1988
Bank of Nova Scotia v. United States	487 U.S. 250	1988
City of Houston v. Lack	487 U.S. 266	1988
Patterson v. Illinois	487 U.S. 285	1988
Torres v. Oakland Scavenger Co.	487 U.S. 312	1988
United States v. Taylor	487 U.S. 326	1988
Miss. Power & Light Co. v. Mississippi ex rel. Moore	487 U.S. 354	1988
Sheridan v. United States	487 U.S. 392	1988
Schweiker v. Chilicky	487 U.S. 412	1988
Kadrmas v. Dickinson Pub. Sch.	487 U.S. 450	1988
Frisby v. Schultz	487 U.S. 474	1988
Boyle v. United Techs. Corp.	487 U.S. 500	1988
Murray v. United States	487 U.S. 533	1988
Pierce v. Underwood	487 U.S. 552	1988
Bowen v. Kendrick	487 U.S. 589	1988
Morrison v. Olson	487 U.S. 654	1988
Commc'ns Workers v. Beck	487 U.S. 735	1988
Riley v. Nat'l Fed'n of Blind	487 U.S. 781	1988
Thompson v. Oklahoma	487 U.S. 815	1988
Bowen v. Massachusetts	487 U.S. 879	1988
United States v. Kozminski	487 U.S. 931	1988
Watson v. Fort Worth Bank & Tr.	487 U.S. 977	1988
Coy v. Iowa	487 U.S. 1012	1988
