= City of Richmond v. United States =

- Supreme Court of the United States

Argued April 23, 1975 Decided June 24, 1975
- Full case name: City of Richmond, Virginia v. United States
- Citations: 422 U.S. 358 (more) 95 S. Ct. 2296; 45 L. Ed. 2d 245

Case history
- Prior: 376 F. Supp. 1344 (D.D.C. 1974)

Holding
- An annexation reducing the relative political strength of the minority race in the enlarged city as compared with what it was before the annexation does not violate 5 of the Act as long as the postannexation system fairly recognizes, as it does in this case; the minority's political potential.

Court membership
- Chief Justice Warren E. Burger Associate Justices William O. Douglas · William J. Brennan Jr. Potter Stewart · Byron White; Thurgood Marshall · Harry Blackmun; Lewis F. Powell Jr. · William Rehnquist

Case opinions
- Majority: White, joined by Burger, Stewart, Blackmun, Rehnquist
- Dissent: Brennan, joined by Douglas, Marshall
- Powell took no part in the consideration or decision of the case.

City of Richmond v. United States, 422 U.S. 358 (1975), was a case that upheld Richmond, Virginia's annexation of land from surrounding counties.

== See also ==
- List of United States Supreme Court cases, volume 422
- Shaw v. Reno
- Miller v. Johnson
