= Madsen v. Women's Health Center, Inc. =

- Supreme Court of the United States

Argued April 28, 1994 Decided June 30, 1994
- Full case name: Judy Madsen, et al. v. Women's Health Center, Inc., et al.
- Citations: 512 U.S. 753 (more) 114 S. Ct 2516; 129 L. Ed. 2d 593; 1994 U.S. LEXIS 5087
- Argument: Oral argument

Case history
- Prior: Operation Rescue v. Women's Health Ctr., Inc., 626 So. 2d 664 (Fla. 1993); cert. granted, 510 U.S. 1084 (1994).

Court membership
- Chief Justice William Rehnquist Associate Justices Harry Blackmun · John P. Stevens; Sandra Day O'Connor · Antonin Scalia; Anthony Kennedy · David Souter; Clarence Thomas · Ruth Bader Ginsburg

Case opinions
- Majority: Rehnquist, joined by Blackmun, O'Connor, Souter, Ginsburg; Stevens (parts I, II, III-E, IV)
- Concurrence: Souter
- Concur/dissent: Stevens
- Concur/dissent: Scalia, joined by Kennedy, Thomas

Laws applied
- U.S. Const. amend. I

Madsen v. Women's Health Center, Inc., 512 U.S. 753 (1994), is a United States Supreme Court case where Petitioners challenged the constitutionality of an injunction entered by a Florida state court which prohibits antiabortion protesters from demonstrating in certain places, and in various ways outside of a health clinic that performs abortions.

The Petitioners, Madsen and other abortion protesters (Petitioners) regularly protested the Respondents, the Women’s Health Center and other abortion clinics (Respondent), in Melbourne, Florida as well as in front of the homes of clinic employees. The Respondents then sought and were granted, by a Florida trial court, an injunction on several grounds, restraining the Petitioner’s ability to protest, which was upheld by the Florida Supreme Court. The Petitioner’s appeal to the United States Supreme Court claimed that the injunction restricted their rights to free speech under the First Amendment of the United States Constitution. The U.S. Supreme Court affirmed in part and reversed in part.

== Background ==
=== Facts ===
The Petitioners protest abortion clinics run by Respondents. The Petitioners picketed and demonstrated where the public street gives access to the clinic. The Petitioners have been permanently enjoined by a Florida court from blocking or interfering with public access to the clinic and from physically abusing persons entering or leaving the clinic. Six months later, the Respondents sought to broaden the injunction, complaining that the Petitioners still impede potential patients. The trial court then issued a broader injunction, for which the Petitioners challenge as a violation of their First Amendment constitutional rights. The Amendment injunction prohibits the Petitioners from entering the premises of the Respondents, blocking or impeding access to the Respondents’ premises, from picketing and demonstrating or entering a portion of public right of way or private property within 36 feet of the property line of the Clinic, from causing excess noise from 7:30 am to noon Monday thru Saturday when procedures and recovery periods occur, from physically approaching or causing noise within 300 feet of any of the Respondents’ employees homes, from harassing anyone trying to gain access Respondents’ clinic, from displaying certain objectionable images and from inciting others to commit any of these prohibited acts. Upon appeal the Florida Supreme Court upheld the constitutionality of the injunction, causing the Petitioners to appeal.

The petitioners in Madsen v. Women's Health Center, Inc. were members of Operation Rescue America (hereinafter Operation Rescue), a group whose goal is to close down abortion clinics throughout the country. The Aware Woman Center for Choice, operated by the Women's Health Center, Inc., a women's health care clinic, provided abortions and counseling to its clients. Members of Operation Rescue engaged in picketing and demonstrations in front of and around the clinic, essentially blocking the entrance to the clinic.

The members of Operation Rescue were extremely open about their intent to have the clinics incapacitated. They stated to the press that they intended to shut down a clinic. The literature of the organization stated that "their members should ignore the law of the State and the police officers who remove them from their blockading positions." Women's Health Center, Inc., brought an action for injunctive relief prohibiting Operation Rescue members from engaging in these activities.

=== Issues ===
- Whether the State has a significant state interest enabling it to restrict the Petitioners’ First Amendment constitutional rights?
- Whether the 36 foot buffer zone around the clinic entrances and driveway are constitutional restrictions on the Petitioners’ First Amendment constitutional rights?
- Whether the 36 foot provision as applied to private property around the clinic is a constitutional restriction on the Petitioners’ First Amendment constitutional rights?
- Whether the noise prohibition provision of the injunction is a constitutional restriction on the Petitioners’ First Amendment constitutional rights?
- Whether the images observable prohibition is a constitutional restriction of the Petitioners’ First Amendment constitutional rights?
- Whether the 300-foot no approach zone around the clinic and employee residences is a permissible restriction of the Petitioners’ First Amendment constitutional rights?

== Opinion of the Court ==
=== Majority opinion ===
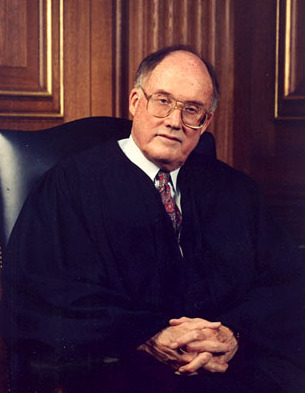
Justice William Rehnquist authored the majority opinion for Madsen v. Women's Health Center, Inc.

The Madsen majority sustained the constitutionality of the Clinic's thirty-six foot buffer zone and the noise-level provision, finding that they burdened no more speech than necessary to serve the injunction's goals. However, the Court struck down the thirty-six foot buffer zone as applied to the private property north and west of the Clinic, the 'images observable' provision, the three hundred foot no-approach zone around the Clinic, and the three hundred foot buffer zone around residences. The Court found that these provisions " [swept] more broadly than necessary" to protect the state's interests. Thus, the judgment of the Florida Supreme Court was affirmed in part and reversed in part.

=== Regular concurrence ===
Justice Souter, concurring.

I join the Court's opinion and write separately only to clarify two matters in the record. First, the trial judge made reasonably clear that the issue of who was acting "in concert" with the named defendants was a matter to be taken up in individual cases, and not to be decided on the basis of protesters' viewpoints. See Tr. 40, 43, 93, 115, 119-120 (Apr. 12, 1993, Hearing). Second, petitioners themselves acknowledge that the governmental interests in protection of public safety and order, of the free flow of traffic, and of property rights are reflected in Florida law. See Brief for Petitioners 17, and n. 7 (citing, e.g., Fla. Stat. §§ 870.041-870.047 (1991) (public peace); § 316.2045 (obstruction of public streets, highways, and roads)).

=== Special concurrence ===
Justice Stevens, concurring in part and dissenting in part.

The certiorari petition presented three questions, corresponding to petitioners' three major challenges to the trial court's injunction.[1] The Court correctly and unequivocally rejects petitioners' argument that the injunction is a "content-based restriction on free speech," ante, at 762-764, as well as their challenge to the injunction on the basis that it applies to persons acting "in concert" with them, ante, at 775-776. I therefore join Parts II and IV of the Court's opinion, which properly dispose of the first and third questions presented. I part company with the Court, however, on its treatment of the second question presented, including its enunciation of the applicable standard of review.

Concludes that under the circumstances the prohibition against physically approaching in the 300-foot zone around the clinic withstands the Petitioners’ First Amendment constitutional challenge. This is because the Petitioners’ “counseling” of the clinic’s patients is a form of expression analogous to labor picketing. It is a mixture of content and communication. Just as the First Amendment of the Constitution protects the speaker’s right to offer “sidewalk counseling” to all passersby. That protection, however, does not encompass attempts to abuse an unreceptive or captive audience, at least under the circumstances in this case. The dissent also feels that the injunction generally should be no more burdensome than necessary to provide complete relief. Therefore, standards fashioned to determine the constitutionality of statutes should not be used to evaluate injunctions.

=== Dissenting opinion ===
The injunction in this case departs so far from the established jurisprudence of the Supreme Court that in any other context it would have been regarded as a candidate for summary reversal. But since this decision deals with abortion, no legal rule or doctrine is safe from ad hoc nullification by the Supreme Court when an occasion for its application arises in a case involving state regulation of abortion. The dissent believes that the 36 foot speech-free zone did not meet the burden for the test the Supreme Court set, as it burdens more speech than necessary. The dissent charges that speech-restricting injunctions are deserving of strict scrutiny by the Supreme Court and that the Supreme Court did not award it this level of review in this case and therefore dissents from all portions of the judgment upholding the injunction.

=== Held ===
Refer to above Issues

- Yes. - The State has a strong interest in protecting a woman’s freedom to seek lawful medical or counseling services in connection with her pregnancy. The State also has an interest in ensuring public safety, and public order, in promoting the free flow of traffic on its streets and sidewalks. The State also has a strong interest in protecting residential privacy. The combination of which is sufficient to justify an appropriately tailored injunction to protect them.
- Yes. - The 36-foot buffer zone around the clinic entrances and driveway burdens no more speech than necessary to accomplish the governmental interest at stake.
- No. - The 36-foot buffer zone on private property around the clinic burdens more speech than necessary to protect access to the clinic, as nothing in the record indicates that the Petitioners’ activities on the private property have obstructed access to the clinic.
- Yes. - The limited noise restrictions limit no more speech than necessary to ensure the health and well-being of the patients at the clinic. The First Amendment of the Constitution does not demand that patients at a medical facility undertake Herculean efforts to escape the cacophony of political protests.
- No. - The images observable provision in the injunction limits more speech than necessary to achieve the purpose of limiting threats to clinic patients or their families. It is much easier for the clinic to pull its curtains than for a patient to stop up her ears, and no more is required to avoid seeing placards through the windows of the clinic. Therefore, this provision is an unconstitutional restriction because of the availability of this less restrictive means.
- No. - The record before the Supreme Court does not contain sufficient justification for this broad ban on picketing, it appears that a limitation, on the time, duration of picketing, and number of pickets outside a smaller zone could have accomplished the desired result, while placing a lesser restriction on the Petitioners’ First Amendment constitutional rights.

== See also ==
- Frisby v. Schultz, a 1988 Supreme Court decision which barred protests outside residential homes.
