= Sheridan v. United States =

- Supreme Court of the United States

Argued April 26, 1988 Decided June 24, 1988
- Full case name: Sheridan v. United States
- Citations: 487 U.S. 392 (more) 108 S. Ct. 2449; 101 L. Ed. 2d 352

Holding
- Although the words "any claims arising out of" an assault or battery in the Federal Tort Claims Act are broad enough to bar all claims based entirely on an assault or battery, in at least some situations, the fact that injury was directly caused by an assault or battery will not preclude liability against the Government for negligently allowing the assault to occur.

Court membership
- Chief Justice William Rehnquist Associate Justices William J. Brennan Jr. · Byron White; Thurgood Marshall · Harry Blackmun; John P. Stevens · Sandra Day O'Connor; Antonin Scalia · Anthony Kennedy

Case opinions
- Majority: Stevens, joined by Brennan, White, Marshall, Blackmun
- Concurrence: White
- Concurrence: Kennedy
- Dissent: O'Connor, joined by Rehnquist, Scalia

Laws applied
- Federal Tort Claims Act

Sheridan v. United States, 487 U.S. 392 (1988), was a U.S. Supreme Court case concerning what constitutes a claim "arising out of" an assault or battery within the meaning of the Federal Tort Claims Act (FTCA). The Supreme Court held that the FTCA's intentional tort exception did not apply.

== Background ==
Naval medical aide, Carr, became intoxicated after his shift, and three of his co-workers found him face down on a hospital floor. They attempted to bring him to the emergency room, but he broke away and showed that he had a gun. The three co-workers fled and did nothing more. The intoxicated serviceman then fired several single shots into a car on a public street near Bethesda Naval Hospital and injured plaintiffs and damaged their car.

=== Lower courts ===
While 28 U.S.C. § 1346(b) of the Federal Tort Claims Act gives individuals the right to sue the federal government, the government is generally not liable for intentional torts committed by its employees, as 28 U.S.C. § 2680(h) takes away that right for injuries arising out of assault or battery. However, the plaintiffs argued that the co-workers were the negligent party in allowing Carr to continue in his drunken stupor. The government would have been liable under Massachusetts law, and the government would have been liable if Carr were not a government employee. However, the District Court held that because Carr was a government employee, prior Fourth Circuit precedent was a bar to recovery. The Fourth Circuit upheld the decision of the trial court.

== Opinion of the Court ==
In a majority opinion by Justice Stevens, the Court noted that the injury arose from two claims: negligence by Carr's co-workers and assault by Carr.

In United States v. Muniz, 374 U.S. 150 (1963), the Supreme Court held that the intentional tort exception did not apply when prison guards were negligent in preventing a prisoner from assault. This case could have been decided because the claim arose out of the negligence of the prisoner guards, and the assault was just the natural causal effect of the negligence, or because the Supreme Court held that if the only issue was whether the Government should be held liable for Carr's action, the intentional tort exception would preclude litigation under the FTCA.

However, the "Government voluntarily adopted regulations that prohibit the possession of firearms on the naval base and that require personnel to report the present of any such firearm, and by further voluntarily undertaking to provide care to a person who was visibly drunk and visibly armed, the Government assumed responsibility to 'perform its good Samaritan task in a careful manner.'" Indian Towing Co. v. United States, 350 U.S. 61, 65 (1955).

Carr's status as a federal employee, as well as his act being intentional as opposed to negligent, was irrelevant since the co-workers' negligence was at issue.

== See also ==
- List of United States Supreme Court cases, volume 487
- List of United States Supreme Court cases
- Lists of United States Supreme Court cases by volume
- List of United States Supreme Court cases by the Rehnquist Court
