= Hicks v. Miranda =

- Supreme Court of the United States

Decided June 24, 1975
- Full case name: Hicks v. Miranda
- Citations: 422 U.S. 332 (more)

Holding
- The Anti-Injunction Act does apply to state criminal proceedings initiated after a federal complaint is filed but before there has been a "proceeding of substance on the merits" in federal court.

Court membership
- Chief Justice Warren E. Burger Associate Justices William O. Douglas · William J. Brennan Jr. Potter Stewart · Byron White; Thurgood Marshall · Harry Blackmun; Lewis F. Powell Jr. · William Rehnquist

Case opinions
- Majority: White
- Concurrence: Burger
- Dissent: Stewart, joined by Douglas, Brennan, Marshall

Laws applied
- Anti-Injunction Act

Hicks v. Miranda, 422 U.S. 332 (1975), was a United States Supreme Court case in which the Court held that the Anti-Injunction Act does apply to state criminal proceedings initiated after a federal complaint is filed but before there has been a "proceeding of substance on the merits" in federal court. The case involved the pornographic film Deep Throat.

== Significance ==
Among other things, this case emphasized that summary opinions from the Supreme Court can still have precedential value, even if that value is less than a full opinion. A summary opinion is one where the court simply announces its decision in a per curiam opinion, often with little reasoning. Hicks advises that such an opinion is binding "until such times as the Court informs [the lower courts] that [it is] not."

== See also ==
- Younger v. Harris
