= Sugar bowl (legal maxim) =

US legal maxim relating to search and seizure

In United States constitutional law and criminal procedure, the sugar bowl refers to a legal maxim relating to one of the restrictions on searches and seizures imposed by the Fourth Amendment to the United States Constitution. It specifically refers to the areas that may be searched in pursuit of the items stipulated in the warrant in relation to evidence of any other criminal acts which may be recovered.

The maxim (often quoted as "if you are looking for stolen televisions, you cannot look in sugar bowls") describes the relationship between what is described in a search warrant and the persons or things that may be validly searched as a consequence.

Under the law, only areas that could realistically contain the objects searched for can be searched, and therefore only evidence of other crimes found in those areas (or in plain sight) can be admitted.

== Overview ==
In the eponymous example, if the search warrant states that a stolen television is the object of the search, a law enforcement officer cannot look into a person's sugar bowl for what might be other stolen property because a television would not fit inside a sugar bowl. However, the officer may look into concealed areas where a television may be hidden, such as a closet, attic, or outside shed. On the other hand, if the search warrant stated that a stolen ring was the subject, since a ring can easily be concealed inside a sugar bowl, the officer may search inside the bowl.

An extension of this concept prevents searching through possessions that could not possibly be the object in question. If stolen televisions are exclusively the subject of the warrant then officers could not read through paperwork or the contents of computers found at the scene even if the televisions could reasonably be hidden among large stacks of paper or amongst computer equipment. Televisions could not be hidden inside a folder of papers, or stored on a hard drive, thus excluding those from being searched. Similarly, those executing the warrant may not use search techniques that are not specifically used to find the target. In the setting of a building, drug dogs cannot be used unless drugs are specified in the warrant, while outside, a metal detector could only be used if the item could be detected by it.

Generally these issues do not become relevant, as investigators are careful to apply for warrants that cover the maximum area that there is evidence for searching. If there is evidence to support the issuance of a warrant to find stolen televisions, investigators may apply for one that includes stolen televisions, parts of televisions, sums of cash and records of the sale of televisions, on the rationale that possession of a large number of stolen items constitutes evidence of participating in a trade in stolen objects. As cash can be stored in a sugar bowl, this allows for the search of almost everywhere. Conversely, such warrants risk becoming effective general warrants which are prohibited under the Fourth Amendment.

There are some cases where even a warrant that only specifies a single item to be searched for can reasonably be applied to almost every conceivable area, most notably illegal drugs which could be present in almost any quantity from milligrams to kilograms, thus reasonably being concealed in almost anything.

In effect, the sugar bowl is a reminder to law enforcement to carefully stipulate their warrants and not to use speculative warrants to search for evidence of crimes. Even if such evidence is found, if it is outside the scope of the areas the warrant permits then it is very likely to be excluded from trial as an illegal search and seizure.

== See also ==
- Fruit of the poisonous tree
