= Nix v. Williams =

- Supreme Court of the United States

Argued January 18, 1984 Decided June 11, 1984
- Full case name: Nix, Warden of the Iowa State Penitentiary v. Williams
- Docket no.: 82-1651
- Citations: 467 U.S. 431 (more) 104 S. Ct. 2501; 81 L. Ed. 2d 377

Case history
- Prior: Writ of habeas corpus denied, Williams v. Nix, 528 F. Supp. 664 (S.D. Iowa 1981); reversed, 700 F.2d 1164 (8th Cir. 1983); cert. granted, 461 U.S. 956 (1983).

Holding
- The evidence pertaining to the discovery and condition of the victim's body was properly admitted at respondent's second trial on the ground that it would ultimately or inevitably have been discovered even if no violation of any constitutional provision had taken place.

Court membership
- Chief Justice Warren E. Burger Associate Justices William J. Brennan Jr. · Byron White; Thurgood Marshall · Harry Blackmun; Lewis F. Powell Jr. · William Rehnquist; John P. Stevens · Sandra Day O'Connor

Case opinions
- Majority: Burger, joined by White, Blackmun, Powell, Rehnquist, O'Connor
- Concurrence: White
- Concurrence: Stevens (in the judgment)
- Dissent: Brennan, joined by Marshall

Laws applied
- U.S. Const. amend. IV

Nix v. Williams, 467 U.S. 431 (1984), was a U.S. Supreme Court case that recognized an "inevitable discovery" exception to the exclusionary rule. The exclusionary rule makes some evidence gathered through violations of the Fourth Amendment to the United States Constitution, which protects against unreasonable search and seizure, inadmissible in criminal trials as "fruit of the poisonous tree". In Nix, the Court ruled that evidence that would inevitably have been discovered by law enforcement through legal means remained admissible.

== Background ==
Robert Williams, an escaped mental patient, murdered ten-year-old Pamela Powers after kidnapping her from a YMCA in Des Moines, Iowa, on December 24, 1968. Her clothes were found at a rest stop on I-80. As hundreds of police officers and volunteers began to search the area for Pamela's body, Williams surrendered to police. He was arraigned in Davenport, Iowa. He was picked up by detectives from Des Moines who agreed to drive him to Des Moines to meet with an attorney who had convinced him to surrender. The detectives said they would not question him until he met with the attorney in Des Moines. One of the detectives escorting him began a conversation and proposed that Williams reveal where the body was before an impending snowfall; Williams agreed and led the detectives to Powers' body.

Williams was subsequently convicted of the murder, but in Brewer v. Williams (1977), the US Supreme Court ruled that his Sixth Amendment right to counsel had been violated based on the precedent of Massiah v. United States (1964). Williams' conviction was thereby reversed. Justice Potter Stewart's majority opinion, however, contained a footnote suggesting that the evidence provided by Williams could still be used in a trial:

While neither Williams' incriminating statements themselves nor any testimony describing his having led the police to the victim's body can constitutionally be admitted into evidence, evidence of where the body was found and of its condition might well be admissible on the theory that the body would have been discovered in any event, even had incriminating statements not been elicited from Williams. ... In the event that a retrial is instituted, it will be for the state courts in the first instance to determine whether particular items of evidence may be admitted.

Williams then received a second trial, in which his attorneys again moved to suppress all evidence stemming from the interrogation of Williams by the detectives. The judge ruled that Williams' statements to the detectives were inadmissible, but citing Stewart's footnote, ruled that the body was admissible as evidence, as it would have inevitably been discovered by law enforcement. On July 15, 1977, Williams was again convicted of first degree murder.

== Decision of the Court ==
The appeal of the second trial reached the Supreme Court in 1984. The majority opinion was written by Chief Justice Warren E. Burger, who was joined by Justices Byron White, Harry Blackmun, Lewis F. Powell, Jr., William Rehnquist, and Sandra Day O'Connor. Justices White and Stevens wrote concurring opinions, while Justice William J. Brennan, Jr. wrote a dissent in which he was joined by Thurgood Marshall.

The majority opinion found that an "inevitable discovery exception" to the exclusionary rule was constitutional, noting that such a rule was already standard practice in most state and federal courts. The Court stated that law enforcement was not required to demonstrate that it had violated a defendant's rights in good faith, only that the evidence would have inevitably been found despite the violation. Williams' conviction was thereby upheld.

Brennan's dissent agreed that an inevitable discovery exception existed, but argued that the burden of proof should be strengthened from the "preponderance of the evidence" required by the majority opinion to "clear and convincing evidence".

== See also ==
- List of United States Supreme Court cases by the Burger Court
