= Arizona v. Evans =

- Supreme Court of the United States

Argued December 7, 1994 Decided March 1, 1995
- Full case name: State of Arizona v. Isaac Evans
- Citations: 514 U.S. 1 (more) 115 S. Ct. 1185; 131 L. Ed. 2d 34

Case history
- Prior: Motion to suppress granted by trial court. Arizona Court of Appeals reverses 172 Ariz. 314, 317, 836 P.2d 1024, 1027 (1992). Arizona Supreme Court reverses. 177 Ariz. 201, 866 P.2d at 871 (1994).

Holding
- The exclusionary rule does not apply when an error in a warrant, or the misrepresented existence of a warrant, occurs due to the actions of personnel not enforcing the law, such as Court Clerks.

Court membership
- Chief Justice William Rehnquist Associate Justices John P. Stevens · Sandra Day O'Connor; Antonin Scalia · Anthony Kennedy; David Souter · Clarence Thomas; Ruth Bader Ginsburg · Stephen Breyer

Case opinions
- Majority: Rehnquist, joined by O'Connor, Scalia, Kennedy, Souter, Thomas, Breyer
- Concurrence: O'Connor, joined by Souter, Breyer
- Concurrence: Souter, joined by Breyer
- Dissent: Stevens
- Dissent: Ginsburg, joined by Stevens

Laws applied
- U.S. Const. amend. IV

Arizona v. Evans, 514 U.S. 1 (1995), was a United States Supreme Court case in which the Court instituted an exclusionary rule exception allowing evidence obtained through a warrantless search to be valid when a police record erroneously indicates the existence of an outstanding warrant due to negligent conduct of a Clerk of Court.

== Background ==
On December 13, 1990, a Justice of the Peace issued a warrant for the arrest of Isaac Evans (respondent), because respondent failed to appear to answer for several traffic violations. Six days later, respondent appeared by his own volition, and the Justice of the Peace marked respondent's file for the warrant to be "quashed". Under standard court procedure, a justice court clerk informs the Sheriff's Office of a quashed warrant, however this did not take place. Thus the warrant remained on file at the Sheriff's Office even though it was no longer valid.

On January 5, 1991, respondent is observed by Phoenix police officer Bryan Sargent driving the wrong way down a one-way street near the police station. When respondent was asked for his driver's license, respondent informed Sargent that it had been suspended. This prompted Sargent to check the data terminal in his patrol car for respondent's records. The record confirmed the respondent's license was suspended, and also showed the erroneous outstanding warrant for his arrest. Based on this warrant, Sargent proceeds to arrest respondent, and in the process of arrest, respondent drops a "hand-rolled cigarette that the officers determined smelled of marijuana." Sargent then searched respondent's car and discovered a bag of marijuana, and was charged with possession. When the Phoenix Police Department notified the Justice court of the arrest, they discovered the warrant had been quashed, and informed the police.

Respondent argued that his arrest was unlawful since the warrant for his arrest had been quashed 17 days prior, and the discovery of marijuana would not have happened without said arrest. Therefore, he filed a motion to suppress due to a violation of his Fourth Amendment rights, to which the exclusionary rule is a remedy. Furthermore, he argued that "the purposes of the exclusionary rule would be served here by making the clerks for the court ... more careful about making sure that warrants are removed from the records." The trial court agreed, granting respondent's motion on the grounds that it could find no "distinction between State action, whether it happens to be the police department or not."

Upon appeal, the Arizona Court of Appeals reversed the decision on a divided vote because it "believed that the exclusionary rule [was] not intended to deter justice court employees or Sheriff's Office employees who are not directly associated with the arresting officers or the arresting officers' police department."

The Arizona Supreme Court rejected this distinction, reasoning that the exclusionary rule would force criminal records to be kept more efficiently by those who maintain them, whether police or court staff.

== Majority Opinion ==
The Fourth Amendment guards against unreasonable searches and seizures. The exclusionary rule is not derived from the Fourth Amendment, rather it is the judicial remedy for a violation of the Fourth Amendment. Although the exclusionary rule was originally implemented as a guard for privacy rights, after United States v. Leon, it has been interpreted by the Supreme Court as a tool for deterring police misconduct.

In United States v. Leon, 468 U.S. 897 (1984), the Court had ruled that the exclusionary rule did not require the suppression of evidence seized pursuant to a search warrant that was later determined to be invalid. In Leon, the police's reliance on the validity of the search warrant was objectively reasonable; thus, excluding the evidence seized in that case would not have deterred any future misconduct on the part of the police. The exclusionary rule does not serve to deter illegal conduct on the part of judges, after all. For a similar reason, the Court in Evans ruled that the exclusionary rule should not require suppression of the evidence seized in this case.

Because court employees were responsible for the error, applying the exclusionary rule in this case would not deter future errors. First, the exclusionary rule was historically aimed at preventing police misconduct, not court clerical errors. Second, there is no evidence that court employees were motivated to "subvert the Fourth Amendment or that lawlessness among these actors requires application of the extreme sanction of exclusion." There had been testimony at a suppression hearing that the clerical error at issue in this case occurred once every three or four years—although, as Justice Ginsburg pointed out, that same witness had also admitted that the same error occurred three other times the same day. Finally, because court clerks are not actively involved in law enforcement, applying the exclusionary rule in this case would have little impact on the clerks responsible for entering data regarding outstanding warrants. Ultimately, there was no evidence that the officer acted unreasonably on the basis of the information he had at hand.

== Dissenting Opinions ==
Justice Stevens took issue with the notion that the exclusionary rule served to deter only police misconduct. Because the Fourth Amendment constrains the power of the sovereign, the exclusionary rule — the remedy for violating the Fourth Amendment — should "impose[] costs on that sovereign, motivating it to train all of its personnel to avoid future violations." Nor did Justice Stevens think that the exclusionary rule was an extreme sanction, for there is nothing extreme about allowing the sovereign to profit from its "negligent misconduct."

Stevens also distinguished this case from Leon. In Leon, there had been a presumably valid warrant issued at the time of the search; in this case there was none. Furthermore, there was some police conduct involved in maintaining the database on which the officer relied to determine whether there was, in fact, a warrant out for Evans's arrest. To say that the exclusionary rule did not apply in this situation was, therefore, not entirely accurate for Justice Stevens. Moreover, Stevens observed that there was no civil remedy under section 1983 for Fourth Amendment violations that result from erroneous information in police databases, either against the individual officer or against the city that employs him. "The offense to the dignity of the citizen who is arrested, handcuffed, and searched on a public street simply because some bureaucrat has failed to maintain an accurate computer data base strikes me as... outrageous." The fact that the police happened to find Evans's marijuana as a result of inaccurate information in the database had to be weighed against the interest of law-abiding citizens.

Justice Ginsburg argued that the case was not properly before the Court because it rested on an independent and adequate ground in Arizona law — its statute dealing with good-faith reliance on the validity of warrants. The Supreme Court's interference would therefore impede on Arizona's ability to act as a laboratory for legal innovations. The majority observed that part of the Arizona Supreme Court's decision did in fact rest on the exclusionary rule, so that the Court had jurisdiction to review the case.

== See also ==
- List of United States Supreme Court cases, volume 514
- List of United States Supreme Court cases
- Lists of United States Supreme Court cases by volume
- List of United States Supreme Court cases by the Rehnquist Court
- United States v. Leon
