= Murray v. United States =

- Supreme Court of the United States

Argued December 8, 1987 Decided June 27, 1988
- Full case name: Michael F. Murray v. United States
- Citations: 487 U.S. 533 (more) 108 S. Ct. 2529; 101 L. Ed. 2d 472

Holding
- The Fourth Amendment does not require the suppression of evidence initially discovered during police officers' illegal entry of private premises if that evidence is also discovered during a later search pursuant to a valid warrant that is wholly independent of the initial illegal entry.

Court membership
- Chief Justice William Rehnquist Associate Justices William J. Brennan Jr. · Byron White; Thurgood Marshall · Harry Blackmun; John P. Stevens · Sandra Day O'Connor; Antonin Scalia · Anthony Kennedy

Case opinions
- Majority: Scalia, joined by Rehnquist, White, Blackmun
- Dissent: Marshall, joined by Stevens, O'Connor
- Dissent: Stevens
- Brennan and Kennedy took no part in the consideration or decision of the case.

Laws applied
- U.S. Const. amend. IV

Murray v. United States, 487 U.S. 533 (1988), was a United States Supreme Court decision that created the modern "independent source doctrine" exception to the exclusionary rule. The exclusionary rule makes most evidence gathered through violations of the Fourth Amendment to the United States Constitution inadmissible in criminal trials as "fruit of the poisonous tree". In Murray, the Court ruled that when officers conduct two searches, the first unlawful and the second lawful, evidence seized during the second search is admissible if the second search "is genuinely independent of [the] earlier one."

== Background ==
The case arose out of the conviction of Michael F. Murray for conspiracy to possess and distribute illegal drugs. Based on information received from informants, federal law enforcement agents had been surveilling Murray. They observed Murray drive a truck into a warehouse. The agents saw the truck leave with another driver, and lawfully seized it. The agents found marijuana in the vehicle. After making this discovery, several agents illegally entered the warehouse. They found burlap bales in the warehouse. They did not reenter the warehouse until they received a warrant. In applying for the warrant, the agents did not mention their prior illegal entry.

== Opinion of the Court ==
Justice Scalia delivered the opinion of the Court in a 4-3 decision.

The majority opinion agreed with the government that "the independent source doctrine applies to evidence initially discovered during, or as a consequence of, an unlawful search but later obtained independently from activities untainted by the initial illegality." The Court found that a search pursuant to a warrant is not genuinely independent of evidence if (1) the agents' decision to seek the warrant was prompted by what they had seen during the initial [illegal] entry or (2) if information obtained during that entry was presented to the Magistrate and affected his decision to issue the warrant.

== See also ==
- List of United States Supreme Court cases, volume 487
- List of United States Supreme Court cases
- Lists of United States Supreme Court cases by volume
- List of United States Supreme Court cases by the Rehnquist Court
