= Wong Sun v. United States =

- Supreme Court of the United States

Argued March 29, April 2, 1962 Reargued October 8, 1962 Decided January 14, 1963
- Full case name: Wong Sun, et al. v. United States
- Citations: 371 U.S. 471 (more) 83 S. Ct. 407; 9 L. Ed. 2d 441; 1963 U.S. LEXIS 2431

Case history
- Prior: 288 F.2d 366 (9th Cir. 1961); cert. granted, 368 U.S. 817 (1961).

Holding
- The presentation of verbal evidence and recovered narcotics where they were both fruits of an illegal entry are inadmissible in court except where there is a break in chain of evidence.

Court membership
- Chief Justice Earl Warren Associate Justices Hugo Black · William O. Douglas; Tom C. Clark · John M. Harlan II; William J. Brennan Jr. · Potter Stewart; Byron White · Arthur Goldberg

Case opinions
- Majority: Brennan, joined by Warren, Black, Douglas, Goldberg
- Concurrence: Douglas
- Dissent: Clark, joined by Harlan, Stewart, White

Wong Sun v. United States, 371 U.S. 471 (1963), is a United States Supreme Court decision excluding the presentation of verbal evidence and recovered narcotics where they were both fruits of an illegal entry.

== Background ==
Narcotics agents unlawfully entered James Wah Toy's laundry at which point Toy indicated that Johnny Yee was selling narcotics. The drug agents then went to Yee and found the narcotics. Yee made a deal to give up his supplier, Wong Sun. The agents then arrested Wong Sun. All were arraigned and released on their own recognizance. Several days later, Wong Sun voluntarily returned to the police station to make a statement, during the process of which he confessed.

In a trial in a Federal District Court without a jury, they were convicted of fraudulent and knowing transportation and concealment of illegally imported heroin, in violation of 21 U.S.C. §174. Although the Court of Appeals held that the arrests of both petitioners without warrants were illegal, because not based on "probable cause" within the meaning of the Fourth Amendment nor "reasonable grounds" within the meaning of the Narcotics Control Act of 1956, it affirmed their convictions.

== Supreme Court ruling ==
The Supreme Court held that:

1. On the record in this case, there was neither reasonable grounds nor probable cause for Toy's arrest, since the information upon which it was based was too vague and came from too untested a source to accept it as probable cause for the issuance of an arrest warrant; and this defect was not cured by the fact that Toy fled when a supposed customer at his door early in the morning revealed that he was a narcotics agent.
2. On the record in this case, the statements made by Toy in his bedroom at the time of his unlawful arrest were the fruits of the agents' unlawful action, and they should have been excluded from evidence.
3. The narcotics taken from a third party as a result of statements made by Toy at the time of his arrest were likewise fruits of the unlawful arrest, and they should not have been admitted as evidence against Toy.
4. After exclusion of the foregoing items of improperly admitted evidence, the only proofs remaining to sustain Toy's conviction are his and his codefendant's unsigned statements; any admissions of guilt in Toy's statement require corroboration; no reference to Toy in his codefendant's statement constitutes admissible evidence corroborating any admission by Toy, and Toy's conviction must be set aside for lack of competent evidence to support it.
5. As, after his unlawful arrest, petitioner Wong Sun had been lawfully arraigned and released on his own recognizance and had returned voluntarily several days later when he made his unsigned statement, the connection between his unlawful arrest and the making of that statement was so attenuated that the unsigned statement was not the fruit of the unlawful arrest and, therefore, it was properly admitted in evidence.
6. The seizure of the narcotics admitted in evidence invaded no right of privacy of person or premises which would entitle Wong Sun to object to its use at his trial.
7. Any references to Wong Sun in his codefendant's statement were incompetent to corroborate Wong Sun's admissions, and Wong Sun is entitled to a new trial, because it is not clear from the record whether or not the trial court relied upon his codefendant's statement as a source of corroboration of Wong Sun's confession.

Toy's statements and the discovered drugs at Yee's should both be excluded as fruit of the poisonous tree because the search was done without a warrant. Wong Sun's lawyer argued that Wong Sun's confession should also be excluded as fruit of the poisonous tree. Wong Sun's statement was ruled admissible because he had no standing to move to suppress the evidence found in Yee's apartment. Wong Sun was granted a new trial, but his confession was admissible.
