= Fruit of the poisonous tree =

Evidence derived from illegal investigatory conduct

"Fruit of the poisonous tree" is a legal metaphor used to describe evidence that is obtained illegally. The logic of the terminology is that if the source (the "tree") of the evidence or evidence itself is tainted, then anything gained (the "fruit") from it is tainted as well.

== United States ==
The doctrine underlying the name was first described in Silverthorne Lumber Co. v. United States, 251 U.S. 385 (1920). The term's first use was by Justice Felix Frankfurter in Nardone v. United States (1939).

Such evidence is not generally admissible in court. For example, suppose a police officer obtained a key to a train station locker in the process of conducting a search of a home that was unconstitutional on the grounds that it violated the Fourth Amendment. Any evidence of a crime that came from that locker would most likely be excluded under the "fruit of the poisonous tree" legal doctrine. See also United States ex rel. Chennault v. Smith (1973). The testimony of a witness who is discovered through illegal means would not necessarily be excluded, however, due to the "attenuation doctrine", which allows certain evidence or testimony to be admitted in court if the link between the illegal police conduct and the resulting evidence or testimony is sufficiently attenuated. For example, a witness who freely and voluntarily testifies is enough of an independent intervening factor to sufficiently "attenuate" the connection between the government's illegal discovery of the witness and the witness's voluntary testimony itself (United States v. Ceccolini, 435 U.S. 268 (1978)).

The "fruit of the poisonous tree" doctrine is an extension of the exclusionary rule, which, subject to some exceptions, prevents evidence obtained in violation of the Fourth Amendment from being admitted in a criminal trial. Like the exclusionary rule, the fruit of the poisonous tree doctrine is intended to deter police from using illegal means to obtain evidence.

The doctrine is subject to four main exceptions. The tainted evidence is admissible if:

1. It was discovered in part as a result of an independent, untainted source; or
2. It would inevitably have been discovered despite the tainted source; or
3. The chain of causation between the illegal action and the tainted evidence is too attenuated; or
4. The search warrant was not found to be valid based on probable cause but was executed by government agents in good faith (good-faith exception).

== Contrasting doctrine ==
=== Australia ===
The American doctrine of the fruit of the poisonous tree has generally been rejected by the courts and legislators in Australia. Courts have tended to reject evidence where there is serious risk of unreliability, but where evidence is obtained unlawfully or improperly, the interest in deterring the police from unlawful, improper, or unfair treatment of the accused is balanced against the public interest in ensuring that those who commit crimes are brought to justice, and the seriousness of the crimes committed. Improperly obtained evidence is therefore several times more likely to be excluded from less serious offences like drug possession or disorderly conduct than from more serious ones like robbery and murder.

=== England and Wales ===
There is no comparable rule in English law. English courts have relied on the Court of Appeal case R v Leathem (1861) 8 Cox CC 498 to admit evidence irrespective of the legality of the source. This is the general stance. A specific carve out exists in relation to confessions and admissions, which trial judges have a discretion to exclude. (R v Sang (Leonard Anthony))

It matters not how you get it; if you steal it even, it would be admissible in evidence.

— R v Leathem (1861) 8 Cox CC 498

Courts nonetheless have wide discretion under section 78 of the Police and Criminal Evidence Act 1984 to exclude evidence if its admission would render the proceedings unfair. In particular, courts are defined to be a public authority within the meaning of section 6 of the Human Rights Act 1998 and as such are more likely to exclude evidence when admitting it would breach a person's human rights under the European Convention. They are not, however, required always to exclude such evidence; for example, in Jones v University of Warwick [2000] WLR 954, the Court of Appeal found that the trial court could exercise its discretion to admit evidence obtained by trespass and unlawful surveillance, in breach of Article 8. In A v Home Secretary (No 2) [2005] UKHL 71 the House of Lords found that the United Kingdom's obligations under Article 15 of the United Nations Convention Against Torture, from which no derogations are permitted, required that evidence obtained by a breach of Article 3 (i.e. torture) was absolutely inadmissible.

Although evidence gathered by illegal means may be admissible, those illegal means may nonetheless expose the party seeking to rely on it to legal risks such as prosecution, civil action, or abrogation of legal professional privilege (Dubai Aluminium Company Ltd v Al Alawi [1998] EWHC J1203-3).

=== India ===
Drawing on the English tradition, the doctrine does not have a parallel in India and courts will admit evidence, even if it is illegally obtained (stolen, etc.), especially if it will help prove guilt or innocence. While the quality of the evidence may be suspect, the position that the evidence should not be considered at all is not a position Indian courts take.

There are other considerations as to the admissibility of the evidence, such as whether it was extracted under duress or other violation of human rights including privacy in modern times, or "if its prejudicial effect on the jury was likely to outweigh its probative value". However, this article deals only about cognizance in case the source of the evidence itself may be unlawful.

The Supreme Court of India, the highest appellate and constitutional court of India, has dealt with the matter multiple times, decisively so in 1971, ruling against the applicability of this doctrine in India.

In the 2019 Rafale deal controversy, the Attorney General K. K. Venugopal argued in front of a three-member bench of the court, which included the sitting Chief Justice, that official, classified documents stolen from the government – which happened to be integral to the case in question – should not be taken cognizance of by the court, as they were classified, and the stealth and subsequent leakage to a newspaper was a crime under the Official Secrets Act. K M Joseph, from the bench, noted that "even stolen evidence can be looked into by the Court. It is well settled under Evidence Act", while the Chief Justice, Ranjan Gogoi, queried whether it would be correct for the court to ignore the claim of an alibi (of an accused) if it were based on stolen evidence. The third constituent of the bench, Sanjay Kaul, further noted that even if the Attorney General's argument were correct, any evidence would be admissible if it would shock the conscience of the court.

Admissibility of evidence in Indian courts hinges primarily on relevance and then on the source. The Supreme Court, especially, is empowered by the Constitution of India to have any document produced before it. In fact, in the 1971 verdict touched upon above, the Supreme Court decision relies on R v Leathem (1861).

However, considerations of protection against self-incrimination – a right guaranteed by the Constitution – are taken into account and evidence obtained under duress will be grounds to reject its validity, but not the legality of the source alone.

=== Ireland ===
In Ireland the only absolute prohibition on admitting illegally obtained evidence is where the evidence was knowingly obtained in breach of constitutional rights. Evidence obtained in breach of constitutional rights where this breach was inadvertent, or where it was illegal but not in breach of constitutional rights, may be admitted.

=== Sweden ===
The judicial system in Sweden follows a principle of fri bevisprövning, "free examination of evidence", where all sides may announce and use any and all evidence available, regardless of the source or how it was obtained. It is then up to the court to evaluate the evidence. If a crime was committed when acquiring the evidence, it may still be used in the trial and the accused party may still be tried later for the crime. At the same time, the court may take the crime into consideration when evaluating the value and impact of the evidence.

=== Poland ===
The judicial system in Poland does not prohibit illegally sourced evidence, unless the source of such evidence is an act of misconduct (referring to gross misconduct in such a case) committed by an entrusted public official such as a police officer, obtained through methods such as torture, a homicide, and unlawful imprisonment.

== See also ==
- Commonwealth v. Matos
- Silverthorne Lumber Co. v. United States
- Mapp v. Ohio, 367 U.S. 643 (1961)
- Wong Sun v. United States, 371 U.S. 471 (1963)
- Nix v. Williams, 467 U.S. 431 (1984)
- Ex turpi causa non oritur actio
- Parallel construction
- Sugar bowl (legal maxim)
- Section 24(2) of the Canadian Charter of Rights and Freedoms
