= Independent source doctrine =

Exception to the exclusionary rule

In US law, the independent source doctrine is an exception to the exclusionary rule. The doctrine applies to evidence initially discovered during, or as a consequence of, an unlawful search, but later obtained independently from activities untainted by the initial illegality.

The United States Supreme Court, in Nix v. Williams, provided the policy rationale for admitting tainted evidence:

The independent source doctrine teaches us that the interest of society in deterring unlawful conduct and the public interest in having juries receive all probative evidence of a crime are properly balanced by putting the police in the same, not a worse, position that they would have been in if no police error or misconduct had occurred.

The United States Supreme Court, in Murray v. United States provided the current independent source doctrine rule. The Murray court held that a state may not rely on the independent source doctrine if (1) the agents' decision to seek the warrant was prompted by what they had seen during the initial entry or (2) if information obtained during that entry was presented to the Magistrate and affected his decision to issue the warrant.

== "Expanded" independent source doctrine ==
The expanded independent source doctrine refers to situations where states invoke the independent source doctrine, and courts admit partially tainted warrants if the untainted information in the warrant is enough to establish probable cause.
