= United States v. Leon =

- Supreme Court of the United States

Argued January 17, 1984 Decided July 5, 1984
- Full case name: United States v. Leon et al.
- Citations: 468 U.S. 897 (more) 104 S. Ct. 3405, 82 L. Ed. 2d 677, 1984 U.S. LEXIS 153

Case history
- Prior: 701 F.2d 187 (9th Cir. 1983); cert. granted, 463 U.S. 1206 (1983).

Holding
- Established that evidence obtained in good faith by police relying upon a search warrant that subsequently is found to be deficient may be used in a criminal trial.

Court membership
- Chief Justice Warren E. Burger Associate Justices William J. Brennan Jr. · Byron White; Thurgood Marshall · Harry Blackmun; Lewis F. Powell Jr. · William Rehnquist; John P. Stevens · Sandra Day O'Connor

Case opinions
- Majority: White, joined by Burger, Blackmun, Powell, Rehnquist, O'Connor
- Concurrence: Blackmun
- Dissent: Brennan, joined by Marshall
- Dissent: Stevens

Laws applied
- U.S. Const. amend. IV

United States v. Leon, 468 U.S. 897 (1984), was a United States Supreme Court case in which the Court established the "good faith" exception to the Fourth Amendment exclusionary rule.

== Background ==
In August 1981, police in Burbank, California received a tip identifying Patsy Stewart and Armando Sanchez as drug dealers. Police began surveillance of their homes and followed leads based on the cars that frequented the residences. The police identified Ricardo Del Castillo and Alberto Leon as also being involved in the operation.

Based on this surveillance and information from a second informant, a detective wrote an affidavit and a judge issued a search warrant. The police conducted the search, but the search warrant was later found to be invalid because the police lacked the probable cause for a warrant to be issued in the first place. The evidence obtained in the search was upheld anyway, because the police performed the search in reliance on the warrant, meaning they acted in good faith. This became known as the good faith exception to the exclusionary rule.

== Decision ==
=== Majority ===
The Supreme Court announced its decision on July 5, 1984, with Justice Byron White filing for the 6–3 majority in favor of the United States, with Justice Harry Blackmun writing a concurring opinion.

First, the exclusionary rule is designed to deter police misconduct rather than to punish magistrates and judges for their errors. Only when a warrant is grounded upon an affidavit knowingly or recklessly false has the Court suppressed the evidence obtained as a result. Second, there exists no evidence that judges and magistrates are inclined to ignore the Fourth Amendment of the Constitution and that their actions would require the ultimate sanction of exclusion. Third, there is no evidence that suppression of evidence obtained under a search warrant will have any deterrent effect upon judges and magistrates. Judges and magistrates are not adjuncts to law enforcement officials and as such are neutral and have no stake in the outcome of criminal prosecutions.

The suppression of evidence obtained pursuant to a search warrant should be ordered only on a case-by-case basis and only in those instances where exclusion would promote the purposes of the exclusionary rule. An officer acting in good faith and within the scope of a search warrant should not be subjected to Fourth Amendment constitutional violations. It is the magistrate’s or judge’s responsibility to ascertain whether the warrant is supported by sufficient information to support probable cause. However, the officer’s reliance must be objectively reasonable. Suppression remains an appropriate remedy where the magistrate was misled by information in an affidavit that the affiant knew was false or would have known was false except for his reckless disregard for the truth.

In his concurrence, Justice Blackmun wrote, "If it should emerge from experience that, contrary to our expectations, the good faith exception to the exclusionary rule results in a material change in police compliance with the Fourth Amendment of the Constitution, we shall have to reconsider what we have undertaken here."

=== Dissent ===
Justice William Brennan filed a dissenting opinion, joined by Justice Thurgood Marshall, arguing that the Fourth Amendment of the Constitution must be read to condemn not only the initial unconstitutional invasion of privacy, but also the subsequent use of any illegally obtained evidence. The exclusionary rule was part and parcel of the Fourth Amendment’s limitation upon governmental encroachment of individual privacy. The Court’s only support for its decision is that even though the costs of exclusion are not very substantial, the potential deterrent effect in these circumstances is so marginal that exclusion cannot be justified. The chief deterrent function of the rule is its tendency to promote institutional compliance with the Fourth Amendment of the Constitution. Justice John Paul Stevens filed a separate dissenting opinion.

== Note ==
Arguing the case for the respondent was former Los Angeles prosecutor and ESPN legal analyst Roger Cossack.

== See also ==
- List of United States Supreme Court cases, volume 468
- Olmstead v. United States (1928)
- Mapp v. Ohio (1961)
- Aguilar v. Texas (1964)
- Spinelli v. United States (1969)
- Illinois v. Gates (1983)
