= Bivens v. Six Unknown Named Agents =

- Supreme Court of the United States

Argued January 12, 1971 Decided June 21, 1971
- Full case name: Webster Bivens v. Six Unknown Named Agents of Federal Bureau of Narcotics
- Citations: 403 U.S. 388 (more) 91 S. Ct. 1999; 29 L. Ed. 2d 619; 1971 U.S. LEXIS 23
- Argument: Oral argument

Case history
- Prior: Dismissed, 276 F. Supp. 12 (E.D.N.Y. 1967); affirmed, 409 F.2d 718 (2d Cir. 1969)
- Subsequent: On remand, reversed, 456 F.2d 1339 (2d Cir. 1972)

Holding
- Individuals have an implied cause of action against federal government officials who have violated their constitutional rights. Second Circuit Court of Appeals reversed and remanded.

Court membership
- Chief Justice Warren E. Burger Associate Justices Hugo Black · William O. Douglas; John M. Harlan II · William J. Brennan Jr. Potter Stewart · Byron White; Thurgood Marshall · Harry Blackmun

Case opinions
- Majority: Brennan, joined by Douglas, Stewart, White, Marshall
- Concurrence: Harlan (in judgment)
- Dissent: Burger
- Dissent: Black
- Dissent: Blackmun

Laws applied
- U.S. Const. amend. IV

Bivens v. Six Unknown Named Agents, 403 U.S. 388 (1971), was a case in which the US Supreme Court ruled that an implied cause of action existed for an individual whose Fourth Amendment protection against unreasonable search and seizures had been violated by the Federal Bureau of Narcotics. The victim of such a deprivation could sue for the violation of the Fourth Amendment itself despite the lack of any federal statute authorizing such a suit. The existence of a remedy for the violation was implied by the importance of the right violated.

The case was understood to create a cause of action against the federal government similar to the one in 42 U.S.C. § 1983 against the states. However, the Supreme Court has sharply limited new Bivens claims.

The Supreme Court has upheld Bivens claims only three times: in Bivens (1971), Davis v. Passman (1979), and Carlson v. Green (1980). Under Ziglar v. Abbasi (2017) and Egbert v. Boule (2022), any claim that is not highly similar to the facts in Bivens (excessive force during arrest), Davis (sex discrimination in federal employment), or Carlson (inadequate care in prison) is a "new context" to which Bivens will not be extended if "there is any reason to think that Congress might be better equipped to create a damages remedy."

== Background ==
On November 26, 1965, Federal Bureau of Narcotics (FBN) agents searched the Brooklyn home of the plaintiff, Webster Bivens, and arrested him without a warrant. Drug charges were filed but were later dismissed by a US commissioner (now called magistrate judge). Bivens filed a lawsuit alleging the violation of his Fourth Amendment protection from unreasonable search and seizure. The government argued that the privacy rights the plaintiff claimed were based on state law, and any claim for damages should be brought in state court. The government also contended that the Fourth Amendment does not provide a cause of action for damages, but rather serves "merely to limit the extent to which the agents could defend the state law tort suit by asserting that their actions were a valid exercise of federal power". Bivens argued that a cause of action could be inferred because constitutional protections would be meaningless without a way to seek a remedy for their violation.

The district court agreed with the government and dismissed the suit for lack of subject-matter jurisdiction and for Bivens's failure to state a claim upon which relief can be granted. The Second Circuit Court of Appeals affirmed. The Supreme Court granted certiorari on the secondary issue of whether a plaintiff can bring a claim in federal court based solely on an alleged violation of his Fourth Amendment rights.

Bivens was represented pro bono by Stephen A. Grant.

== Decision ==
The Supreme Court, in an opinion by Justice Brennan, laid down a rule that it will infer a private right of action for monetary damages where no other federal remedy is provided for the vindication of a constitutional right, based on the principle that "for every wrong, there is a remedy". The court reasoned based upon a presumption that where there is a violation of a right, the plaintiff can recover whatever he could recover under any civil action, unless Congress has expressly curtailed that right of recovery, or there exist some "special factors counselling hesitation".

=== Concurrence ===
Justice Harlan voted with the majority to reverse the lower court but also wrote a separate concurring opinion.

For the reasons set forth below, I am of the opinion that federal courts do have the power to award damages for violation of 'constitutionally protected interests' and I agree with the Court that a traditional judicial remedy such as damages is appropriate to the vindication of the personal interests protected by the Fourth Amendment.

Harlan particularly emphasized the special importance of constitutional rights. He presented that it was well-settled, even undeniable, that a suit for injunction based on a constitutional right had been long recognized in the Federal courts. However, a suit for damages should be as or more acceptable.

=== Dissents ===
Dissenting opinions were written by Chief Justice Burger and by Justices Black and Blackmun.

Chief Justice Burger asserted the decision was legislating in an area that should be left to Congress. Justice Black basically agreed with Justice Burger and was worried about the growing docket. Justice Blackmun went a step further, saying the decision "opens the door for another avalanche of new federal cases".

== Subsequent case law ==
- Butz v. Economou, 438 U.S. 478 (1978)
- In Davis v. Passman, 442 U.S. 228 (1979), the Supreme Court upheld a Fifth Circuit opinion that held that even though there existed "an explicit congressional prohibition against judicial remedies for those in petitioner's position", the Court declined to infer that Congress also sought to foreclose an alternative remedy directly under the Fifth Amendment.
- Stafford v. Briggs, 444 U.S. 527 (1980)
- In Carlson v. Green, 446 U.S. 14 (1980), the court held that a damages remedy would be available despite the absence of any statute conferring such a right, unless: (1) Congress had provided an alternative remedy which it "explicitly declared to be a substitute for recovery directly under the Constitution"; or (2) the defendant could demonstrate any "special factors counseling hesitation".
- Chappell v. Wallace, 462 U.S. 296 (1983)
- In Bush v. Lucas, 462 U.S. 367 (1983), the Court refrained from implying a Bivens remedy due to the availability of alternative remedies for the first time.
- Mitchell v. Forsyth, 472 U.S. 511 (1985)
- Anderson v. Creighton, 483 U.S. 635 (1987)
- United States v. Stanley, 483 U.S. 669 (1987)
- Schweiker v. Chilicky, 487 U.S. 412 (1988)
- Siegert v. Gilley, 500 U.S. 226 (1991)
- McCarthy v. Madigan, 503 U.S. 140 (1992)
- In FDIC v. Meyer, 510 U.S. 471 (1994), and Correctional Services Corporation v. Malesko, 534 U.S. 61 (2001), the court held that the fundamental logic supporting Bivens was to deter constitutional violations by individual officers, not federal agencies.
- Farmer v. Brennan, 511 U.S. 825 (1994)
- Wilson v. Layne, 526 U.S. 603 (1999)
- Saucier v. Katz, 533 U.S. 194 (2001)
- Christopher v. Harbury, 536 U.S. 403 (2002)
- Hartman v. Moore, 547 U.S. 250 (2006)
- In Wilkie v. Robbins, 551 U.S. 537 (2007), the court held that the difficulty inherent in "defining limits to legitimate zeal on the public's behalf in situations where hard bargaining is to be expected" was a "special factor" that counseled against the availability of a Bivens remedy.
- Ashcroft v. Iqbal, 556 U.S. 662 (2009)
- Hui v. Castaneda, 559 U.S. 799 (2010)
- Ashcroft v. al-Kidd, 563 U.S. 731 (2011)
- In Minneci v. Pollard, 565 U.S. 118 (2012), the court denied a Bivens action for Eighth Amendment violations committed by employees of a private prison because "state tort law authorizes adequate alternative damages actions ... that provide both significant deterrence and compensation", despite acknowledging that these officials were "act[ing] under color of federal law".
- Reichle v. Howards, 566 U.S. 658 (2012)
- Wood v. Moss, 572 U.S. 744 (2014)
- Ziglar v. Abbasi, 582 U.S. 120 (2017)
- Hernandez v. Mesa, 582 U.S. 548 (2017)
- Hernandez v. Mesa, 589 U.S. 93 (2020)
- Brownback v. King, 592 U.S. 209 (2021)
- Egbert v. Boule, 596 U.S. 482 (2022)
- Goldey v. Fields, No. 24-809, 606 U.S. 942 (2025)
- Nielsen v. Watanabe, No. 25-417, ___ U.S. ___ (2027)

== Subsequent developments ==
=== Scholarship on Bivens success rate ===
According to Alexander A. Reinert, law professor at the Benjamin N. Cardozo School of Law of Yeshiva University, many attorneys assumed Bivens claims were far less successful than other civil rights litigation. However, Reinert's research, published in 2010, showed outcomes for plaintiffs more promising than had been assumed: "Depending on the procedural posture, presence of counsel, and type of case", success ranged from "16% to more than 40%", and that "when Bivens claims fail, it very rarely is because of the qualified immunity defense."

=== Egbert v. Boule ===
The Supreme Court granted certiorari to hear Egbert v. Boule, 596 U.S. 482 (2022), in November 2021, which was expected to review extensions of Bivens related remedies. The case involved a lawsuit filed by Robert Boule, the owner of an inn at the U.S.-Canada border against U.S. Border Patrol agent Erik Egbert related to a 2014 incident. In the incident, after Boule asked Egbert to leave his property when Egbert had approached a Turkish man about his immigration status, Egbert pushed Boule to the ground. Boule complained to the Border Patrol, which in turn led Egbert to prompt the Internal Revenue Service to investigate Boule. Boule claimed his First and Fourth Amendment rights were violated under Bivens. The district court found against Boule, asserting his claims were an inappropriate extension of Bivens, but the Ninth Circuit reversed.

In the 6–3 decision in Egbert v. Boule, the Supreme Court of the United States decided that the authority of the court to find a course of action under Bivens does not extend to Robert Boule's claim of excessive force under the Fourth Amendment to the United States Constitution and his First Amendment retaliation claim.

=== State actions ===
In December 2025, the state of Illinois passed the Illinois Bivens Act, stating that lawsuits can be filed “against any person who, while conducting civil immigration enforcement, knowingly engages in conduct that violates the Illinois Constitution or the United States Constitution.” As of February 2026, other states are considering similar bills, such as California's "No Kings Act" and New Jersey's "Fight Unlawful Conduct and Keep Individuals and Communities Empowered Act.”

== See also ==
- Qualified immunity
- List of United States Supreme Court cases, volume 403
- Westfall Act
