= Burlington Northern Railroad Co. v. Woods =

- Supreme Court of the United States

Argued November 4, 1986 Decided February 24, 1987
- Full case name: Burlington Northern Railroad Co. v. Woods, et al.
- Citations: 480 U.S. 1 (more) 107 S. Ct. 967; 94 L. Ed. 2d 1; 55 U.S.L.W. 4173; 6 Fed. R. Serv. 3d (Callaghan) 1035

Holding
- The Alabama mandatory affirmance penalty statute has no application to judgments entered by federal courts sitting in diversity.

Court membership
- Chief Justice William Rehnquist Associate Justices William J. Brennan Jr. · Byron White; Thurgood Marshall · Harry Blackmun; Lewis F. Powell Jr. · John P. Stevens; Sandra Day O'Connor · Antonin Scalia

Case opinion
- Majority: Marshall, joined by unanimous

Laws applied
- Rule 38 of the Federal Rules of Appellate Procedure, 28 U.S.C. § 1912

Burlington Northern Railroad Co. v. Woods, 480 U.S. 1 (1987), was a United States Supreme Court case that applied the precedent of Hanna v. Plumer to a conflict between state and federal procedural rules for a federal court sitting in diversity.

== Opinion of the Court ==
The defendant in the original case stayed a damage judgment and went on to lose on appeal. According to an Alabama statute, the defendant would be required to pay a ten percent penalty. Under Federal Rules of Appellate Procedure Rule 38, the penalty was discretionary. Holding the federal rule to be on point and constitutional, the court applied federal rule and gave no penalty.
