= Hanna v. Plumer =

- Supreme Court of the United States

Argued January 21, 1965 Decided April 26, 1965
- Full case name: Eddie V. Hanna v. Edward M. Plumer, Jr., Executor
- Citations: 380 U.S. 460 (more) 85 S. Ct. 1136; 14 L. Ed. 2d 8; 1965 U.S. LEXIS 1350; 9 Fed. R. Serv. 2d (Callaghan) 1

Case history
- Prior: Judgment for defendant, D. Mass., October 17, 1963; affirmed, 331 F.2d 157 (1st Cir. 1964)

Holding
- The adequacy of service of process in federal diversity jurisdiction cases should be measured by the Federal Rules of Civil Procedure, not state rules. First Circuit Court of Appeals reversed.

Court membership
- Chief Justice Earl Warren Associate Justices Hugo Black · William O. Douglas; Tom C. Clark · John M. Harlan II; William J. Brennan Jr. · Potter Stewart; Byron White · Arthur Goldberg

Case opinions
- Majority: Warren, joined by Douglas, Clark, Brennan, Stewart, White, Goldberg
- Concurrence: Black (without separate opinion)
- Concurrence: Harlan

Laws applied
- Fed. R. Civ. P. 4; Mass. Gen. Laws, c. 197, § 9 (1958).

Hanna v. Plumer, 380 U.S. 460 (1965), was a decision by the Supreme Court of the United States, in which the Court further refined the Erie doctrine regarding when and by what means federal courts are obliged to apply state law in cases brought under diversity jurisdiction. The question in the instant case was whether Federal Rules of Civil Procedure governing service of process should yield to state rules governing the service of process in diversity cases. The Court ruled that under the facts of this case, federal courts shall apply the federal rule. The decision was drafted by John Hart Ely, who was then a law clerk for Earl Warren.

== Background of the case ==
On February 6, 1963, petitioner, a citizen of Ohio, filed her complaint in the District Court for the District of Massachusetts, claiming damages in excess of $10,000 for personal injuries resulting from an automobile accident in South Carolina, allegedly caused by the negligence of one Louise Plumer Osgood, a Massachusetts citizen deceased at the time of the filing of the complaint. Respondent, Mrs. Osgood's executor and also a Massachusetts citizen, was named as defendant. The Massachusetts rule at the time required personal service of process on the executor of an in-state defendant, while Fed. R. Civ. P. 4 (d)(1) required only that service be made on a competent adult who resides at the residence of the defendant. The plaintiff left process at the residence of the executor, and so complied with the federal rule but not the state rule. The District Court granted summary judgment to the executor for the plaintiff's failure to make adequate service of process, ruling that the state rule applied based on the Supreme Court's prior precedents. The United States Court of Appeals for the First Circuit affirmed.

== The Court's decision ==
Chief Justice Earl Warren delivered the majority opinion, which held that the adoption of rule 4(d)(1) did not overstep the constitutional boundaries or the legislative intent of Congress in enacting the Rules Enabling Act (28 U.S.C. 2072) noting that "...the test must be whether a rule really regulates procedure..." Thus it was appropriate to apply Rule 4(d)(1) (now FRCP (4)(e)(2)) and not Massachusetts law in the Federal District Court. In reaching this decision the Court stated that the rule that state and federal courts should reach outcomes substantially the same was not a "talisman" and that there were more basic principles governing Erie Railroad Co. v. Tompkins and its progeny (that is, cases dealing with how Federal courts should apply state law). The purpose of Erie was to 1) discourage "forum shopping" and 2) avoid inequitable administration of laws. The instant case must be viewed in this light. While the outcome of the current case is determined by which law is applied, the rights in question are not substantial enough to create problems of unequal protection and because in Erie and its progeny there was no explicit conflict between state and federal rules. Thus, in those cases the Court held not that state rules trumped federal rules but that the federal rules, narrowly construed, did not cover the dispute whereas in the current case the federal and state laws are in direct conflict and the court has been instructed to follow the Federal Rule in these cases and there is no constitutional reason not to do so. In short, outcome determinative judgments are important under the American legal system for deciding if a state or federal rule applies but in the current case denying the federal rule would remove any power whatsoever the federal courts have over their procedures. Harlan argued that forum shopping and equitable administration of laws were not the only concerns in Erie because public uncertainty over which laws govern would be debilitating and therefore state law controls where it is an issue of affecting "primary decisions respecting human conduct." Under this understanding federal laws could be trumped by a state law, whether substantive or procedural law, meaning that Harlan's test is somewhere in between the "outcome determinative test" which gives extreme deference to state laws and the "forum shopping/equitable administration test" given in the case at hand, which states that a party must "substantially" raise equal protection issues.

== See also ==
- Erie Doctrine
- List of United States Supreme Court cases, volume 380
- John Hart Ely
- Walker v. Armco Steel Corp. (applying Hanna's analysis to Fed. R. Civ. P. 3's effect on the tolling of statutes of limitations)
- Burlington Northern Railroad Co. v. Woods (applying Hanna's analysis to Fed. R. Civ. P. 38's grant of discretion to judges in administering penalties for frivolous appeals in light of Alabama's mandatory penalty)
- Stewart Organization, Inc. v. Ricoh Corp. (applying Hanna's analysis to 28 USC 1404 (change of venue) in light of Alabama's policy against forum selection clauses)
