= Cuyler v. Sullivan =

- Supreme Court of the United States

Argued February 20, 1980 Decided May 12, 1980
- Full case name: Cuyler v. Sullivan
- Docket no.: 78-1832
- Citations: 446 U.S. 335 (more) 100 S. Ct. 1708

Case history
- Prior: Respondent convicted in Pennsylvania Court of Common Pleas; convictions affirmed by the Superior Court of Pennsylvania and the Supreme Court of Pennsylvania, 446 Pa. 419, 286 A. 2d 898 (1971); state collateral relief denied 472 Pa. 129, 371 A. 2d 468 (1977); habeas corpus granted, 593 F.2d 512 (3d Cir. 1979).

Holding
- To demonstrate a violation of the Sixth Amendment right to effective counsel due to a conflict of interest, a defendant who did not object at trial must show that an actual conflict of interest adversely affected the lawyer's performance. Trial courts are not required to inquire into the propriety of multiple representation, but have the discretion to do so.

Court membership
- Chief Justice Warren E. Burger Associate Justices William J. Brennan Jr. · Potter Stewart; Byron White · Thurgood Marshall; Harry Blackmun · Lewis F. Powell Jr. William Rehnquist · John P. Stevens

Case opinions
- Majority: Powell, joined by Burger, Stewart, White, Blackmun, Rehnquist, Stevens
- Concurrence: Brennan
- Dissent: Marshall

Laws applied
- U.S. Const. amend. VI

Cuyler v. Sullivan, 446 U.S. 335 (1980) was a Supreme Court case that established the standard for reviewing a defendant's claim that they were denied their Sixth Amendment right to the effective assistance of counsel due to their lawyer's representation of multiple defendants with conflicting interests (a "multiple representation" or "conflict of interest" case).

The right to counsel, applicable to the states through the Fourteenth Amendment, guarantees more than the mere appointment of a lawyer. In a series of precedents, the Supreme Court has recognized the constitutional right to meaningful and effective legal assistance. In Cuyler v. Sullivan the Supreme Court addressed the distinct responsibilities of defense counsel and the trial court regarding multiple representation.

== Background ==
John Sullivan was tried for murder with two co-defendants at separate trials. Sullivan was convicted of first-degree murder. During the subsequent appeals process, the accounts of the attorneys involved were inconsistent, which complicated the factual record. The trial lawyer, G. Fred DiBona, testified that he and A. Charles Peruto, Jr. had worked as "associate counsel" throughout the trials of all three defendants. Peruto, however, recalled a different arrangement, stating that while he was the lead counsel for two of the defendants, he had only acted in an assisting capacity during Sullivan's specific trial.

Most critically, even though the prosecution did not have a strong case against him, Sullivan himself did not testify and no witnesses were called in his defense. DiBona claimed he had actually encouraged Sullivan to testify because the prosecution's case was weak. Peruto stated that he had argued against putting on any defense for Sullivan, explicitly because he did not want to expose the defense's witnesses or strategies for the two upcoming trials of the other co-defendants. One of the co-defendant's later said he would have testified for Sullivan's defense if he had been called.

After exhausting his state remedies, Sullivan next filed a habeas corpus petition in federal court. The federal appeals court (Third Circuit Court of Appeals) agreed with Sullivan.

The appellate court determined that DiBona and Peruto represented all three defendants throughout the legal proceedings. Applying a lenient standard that was protective of defendant's rights, the court found that the decision to rest Sullivan's case without presenting any evidence was enough to create the possibility of a conflict, even though it could have been a legitimate tactic for an independent lawyer.

== Supreme Court ==
The Supreme Court reversed the decision of the Court of Appeals, establishing a stricter legal standard for proving a Sixth Amendment violation in conflict-of-interest cases.

=== Decision ===
The right to counsel exists to prevent the state from conducting trials where an accused person must face the prospect of incarceration without meaningful and effective legal help, whether counsel is retained or appointed by the state. The Court clarified the distinct responsibilities of defense counsel and the trial court regarding multiple representation. It reaffirmed that under Holloway v. Arkansas, multiple representation is not unconstitutional unless it creates a conflict of interest.

The Court reasoned that judges must necessarily rely on the professional judgment and good faith of defense counsel, who are in the best position to identify a conflict. The Sixth Amendment does not place a blanket duty on state courts to proactively investigate potential conflicts in every case involving a shared lawyer, but a trial judge must properly consider objections raised by the defendant.

A defendant who has not raised a timely objection in the trial court must meet a two-part test: they must prove that an "actual conflict of interest" existed and that this conflict "adversely affected his lawyer's performance."

Sullivan argued he met this new standard, pointing to Peruto's admission that the defense was rested to protect the other defendants. The prosecution, however, pointed to DiBona's conflicting testimony and evidence that Sullivan himself did not want to testify. Because the Court of Appeals had not evaluated these competing claims under the correct standard, the Supreme Court vacated the judgment and sent the case back (remanded it) for a new review consistent with its ruling.

=== Concurrence ===
Justice William Brennan concurred in part, disagreeing with the majority's explanation of Holloway. Brennan said defendant's "have the right to share a lawyer if they so choose" but the choice must be "knowing and intelligent". He said it was the trial judge's responsibility to ensure the trial has been conducted with "solicitude for the essential rights of the accused".

Justice Thurgood Marshall said the potential for conflict of interest in multiple representation cases was "so grave" the trial judge should always consider whether the defendant was properly warned of the risks and made an informed choice.
