= Allied Structural Steel Co. v. Spannaus =

- Supreme Court of the United States

Decided June 28, 1978
- Full case name: Allied Structural Steel Co. v. Spannaus
- Citations: 438 U.S. 234 (more)

Holding
- Minnesota's retroactive alteration of a private pension agreement violated the Contract Clause.

Court membership
- Chief Justice Warren E. Burger Associate Justices William J. Brennan Jr. · Potter Stewart; Byron White · Thurgood Marshall; Harry Blackmun · Lewis F. Powell Jr. William Rehnquist · John P. Stevens

Case opinions
- Majority: Stewart
- Dissent: Brennan, joined by White, Marshall
- Blackmun took no part in the consideration or decision of the case.

Laws applied
- Contract Clause

Allied Structural Steel Co. v. Spannaus, 438 U.S. 234 (1978), was a United States Supreme Court case in which the Court held Minnesota's retroactive alteration of a private pension agreement violated the Contract Clause.
