= Franks v. Delaware =

- Supreme Court of the United States

Argued February 27, 1978 Decided June 26, 1978
- Full case name: Jerome Franks v. Delaware
- Citations: 438 U.S. 154 (more) 98 S. Ct. 2674; 57 L. Ed. 2d 667

Case history
- Prior: Franks v. State, 373 A.2d 578 (Del. 1977)
- Subsequent: Franks v. State, 398 A.2d 783 (Del. 1979)

Holding
- Where a warrant affidavit contains a statement, necessary to the finding of probable cause, that is demonstrated to be both false and included by an affiant knowingly and intentionally, or with reckless disregard for the truth, the warrant is not valid.

Court membership
- Chief Justice Warren E. Burger Associate Justices William J. Brennan Jr. · Potter Stewart; Byron White · Thurgood Marshall; Harry Blackmun · Lewis F. Powell Jr. William Rehnquist · John P. Stevens

Case opinions
- Majority: Blackmun, joined by Brennan, Stewart, White, Marshall, Powell, Stevens
- Dissent: Rehnquist, joined by Burger

Laws applied
- U.S. Const. amends. IV, XIV

Franks v. Delaware, 438 U.S. 154 (1978), is a United States Supreme Court case dealing with defendants' rights to challenge evidence collected on the basis of a warrant granted on the basis of a false statement. The court held that when a warrant affidavit contains a statement necessary to the finding of probable cause but that is demonstrated to be both false and knowingly and intentionally included by an affiant, or with reckless disregard for the truth, the warrant is invalid.

== Facts ==
On March 5, 1976, Cynthia Bailey told police in Dover, Delaware that she had been confronted in her home earlier that morning by a man with a knife, and that he had sexually assaulted her. She described her assailant's age, race, height, build and facial hair, and provided a detailed description of his clothing as consisting of a white thermal undershirt, black pants with a silver or gold buckle, a brown leather three-quarter-length coat and a dark knit cap.

That same day, petitioner Jerome Franks was arrested for an unrelated assault involving a 15-year-old girl named Brenda that occurred six days earlier. After his formal arrest and while awaiting a bail hearing in family court, Franks allegedly stated to Robert McClements, the youth officer accompanying him, that he was surprised that the bail hearing was "about Brenda B. I know her. I thought you said Bailey. I don't know her."

Detectives Brooks and Gray submitted a sworn affidavit to a justice of the peace in Dover to support of a warrant to search petitioner's apartment. Paragraph 8 of the affidavit's probable-cause page mentioned Franks's statement to McClements. In Paragraph 10, it was noted that Bailey's description of the assailant described his clothing. The affidavit also described the police's attempt to confirm that Franks's typical outfit matched that of the assailant. Paragraph 15 recited: "On Tuesday, 3/9/76, your affiant contacted Mr. James Williams and Mr. Wesley Lucas of the Delaware Youth Center where Jerome Franks is employed and did have personal conversation with both these people."

Paragraphs 16 and 17 stated: "Mr. James Williams revealed to your affiant that the normal dress of Jerome Franks does consist of a white knit thermal undershirt and a brown leather jacket" and "Mr. Wesley Lucas revealed to your affiant that in addition to the thermal undershirt and jacket, Jerome Franks often wears a dark green knit hat."

A warrant was issued on the basis of the affidavit, and police searched Franks's apartment and found a white thermal undershirt, a knit hat, dark pants, a leather jacket and a single-blade knife, all of which were introduced as evidence at trial.

Prior to the trial, Franks's counsel filed a written motion to suppress the clothing and the knife found in the search. The motion alleged that the warrant did not establish probable cause and that the search and seizure were therefore conducted in violation of the Fourth and Fourteenth Amendments. At the hearing on the motion to suppress, defense counsel orally amended the challenge to include an attack on the veracity of the warrant affidavit. He also requested the right to call as witnesses Detective Brooks and Wesley Lucas and James D. Morrison of the youth center. Counsel asserted that Lucas and Morrison would testify that neither had been interviewed by the warrant affiants, and that, although they might have talked to another police officer, any information that they had provided to that officer was "somewhat different" from what was recited in the affidavit. Defense counsel charged that the misstatements were included in the affidavit not inadvertently but in "bad faith". Counsel also sought permission to call McClements and Franks as witnesses to establish that Franks's courthouse statement to police had been obtained in violation of his Miranda rights and that the search warrant was thereby tainted as the fruit of an illegally obtained confession. Id. at 17, 27.

In rebuttal, the state's attorney argued in detail, App. 124, (a) that Del. Code Ann., Tit. 11, §§ 2306, 2307 (1974), contemplated that any challenge to a search warrant was to be limited to questions of sufficiency based on the face of the affidavit; (b) that, purportedly, a majority of the states whose practice was not dictated by statute observed such a rule; and (c) that federal cases on the issue were to be distinguished because of Federal Rule of Criminal Procedure 41(e). He also noted that the Supreme Court of the United States had reserved the general issue of subfacial challenge to veracity in Rendorf v. United States when it ruled that, even if a veracity challenge were permitted, the alleged factual inaccuracies in that case's affidavit "were of only peripheral relevancy to the showing of probable cause, and, not being within the personal knowledge of the affiant, did not go to the integrity of the affidavit." The state objected to Franks "going behind [the warrant affidavit] in any way" and argued that the court must decide his motion "on the four corners" of the affidavit.

The trial court sustained the state's objection to Franks's proposed evidence. The motion to suppress was denied, and the clothing and knife were admitted as evidence at the ensuing trial. Tr.192–196. Franks was convicted. In a written motion for judgment of acquittal and/or new trial, Franks repeated his objection to the admission of the evidence, stating that he "should have been allowed to impeach the Affidavit used in the Search Warrant to show purposeful misrepresentation of information contained therein." The motion was denied, and Franks was sentenced to two consecutive terms of 25 years each and an additional consecutive life sentence.

On appeal, the Delaware Supreme Court affirmed, but its decision was reviewed and reversed by the Supreme Court of the United States. After the case was remanded, the Delaware Supreme Court reevaluated the legitimacy of the warrant and considered the ramifications of the false statements contained therein. It concluded: "Excised of the alleged false paragraphs[,] the warrant affidavit contains sufficient uncontested allegations to establish probable cause", and therefore affirmed Franks' conviction.

As of 2026, Franks is still serving his sentence at James T. Vaughn Correctional Center.

== Opinion ==
The Supreme Court of the United States held that "Where the defendant makes a substantial preliminary showing that a false statement knowingly and intentionally, or with reckless disregard for the truth, was included by the affiant in the warrant affidavit, and if the allegedly false statement is necessary to the finding of probable cause, the Fourth Amendment, as incorporated in the Fourteenth Amendment, requires that a hearing be held at the defendant's request. The trial court here therefore erred in refusing to examine the adequacy of petitioner's proffer of misrepresentation in the warrant affidavit."

== See also ==
- Exclusionary rule
- List of United States Supreme Court cases, volume 438
