= City of Rome v. United States =

- Supreme Court of the United States

Argued October 10, 1979 Decided April 22, 1980
- Full case name: City of Rome v. United States
- Citations: 446 U.S. 156 (more) 100 S. Ct. 1548, 64 L.Ed.2d 119
- Argument: Oral argument

Case history
- Prior: 450 F. Supp. 378 (D.D.C. 1978), 472 F. Supp. 221 (D.D.C. 1979)

Court membership
- Chief Justice Warren E. Burger Associate Justices William J. Brennan Jr. · Potter Stewart; Byron White · Thurgood Marshall; Harry Blackmun · Lewis F. Powell Jr. William Rehnquist · John P. Stevens

Case opinions
- Majority: Marshall, joined by Burger, Brennan, White, Blackmun, Stevens
- Concurrence: Blackmun
- Concurrence: Stevens
- Dissent: Powell
- Dissent: Rehnquist, joined by Stewart

City of Rome v. United States, 446 U.S. 156 (1980), was a United States Supreme Court case in which the majority upheld Section 5 of the Voting Rights Act of 1965 against a challenge to its constitutionality. Justice Thurgood Marshall authored the majority opinion, which held that Section 5 "does not exceed Congress' power to enforce the Fifteenth Amendment" and "does not violate principles of federalism". The Court's decision also rejected a request by Rome, Georgia to "bail out" of coverage under the Voting Rights Act, asserting that such a request would have to be made by the entire state of Georgia, rather than by an individual city.
