= Rhode Island v. Innis =

- Supreme Court of the United States

Argued October 30, 1979 Decided May 12, 1980
- Full case name: State of Rhode Island, Petitioner, v. Thomas J. Innis
- Citations: 446 U.S. 291 (more) 100 S. Ct. 1682; 64 L. Ed. 2d 297; 1980 U.S. LEXIS 94

Case history
- Prior: Certiorari to the Supreme Court of Rhode Island

Holding
- Interrogation under Miranda is defined as any words or actions on the part of the police that the police should know are reasonably likely to elicit an incriminating response.

Court membership
- Chief Justice Warren E. Burger Associate Justices William J. Brennan Jr. · Potter Stewart; Byron White · Thurgood Marshall; Harry Blackmun · Lewis F. Powell Jr. William Rehnquist · John P. Stevens

Case opinions
- Majority: Stewart, joined by White, Blackmun, Powell, Rehnquist
- Concurrence: White
- Concurrence: Burger
- Dissent: Marshall, joined by Brennan
- Dissent: Stevens

Laws applied
- U.S. Const. amend. V

Rhode Island v. Innis, 446 U.S. 291 (1980), is a decision by the United States Supreme Court that clarifies what constitutes "interrogation" for the purposes of Miranda warnings. Under Miranda v. Arizona, police are forbidden from interrogating a suspect once he has asserted his right to counsel under the Sixth Amendment. In Innis, the court held that interrogation is not just direct questioning but also its "functional equivalent"; namely, "any words or actions on the part of the police ... that the police should know are reasonably likely to elicit an incriminating response."

== Background ==
Innis was arrested in connection with an earlier robbery of a taxicab driver with a sawed-off shotgun. Upon arrest, Innis received his Miranda warnings, to which he responded that he understood his rights and wished to speak to an attorney. Innis was then placed in a police car to be driven to the central police station. The three officers placed with transporting Innis were instructed not to question or intimidate him in any way. On their way to the station, the officers began a discussion showing concern about the missing shotgun from the robbery. One of the officers stated that there were "a lot of handicapped children running around in this area" because a school for such children was located nearby, and "God forbid one of them might find a weapon with shells and they might hurt themselves." Innis then interrupted them and, showing concern for the children, asked the officers to turn back so he could show them the weapon. As the officers searched for the weapon, Innis was again read his Miranda rights, to which he acknowledged understanding but nonetheless was concerned for the children in the area. At trial, Innis moved to suppress the shotgun and his statements. The lower court denied the motion to suppress, while the Rhode Island Supreme Court held Innis was entitled to a new trial.

== Opinion of the Court ==
The court held that the Miranda safeguards come into play whenever a person in custody is subjected to either express questioning or its functional equivalent. So, "interrogation" under Miranda refers not only to express questioning, but also to any words or actions on the part of the police (other than those normally attendant to arrest and custody) that the police should know are reasonably likely to elicit an incriminating response from the suspect. Here, there was no express questioning of Innis. The conversation between the two officers was, at least in form, nothing more than a dialogue between them to which no response from respondent was invited. This does not raise to the level of "functional equivalent" of questioning, since it cannot be said that the officers should have known that their conversation was reasonably likely to elicit an incriminating response from Innis. Under this standard, any knowledge that the police might have concerning unusual susceptibility of the defendant to a particular form of persuasion might be an important factor in determining whether the police should have known that their words or actions were reasonably likely to elicit an incriminating response from the suspect.

There is nothing to suggest that the officers were aware that respondent was peculiarly susceptible to an appeal to his conscience concerning the safety of handicapped children. In this case, Innis' statement were viewed as voluntary and thus not barred by the Fifth Amendment.

The fact pattern in this case is similar to that in Brewer v. Williams, 430 U.S. 387 (1979), where police used their knowledge of Williams's deep religious beliefs to elicit an incriminating statement despite not formally questioning Williams. However, in Brewer, the state had already initiated formal judicial proceedings by obtaining an arrest warrant and arraigning Williams, thus triggering the protections of the Sixth Amendment right to counsel under the Massiah doctrine. By contrast, Innis was decided under the Fifth Amendment, since formal proceedings had not commenced.
