= Walker v. Armco Steel Corp. =

- Supreme Court of the United States

Argued January 8, 1980 Decided June 2, 1980
- Full case name: Walker v. Armco Steel Corp.
- Citations: 446 U.S. 740 (more) 100 S. Ct. 1978; 64 L. Ed. 2d 659; 1980 U.S. LEXIS 109; 29 Fed. R. Serv. 2d (Callaghan) 493

Court membership
- Chief Justice Warren E. Burger Associate Justices William J. Brennan Jr. · Potter Stewart; Byron White · Thurgood Marshall; Harry Blackmun · Lewis F. Powell Jr. William Rehnquist · John P. Stevens

Case opinion
- Majority: Marshall, joined by unanimous

Walker v. Armco Steel Corp., 446 U.S. 740 (1980), was a decision by the Supreme Court of the United States in which the Court further refined the test for determining whether federal courts sitting in diversity must apply state law as opposed to federal law. The question in Walker is whether in a diversity action the federal court should follow state law or, alternatively, Rule 3 of the Federal Rules of Civil Procedure in determining when an action is commenced for the purpose of tolling the state statute of limitations (SOL). The Court found no such conflict because a court’s refusal to apply the federal rule at issue would not in fact thwart some purpose the federal rule was intended to achieve. Favored treatment for federal procedural rules under the Rules Enabling Act is only appropriate when a rule is in fact applicable.

== Background information ==
The case dealt with a negligence claim brought by an Oklahoma plaintiff in the United States District Court for the Western District of Oklahoma against the defendant, a foreign corporation having its principal place of business in a state other than Oklahoma. Plaintiff was injured August 22, 1975. The complaint was filed on August 19, 1977, and the summons was issued that day. However, service of process was not made on the respondent until December 1, 1977. On January 5, 1978, the respondent filed a motion to dismiss the complaint on the grounds that it was barred by the applicable Oklahoma Statute of Limitations. Though the action was filed within the two-year SOL, the action is only deemed commenced when the service of the summons is made on the respondent, which in this case occurred after the SOL. Okla. Stat., Tit. 12 § 95 (1971) does not deem the action "commenced" for the purposes of the statute of limitations until service of the summons on the defendant. However, if the complaint is filed within the limitations period, the action is deemed to have commenced from the date of filing if the plaintiff serves the defendant within 60 days, even though that service may occur outside the limitations period.

The District Court dismissed the complaint as being barred by the statute of limitations under the state law of Oklahoma on the grounds that state law applied. The United States Court of Appeals for the Tenth Circuit affirmed.

== Court's decision ==
The Supreme Court affirmed the decision, holding that the action was barred by the Oklahoma statute of limitations because the scope of Rule 3 was not sufficiently broad to control the issue before the District Court. There was no indication that the Rule was intended to toll a state statute of limitations, much less that it purported to displace state tolling rules for purposes of state statutes of limitations. In diversity actions, Rule 3 governs the date from which various timing requirements of the Federal Rules begin to run, but does not affect state statutes of limitations.

In contrast to Rule 3, the Oklahoma statute is a statement of a substantive decision by that State that actual service on, and accordingly actual notice to, the defendant is an integral part of the policies. The establishment of a deadline gives the defendant legitimate peace of mind, and recognizes that after a certain period of time, it is unfair to require the defendant to piece together his defense to an old claim. Rule 3 does not replace such policy determinations found in state law, and that Rule and § 97 can exist side by side, each controlling its own intended sphere of coverage without conflict. The analysis regarding whether state or federal procedural law applies is not applicable because there is no direct conflict. In this case, both the applicable federal and state rules, Rule 3 and Okla. Stat., Tit. 12 § 97 (1971), "can exist side by side...each controlling its own intended sphere of coverage without conflict."
