= Stewart Organization, Inc. v. Ricoh Corp. =

- Supreme Court of the United States

Argued February 29, 1988 Decided June 20, 1988
- Full case name: Stewart Organization, Inc., et al. v. Ricoh Corp., et al.
- Citations: 487 U.S. 22 (more) 108 S. Ct. 2239; 101 L. Ed. 2d 22; 1988 U.S. LEXIS 2791

Case history
- Prior: 779 F.2d 643 (11th Cir. 1985); vacated on rehearing en banc, 810 F.2d 1066 (11th Cir. 1987); cert. granted, 484 U.S. 894 (1987).

Holding
- Federal law governed the District Court's decision whether to grant motion to transfer case to venue provided in contractual forum-selection clause.

Court membership
- Chief Justice William Rehnquist Associate Justices William J. Brennan Jr. · Byron White; Thurgood Marshall · Harry Blackmun; John P. Stevens · Sandra Day O'Connor; Antonin Scalia · Anthony Kennedy

Case opinions
- Majority: Marshall, joined by Rehnquist, Brennan, White, Blackmun, Stevens, O'Connor, Kennedy
- Concurrence: Kennedy, joined by O'Connor
- Dissent: Scalia

Laws applied
- 28 U.S.C. § 1404

Stewart Organization, Inc. v. Ricoh Corp., 487 U.S. 22 (1988), is a United States Supreme Court case in which the Court further refined the test for determining whether federal courts sitting in diversity must apply state law as opposed to federal law under the Erie doctrine. The question in Stewart was whether the federal venue transfer statute, 28 U.S.C. § 1404(a), occupied the field or whether Alabama law's unfavorable stance towards forum-selection clauses should instead be applied. The Court held that the federal statute governed the District Court's decision whether to give effect to the forum-selection clause.

== Background ==
Stewart Organization, Inc. brought a suit against Ricoh Corp. arising out of a dealership agreement which obligated Stewart to market Ricoh's copiers. The agreement included a forum-selection clause specifying that suits were to be brought in Manhattan. When Stewart filed suit in Alabama, Ricoh moved to transfer the case to Manhattan pursuant to the forum-selection clause. However, the Alabama District Court denied the motion because Alabama law "looks unfavorably upon contractual forum selection clauses." However, the court certified an interlocutory appeal, which the Eleventh Circuit accepted. The Eleventh Circuit narrowly reversed the District Court.

== Opinion of the Court ==
The Supreme Court remanded the case, holding that the federal venue transfer statute, 28 U.S.C. § 1404(a), governed the District Court's interpretation of forum-selection clauses. In particular, the considerations of convenience to the parties and the fairness of the transfer in light of the parties relative bargaining power (when drafting the forum-selection clause) mandated by federal law collided with the Alabama policy categorically disfavoring forum-selection clauses, and that in the "single field of operation... the instructions of Congress are supreme."

=== Scalia's dissent ===
Justice Scalia dissented from the majority opinion, arguing that there was no direct collision between § 1404(a) and Alabama's law, and that therefore the appropriate inquiry is whether the Rules of Decision Act, 28 U.S.C. § 1652, mandated the use of state law. Applying the RDA analysis from Hanna v. Plumer (1965), Scalia argued that state law governed the question because venue selection would encourage forum shopping, and that the choice of venue was highly outcome determinative because "[i]t is difficult to imagine an issue of more importance, other than one that goes to the very merits of the lawsuit, than the validity of a contractual forum-selection provision."
