= Nielsen v. Watanabe =

- Supreme Court of the United States

Argued November 9, 2026
- Full case name: Francis Nielsen, Petitioner v. Kekai Watanabe
- Docket no.: 25-417

Case history
- Prior: Defendant's motion to dismiss granted. Watanabe v. Derr, No. 22-cv-168 (D. Haw. 2023).; Reversed. 115 F.4th 1034 (9th Cir. 2024).; Reh'g en banc denied. 139 F.4th 1056 (9th Cir. 2025).; Cert. granted sub nom Nielsen v. Watanabe, 608 U.S. ___ (2026).

Questions presented
- Whether the Ninth Circuit here erred in recognizing a Bivens cause of action.

Court membership
- Chief Justice John Roberts Associate Justices Clarence Thomas · Samuel Alito; Sonia Sotomayor · Elena Kagan; Neil Gorsuch · Brett Kavanaugh; Amy Coney Barrett · Ketanji Brown Jackson

Nielsen v. Watanabe, No. 25-417, is a pending United States Supreme Court case relating to Bivens v. Six Unknown Named Agents.

== Background ==
=== Legal background ===
In 1971, the Supreme Court decided Bivens v. Six Unknown Named Agents of the Federal Bureau of Narcotics, 403 U.S. 388. On the morning of November 26, 1965, six agents of the Federal Bureau of Narcotics (FBN) (the predecessor agency to the Drug Enforcement Administration) entered the apartment of Webster Bivens in Brooklyn, New York. According to the complaint, agents entered the apartment without a search warrant, arrested Bivens for narcotics violations, handcuffed Bivens in front of his wife and children, threatened to arrest Bivens' family members, thoroughly searched the apartment, took Bivens to the federal courthouse in Brooklyn, then took Bivens to FBN headquarters, and later subjected Bivens to interrogation, booking, and a visual strip search. Bivens sued the individual FBN agents, principally alleging that they had violated his rights under the Fourth Amendment to the United States Constitution. At the time, no federal statute offered Bivens a cause of action for such a suit against federal officers (unlike 42 U.S.C. § 1983, which authorizes similar suits against state officers). The United States District Court for the Eastern District of New York and the United States Court of Appeals for the Second Circuit dismissed the suit on the ground that no cause of action existed. The Supreme Court reversed, holding that the Fourth Amendment itself implied a damages remedy against the officers.

Since Bivens, the Supreme Court has twice expanded its implied damages remedy outside of the original Fourth Amendment context. In Davis v. Passman, the Court found an implied damages remedy for a Fifth Amendment equal-protection component violation, where a Congressman fired an employee solely because she was a woman. In Carlson v. Green, the Court found an implied damages remedy for an Eighth Amendment violation, where federal prison officials were deliberately indifferent to a prisoner's serious medical needs, causing his death. However, since Carlson, the "Court has consistently declined to extend Bivens to new contexts," and requires federal courts to evaluate “proposed Bivens claim[s]” using a two-step analysis. First, courts must assess whether the claim “arises in a new Bivens context”—that is, whether it differs “in a meaningful way” from the cases where this Court previously recognized Bivens actions. Second, if the context is “new,” courts must ask whether “there are special factors counselling [sic] hesitation in the absence of affirmative action by Congress.” Those two steps “often resolve to a single question: whether there is any reason to think that Congress might be better equipped to create a damages remedy.”

=== Factual background ===
In July 2021, Respondent Kekai Watanabe was in detention at the Federal Detention Center, Honolulu. On July 12, a gang riot broke out in a unit that housed rival gang members. Watanabe was attacked with an improvised blunt weapon and sustained serious injuries. Watanabe and others involved were sent to solitary confinement cells. That evening, he requested to be seen by medical staff, describing a headache and other severe pain to two correctional officers. Days later, Watanabe was seen by Francis Nielsen, a staff nurse at FDC Honolulu. Nielsen downplayed Watanabe's pain, and declined to send him for treatment at a hospital.

Watanabe was kept in solitary confinement for more than two months following the July 12 riot. Despite continued requests for medical attention, Watanabe was not taken to a hospital. Months later, in February 2022, Watanabe was diagnosed with a fractured coccyx. An x-ray revealed that bone fragments had migrated and entered surrounding soft tissue. At that point, prison officials agreed to send Watanabe to be treated by a specialist.

=== Procedural background ===
Proceeding pro se, Watanabe filed a damages suit against Nielsen and others for violations of his Eighth Amendment rights in the United States District Court for the District of Hawaii. After his first complaint was dismissed, Watanabe filed an amended complaint. Upon Nielsen's motion, the district court dismissed the amended complaint, holding that no Bivens remedy exists for Watanabe's claim. On appeal, a divided panel of the United States Court of Appeals for the Ninth Circuit reversed. Judge Paez and Judge Koh held that the context surrounding Watanabe's Bivens claim was "functionally identical to the context in Carlson, where the Supreme Court recognized an implied cause of action under the Eighth Amendment." Judge Milan Smith dissented in part, He would have held that Watanabe’s claim “is meaningfully different than Carlson.” Over the dissent of eleven judges, the Ninth Circuit denied rehearing en banc.

== Supreme Court ==
On October 3, 2025, Nielsen petitioned the Supreme Court for a writ of certiorari. On June 22, 2026, the Court granted review. Oral arguments were heard on November 9. The case was argued on behalf of Nielsen by Lucas M. Walker; on behalf of the United States as amicus curiae in support of petitioners by Vivek Suri; and on behalf of Watanabe by Joshua M. Wesneski. A decision is expected by mid-2027.
