= List of killings by law enforcement officers in the United States, June 2010 =

This is a list of people reported killed by non-military law enforcement officers in the United States in June 2010, whether in the line of duty or not, and regardless of reason or method. The listing documents the occurrence of a death, making no implications regarding wrongdoing or justification on the part of the person killed or officer involved. Killings are arranged by date of the incident that caused death. Different death dates, if known, are noted in the description. The table below lists 34 people.

== June 2010 ==
Date	Name (Age) of Deceased	State (city)	Description
2010-06-30	Julian Collender (25)	California (Yorba Linda)	Shot to death in front yard of family residence by off-duty detective of Brea PD with a gun. Collender was shot to death at close range (6–8 ft away) after failing to "freeze" in a "timely manner." Collender was unarmed at the time of his murder.
2010-06-29	Andrew Carr (29)	Tennessee (Chattanooga)	
2010-06-28	Robert Weaver (27)	Texas (Dallas)	Dallas officers responded to a burglary of a motor vehicle call at an apartment complex at 13015 Audelia Road. As the officers were speaking with the 9-1-1 caller, Weaver drove through the complex in a vehicle. When Weaver stopped at the exit gate and waited for the gate to open, an officer approached his vehicle. The officer gave Weaver verbal commands to exit his vehicle, which he ignored. Weaver then reached for an object and pointed it at the officer. The officer discharged his weapon, fatally striking Weaver. Further investigation determined Weaver was unarmed.
2010-06-28	Arturo Enriquez, (36)	Colorado (Denver)	Shot after pointing a weapon at officers responding to a "man with a gun" 911 call
2010-06-27	Scott A. Brogli (45)	Ohio (Beavercreek)	An apparently intoxicated retired military man charged at police with an 8- to 10-inch-long kitchen knife Sunday before he was shot to death by a five-year veteran of the Beavercreek police force.
2010-06-25	Normane Bennett (23)	Missouri (St. Louis)	Bennett was shot after he fled from police who tried to arrest him for alleged drug activity. Police at the time said Bennett's family attacked officers, allowing him to flee, and that Bennett pulled a revolver, pointing it at the detective chasing him. The family disputed many of these claims, including that Bennett was armed, in a federal suit.
2010-06-25	Matthew Tutt (21)	Florida (Lakeland)	According to the Polk County Sheriff's Office, deputies confronted a suspicious white male riding a bicycle. After being stopped because his bike didn't have lights or reflectors on it, the suspect was initially cooperative. However, when the deputies asked for permission to search him, he pulled out a handgun and opened fire. "He just busted out with this firearm all of a sudden without any warning at all," Polk County Sheriff Grady Judd said. Both deputies were shot, but managed to return fire and the suspect fell to the ground.
2010-06-24	Zachary Champommier (18)	California (Studio City)	As a multi-jurisdictional task force organized by the U.S. Drug Enforcement Administration gathered in a parking lot for a debriefing, they noticed a man looking inside parked cars, including those belonging to task force members, said authorities. When one of the agents confronted the man, he began a struggle with the officer. A deputy went to the agent's aid, drawing his gun and ordering the suspect to the ground. A second man behind the wheel of a vehicle, later identified as Zachary Champommier, appeared suddenly, driving the vehicle at high speed toward the group. He rammed the deputy, who was thrown up onto the car before falling to the ground. A deputy and a task force member opened fire on Champommier.
2010-06-22	Jahad Phillips (19)	New Jersey (Newark)	Jahad Phillips, of Newark, was fatally shot by an officer as he was being pursued as a robbery suspect. Newark police said Phillips was shot after he charged toward a police cruiser with a gun drawn.
2010-06-20	Daniel Phillips (32)	California (Montebello)	A caller described a robbery suspect and that a citizen was following the suspect. Officers located the alleged assailant, later identified as Garcia, and chased him to a yard where it was believed he was hiding. Authorities said police gave specific commands to Garcia to lie down on the ground, but he allegedly attacked the officers while holding a knife. Commands were given again and he refused to follow them, according to the news release. Officers used their Tasers. Allegedly, Garcia did not stop and continued to go after the officers, holding the knife in front of him. Fearing for their safety, officers fired shots, striking Garcia. Investigators said they recovered a knife, as well as evidence linking Garcia to the robbery, at the scene.
2010-06-20	David Brown (27)	Texas (Lancaster)	Police were called to an apartment complex to investigate the fatal shooting of a man on the sidewalk. Brown was a suspect in the shooting, and became involved in a shootout with police in which both Brown and Officer Shaw were fatally wounded. Brown was the son of the Dallas police chief, suffered bipolar disorder, and was abusing drugs before the shootout. He told [his girlfriend] that his father Dallas Police Chief David Brown, Sr. was against him and believed his grandmother along with everybody else hated him. His girlfriend reported that he had been smoking 'WET' [marijuana or tobacco soaked in embalming fluid] the day before. ... He told her he was hearing voices in his head. His behavior was psychotic, paranoid. Brown had a brief stay at a psychiatric hospital in 2006, when he was diagnosed with bipolar disorder. According to a report, he had stopped taking his medication some time before the fatal shootout.
2010-06-20	Jamyrin Points (17)	Louisiana (New Orleans)	Three New Orleans police officers shot and killed a 17-year-old youth Sunday night in the St. Roch neighborhood after he allegedly pointed and leveled an assault rifle at the officers. The coroner's office determined that Jamyrin Points was shot 12 times, all in the back of his body. The New Orleans Police Department said that private surveillance footage from the scene shows the man raising the rifle at officer.
2010-06-19	Jesus Vasquez (48)	Florida (Southwest Ranches)	
2010-06-18	Caroline Small (35)	Georgia (Brunswick)	Police pursued Small in a slow-speed chase for reckless driving. After Small's vehicle pulled forward, police fired through the windshield eight times. Believing she was dead, officers turned away a former EMT who offered to render aid. She died a week later. A grand jury voted 12-4 that the officers were justified in killing Small, although one of the jurors who voted in favor of justification later said he regretted his vote.
2010-06-18	Kayre G. Snyder (45)	Pennsylvania (Middleburg)	
2010-06-18	Robert Wickson King (64)	North Carolina (Boone)	
2010-06-17	Veronica Harding-Perkins (46)	Maryland (Libertytown)	Harding-Perkins was killed by a trooper who fired several shots early Thursday morning after she pointed a gun at him from inside her doorway, police said.
2010-06-16	Dexter Luckett (23)	California (Bellflower)	Deputies responded to a call of shots fired, according to a sheriff's news release. When they arrived several informants confirmed they heard gunshots in the area. Authorities located Luckett, a 23 year old African American, who they said matched a description of the shooter. A deputy ordered Luckett to raise his hands, walk to the car and place his hands on the hood. At first, Luckett raised his hands then allegedly dropped his left hand toward his waistband. According to sheriff's officials, at that point the deputy again ordered Luckett to raise his hands and he complied, but as he reached the hood of the car, he quickly dropped his left hand to his rear waistband area, out of the deputy's view. Believing the suspect had retrieved a weapon and in fear for his life, authorities said the deputy fired from his duty weapon, hitting Luckett. Authorities said no weapon was recovered at the scene.
2010-06-15	Thomas Mayne (58)	Maine (Old Orchard Beach)	Shot after firing at federal agents who were attempting to arrest him.
2010-06-15	Michael White (47)	California (Vallejo)	
2010-06-13	Unnamed man (34)	California (Fremont)	
2010-06-12	Donnie Joe Lira (66)	Minnesota (Virginia)	Lira, wanted for opening fire on a house where his estranged wife and children were staying, was driving erratically when an officer attempted to pull him over. When Lira eventually did so, he pushed the driver's side door open and emerged carrying a rifle. "Drop the gun!" the officer yelled at Lira, over and over. "Drop the gun or I will kill you." Lira jacked a shell into the 7mm rifle's chamber, hoisted the gun to his shoulder and aimed at the officer. At that point the officer opened fire on Lira.
2010-06-11	Anthony Alvarez (26)	California (Sacramento)	
2010-06-11	Trevon Cole (21)	Nevada (Las Vegas)	Cole, an unarmed black man, was shot by a Las Vegas police officer who was serving a search warrant at his apartment. Officer Bryan Yant shot Cole once in the head with an AR-15 rifle. Cole's fiancée, who was in the apartment, said Cole had his hands up. Police said Cole made a "furtive movement" toward the officer. However, physical evidence indicated Cole was on his knees at the time he was shot. Also, the warrant was based on bad information and that Yant had confused the identities of two people with the same name, leading him to believe that Trevon Cole had a history of weapons charges. The Cole family received a 1.7 million dollar settlement.
2010-06-09	Anthony Aguilar (25)	California (Azusa)	An off-duty LA County sheriff's deputy was driving through a condominium complex when he witnessed a male and female near some parked cars acting suspiciously, according authorities. The deputy pulled up in his vehicle beside the two, identified himself as a deputy sheriff, and asked what they were doing in the area, authorities said. The male, later identified by the coroner's office as Anthony Aguilar, then allegedly reached for his waistband, investigators said. Fearing Aguilar was arming himself, the deputy fired one round from his duty weapon, striking him, according to sheriff's officials.
2010-06-08	Tim Weiss (53)	North Dakota (Belfield)	
2010-06-08	Michael W. Ballou (34)	Washington (Sedro-Woolley)	Shot after failing to follow commands to surrender.
2010-06-07	Kelly "Amber" DuPriest (39)	Nevada (Henderson)	DuPriest was strung out on methamphetamine June 7 when she drove a stolen car toward a group of Henderson police officers, ignoring repeated commands to stop.
2010-06-07	Hernández Güereca, Sergio Adrián (15)	Texas (El Paso) / Ciudad Juárez, Mexico	While standing in a cement culvert along the U.S.–Mexico border, Hernández Güereca was shot by Jesus Mesa Jr., a U.S. Customs and Border Protection agent who was on the U.S. side of the border and claimed Hernández Güereca had been throwing rocks at him, a claim that was contradicted by cell phone video. U.S. officials declined to prosecute or extradite Mesa for the killing. The boy's parents tried to sue for damages, and their case has reached the U.S. Supreme Court twice.
2010-06-06	Jeffrey Kilton Joyce (38)	Texas (Galveston)	Joyce's girlfriend called police to check on a man threatening suicide. When they arrived at Joyce's residence, he rushed toward an office brandishing a butcher knife. The officer shot Joyce to avoid being attacked.
2010-06-05	Stephen Hill (34)	California (Los Angeles)	Alleged porn-star killer Stephen Hill (AKA Steve Driver) died Saturday night following a day-long standoff with police that ended when officers used what they said was a stun-gun/Taser (according to others, and/or perhaps bean-bag projectile) against him and he stumbled back and took a fatal fall off a cliff in West Hills. Hill, who performed in adult films as Steve Driver and was a suspect in the killing of a fellow porn-star, was holding a Samurai-style sword at the edge of the cliff and threatening to kill himself.
2010-06-05	Dwayne M. Williams (30)	Maryland (Elkton)	Williams called 911 just before 1 a.m. to report a man with a gun outside a Pharmacy. When officers arrived, Williams got out of his pickup truck and raised and pointed his gun at the officers, prompting an exchange of gunfire. Delaware and Maryland police have said they later found a suicide note at his home.
2010-06-05	Audy Faulkner (18)	Missouri (Rolla)	A Rolla police officer shot 18-year-old Audy Faulkner on June 5 after the teen repeatedly pointed a gun at the officer following a traffic stop. Police said the incident started when an officer stopped a vehicle after seeing it run a stop sign.
2010-06-01	Alber Leday, Jr. (49)	California (Santa Rosa)	Deputies had been called to an apartment complex by a woman who said she was fearful of her ex-boyfriend who was on the premises, and that he had earlier assaulted her. Deputies spotted Leday in his car, who led them on a high speed chase, where he crashed into a light pole and got out of his car. Police and witnesses said he appeared to reach behind his back and pull up his waistband. The deputies fired upon Leday in reaction to this motion.

== See also ==
- Death in custody § United States
- Henry A. Wallace Police Crime Public Database
- List of cases of police brutality
- List of countries with annual rates and counts for killings by law enforcement officers
- List of law enforcement officers killed in the line of duty in the United States
- List of law enforcement officers convicted for an on-duty killing in the United States
- List of police reforms related to the George Floyd protests
- List of unarmed African Americans killed by law enforcement officers in the United States
- Lists of killings by law enforcement officers
- Police brutality in the United States
- Police misconduct § United States
- Police riot § United States
- Police use of deadly force in the United States
