= Houchins v. KQED, Inc. =

- Supreme Court of the United States

Argued November 29, 1977 Decided June 26, 1978
- Full case name: Houchins, Sheriff of the County of Alameda, California v. KQED, Inc., et al.
- Citations: 438 U.S. 1 (more) 98 S. Ct. 2588; 57 L. Ed. 2d 553; 1978 U.S. LEXIS 11

Holding
- The First Amendment does not provide a right of access to the media to interview certain prisoners that goes beyond the general public right of access to a county jail.

Court membership
- Chief Justice Warren E. Burger Associate Justices William J. Brennan Jr. · Potter Stewart; Byron White · Thurgood Marshall; Harry Blackmun · Lewis F. Powell Jr. William Rehnquist · John P. Stevens

Case opinions
- Plurality: Burger, joined by White, Rehnquist
- Concurrence: Stewart
- Dissent: Stevens, joined by Brennan, Powell
- Marshall and Blackmun took no part in the consideration or decision of the case.

Laws applied
- U.S. Const. amend. I

Houchins v. KQED, Inc., 438 U.S. 1 (1978), was a 1978 United States Supreme Court case in which the Court refused to recognize a "right of access", under the First Amendment, to interview particular prisoners.

== Procedural history ==
Sheriff Houchins of Alameda County in California controlled all access to the County Jail. KQED, a local radio and television operator, reported on a prisoner suicide in the jail and included a statement from a staff psychiatrist that living conditions there were responsible for the prisoner's illnesses.

KQED requested to inspect and photograph the jail, but the Sheriff refused. KQED and two local branches of the NAACP sued the Sheriff under 42 U. S. C. § 1983, claiming that the Sheriff's refusal violated the First Amendment. The District Court issued a preliminary injunction to prevent the Sheriff from outright denying KQED and other news media from visiting the jail and bringing audio and video recording devices.

Sheriff Houchins appealed the order to the Court of Appeals. After his appeal was denied, he appealed to the Supreme Court.

== Decision of the Court ==
The court voted 4-3 in favor of Sheriff Houchins, and reversed and remanded the case back the District Court. Chief Justice Burger wrote the Majority opinion, joined by Justice White and Rehnquist. Justice Stewart concurred with Judgment, while Justice Marshall and Blackmun abstained from the consideration or decision of the case.

=== Majority opinion ===
Justice Burger held "the media have no special right of access to the Alameda County Jail different from or greater than that accorded the public generally." He based the decision on previous precedent that the First Amendment did not compel either private or public entities to disclose information to the press. He also declined to expand the First Amendment's scope on policy grounds. "Whether the government should open penal institutions in the manner sought by respondents is a question of policy which a legislative body might appropriately resolve one way or the other." Information about jail conditions was still available through other channels, "albeit not as conveniently as [KQED] might prefer."

=== Concurring opinion by Stewart ===
Justice Stewart concurred with the Majority's decision to overturn the District Court's injunction, expressing concern over its overly broad scope, but expressing that a more limited injunction should replace it. He believed that the press should be given the ability to bring audio & video recording equipment, even if the general public was prohibited from doing so, since they are there to convey information to the general public.

== Dissent ==
Justice Stevens wrote the dissent, joined by Justices Brennan and Powell.

The dissent stated that Sheriff Houchins should have continued to be compelled to grant KQED and other news media access to the jail. They believed that the Sheriff had restricted KQED access because he was attempting to hide the conditions. They agreed with the District Court's opinion that "the broad restraints on access were not required by legitimate penological interests." The Sheriff changed his policy after the lawsuit, allowing for media tours but with limitations, such as a no camera policy.

The dissent stated that "there is no legitimate penological justification for concealing from citizens the conditions in which their fellow citizens are being confined" and "[a]n official prison policy of concealing such knowledge from the public by arbitrarily cutting off the flow of information at its source abridges the freedom of speech and of the press protected by the First and Fourteenth Amendments to the Constitution."

The majority's application of Pell v. Procunier to the case was criticized because it "was an isolated limitation on the efforts of the press to gather information about those conditions" imposed only after disciplinary problems had occurred.

== Notes ==
According to a 2009 report by Human Rights Watch, focussing on prison conditions in the United States, it was asserted that the absence of "the kind of public and media scrutiny that helps prevent abuses of power in other government institutions" is particularly notable within correctional facilities.
