= Shooting of José Rodríguez =

2012 incident near Nogales, Arizona

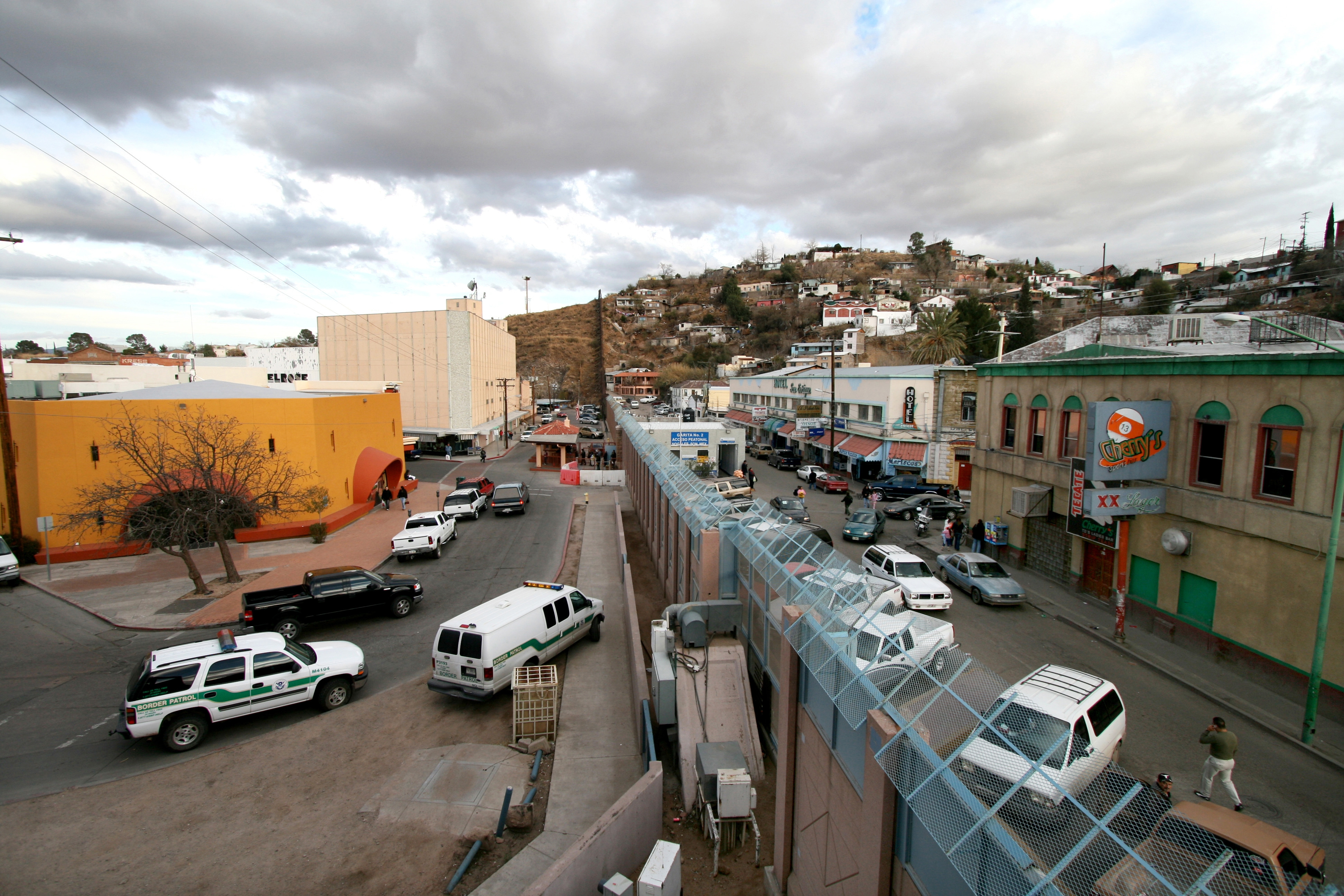
- View of the international border from the top of the U.S. Customs port of entry facility in Nogales, Arizona (January 2007)
- Date: October 10, 2012
- Location: Nogales, Arizona, United States Nogales, Sonora, Mexico
- Outcome: U.S. Border Patrol Agent Lonnie Swartz acquitted of murder
- Deaths: 1

On October 10, 2012, at the Mexico–United States border near Nogales, Arizona, U.S. Border Patrol agent Lonnie Swartz fired 16 shots at teenager José Antonio Elena Rodríguez (born January 4, 1996), killing him, on the grounds that young men threw rocks at him and other law enforcement agents.

Rodriguez was hit 10 times from behind by Swartz's shots. Swartz was charged with second degree murder for the killing. He was acquitted on the murder charge, but the jury failed to reach a verdict on two lesser charges; in his subsequent retrial on those charges, he was acquitted of involuntary manslaughter, while the jury again failed to return a verdict on the charge of voluntary manslaughter.

== Incident ==
Around 11:30 p.m. on Wednesday, October 10, 2012, John Zuñiga, a police officer in Nogales, Arizona, received a call reporting "suspicious activity" on International Street, a road running directly along the border. Getting to the scene, Zuñiga heard from another police officer from Nogales, Quinardo Garci, that two men carrying "bundles taped to their backs" had climbed the fence into the United States. Identifying the bundles, on the basis of similar incidents in the past, as most probably containing marijuana, they called out for back up.

After several Border Patrol and Customs agents arrived, they saw the two men scaling the fence back into Mexico, empty-handed and with nothing on their backs. They commanded the two men to climb back down. At that time, Garcia and Zuñiga stated in their reports that they saw "rocks flying through the air" at the assorted agents and also heard "gunfire," although they were unable to identify its source.

In the days following the incident, the U.S. Customs and Border Protection agency stated that:

After verbal commands from agents to cease [assaulting the agents with rocks] were ignored, one agent then discharged his service firearm. One of the subjects appeared to have been hit.

The person hit was José Antonio Elena Rodríguez, a 16-year old resident of Nogales, Mexico. He was unarmed, standing on the Mexican side of the border on a sidewalk on Calle Internacional street, in front of a doctor's office, below a sign reading "Medical Emergencies" in Spanish. He was hit from behind by 10 bullets. The autopsy revealed that gunshot wounds to the head, lungs, and arteries killed him.

== Trial ==
U.S. Border Patrol Agent Lonnie Ray Swartz was charged with second degree murder for the killing of José Rodríguez. There had been a number of similar incidents in the preceding decade, but this was the first time a US law enforcement officer was charged in relation to a killing that took part across the US–Mexican border.

In the trial, the defendant said he had used deadly force because Rodriguez "had been throwing rocks." A witness testified that Rodríguez was not throwing rocks at the law enforcement officers but prosecutors acknowledged that Rodríguez was throwing rocks across the border and went on to state that "he did not deserve to die" for this. The U.S. Customs and Border Protection refused to release surveillance-camera footage of the incident.

After the testimony of the director of the medical examiner in Miami-Dade County, Florida, Emma Lew, who stated that Swartz's first shot "likely hit the boy in the middle of his back as he was running," the prosecution rested its case in the trial on April 5, 2018.

On April 23, 2018, Swartz was acquitted on the charge of second-degree murder; the jury was deadlocked on lesser charges.

== Aftermath ==
The judge presiding on the trial, Raner Collins, declared a mistrial. The head of the Tucson union for Border Patrol officers, stated, after the jury's decision was announced, that "justice was properly served" and that the union was "pretty happy with it".

After the jury's decision was reported, protesters gathered outside the federal courthouse in downtown Tucson late Monday afternoon, on 23 April, and blocked off the intersection in front of it. Among those participating in the protest was the mother of Carlos LaMadrid, another Mexican teen who had been shot and killed by Border Patrol agents (in 2011).

== Retrials ==
Following the first trial, Assistant U.S. Attorney May Sue Feldmeier announced that prosecutors would seek a retrial on the two lesser charges (voluntary and involuntary manslaughter) against Swartz, who waived his right to appear in court. The case's presiding judge, U.S. District Judge Raner C. Collins, set the start of the new trial for 23 October, 2018, with a motion hearing scheduled in July 2018.

On November 21, 2018, Swartz was acquitted on the charge of involuntary manslaughter; the jury could not reach a verdict on the charge of voluntary manslaughter.

In 2019, the American Civil Liberties Union filed a suit in the Tucson federal district court on behalf of the family of José Antonio Elena Rodríguez against the Border Patrol agent who shot and killed him seeking civil damages. In a preliminary hearing on December 9, 2019, the prosecution showed a video reconstruction of the shooting, which included portions of video clips shot by two border cameras operated by the Border Patrol. (Note: According to The Arizona Republic report, one camera was mounted on a pole near the scene of the shooting, just west of the primary port of entry in Nogales, while the other was mounted about 2,500 feet away and east of the port of entry.) Defense attorneys asked the judge not to permit the video reconstruction to be shown at the trial, arguing that "the video evidence is unreliable."

== Review of similar incidents ==
A 2013 review by the Police Executive Research Forum (PERF) reviewed 67 shooting incidents that resulted in 19 people dying, during the period from January 2010 through October 2012. The review found agents guilty of criminal conduct in 3 of the incidents. Two agents faced disciplinary action in the form of an "oral reprimand".

== See also ==
- List of killings by law enforcement officers in the United States, October 2012
- Hernandez v. Mesa
