= List of killings by law enforcement officers in the United States, October 2012 =

This is a list of people reported killed by non-military law enforcement officers in the United States in October 2012, whether in the line of duty or not, and regardless of reason or method. The listing documents the occurrence of a death, making no implications regarding wrongdoing or justification on the part of the person killed or officer involved. Killings are arranged by date of the incident that caused death. Different death dates, if known, are noted in the description. The table below lists 50 people.

== October 2012 ==
| Date | Name (age) of deceased | State (City) | Description |
|---|---|---|---|
| 2012-10-31 | Hernandez, Philip (40) | California (San Diego) | Police began following a van that matched the description for several recent crimes. The driver allegedly stopped, got out of the van, and began shooting at officers with a rifle. The officers shot the man to death. |
| 2012-10-31 | Wilkerson, Marvin Donald (66) | Texas (Odessa) | Officers responded to a report of a man threatening people with a gun. An officer fatally shot Wilkerson when he pulled a handgun from his waistband. |
| 2012-10-30 | Lopez, Jonathan (28) | California (Bakersfield) | Police say officers spotted Lopez walking with a weapon and ordered him to stop. Lopez fled, and an officer shot and killed him during the pursuit. |
| 2012-10-29 | Morrison, Ronald James (52) | Nevada (Las Vegas) | Three officers shot and killed a man after he produced a handgun from his waistband. He was suspected of shooting a homeless man in the hand not long earlier. |
| 2012-10-29 | Lipscombe, William Charles | Texas (Buchanan Dam) | Officers responded to a report of shots fired at a home. The officers ordered Lipscombe to put down his weapon but he instead pointed it at them. The officers fatally shot him. |
| 2012-10-27 | unnamed female | Arizona (Phoenix) | Police were responding to a report of a man holding people hostage inside a home, and when they arrived they encountered a woman in the front yard holding a gun. After some sort of confrontation, officers fired multiple shots at the woman, killing her. Nine people were inside the home but police found no indication they were being held hostage. |
| 2012-10-26 | unnamed person #1 | California (Goshen) | A chase began after the driver of a Hyundai refused a traffic stop. The car crashed, and three people allegedly got out and began shooting at police. Officers returned fire, killing two people and injuring the other. |
| 2012-10-26 | unnamed person #2 | California (Goshen) | A chase began after the driver of a Hyundai refused a traffic stop. The car crashed, and three people allegedly got out and began shooting at police. Officers returned fire, killing two people and injuring the other. |
| 2012-10-26 | Burkinshaw, Troy Clark (52) | Utah (Corinne) | Shot after allegedly accelerating his car towards an officer on foot, following a pursuit. The officer had stopped when he saw the man urinating on the side of the road, and pursued him when he drove off while the officer was checking his name. |
| 2012-10-25 | Lamb, Lacey Denise | South Carolina (Woodruff) | Officer William T. Knight conducted a traffic stop and a man fled from the vehicle. As Officer Knight pursued the man, he shot and killed Lamb when she allegedly tried to assault him with the vehicle. Lamb was 21 weeks pregnant. |
| 2012-10-25 | Marco Antonio Castro (29) | Texas (La Joya) | An officer attempted to pull over a pickup truck suspected of smuggling narcotics. When the vehicle fled a law enforcement helicopter was called in. An officer in the helicopter shot on the truck, killing two people in the back of the truck. |
| 2012-10-25 | Jose Leonardo Coj Cumar (32) | Texas (La Joya) | An officer attempted to pull over a pickup truck suspected of smuggling narcotics. When the vehicle fled a law enforcement helicopter was called in. An officer in the helicopter shot on the truck, killing two people in the back of the truck. |
| 2012-10-25 | unnamed male | Texas (Keller) | Officer responded to a report of a shoplifter who had been detailed by store security. As the officer led the suspect to his squad car a struggle began. When the suspect threatened the officer and lunged for his gun, the officer shot the suspect multiple times. The suspect died at a local hospital. |
| 2012-10-24 | Ossenberg, Ronald Walter (52) | California (Lakeport) | Ossenberg was shot once by an officer after he allegedly wrestled her to the ground and attempted to take her firearm. Police say the officer had stopped to assist Ossenberg, who was in a car on the side of the highway, and that Ossenberg attacked her when she requested assistance after learning he had a felony warrant. Ruled justifiable by Lake County D.A. on May 30, 2013. |
| 2012-10-23 | unnamed male | Minnesota (St Paul) | Officers stopped a car as part of a drug investigation regarding a long-time drug dealer. The suspect began driving back and forth, ramming to police cruisers who had blocked his vehicle. Officers opened fire, killing the driver. Two passengers were unharmed. |
| 2012-10-21 | Castillo, Andrea (21) | Florida (Hialeah) | An officer in an unmarked police car ran into the back of the vehicle in which Castillo was a passenger. The force of the impact flipped Castillo's vehicle upside down and fatally injured Castillo. Officials claim the officer's speed was not a factor, but the attorney for Castillo's family states that 40 yards of skid marks at the scene suggest the officer was speeding. |
| 2012-10-21 | Moore, Jeremiah (29) | California (Vallejo) | Officers responded to a report of two naked men arguing, breaking car windows and attempting to set their own house on fire. Officers fatally shot Moore when he pointed a rifle at an officer. |
| 2012-10-20 | Swanson, Inga (42) | Florida (Spring Hill) | |
| 2012-10-18 | unnamed male (27) | California (Inglewood) | Suspect was in the emergency department of Centinela Hospital Medical Center, after developing a medical condition at the jail. The suspect had one hand cuffed to the bed and had a deputy guarding him. The suspect allegedly used his free hand to go after the deputies gun. The deputy fired one shot, fatally striking the suspect. |
| 2012-10-17 | Hammett, Danny (60) | Georgia (Hiram) | Officers attempted to serve a narcotics search warrant. Officers claim Hammet "brandished some type of weapon" and fatally shot him. Family members claim Hammett was unarmed and that police did not recover a gun or anything that could be considered a weapon. Narcotics were not found at the scene. |
| 2012-10-17 | unnamed male | California (Los Angeles) | Shot by officers after leading them on car chase. Female passenger was also shot, but survived. |
| 2012-10-16 | Dooley, Robert M. (59) | Iowa (Cantril) | Dooley was walking along a highway with a rifle. When officers approached and ordered him to drop the weapon, Dooley allegedly raised the rifle up and pointed at an officer. The officer fired one shot, fatally striking Dooley. |
| 2012-10-15 | Hernandez, Roberto Carlos (21) | Texas (Denton) | An officer stopped a vehicle for speeding. As the officer approached the vehicle, the driver accelerated toward the officer and rammed his squad car. The officer fired multiple times at the driver, who died at a local hospital. |
| 2012-10-15 | Kanosh, Corey (35) | Utah (Millard County) | A Millard County Sheriff's deputy shot and killed Kanosh after a high-speed pursuit Oct. 15. Deputies say Kanosh was the suspect of a stolen car report and attempted to evade officers when he was spotted. They say Kanosh fought with an officer when his car got stuck in rugged terrain near Fillmore and was shot. The family says they never got the full story from authorities. |
| 2012-10-15 | Muntz, Scott William (41) | North Carolina (Thomasville) | Officers arrived at Muntz's house after getting reports of shots being fired. Muntz fired at officers from inside the house. Muntz eventually exited the house armed with a pistol. He was shot by police aftering failing to follow orders to drop the weapon. Muntz died the following day of his injuries. |
| 2012-10-14 | Perez, Leondionas Dias (41) | Maryland (Baltimore) | An officer in a squad car with lights and sirens on was responding to a report of a shooting. The officer struck a pedestrian who died at a local hospital. |
| 2012-10-14 | Guerra, Jose Alberto (19) | Texas (San Antonio) | An officer responded to a report of a suspicious person walking in the middle of the road. Witnesses saw Guerra and the officer struggling on the side of the road. Guerra allegedly attempted to push the officer into traffic. The officer shot Guerra three times. Guerra died at a local hospital. |
| 2012-10-13 | Wilcox, Randall Kyle (30) | Tennessee (Marlow) | Wilcox refused to pull over for a traffic stop. Wilcox eventually stopped in a driveway, and ran into nearby woods. The pursuing officer caught up to him and the two men struggled. Wilcox allegedly pulled the officer's gun out of the holster. During the fight for the gun, it was discharged. Both Wilcox and the officer were injured in the struggle. Wilcox died of his wounds. |
| 2012-10-13 | Collins, Erica (26) | Ohio (Cincinnati) | An officer was responding to domestic dispute between Collins and her sister. The officer observed Collins attempt to slash her sister's tires with a kitchen knife. The officer ordered her to drop the knife. Collins then allegedly advanced on the officer and raised the knife. The officer fired two shots, killing Collins. |
| 2012-10-13 | Zepeda, Jose (24) | California (Oxnard) | After a car chase in which the suspects allegedly brandished firearms at the officers. Two of the three suspects got out of the car and ran on foot. When the pursuing officers came under fire, they returned fire. Both suspects were shot, one fatally. An innocent bystander was also killed in the gunfire. It is not currently known if it was a suspect's or officer's bullet that killed him. |
| 2012-10-11 | Bell, Logan (18) | Illinois (Rockford) | Bell was spotted by police carrying what appeared to be a firearm. Bell ran from police. When the officers caught up to him and told him to drop the weapon, Bell allegedly raised the gun up. Bell was shot multiple times, and died from his wounds. The weapon he was carrying was a pellet gun. |
| 2012-10-10 | Rodríguez, José Antonio Elena (16) | Mexico (Nogales) | U.S. Border Patrol agents witnessed suspected drug smugglers abandon a load of narcotics and flee back into Mexico. As the agents approached the border, people on the Mexican side of the border began throwing rocks at them. The agents ordered the rock throwers to stop. When they did not, agent Lonnie Swartz opened fire on the crowd, killing Elena-Rodriguez. He was shot multiple times in the back. While Elena-Rodriguez was shot in Mexico, Swartz fired his weapon from the U.S. through the fence. Elena-Rodriguez's family were U.S. citizens. In September 2015, Swartz was indicted on the charge of second-degree murder. |
| 2012-10-10 | unnamed male (41) | California (Santa Clara) | Officers responded to a report of a domestic disturbance. After being assured by a 41-year-old man and his 66-year-old father that the matter was settled, the officers left. Moments later they heard arguing and returned to find the son advancing on his father with a knife. The son refused commands to drop the knife and was fatally shot by all three officers. |
| 2012-10-08 | Woodfork, Tracy Jr. (22) | Maryland (Silver Spring) | Police responded to report of possibly suicidal man. Police found a man with gun in hand. A confrontation ensued and the man was shot by police. He died at a local hospital. Investigators determined that firearm in his possession was a replica. |
| 2012-10-06 | Collar, Gilbert Thomas (18) | Alabama (Mobile) | Collar was naked and banging on the window of the police station. Collar was acting erratically and repeatedly approached an officer who had gone outside to investigate. The officer shot Collar once in the chest. |
| 2012-10-06 | unnamed male (66) | California (Los Angeles) | Police were responding to a report of a man armed with a knife and making threats when they shot and killed the suspect. |
| 2012-10-06 | unnamed male (15) | Arizona (Tombstone) | Officers responded to report of home burglary. Officers found an armed teenager inside and fatally shot him. |
| 2012-10-05 | Glaze, Kenneth (50) | North Carolina (Gastonia) | Officers were responding to a call about a domestic dispute between Glaze and his sister. When the officers arrived they confronted Glaze in the backyard. During a struggle for one of the officer's weapon, Glaze was fatally shot. |
| 2012-10-05 | Hirsch, Walter (54) | Arkansas (Russellville) | Officers were responding to a call about a suicidal person. An officer-involved shooting occurred, and the person was killed. |
| 2012-10-05 | O'Connor, Jeffrey (25) | Minnesota (Richfield) | Officers were responding to a disturbance and possible hostage situation. When police arrived, they encountered a man with a knife and shot him. |
| 2012-10-05 | unnamed male | California (Hayward) | Officers approached a vehicle when they ran the plates and discovered the car was stolen. They shot the man after he allegedly reached for a weapon. Police have declined to say what the weapon was. |
| 2012-10-05 | Montgomery, Robert (29) | Pennsylvania (Wilkes-Barre) | Officers attempted to arrest Montgomery on charges of homicide. Montgomery shot and wounded one officer. Police returned fire, killing Montgomery. |
| 2012-10-05 | Peterson, Christian A.N. | Wisconsin (Eau Claire) | Officers were pursuing Peterson in a high-speed chase after allegedly he entered a home and robbed the resident of their car keys at gun point. The pursuit continued on foot, and an officer confronted Peterson as he moved toward an occupied vehicle. The officer shot and killed Peterson when he reportedly refused to drop his weapon. |
| 2012-10-04 | Arraiol, David (34) | Massachusetts (Taunton) | Officers approached Arraiol on foot regarding outstanding warrants. When Arraiol drew a handgun officers fatally shot him. |
| 2012-10-04 | Maupin, Travis (32) | Kansas (Osawatomie) | Officers responded to report of a domestic disturbance. Officers pursued Maupin on foot. Maupin resisted arrest. Shortly after the officers used a Taser gun on Maupin, he "coded". He was taken to the local hospital where he died. |
| 2012-10-04 | Polanco, Noel (22) | New York (New York) | Polanco was reportedly driving erratically and cut off two unmarked police vans. After using their vans to force the car to stop, a uniformed detective and a second officer approached the vehicle. The detective, who was on the passenger side, allegedly saw Polanco reach for something under his seat and fired one shot. Polanco, who was unarmed, was fatally struck in the abdomen. |
| 2012-10-04 | Camberdella, Michael (18) | Florida (Boynton Beach) | |
| 2012-10-02 | Ivie, Nicholas | Arizona (Naco) | Ivie was on duty as a Border Patrol agent and responded to a report of a tripped ground sensor. Gunfire erupted, killing Ivie and injuring another agent. An FBI investigation determined that there "are strong preliminary indications" that Ivie was unintentionally killed by gunfire from a third agent. |
| 2012-10-02 | Alexis, David (26) | Florida (Miami) | Suspect approached two detectives who were conducting surveillance with his arm behind his back. The two officers identified themselves as police. A fight ensued between the detectives and the suspect and the suspect was fatally shot. A firearm was found in his possession. |
| 2012-10-02 | unnamed male | Alaska (Bethel) | Officers responded to a report of a domestic disturbance and fatally shot a man. |

== See also ==
- Death in custody § United States
- Henry A. Wallace Police Crime Public Database
- List of cases of police brutality
- List of countries with annual rates and counts for killings by law enforcement officers
- List of law enforcement officers killed in the line of duty in the United States
- List of law enforcement officers convicted for an on-duty killing in the United States
- List of police reforms related to the George Floyd protests
- List of unarmed African Americans killed by law enforcement officers in the United States
- Lists of killings by law enforcement officers
- Police brutality in the United States
- Police misconduct § United States
- Police riot § United States
- Police use of deadly force in the United States
