= Rules Enabling Act =

1934 United States law allowing judicial rules

- Long title: An act to give the Supreme Court of the United States authority to make and publish rules in actions at law.
- Enacted by: the 73rd United States Congress

The Rules Enabling Act (ch. 651, Pub. L. 73–415, 48 Stat. 1064, enacted June 19, 1934, 28 U.S.C. § 2072) is an Act of Congress that gave the judicial branch the power to promulgate the Federal Rules of Civil Procedure. Amendments to the Act allowed for the creation of the Federal Rules of Criminal Procedure and other procedural court rules. The creation and revision of rules pursuant to the Rules Enabling Act are usually carried out by the Committee on Rules of Practice and Procedure (known as the "Standing Committee") and its advisory committees, which are part of the Judicial Conference of the United States, the policymaking body of the United States federal courts.

The enactment of the Rules Enabling Act on June 19, 1934, was a revolutionary moment in the history of civil procedure in the United States. The law repealed the archaic "conformity principle" which had governed actions at law (and only actions at law) in U.S. federal courts for over 140 years; namely, the rule that federal courts should conform their procedure in such actions to that of the courts in the state in which they were located. The conformity principle had caused major problems for federal courts that did not actually sit in the United States, such as the United States Court for China.

While the courts exercised rulemaking powers granted to them under the Act without Congressional intervention for nearly forty years, Congress refused to allow the Federal Rules of Evidence to go into effect after their approval by the Supreme Court in 1973. The Rules of Evidence were eventually passed, with substantial changes, as legislation by Congress. Because of Congress's intervention in 1973 and subsequent years, the Act's rulemaking powers granted to the judiciary have been reduced, causing the Act to command less importance in recent years. However, the Act makes it very difficult for litigants to challenge the constitutional validity of the Federal Rules under the Erie Doctrine. Hanna v. Plumer, 380 U.S. 460, 473 (1965).

== See also ==
- Federal Rules of Appellate Procedure
- Federal Rules of Bankruptcy Procedure
- Federal Rules of Civil Procedure
- Federal Rules of Criminal Procedure
- Federal Rules of Evidence
