= Butz v. Economou =

- Supreme Court of the United States

Argued November 7, 1977 Decided June 29, 1978
- Full case name: Earl L. Butz et al., Petitioners, v. Arthur N. Economou et al.
- Citations: 438 U.S. 478 (more) 98 S. Ct. 2894, 57 L. Ed. 2d 895
- Argument: Oral argument

Case history
- Prior: Economou v. US Dept. of Agriculture, 535 F.2d 688 (2d Cir. 1976).

Holding
- Neither Barr v. Matteo, 360 U. S. 564, nor Spalding v. Vilas, 161 U. S. 483, supports petitioners' contention that all of the federal officials sued in this case are absolutely immune from any liability for damages even if, in the course of enforcing the relevant statutes, they infringed respondent's constitutional rights, and even if the violation was knowing and deliberate.

Court membership
- Chief Justice Warren E. Burger Associate Justices William J. Brennan Jr. · Potter Stewart; Byron White · Thurgood Marshall; Harry Blackmun · Lewis F. Powell Jr. William Rehnquist · John P. Stevens

Case opinions
- Majority: White, joined by Brennan, Marshall, Blackmun, Powell
- Concur/dissent: Rehnquist, joined by Burger, Stewart, Stevens

Butz v. Economou, 438 U.S. 478 (1978), was a United States Supreme Court case decided in 1978 regarding the degree of legal immunity afforded to federal government officials when they are sued on constitutional grounds. The court held that such officials were entitled only to qualified immunity, except for those duties for which absolute immunity could be shown to be essential. The majority also acknowledged that "there are some officials whose special functions require a full exemption from liability", including administrative law judges and other agency officials.
