= List of United States Supreme Court cases, volume 438 =

This is a list of all the United States Supreme Court cases from volume 438 of the United States Reports:

Case name	Citation	Date decided
Houchins v. KQED, Inc.	438 U.S. 1	1978
United States v. Grayson	438 U.S. 41	1978
Duke Power Co. v. Carolina Environmental Study Group	438 U.S. 59	1978
Penn Central Transportation Co. v. City of New York	438 U.S. 104	1978
Franks v. Delaware	438 U.S. 154	1978
McAdams v. McSurely	438 U.S. 189	1978
Berry v. Doles	438 U.S. 190	1978
Swisher v. Brady	438 U.S. 204	1978
Allied Structural Steel Co. v. Spannaus	438 U.S. 234	1978
Regents of the University of California v. Bakke	438 U.S. 265	1978
United States v. United States Gypsum Co. (1978)	438 U.S. 422	1978
Butz v. Economou	438 U.S. 478	1978
St. Paul Fire & Marine Insurance Co. v. Barry	438 U.S. 531	1978
Furnco Construction Corp. v. Waters	438 U.S. 567	1978
Lockett v. Ohio	438 U.S. 586	1978
Bell v. Ohio	438 U.S. 637	1978
California v. United States	438 U.S. 645	1978
United States v. New Mexico	438 U.S. 696	1978
FCC v. Pacifica Foundation	438 U.S. 726	1978
Alabama v. Pugh	438 U.S. 781	1978
