= List of United States Supreme Court cases, volume 446 =

This is a list of all the United States Supreme Court cases from volume 446 of the United States Reports:

Case name	Citation	Date decided
Curtiss-Wright Corp. v. General Elec. Co.	446 U.S. 1	1980
Carlson v. Green	446 U.S. 14	1980
Mobile v. Bolden	446 U.S. 55	1980
Wengler v. Druggists Mut. Ins. Co.	446 U.S. 142	1980
City of Rome v. United States	446 U.S. 156	1980
Baldasar v. Illinois	446 U.S. 222	1980
Williams v. Brown	446 U.S. 236	1980
Marshall v. Jerrico, Inc.	446 U.S. 238	1980
United States v. Louisiana (1980)	446 U.S. 253	1980
American Export Lines, Inc. v. Alvez	446 U.S. 274	1980
Rhode Island v. Innis	446 U.S. 291	1980
General Telephone Co. of Northwest v. EEOC	446 U.S. 318	1980
Cuyler v. Sullivan	446 U.S. 335	1980
Nachman Corp. v. Pension Benefit Guaranty Corporation	446 U.S. 359	1980
Busic v. United States	446 U.S. 398	1980
Godfrey v. Georgia	446 U.S. 420	1980
Navarro Savings Assn. v. Lee	446 U.S. 458	1980
Board of Regents of Univ. of State of N. Y. v. Tomanio	446 U.S. 478	1980
Andrus v. Utah	446 U.S. 500	1980
Texas v. New Mexico	446 U.S. 540	1980
United States v. Mendenhall	446 U.S. 544	1980
Harrison v. PPG Industries, Inc.	446 U.S. 578	1980
Andrus v. Glover Constr. Co.	446 U.S. 608	1980
United States v. Havens	446 U.S. 620	1980
Gomez v. Toledo	446 U.S. 635	1980
Catalano, Inc. v. Target Sales, Inc.	446 U.S. 643	1980
Harris v. Rosario	446 U.S. 651	1980
Andrus v. Shell Oil Co.	446 U.S. 657	1980
Aaron v. SEC	446 U.S. 680	1980
Supreme Court of Va. v. Consumers Union of United States, Inc.	446 U.S. 719	1980
Walker v. Armco Steel Corp.	446 U.S. 740	1980
Hanrahan v. Hampton	446 U.S. 754	1980
Hanrahan v. Hampton	446 U.S. 1301	1980
Sumner v. Mata	446 U.S. 1302	1980
Pacileo v. Walker	446 U.S. 1307	1980
Blum v. Caldwell	446 U.S. 1311	1980
Barnstone v. University of Houston	446 U.S. 1318	1980
Marten v. Thies	446 U.S. 1320	1980
