= Carlson v. Green =

- Supreme Court of the United States

Argued January 7, 1980 Decided April 22, 1980
- Full case name: Norman A. Carlson, Director, Federal Bureau of Prisons, et al., Petitioners v. Marie Green, Administratrix of the Estate of Joseph Jones, Jr.
- Docket no.: 78-1261
- Citations: 446 U.S. 14 (more)

Case history
- Prior: Defendants' motion to dismiss granted. Green v. Carlson, No. TH 76-93-C (S.D. Ind. 1977).; Reversed. 581 F.2d 669 (7th Cir. 1978).; Reh'g en banc denied. No. 77-1334 (7th Cir. 1978).; Cert. granted. 442 U.S. 940 (1979).

Holding
- The fact that a plaintiff may bring a suit against the United States under the Federal Tort Claims Act does not prevent them from seeking a Bivens remedy.

Court membership
- Chief Justice Warren E. Burger Associate Justices William J. Brennan Jr. · Potter Stewart; Byron White · Thurgood Marshall; Harry Blackmun · Lewis F. Powell Jr. William Rehnquist · John P. Stevens

Case opinions
- Majority: Brennan, joined by White, Marshall, Blackmun, Stevens
- Concurrence: Powell (in judgment), joined by Stewart
- Dissent: Burger
- Dissent: Rehnquist

Carlson v. Green, 446 U.S. 14 (1980), was a United States Supreme Court case in which the court held that the fact that a plaintiff may bring a suit against the United States under the Federal Tort Claims Act (FTCA) does not prevent them from seeking a remedy under Bivens v. Six Unknown Named Agents.

== Background ==
=== Legal background ===
In 1971, the Supreme Court decided Bivens v. Six Unknown Named Agents of the Federal Bureau of Narcotics. In Bivens, the Supreme Court held that an implied cause of action existed for an individual who had been subject to unreasonable searches and seizures by agents of the Federal Bureau of Narcotics, in violation of his Fourth Amendment rights. After Bivens, the Supreme Court next expanded its implied damages remedy outside of the original Fourth Amendment context in 1979. In Davis v. Passman, the Court found an implied damages remedy for a Fifth Amendment equal-protection component violation, where a Congressman fired an employee solely because she was a woman.

=== Factual background ===
In 1972, Joseph Jones (formerly known as Roscoe Simmons) was convicted of bank robbery and sentenced to serve a term of imprisonment of ten years. At the time of his death, Jones was serving his sentence at the United States Penitentiary, Terre Haute in Terre Haute, Indiana. Upon his entry into the federal prison system in 1972, Jones was diagnosed with chronic asthma. Following a July 1975 hospitalization related to his condition, Jones was returned to USP Terre Haute with a prescription for medication and steroid treatments. Prison officials neglected to administer such treatments.

On August 15, 1975, Jones suffered an asthmatic attack and was admitted to the prison hospital. For eight hours, Jones received no medical attention—no doctor was on duty at the time and no doctor was called in. As time progressed, Jones's condition worsened. After attending to matters elsewhere in the prison, medical training assistant William Walters returned to Jones with a respirator, and attempted to use it. Walters had previously been made aware that the respirator was broken. Jones pulled away from the respirator, telling Walters that it was making his breathing worse. Walters then administered two injections of chlorpromazine (marketed under the brand name Thorazine) to Jones. Thorazine is an antipsychotic medication used to treat psychotic disorders such as schizophrenia. However, it is contraindicated for one suffering an asthmatic attack, as Jones was.

Soon after the second injection, Jones suffered respiratory arrest. Walters, along with a colleague, attempted to resuscitate Jones with a defibrillator, but neither knew how to operate the machine. Jones was transported to a nearby hospital, where he was pronounced dead.

== Lower court history ==
On June 18, 1976, Marie Green (acting as the administratrix of Jones's estate) filed suit in the United States District Court for the Southern District of Indiana. In her complaint, Green alleged that prison officials had engaged in gross and intentional medical maltreatment in violation of the Fifth and Eight Amendments. On January 10, 1977, the court dismissed Green's lawsuit. While the court agreed that Green could avail herself of a Bivens-type remedy, it held that Indiana law limited Green's potential recoverable damages to the extent that she likely could not satisfy the requirements for invoking the jurisdiction of the federal courts.

On appeal, the United States Court of Appeals for the Seventh Circuit reversed in relevant part. It agreed with the district court that Green could allege a Bivens claim for the Fifth and Eighth Amendment violations she alleged. However, the Seventh Circuit declined to apply the Indiana code provisions to the case.

== Supreme Court ==
On February 13, 1979, Norman Carlson (the director of the Federal Bureau of Prisons) petitioned the Supreme Court for a writ of certiorari. On June 18, 1979, the Court granted review. Oral arguments were heard on January 7, 1980. Kenneth Geller argued the case for petitioners. Michael Deutsch argued the case for respondents. On April 22, 1980, the Court issued its opinions.

Justice Brennan authored the majority opinion, in which Justices White, Marshall, Blackmun, and Stevens joined. The majority opinion held that Green could avail herself of a Bivens remedy, despite also being able to sue under the Federal Tort Claims Act (FTCA). In so holding, the court declared that no special factors existed that would counsel limiting Green to suits under the FTCA.

Justice Powell authored an opinion concurring in the judgment, in which Justice Stewart joined. Justice Powell distanced himself from the majority opinion's description of Bivens remedies as a matter of right when defendants fail to identify an equally effective alternative remedy. He concluded:

In my view, the Court's willingness to infer federal causes of action that cannot be found in the Constitution or in a statute denigrates the doctrine of separation of powers and hardly comports with a rational system of justice.

— Carlson, 446 U.S., at 29 (Powell, J., concurring in the judgment).

Chief Justice Burger authored a dissenting opinion. He would have held that the FTCA supplied Green an adequate alternative remedy to a Bivens claim, and would limit Bivens to "those circumstances in which a civil rights plaintiff had no other effective remedy.

Justice Rehnquist authored a dissenting opinion. Justice Rehnquist believed that Bivens was wrongly decided, and that the Constitution nowhere authorizes courts to create a private damages action because a constitutional right has been violated. He pointed out that Congress had amended the FTCA in 1974 to permit suits against the United States for many intentional torts committed by federal law-enforcement officers. Justice Rehnquist argued that even if the FTCA is imperfect, Congress considered the problem and enacted the remedy it preferred, and that Courts should not supplement that remedy simply because they think another remedy would work better.
