= Hernandez v. Mesa =

- Supreme Court of the United States

Argued November 12, 2019 Decided February 25, 2020
- Full case name: Jesus C. Hernandez, et al. v. Jesus Mesa Jr., et al.
- Docket no.: 17-1678
- Citations: 589 U.S. 93 (more) 140 S. Ct. 735; 206 L. Ed. 2d 29
- Argument: Oral argument

Case history
- Prior: Motion to dismiss granted, Hernandez v. United States, 802 F. Supp. 2d 834 (W.D. Tex. 2011); Affirmed in part, reversed in part, 757 F.3d 249 (5th Cir. 2014); Rehearing en banc granted, 771 F.3d 818 (5th Cir. 2014); Dismissal affirmed on rehearing en banc, 785 F.3d 117 (5th Cir. 2015); Cert. granted, sub. nom., Hernandez v. Mesa, 137 S. Ct. 291 (2016); Vacated and remanded, Hernandez v. Mesa, 582 U.S. 548 (2017), 137 S. Ct. 2003 (2017); Dismissal affirmed on remand, 885 F.3d 811 (5th Cir. 2018); Cert. granted, 139 S. Ct. 2636 (2019);

Holding
- Bivens's holding does not extend to claims based on a cross-border shooting.

Court membership
- Chief Justice John Roberts Associate Justices Clarence Thomas · Ruth Bader Ginsburg; Stephen Breyer · Samuel Alito; Sonia Sotomayor · Elena Kagan; Neil Gorsuch · Brett Kavanaugh

Case opinions
- Majority: Alito, joined by Roberts, Thomas, Gorsuch, Kavanaugh
- Concurrence: Thomas, joined by Gorsuch
- Dissent: Ginsburg, joined by Breyer, Sotomayor, Kagan

Laws applied
- U.S. Const. amend. IV, V

Hernandez v. Mesa was a pair of United States Supreme Court cases (582 U.S. 548 (2017) and 589 U.S. 93 (2020)) in which the court held that the precedent established under the 1971 Bivens v. Six Unknown Named Agents decision did not extend to claims based on cross-border shootings.

The case centered on the 2010 shooting of a Mexican teenager on the Mexican side of the Mexico–United States border by a U.S. Border Patrol agent who was standing on the U.S. side of the border at the time he fired his weapon. The case, heard through the Fifth Circuit, had reached the Supreme Court twice, first in 2017 and again in 2019. Both times, the Fifth Circuit ruled that the agent could not be sued for his actions. At the time of the 2017 hearing, the Supreme Court had just ruled in Ziglar v. Abbasi, another case involving Bivens which introduced special considerations for these types of cases; and the Supreme Court reversed the Fifth Circuit's decision in Hernandez and remanded the case to be reheard on the basis of Ziglar. On its appeal in 2019, the Court decided the situation was an international one that required a diplomatic solution to be set by Congress rather than a civil one determined by the courts, and upheld the Fifth Circuit's ruling.

== Background ==
=== Case history ===
On June 7, 2010, Jesus Mesa Jr., a United States Border Patrol agent, shot and killed Sergio Adrián Hernández Güereca in the cement culvert separating Ciudad Juárez, Chihuahua, Mexico, and El Paso, Texas, United States. At the time of the shooting, Hernández Güereca, a 15-year-old Mexican boy, was standing on the Mexican side of the Mexico–United States border, while the agent was on the American side. Hernández Güereca and several other boys had been playing around in the culvert – running up to touch the fence on the U.S. side of the border and then running back into Mexico. The agent claimed after the shooting that he had used deadly force because the boys had been throwing rocks at him. Cell phone video contradicted that claim.

The shooting led to a protracted court case which has examined whether the due process clause of the 5th Amendment to the U.S. Constitution protected Hernández Güereca's life even though he was not standing on U.S. soil, and whether Mesa could claim qualified immunity for his actions as a U.S. law enforcement officer.

== Initial consideration in lower courts ==
The Mexican government indicted Mesa for murder for the killing, but the U.S. refused to extradite him to Mexico. The U.S. Department of Justice investigated the incident, but declined to prosecute Mesa.

Hernández Güereca's parents alleged that Mesa's actions violated his civil rights under the Fourth and Fifth amendments, and filed a claim citing the Bivens precedent, a 1971 Supreme Court case that established an implied cause of action for violations of civil rights by federal agents. The U.S. District Court for the Western District of Texas initially dismissed the case. However, a panel of judges for the Fifth Circuit Court of Appeals concluded that Hernández Güereca had 5th Amendment rights, and that these rights had been violated when Mesa killed him. The panel further said that Mesa could not claim qualified immunity for his actions, as "no reasonable officer would have understood Agent Mesa's alleged conduct to be lawful." There was then a rehearing by the full panel en banc in the Fifth Circuit, which reversed the prior panel and unanimously reaffirmed the District Court's dismissal of the case, saying that regardless of whether Hernández Güereca had 5th Amendment rights or not, Mesa was entitled to qualified immunity because he could not have been aware that his actions would not qualify for immunity under the circumstances, since there had not been prior case law to settle the issue.

== At the Supreme Court ==
=== First consideration and its aftermath ===
The case was then heard by the U.S. Supreme Court in February 2017.

==== Majority opinion ====
In June 2017, the Supreme Court reversed part of the Court of Appeals's ruling and requested reconsideration by the Court of Appeals to address Hernández Güereca's claim of 4th Amendment rights and the impact of another Supreme Court decision that was reached at about the same time in the case of Ziglar v. Abbasi. Neil Gorsuch did not participate in the consideration or decision of the case, as he had joined the court after the case was heard.

==== Dissents ====
Justice Clarence Thomas filed a dissent, as did Stephen Breyer, who was joined by Ruth Bader Ginsburg. Thomas said he would have restricted the application of the prior rulings to not apply to cross-border actions and would have simply affirmed the ruling of the Court of Appeals. Breyer and Ginsburg said that since the incident occurred in a border zone of overlapping jurisdiction in which both governments had a management responsibility, and since Mesa also could not have known for certain whether Hernández Güereca was a U.S. citizen or not, his actions should be judged as if they had occurred within the United States.

==== Reconsideration in lower court ====
The Court of Appeals then again upheld the dismissal of the case by the lower court.

=== Second consideration ===
The case reached the Supreme Court for a second time in November 2019. On behalf of the Trump Administration, the Department of Justice filed an amicus brief arguing that such actions of border agents should be immune from liability even if the entire incident had clearly occurred within the United States "ten miles from the border". The Mexican government filed an amicus brief saying that failing to provide an effective remedy when fundamental rights were violated would undermine U.S. human rights obligations, saying that "A nation's obligations to respect human rights do not stop at its borders but apply anywhere that the nation exercises effective control."

==== Majority opinion ====
The Court issued its decision on February 25, 2020, which upheld the Fifth Circuit decision. Writing for a 5–4 majority, Justice Samuel Alito ruled against Hernandez and held that the Court's precedent under Bivens did not extend to cross-border shootings. The Court concluded that the petitioners' Bivens claim arose under a new and significantly different context (a cross-border shooting) than in previous claims by other defendants and also concluded that expanding Bivens would interfere with the executive branch's lead role in setting foreign policy and also interfere with border security. The majority opinion also stated that the Supreme Court would violate constitutional separation of powers by extending Bivens to additional categories of cases and that it is up to the United States Congress to design a remedy for this type of case.

==== Concurrence ====
Writing separately, Justice Clarence Thomas concurred with the majority opinion but also said that Bivens may have been wrongly decided and should be discarded as a precedent. In his concurrence, he said that in recent years the Supreme Court has been less and less willing to create or expand implied causes of action beyond what Congress has explicitly authorized by statute. He cited as an example Alexander v. Sandoval, a 2001 case in which the Supreme Court rejected the idea that a court could create an implied private right action under a regulation enacted under title VI of the Civil Rights Act. He asserted that adhering even to a limited form of Bivens risks usurping the power of the legislature.

==== Dissent ====
Justice Ruth Bader Ginsburg wrote a dissent, which was joined by Justices Stephen Breyer, Sonia Sotomayor, and Elena Kagan. In her dissent, Ginsburg stated that the circumstances of the cross-border shooting were not in fact a "new" context under the Bivens analysis and that the majority opinion was incorrect in suggesting that foreign policy or national security would be impaired by allowing the litigation to go forward. She referred to the strong similarities between the current case as well as the circumstances under the original Bivens case, as well as the fact that the United States has the authority to govern the conduct of its U.S. Border Patrol officers.

== See also ==
- Shooting of José Rodríguez
