= Federal Rules of Appellate Procedure =

Rules of appellate procedure in the United States courts of appeals

The Federal Rules of Appellate Procedure (abbreviated FRAP; cited as Fed. R. App. P.) are a set of rules promulgated by the Supreme Court of the United States on recommendation of an advisory committee to govern procedures in cases in the United States courts of appeals. The rules were first adopted in 1967 and have been amended since then.

In addition to the FRAP, procedure in the courts of appeals is governed by applicable statutes (particularly Title 28 of the United States Code) and by local rules adopted by each individual court. Many of these local rules incorporate Federal Rules of Appellate Procedure by reference.

== See also ==
- Procedures of the Supreme Court of the United States
