= William J. Brennan Jr. =

U.S. Supreme Court justice from 1956 to 1990

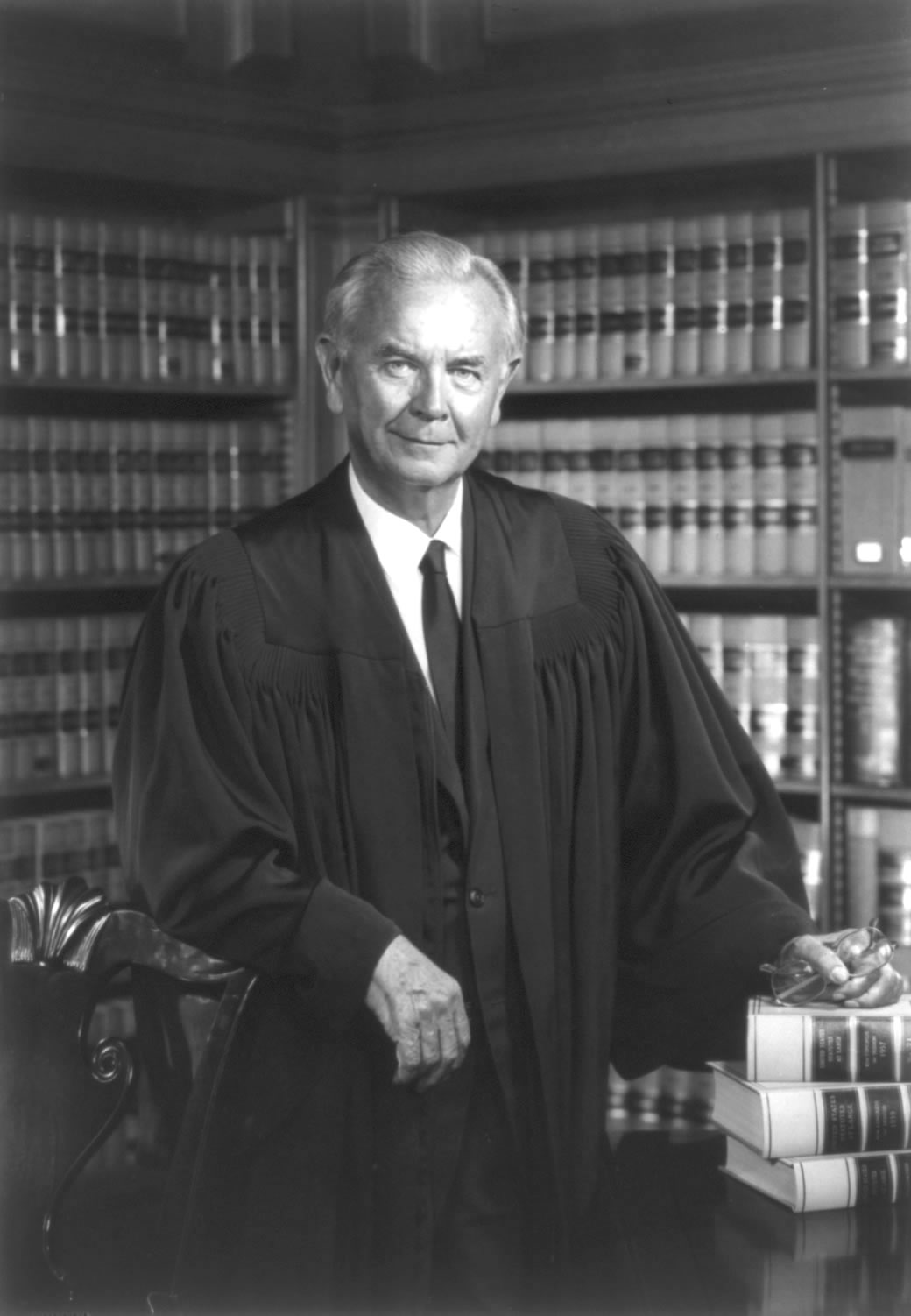
- Official portrait, 1972

Associate Justice of the Supreme Court of the United States
- In office October 16, 1956 – July 20, 1990
- Nominated by: Dwight D. Eisenhower
- Preceded by: Sherman Minton
- Succeeded by: David Souter

Associate Justice of the New Jersey Supreme Court
- In office April 1, 1951 – October 13, 1956
- Nominated by: Alfred E. Driscoll
- Preceded by: Henry E. Ackerson Jr.
- Succeeded by: Joseph Weintraub

Personal details
- Born: William Joseph Brennan Jr. April 25, 1906 Newark, New Jersey, U.S.
- Died: July 24, 1997 (aged 91) Arlington, Virginia, U.S.
- Resting place: Arlington National Cemetery
- Party: Democratic
- Spouses: Marjorie Leonard (m. 1927; died 1982); Mary Fowler (m. 1983)
- Children: 3
- Education: University of Pennsylvania (BS); Harvard University (LLB)

Military service
- Allegiance: United States
- Branch/service: United States Army
- Years of service: 1942–1946
- Rank: Colonel
- Battles/wars: World War II
- Awards: Legion of Merit
- William J. Brennan Jr.'s voice William J. Brennan Jr. delivers the opinion of the Court in Penn Central Transportation Co. v. New York City; Recorded June 26, 1978

William Joseph Brennan Jr. (April 25, 1906 – July 24, 1997) was an American lawyer and jurist who served as an associate justice of the Supreme Court of the United States from 1956 to 1990. He was the eighth-longest serving justice in Supreme Court history, and was known for being a leader of the Court's liberal wing.

Born to Irish immigrant parents in Newark, New Jersey, Brennan studied economics at the University of Pennsylvania and then attended Harvard Law School. He entered private legal practice in New Jersey and served in the U.S. Army during World War II. He was appointed in 1951 to the Supreme Court of New Jersey. Shortly before the 1956 presidential election, President Dwight D. Eisenhower used a recess appointment to place Brennan on the Supreme Court. Brennan won Senate confirmation the following year. He remained on the Court until his retirement in 1990, and was succeeded by David Souter.

On the Supreme Court, Brennan was known for his outspoken progressive views, including opposition to the death penalty as he dissented in more than 1,400 cases in which the Supreme Court refused to review a death sentence, and support for abortion rights and gay rights. He authored numerous landmark case opinions, including: Baker v. Carr (1962), establishing that the apportionment of legislative districts is a justiciable issue; New York Times Co. v. Sullivan (1964), which required "actual malice" in libel suits brought by public officials; Eisenstadt v. Baird (1972), which established a legal right to contraception for unmarried people and helped solidify the sexual revolution; and Craig v. Boren (1976) which established that laws which discriminate on the basis of sex are subject to heightened scrutiny under the Equal Protection Clause.

Due to his ability to shape a wide variety of opinions and bargain for votes in many cases, he was considered to be among the Court's most influential members. Associate Justice Antonin Scalia, who served alongside Brennan between 1986 and 1990, called Brennan "probably the most influential Justice of the [20th] century."

== Early life and education ==
William J. Brennan Jr. was born on April 25, 1906, in Newark, New Jersey, the second of eight children. Both his parents, William and Agnes (McDermott) Brennan, were Irish immigrants. They met in the United States, although both were originally from County Roscommon in Ireland. William Brennan Sr. had little education and worked as a metal polisher, but rose to a position of leadership, serving as the Commissioner of Public Safety for the city of Newark from 1927 to 1930.

Brennan attended public schools in Newark, and graduated from Barringer High School in 1924. He was accepted to Princeton University, but enrolled at the University of Pennsylvania at his father's wishes. After spending a year in the College of Arts & Sciences, Brennan transferred to the Wharton School, graduating in 1928 with a Bachelor of Arts in economics, cum laude. While there, he joined Delta Tau Delta fraternity. Brennan then attended Harvard Law School, where he was a member of the Harvard Legal Aid Bureau. He graduated in 1931 with a Bachelor of Laws ranked near the top of his class.

When he was 21, Brennan married Marjorie Leonard, whom he had met in high school. They eventually had three children: William III, Nancy, and Hugh.

== Early legal career and military service ==
After graduating from Harvard Law School, Brennan entered private practice in his home state of New Jersey, where he practiced labor law at the firm of Pitney Hardin (which would later become Day Pitney). During World War II, Brennan was commissioned in the Army as a major in March 1942, and left as a colonel in 1946. He did legal work for the ordnance division and earned the Legion of Merit Award. In early 1946, he served as a staff member of the United States Undersecretary of War. Later that year, he returned to Pitney Hardin and continued his practice for the next three years. His partners added his name to the firm shortly after his return.

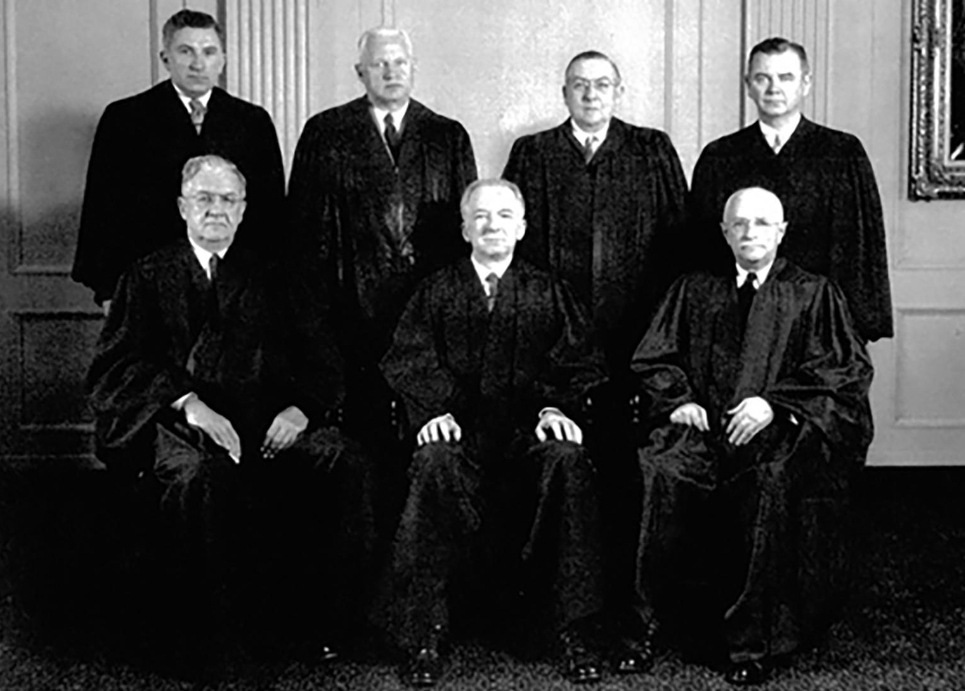
The New Jersey Supreme Court, 1955, Brennan is standing in the back row, far right

In 1949, Brennan was appointed to the Superior Court (a trial court) by Governor of New Jersey Alfred E. Driscoll. In 1951, Driscoll appointed him to the Supreme Court of New Jersey.

== Supreme Court ==
=== Supreme Court appointment ===
Brennan was given a recess appointment as an associate justice of the United States Supreme Court by President Dwight D. Eisenhower on October 15, 1956, shortly before the 1956 presidential election, and was sworn into office the following day. The president's advisers thought the appointment of a Catholic Democrat from the Northeast would woo critical voters in the upcoming re-election campaign for Eisenhower, a Republican. Cardinal Francis Spellman had asked Eisenhower to appoint a Catholic to the court. Brennan was one of two candidates who met Eisenhower's three criteria: experience on lower courts; relative youth and good health; and a Catholic.

Brennan gained the attention of Herbert Brownell, United States Attorney General and Eisenhower's chief legal affairs adviser, when Brennan had to give a speech at a conference (as a substitute for New Jersey Supreme Court Chief Justice Arthur Vanderbilt). To Brownell, Brennan's speech seemed to suggest a marked conservatism, especially on criminal matters.

His nomination, formally submitted to the Senate Judiciary Committee on January 14, 1957, faced a small amount of controversy from two angles. The National Liberal League opposed the nomination of a Catholic, thinking he would rely on his religious beliefs rather than the Constitution when ruling, and Senator Joseph McCarthy had read transcripts of Brennan's speech where he decried overzealous anti-Communist investigations as "witch-hunts." After a confirmation hearing in which Brennan defended himself against McCarthy's attacks and proclaimed that he would rule solely on the basis of the Constitution and not on Church law, he was confirmed by a near-unanimous vote, with only Senator McCarthy voting against him.

Other factors playing into Brennan's appointment were his status as a state court judge – no state judge had been appointed to the High Court since Benjamin N. Cardozo in 1932 – and Eisenhower's desire to appear bipartisan after his appointments of two Republicans: Earl Warren (former Governor of California) and John Marshall Harlan II.

Brennan filled the seat vacated by Justice Sherman Minton. He held the post until his retirement on July 20, 1990, for health reasons; he was succeeded on the Court by Justice David Souter. He was the last federal judge in active service to have been appointed to his position by President Eisenhower. (Note: One of Eisenhower's circuit court appointees, Harry Blackmun, would be appointed to the Supreme Court in 1970 by Richard Nixon and remain active on the Supreme Court until 1994; one Eisenhower district court appointee, Frank Minis Johnson, would be appointed by Jimmy Carter to the Fifth Circuit and remain in active service as a circuit court judge on the newly created Eleventh Circuit until 1991, while a third surviving Eisenhower appointee, Giles Rich of the United States Court of Customs and Patent Appeals, would remain in active service on the Federal Circuit until 1999.) Brennan then taught at Georgetown University Law Center until 1994. With 1,360 opinions, he is second only to William O. Douglas in number of opinions written while a Supreme Court justice.

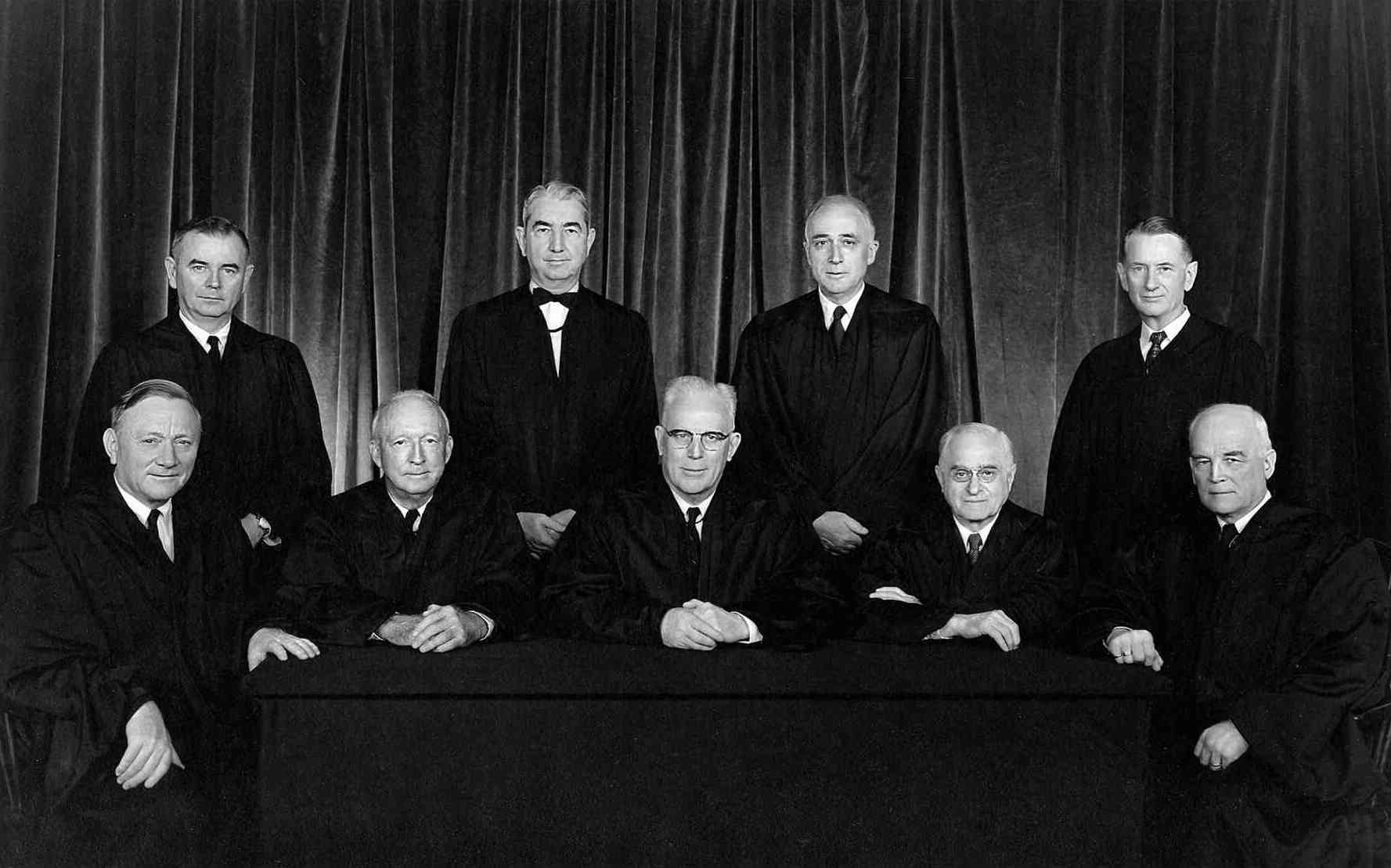
Warren Court, Brennan is standing at far left

=== Warren Court ===
An outspoken liberal throughout his career, he played a leading role in the Warren Court's expansion of individual rights. Brennan played a behind-the-scenes role during the Warren Court, coaxing more conservative colleagues to join the Court's decisions. Brennan's opinions with respect to voting (Baker v. Carr), criminal proceedings (Malloy v. Hogan), the free speech and establishment clauses of the First Amendment (Roth v. United States), and civil rights (Green v. County School Board of New Kent County) were some of the most important opinions of the Warren Era. Brennan's role in expanding free speech rights under the First Amendment is particularly notable, as he wrote the Court's opinion in 1964's New York Times Co. v. Sullivan, which created constitutional restrictions on the law of libel. It was Brennan who coined the phrase "chilling effect", in 1965's Dombrowski v. Pfister. His close friendship with Chief Justice Warren, who frequently assigned Brennan the task of writing the majority opinion, led to the other justices nicknaming him the "deputy Chief".

In the 1962–1963 term, one of Brennan's law clerks was Richard A. Posner, who later became a founder of the field of law and economics and one of the most influential legal scholars in the United States.

=== Burger and Rehnquist Courts ===
On the less liberal Burger Court, Brennan was a staunch opponent of the death penalty and a supporter of abortion rights and joined the majority in landmark rulings on both issues (Furman v. Georgia (1972) on the death penalty and Roe v. Wade (1973) on abortion). With the departure of moderate Potter Stewart in 1981, the ascension of the most conservative member of the court, William Rehnquist, to the position of Chief Justice, following the retirement of Warren Burger, Brennan found himself more frequently isolated. At times, his opinions would be joined only by Thurgood Marshall since, by 1975, they were the last remaining liberals of the Warren Court. (Note: Byron White was the third survivor of the Warren Court during Rehnquist's tenure but often sided with the conservatives, especially on cases involving criminals or abortion.) That like-mindedness led to both Brennan and Marshall's clerks referring to them as "Justice Brennan-Marshall" in the face of the court's heavy conservative opposition to the two. Brennan declared in Furman that he believed the death penalty violated the Eighth Amendment's prohibition on "cruel and unusual" punishment, and for his remaining years on the bench, he and Marshall dissented from every case upholding the imposition of the death penalty. He failed to convince any other justice of this opinion, except Justice Harry Blackmun, but only in 1994, after Brennan's retirement.

Brennan authored three Supreme Court opinions holding that a plaintiff has a cause of action for money damages (compensatory and punitive) arising solely out of an alleged violation of the Bill of Rights. In Bivens v. Six Unknown Named Agents, Brennan so held with respect to the Unreasonable Search and Seizure clause of the Fourth Amendment. In Davis v. Passman, Brennan extended this rationale to the equal protection component of the Due Process Clause of the Fifth Amendment, in a suit for gender discrimination in employment against a former Congressman (Congressional staffers were explicitly excluded from Title VII of the Civil Rights Act). In Carlson v. Green, Brennan extended this rationale again to the Cruel and Unusual Punishment clause of the Eighth Amendment, in a suit by the estate of a deceased federal prisoner (even though the plaintiff also had a cause of action under the Federal Tort Claims Act).

During the same period, Brennan began to adopt and promote a coherent and expansive vision of personal jurisdiction. He authored the sole dissent in Helicopteros Nacionales de Colombia, S. A. v. Hall, defining minimum contacts very broadly for the purposes of general jurisdiction, and influential dissents and partial concurrences in World-Wide Volkswagen Corp. v. Woodson and Asahi Metal Industry Co. v. Superior Court on the subject of specific jurisdiction, holding to a simple "stream-of-commerce" analysis for product liability cases and emphasizing the role of fairness in the Court's analysis of the holding in International Shoe Co. v. Washington. In Burger King v. Rudzewicz, Brennan authored the majority opinion and extended his broad view of personal jurisdiction to areas of business contracts and franchising. The upshot of Brennan's analysis is an expansion of the jurisdiction of state courts, particularly over corporations; state courts are typically more sympathetic to small, weak plaintiffs than to large, powerful corporate defendants. In this process, he frequently clashed with Justice Scalia over this issue, and uncharacteristically dissented from Justice Marshall's majority opinion on the subject in Shaffer v. Heitner.

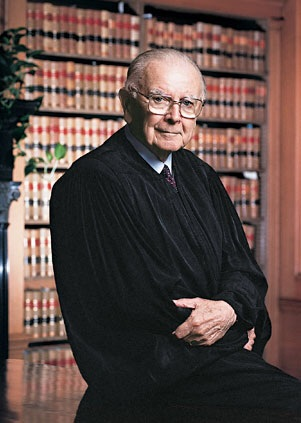
Brennan in his later years

In his penultimate and final terms on the Court, he wrote the controversial majority opinions for Texas v. Johnson and United States v. Eichman, respectively. In both cases, the Court held that the First Amendment protects desecration of the United States flag.

Brennan's wife Marjorie died in December 1982. Slightly more than three months later, in March 1983 at age 76, he married Mary Fowler, who had served as his secretary for 26 years. Brennan's colleagues learned of his second marriage via a short office memo stating, "Mary Fowler and I were married yesterday and we have gone to Bermuda."

=== Judicial philosophy ===
Brennan strongly believed in the Bill of Rights, arguing early on in his career that it should be applied to the states in addition to the federal government. He often took positions in favor of individual rights against the state, favoring criminal defendants, minorities, the poor, and other underrepresented groups. Furthermore, he generally shied away from the absolutist liberal positions of Justices Hugo Black and William O. Douglas, being very amenable to compromise in order to win a majority of Justices. Brennan's conservative detractors charged that he was a purveyor of judicial activism, accusing him of deciding outcomes before coming up with a legal rationale for them. At his retirement, Brennan said the case he thought was most important was Goldberg v. Kelly, which ruled that a local, state or federal government could not terminate welfare payments to a person without a prior individual evidentiary hearing.

In the 1980s, as the Reagan administration and the Rehnquist Court threatened to "roll back" the decisions of the Warren Court, Brennan became more vocal about his jurisprudential views. In a 1985 speech at Georgetown University, Brennan criticized Attorney General Edwin Meese's call for a "jurisprudence of original intention" as "arrogance cloaked as humility" and advocated reading the U.S. Constitution to protect rights of "human dignity".

Brennan was also less interested in stare decisis or the avoidance of "absolutist" positions where the death penalty was concerned, as he believed that the deliberate taking of human life by the state, as a punishment, was inherently cruel and unusual. Brennan and Thurgood Marshall, Brennan's closest ally in the Court, concluded in Furman v. Georgia that the death penalty was, in all circumstances, unconstitutional, and never accepted the legitimacy of Gregg v. Georgia, which ruled that the death penalty was constitutional four years later. Thereafter, Brennan or Marshall took turns, joined by the other, in issuing a dissent in every denial of certiorari in a capital case, and from every decision in a case which the Court did take which failed to vacate a sentence of death.

Brennan also authored a dissent from the denial of certiorari in Glass v. Louisiana. In Glass, the Court chose not to hear a case that challenged the constitutionality of the use of the electric chair as a form of execution. Brennan wrote:

Th[e] evidence suggests that death by electrical current is extremely violent and inflicts pain and indignities far beyond the "mere extinguishment of life". Witnesses routinely report that, when the switch is thrown, the condemned prisoner "cringes," "leaps," and "fights the straps with amazing strength." "The hands turn red, then white, and the cords of the neck stand out like steel bands." The prisoner's limbs, fingers, toes, and face are severely contorted. The force of the electrical current is so powerful that the prisoner's eyeballs sometimes pop out and "rest on [his] cheeks." The prisoner often defecates, urinates, and vomits blood and drool.

Brennan concluded by stating that electrocution is "nothing less than the contemporary technological equivalent of burning people at the stake." Despite his personal stance against the death penalty, Brennan implicitly acknowledged its current reality by offering his thoughts in other legal aspects of court cases, if capital punishment was to apply to the given case. In Strickland v. Washington, a case involving a capital defendant, although Brennan disagreed with keeping the verdict of death sentence, his concurrence agreed with the test for ineffective assistance of counsel that the majority opinion established. (Marshall dissented in this case, objecting to the new test and stating that the counsel in the trial was ineffective.)

Brennan voted with the majority in Roe v. Wade which legalized abortion nationally and helped craft the decision. Brennan wrote the majority opinion in Roth v. United States which set new standards for obscenity laws, allowing some prosecutions, but drastically loosening the laws overall. He later reversed his position in dissent in Miller v. California arguing that obscenity laws were unconstitutional. Although Brennan joined the majority in United States v. O'Brien which upheld the constitutionality of laws banning draft card burning, he later opposed the Vietnam War and dissented several times when the Supreme Court refused to hear challenges to its legality. In a dissent in San Antonio Independent School District v. Rodriguez Brennan argued that unequal funding of poor and wealthy school districts violated the Equal Protection Clause.

Brennan supported gay rights. In a dissent from a denial of certiorari in 1985 involving a lesbian teacher fired for her sexual orientation, Brennan publicly criticized homophobia, writing "Homosexuals have historically been the object of deep and sustained pernicious hostility, and it is fair to say that discrimination against homosexuals is likely to reflect deep-seated prejudice rather than rationality." He joined the dissent in Bowers v. Hardwick, which allowed states to prosecute consensual homosexual sodomy, a decision which the Court announced in June 1986.

He is regarded as one of the most liberal justices in the history of the court.

== Later life and death ==
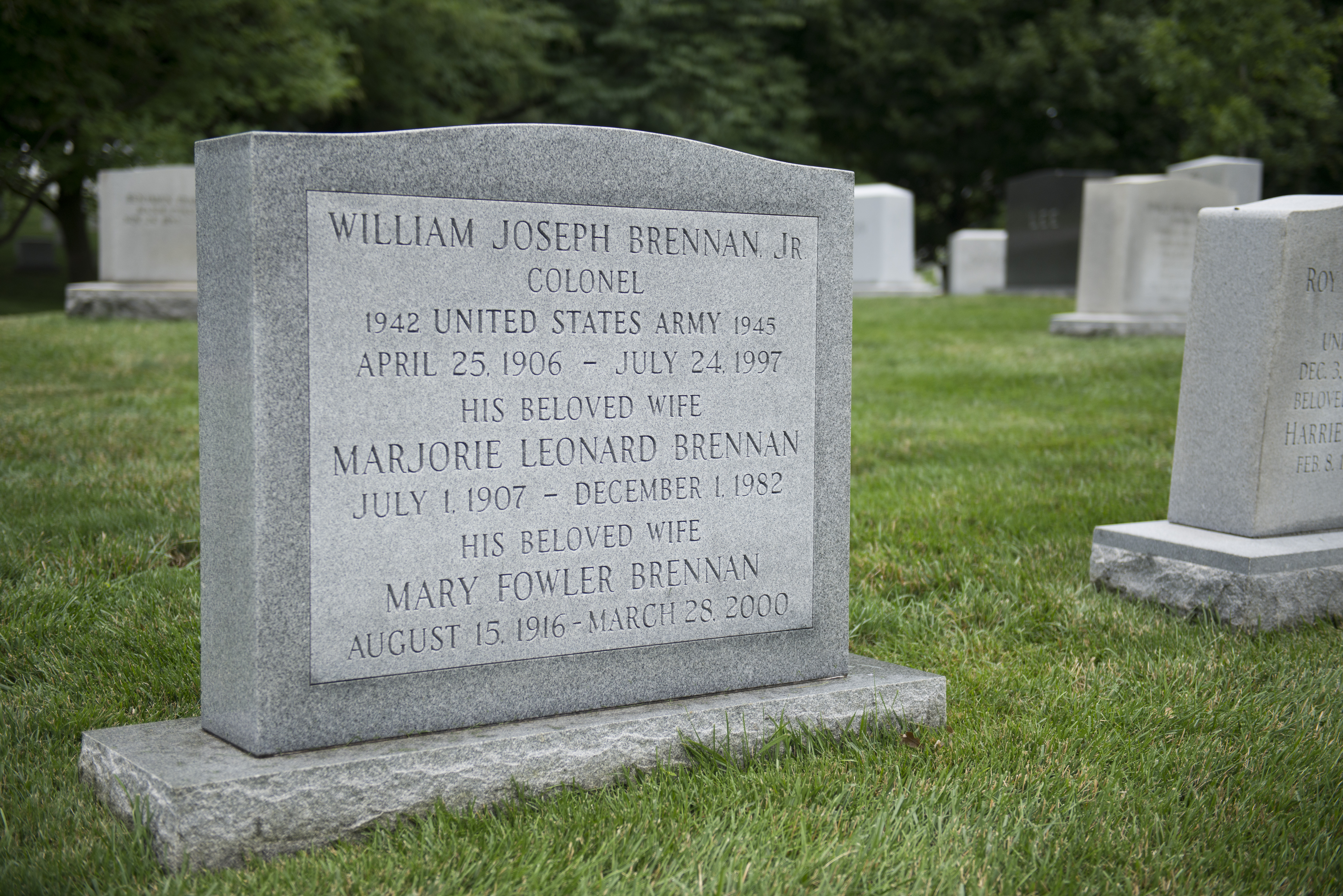
Brennan's gravesite

Brennan's retirement in 1990 was precipitated by a mild stroke. While he initially intended to continue serving, his doctors told him that he would be at risk of a more debilitating stroke if he kept working.

Throughout retirement, Brennan maintained a friendly relationship with his successor, David Souter. In 1995, the Brennan Center for Justice opened at New York University, a research institute created at the initiative of several of Brennan's former clerks, and named in his honor.

In November 1996, Brennan fell and broke his hip, and underwent rehabilitation for the injury at a nursing home in Arlington, Virginia, where he died on July 24, 1997, at the age of 91. He was buried at Arlington National Cemetery, beside his first wife and near the gravesites of other Supreme Court justices. Upon her death in 2000, Mary Fowler Brennan was also buried in the same gravesite.

== Honors and awards ==
As a result of his long and distinguished career on the United States Supreme Court, Brennan was honored with many different awards. In 1969, he was awarded the Laetare Medal by the University of Notre Dame, considered the most prestigious award for American Catholics. In 1987, Brennan received the U.S. Senator John Heinz Award for Greatest Public Service by an Elected or Appointed Official, an award given out annually by Jefferson Awards. In 1989, the historic Hudson County Courthouse in Jersey City, New Jersey, which had opened in 1910, was renamed the William J. Brennan Court House in his honor and, in that same year, he received the Freedom Medal. On November 30, 1993, President Bill Clinton presented Brennan with the Presidential Medal of Freedom.

Upon his death, Brennan lay in repose in the Great Hall of the United States Supreme Court Building.

Years after his death, in 2010, Brennan was inducted into the New Jersey Hall of Fame and William J. Brennan High School was founded in San Antonio, Texas, honoring him. Brennan Park across from the historic Essex County Veterans Courthouse in Newark, New Jersey, was named in Brennan's honor and a statue of him was erected in front of the Essex County Hall of Records by historian Guy Sterling.

== See also ==
- Brennan Center for Justice
- List of justices of the Supreme Court of the United States
- List of law clerks for the third seat of the Supreme Court of the United States
- List of United States Supreme Court justices by time in office
- List of United States federal judges by longevity of service
- United States Supreme Court cases during the Burger Court
- United States Supreme Court cases during the Rehnquist Court
- United States Supreme Court cases during the Warren Court
- William J. Brennan Award

== Sources ==
- Abraham, Henry J. (1992). Justices and Presidents: A Political History of Appointments to the Supreme Court (3rd ed.). New York: Oxford University Press. ISBN 0-19-506557-3.
- Cushman, Clare (2001). The Supreme Court Justices: Illustrated Biographies, 1789–1995 (2nd ed.). Supreme Court Historical Society, Congressional Quarterly Books. ISBN 1-56802-126-7.
- Eisler, Kim Isaac (1993). A Justice for All: William J. Brennan Jr. and the Decisions That Transformed America. New York: Simon & Schuster. ISBN 978-0-671-76787-7.
- Frank, John P. (1995). Friedman, Leon; Israel, Fred L. (eds.). The Justices of the United States Supreme Court: Their Lives and Major Opinions. New York: Chelsea House. ISBN 0-7910-1377-4.
- Hudson, David L. (2006). The Rehnquist Court: Understanding Its Impact and Legacy. New York: Praeger. ISBN 0-275-98971-2.
- Hall, Kermit L., ed. (1992). The Oxford Companion to the Supreme Court of the United States. New York: Oxford University Press. ISBN 0-19-505835-6.
- Martin, Fenton S.; Goehlert, Robert U. (1990). The U.S. Supreme Court: A Bibliography. Washington, D.C.: Congressional Quarterly Books. ISBN 0-87187-554-3.
- Schwartz, Herman (2003). The Rehnquist Court: Judicial Activism on the Right. New York: Hill and Wang. ISBN 978-0-8090-8074-8.
- Stern, Seth, and Stephen Wermiel. Justice Brennan: liberal champion (Houghton Mifflin Harcourt, 2010), 674 pages; detailed scholarly biography
- Tushnet, Mark (2005). A Court Divided: The Rehnquist Court and the Future of Constitutional Law. New York: W. W. Norton Co. ISBN 978-0-393-32757-1.
- Urofsky, Melvin I. (1994). The Supreme Court Justices: A Biographical Dictionary. New York: Garland. p. 590. ISBN 0-8153-1176-1.
- Woodward, Robert; Armstrong, Scott (1979). The Brethren: Inside the Supreme Court. New York. ISBN 978-0-380-52183-8.
- Wermiel, Stephen, and Seth Stern. Justice Brennan: Liberal Champion (Houghton Mifflin Harcourt, 2010) 688pp excerpt and text search Archived July 31, 2021, at the Wayback Machine, based on Brennan's case notes and 50 hours of interviews
- Remarks by the President in Ceremony Honoring Medal of Freedom Recipients – November 30, 1993 Archived June 8, 2010, at the Wayback Machine

Legal offices
Preceded by Sherman Minton	Associate Justice of the Supreme Court of the United States; 1956–1990	Succeeded by David Souter
