= Semayne's case =

English tort case regarding police entry into homes

- Court: Court of King's Bench
- Full case name: Peter Semayne v Richard Gresham
- Decided: Michaelmas Term, 1604
- Citations: All ER Rep 62; 5 Co Rep 91 a Cro Eliz 908; Moore KB 668; Yelv 29; 77 ER 194

Court membership
- Judges sitting: John Popham CJ; Francis Gawdy J Edward Fenner J Christopher Yelverton J David Williams J

Keywords
- Knock-and-announce rule; Castle doctrine

Semayne's Case (1 January 1604) 5 Coke Rep. 91, is an English common law case reported by Sir Edward Coke, who was then the Attorney General for England and Wales. In the United States, it is recognized as establishing the "knock-and-announce" rule.

== Facts ==
Richard Gresham and George Berisford were joint tenants of a house in Blackfriars, London. Berisford died while in debt to Peter Semayne. Semayne then secured a civil writ of attachment on Berisford's goods, which were located inside the house. After the Sheriff of London was denied entry by Gresham, the sheriff offered to break and enter into the house. Instead, Semayne sued, bringing an action on the case against Gresham for his losses.

Initially, the court could not reach a decision, with Lord Chief Justice John Popham and Lord Justice Francis Gawdy believing the sheriff could break and enter, while Lord Justices Edward Fenner and Christopher Yelverton insisting he could not. After the coronation of James I and Anne and the appointment of Lord Justice David Williams to the bench, the case was reargued.

== Judgment ==
In 1604, the Court of King's Bench gave judgment against Semayne. The court resolved:

- It is not a felony for a man to defend his house to the death.
- Sheriffs may break and enter to recover seisin over real estate.
- Sheriffs may break and enter on the king's business after a request for entry is refused.
- Sheriffs may enter when the door is open.
- The householder's privilege does not extend to strangers or their goods.
- Sheriffs should request entry in civil cases.

As authority, Coke reported citation to a statute enacted by King Edward III of England in 1275, which he said merely affirmed the pre-existing common law.

The holding of the case can best be summed by Coke's words:

[I]n all cases when the King is party, the sheriff may (if the doors be not open) break the party's house, either to arrest him, or to do other execution of the King's process, if he cannot otherwise enter. But he ought to signify the cause of his coming, and to make request to open the doors.

The case is also famous for Coke's quote:

the house of every one is to him as his castle and fortress, as well for his defence against injury and violence, as for his repose.

== Influence ==
In 1605, Coke published the case in the fifth volume of his Reports. After his Petition of Right, Coke, in his Institutes of the Lawes of England, adopted the view alone that warrants issued on bare suspicion violate Magna Carta. After the Interregnum, Sir Matthew Hale wrote in his Historia Placitorum Coronæ that an arrest without a warrant could be made by forced entry.

After the Glorious Revolution, William Hawkins and Sir Michael Foster thought no forced entry was permissible if a warrant issued on bare suspicion. In his Commentaries on the Laws of England, Sir William Blackstone emphasized the castle doctrine but took the view that forced entry was permitted if the suspected felony had actually occurred.

The rule was relied upon in the landmark case of Entick v Carrington [KB 1765], when Lord Camden held that no general warrant could issue on suspicion of seditious libel. Lord Mansfield, however, was skeptical of limits to forced entry by holding in 1772 that officials were allowed to obtain entry by fraud and in 1774 that the limit applied only to a dwelling's outer door.

The sentiment of "an Englishman's home is his castle" became very popular, with William Pitt, 1st Earl of Chatham famously speaking against the Cider Bill of 1763 by telling Parliament:

The poorest man may, in his cottage, bid defiance to all the force of the Crown. It may be frail; its roof may shake; the wind may blow through it; the storm may enter; but all his force dares not cross the threshold of the ruined tenement.

Blackstone's language on the castle doctrine was also very popular in the United States, where it was widely followed by state courts. In Miller v. United States (1958), the US Supreme Court recognized that police must give notice before making a forced entry and in Ker v. California (1963), a divided Court discovered that the limitation was extended to the states by the US Constitution.

However, in Wilson v. Arkansas (1995) the US Supreme Court created an exception to prevent the destruction of evidence and in Hudson v. Michigan (2006), it held in a 5–4 vote that the exclusionary rule does not require the suppression of evidence seized by police during an illegal forced entry.

Recently, police in the United States often give no notice before forced home entry during the widespread use of no-knock warrants.

== See also ==
- Article 8 ECHR
- Entick v Carrington
