= No-knock warrant =

Type of search warrant for law-enforcement entry to property

In the United States, a no-knock warrant is a warrant issued by a judge that allows law enforcement to enter a property without immediate prior notification of the residents, such as by knocking or ringing a doorbell. In most cases, law enforcement will identify themselves just before they forcefully enter the property. It is issued under the belief that any evidence they hope to find may be destroyed between the time that police identify themselves and the time they secure the area, or in the event where there is a large perceived threat to officer safety during the execution of the warrant.

Use of no-knock warrants has increased substantially over time. By one estimate, no-knock or quick-knock raids rose from about 1,500 a year in the early 1980s to 60,000–70,000 a year by 2010, most of them searches for marijuana.

Amid nationwide protests in response to the police shooting of Breonna Taylor and murder of George Floyd, there were extensive calls to end no-knock warrants. Critics argue that no-knock warrants were prone to lead to deadly use of force by police and the deaths of innocent people. They also argue that no-knock warrants conflict with the right to self-defense, "stand-your-ground" laws, and the castle doctrine, which explicitly permit the use of deadly force against intruders.

As of 2025, Florida, Oregon, Tennessee, Washington State, Virginia, and Connecticut ban no-knock warrants; however, state-level bans do not affect federal law enforcement. Thirteen states have laws explicitly permitting no-knock warrants, and most others issue them based on a judge's discretion.

== History ==
In 1970, Congress, acting on a Nixon administration crime bill, gave police in the District of Columbia the power to conduct no-knock raids. A federal statute also authorized no-knock warrants in controlled-substances cases. After a mistaken 1973 federal drug raid on a couple's home in Collinsville, Illinois, drew national press coverage, Congress held hearings, and the federal authorization was repealed in 1974.

The practice returned in the 1980s. After Congress passed the Anti-Drug Abuse Act of 1986, federal and local agencies adopted militarized drug-enforcement strategies that included no-knock raids. It is associated with the militarization of police.

== Law ==
=== Supreme Court ===
English common law has required law enforcement to knock-and-announce since at least Semayne's case (1604), and in Miller v. United States (1958), the Supreme Court of the United States recognized that police must give notice before making a forced entry.

In Ker v. California (1963), the Court set a precedent in favor of forcible entries in drug cases out of concern that evidence could be destroyed. In Wilson v. Arkansas (1995), it held that the manner of entry is part of the Fourth Amendment's reasonableness inquiry, so that an unannounced entry can be unconstitutional, but that police need not knock where there is a risk of danger or of the destruction of evidence. In Richards v. Wisconsin (1997), the Court unanimously rejected a blanket exception to the knock-and-announce rule for felony drug investigations, holding instead that a no-knock entry is justified only when police have "a reasonable suspicion that knocking and announcing their presence, under the particular circumstances, would be dangerous or futile, or that it would inhibit the effective investigation of the crime by, for example, allowing the destruction of evidence." Both rulings left state and local judges wide discretion in deciding what counts as reasonable suspicion.

In United States v. Banks (2003), the Court upheld a forced entry made 15 to 20 seconds after officers with a standard warrant knocked and announced themselves. In Hudson v. Michigan (2006), it held by a 5–4 vote that the exclusionary rule does not require the suppression of evidence police seize during an illegal forced entry.

=== Federal law and policy ===
In federal criminal law, the rule generally requiring knock-and-announce is codified at 18 U.S.C § 3109. A 2002 opinion of the Justice Department's Office of Legal Counsel concluded:

Federal judges and magistrates may lawfully and constitutionally issue "no-knock" warrants where circumstances justify a no-knock entry, and federal law enforcement officers may lawfully apply for such warrants under such circumstances. Although officers need not take affirmative steps to make an independent re-verification of the circumstances already recognized by a magistrate in issuing a no-knock warrant, such a warrant does not entitle officers to disregard reliable information clearly negating the existence of exigent circumstances when they actually receive such information before execution of the warrant.

The Department of Justice adopted a policy in September 2021 limiting no-knock entries by its agents to situations where physical safety was at stake. Executive Order 14074, signed by President Joe Biden in May 2022, extended those limits to all federal law enforcement agencies and required annual public reports on no-knock entries. President Donald Trump revoked the order on January 20, 2025, through Executive Order 14148. In March 2026, Deputy Attorney General Todd Blanche rescinded the 2021 policy.

=== State law ===
As of 2025, six states had banned no-knock warrants: Connecticut, Florida, Oregon, Tennessee, Virginia and Washington. Oregon's prohibition is statutory, and Florida's rests on a 1994 state supreme court decision. Virginia enacted its ban in 2020, and Tennessee followed in 2021. A 2021 Washington law bars officers from seeking, and courts from issuing, a warrant with an express exception to the knock-and-announce rule.

Other states restrict the practice without banning it. Utah bars forcible entry when the only suspected offense is drug possession, and a 2021 Maine law limits no-knock warrants to certain high-risk situations and requires the use of body cameras.

A 2017 New York Times survey found that 13 states had statutes authorizing no-knock warrants, another 13 allowed them through appellate court rulings, and seven granted them routinely without explicit authority.

== Statistics ==
There is no national count of forcible-entry raids, because no federal rule requires police agencies to report on SWAT operations. The most widely cited estimates, by criminologist Peter Kraska of Eastern Kentucky University, cover SWAT and tactical drug raids of all kinds, including no-knock and other warrants: about 3,000 a year in the early 1980s, rising to more than 60,000 a year. In 2010, Kraska estimated that local police conducted 60,000–70,000 no-knock or quick-knock raids annually, the majority of them looking for marijuana. As of 2006, the Cato Institute had counted forty bystanders killed in such raids since the early 1980s.

In Utah, no-knock warrants made up about 40% of warrants served by SWAT teams in 2014 and 2015, usually for drugs and usually done at night. In Maryland, 90% of SWAT deployments were to serve search warrants, with two-thirds through forced entry.

From 2010 through 2016, at least 81 civilians and 13 officers died in forcible-entry search warrant raids, according to a New York Times investigation: 31 civilians and eight officers during no-knock warrants, and 47 civilians and five officers during knock-and-announce searches. The warrant type could not be determined for three civilian deaths. Half of the civilians killed were members of minority groups. An American Civil Liberties Union study of 20 cities found that 42% of those subjected to SWAT search warrant raids were black and 12% Hispanic. Since 2011, at least seven federal lawsuits over such raids have been settled for more than $1 million.

== Controversy ==
No-knock warrants are controversial for various reasons. There have been cases where burglars have robbed homes by pretending to be officers with a no-knock warrant. There have been many cases where armed homeowners, believing that they are being invaded, have shot at officers, resulting in deaths on both sides. While it is legal to shoot a homeowner's dog when an officer fears for their life, there have been numerous high-profile cases in which family pets lacking the size, strength, or demeanor to attack officers have been shot, greatly increasing the risk of additional casualties in neighboring houses via overpenetrating bullets.

=== Case of Bounkham Phonesavanh ===
On May 27, 2014, in Cornelia, Georgia, a police informant alleged that he had bought $50 of methamphetamine from Wanis Thonetheva, a 30-year-old dealer at a residence belonging to Amanda Thonetheva, his mother. The dealer did not reside at the house, which contained no drugs or weapons, though a family with four young children lived in the house. Sheriff's Deputy Nikki Autry secured a no-knock warrant after awaking a county magistrate at his home and making inaccurate sworn statements to him.

Police executed a no-knock raid at 2:25 am on May 28, with a SWAT team breaching a door with a ram and throwing a flash-bang stun grenade into a room containing a 19-month-old child. The grenade exploded inside the infant's playpen, igniting the playpen and his pillow, causing "blast burn injuries to the face and chest; a complex laceration of the nose, upper lip and face; 20% of the right upper lip missing; the external nose being separated from the underlying bone; and a large avulsion burn injury to the chest with a resulting left pulmonary contusion and sepsis".

The infant, Bounkham Phonesavanh (or "Baby Bou Bou"), was placed in a medically induced coma, and needed a series of surgeries that cost more than a million dollars. He became the subject of a lawsuit against the police department to pay for the medical bills. The legal case argued that children's toys, including a plastic child's pool, were in the yard and the packaging for the playpen the infant was sleeping in was next to the door the police breached. The lawsuit alleged that police were "plainly incompetent" for failing to realize that a child was in the room.

The search yielded no drugs, no drug dealer and no weapons; the drug dealer was arrested the next day without the use of flash-bang grenades.

The civil lawsuit was eventually settled, with the county paying $3.6 million, including approximately $1.65 million in pain and suffering. A Habersham County, Georgia, grand jury declined to indict any of the participants, but did release a strongly worded report. Federal prosecutors then secured an indictment against Deputy Autry. She was acquitted of any wrongdoing by a federal jury after a week-long trial.

== Reform ==
The act of entering someone's home by surprise, often late at night or early in the morning, creates a risk of violence, especially given the prevalence of gun ownership in United States.

Proposals for reform include legislating for a checklist of conditions to be applied for all police search warrants: "with some exceptions, officers should be in uniform; they should do the raid during the day; and they shouldn't rely on out-of-date intelligence about who lives in a targeted home."

In the wake of the Breonna Taylor shooting (March 2020) and the later (May–June 2020) George Floyd protests, the Louisville Metro Council unanimously voted on June 11, 2020, for "Breonna's Law", a ban on no-knock warrants in Louisville, Kentucky. The state of Kentucky restricted but did not ban their use in a law signed on April 9, 2021.

=== Case of Breonna Taylor ===
On March 13, 2020, Louisville Metro Police Department officers shot and killed Breonna Taylor in her apartment after being fired upon by Kenneth Walker, Breonna Taylor's boyfriend, while executing a search warrant shortly after midnight. Although the police had received court approval for a "no-knock" entry, they did knock and announce themselves prior to breaking down the door, according to Kentucky Attorney General Daniel Cameron. However, Walker claims that he only heard banging on the door and no announcement. Walker fired the first shot; Walker said he fired his gun due to not knowing the intruders were police.

Walker was charged with attempted murder of a police officer but the charge was dismissed in May 2020. On September 23, 2020, a grand jury indicted one officer for wanton endangerment for blindly firing shots that entered a neighbors' apartment, but no officers were charged in the death of Taylor. On October 20, 2020, Jefferson County Circuit Court Judge Annie O'Connell ruled that grand jury records could be released, and jurors could speak to the public, after which a grand juror claimed that the grand jury had only considered the charge of wanton endangerment, and did not consider any charges related to the death of Taylor.

=== Other notable cases ===
The Phonesavanh and Taylor cases are described above. Other widely reported cases involving no-knock warrants include the following.

| Date | Place | What happened | Outcome |
|---|---|---|---|
| September 22, 1999 | Denver, Colorado | SWAT officers shot and killed Ismael Mena during a no-knock raid approved on false information in the warrant application. The team had been given the wrong address, and no drugs were found. | The district attorney cleared the officers, saying Mena had pointed and fired a gun at them; who fired first remained in dispute. The American Civil Liberties Union objected that the warrant did not meet the criteria for a no-knock raid. |
| November 21, 2006 | Atlanta, Georgia | Kathryn Johnston, 92, fired one shot through her front door as undercover officers forced entry on a no-knock warrant. Officers fired 39 shots, killing her. | Officers were convicted of manslaughter, making false statements and conspiracy to violate civil rights resulting in death. One was convicted of planting marijuana in the home. |
| December 19, 2013 | Burleson County, Texas | Hank Magee shot and killed a deputy sheriff inside his home during the execution of a no-knock warrant. | A grand jury refused to indict Magee for capital murder. |
| May 9, 2014 | Killeen, Texas | Marvin Guy shot and killed a police detective outside his home during the execution of a no-knock warrant. | Guy was indicted for capital murder. Prosecutors dropped their bid for the death penalty in 2022. In November 2023 a jury convicted him of murder and acquitted him of capital murder. |
| January 28, 2019 | Houston, Texas | Police killed homeowners Dennis Tuttle and Rhogena Nicholas in a no-knock raid on their house (the Pecan Park raid). | Several officers were indicted, including for falsifying documents used to obtain the warrant; one was charged with murder. |
| February 6, 2019 | Milwaukee, Wisconsin | Police officer Matthew Rittner was shot and killed while conducting a no-knock raid. | The shooter, Jordan Fricke, was charged with first-degree intentional homicide, convicted and sentenced to life in prison. |
| February 2, 2022 | Minneapolis, Minnesota | Amir Locke, 22, was shot and killed by a SWAT officer executing a no-knock warrant in which he was not named as a suspect. | Prosecutors declined to charge the officers involved. |

== See also ==
- Raid on Afroman's home (and consequent events)
- Law enforcement in the United States
- Militarization of police
- Sneak and peek warrant
- Police raid
