= United States v. Ramirez =

- Supreme Court of the United States

Argued January 13, 1998 Decided March 4, 1998
- Full case name: United States, Petitioner v. Hernan Ramirez
- Citations: 523 U.S. 65 (more) 91 F. 3d 1297

Case history
- Prior: On writ of certiorari to the United States Court of Appeals for the Ninth Circuit

Holding
- Destruction of property does not affect the reasonableness of a no-knock warrant as long as there is reasonable suspicion that knocking and announcing would be dangerous and/or futile.

Court membership
- Chief Justice William Rehnquist Associate Justices John P. Stevens · Sandra Day O'Connor; Antonin Scalia · Anthony Kennedy; David Souter · Clarence Thomas; Ruth Bader Ginsburg · Stephen Breyer

Case opinion
- Majority: Rehnquist, joined by unanimous

Laws applied
- Amendment IV

United States v. Ramirez, 523 U.S. 65 (1998), was a case before the United States Supreme Court in which the Court held that property damage during a no-knock warrant is irrelevant as long as law enforcement has reasonable suspicion that knocking and announcing would be a dangerous move.

== Background ==
Alan Shelby, a convicted felon serving concurrent federal and state sentences in Oregon, escaped from a Tillamook County Sheriff's vehicle by slipping out of his handcuffs and knocking over a deputy on November 1, 1994. Three years before, he attempted escape by assaulting an officer, kicking open a jail door, carjacking a woman, and ramming into a police vehicle. Additionally, he made death threats to witnesses and police officers, along with threatening torture with hammers. Law enforcement believed he had access to large caches of weapons as well.

After authorities distributed press releases, a confidential informant told the ATF on November 3 that he had seen a man resembling Shelby at Hernan Ramirez's home in Boring, Oregon. The ATF then drove to an area near Ramirez's home where they spotted a man outside that looked like Shelby. The informant further stated that drugs and guns were hidden in the house's garage.

On the early morning of November 5, 45 federal and state officers assembled to execute a no-knock warrant on the home. The police used a loudspeaker to announce the search warrant and broke a garage window simultaneously. Guns were also pointed at the window to dissuade individuals from potentially arming themselves.

Awakened by the noise and believing that people were going to rob his family, Ramirez grabbed a pistol and fired it at the garage's ceiling. He quickly threw his gun away and threw himself on the living room floor to surrender after officers fired back and identified themselves. Although Shelby was ultimately not found, Ramirez confessed after waiving his Miranda rights that he was a convicted felon and that he owned two firearms.

=== Lower courts ===
During trial, the lower court suppressed the firearms as the judge ruled that the exigent circumstances were insufficient to warrant the destruction of property. The United States Court of Appeals for the Ninth Circuit upheld the suppression by elaborating that property destruction requires specific instances of exigency that were not met.

== Supreme Court decision ==
In a unanimous verdict delivered by Chief Justice William Rehnquist, the Court ruled that there is no heightened standard for no-knock warrants if property destruction happened as long as there is reasonable suspicion that knocking and announcing would either result in a life-threatening confrontation or the destruction of evidence. The Court cited Richards v. Wisconsin as precedent that while there is no blanket exception to the knock-and-announce rule, a no-knock warrant is justifiable if there is a high chance of physical threats or tampering of valuable evidence.
