= Feltner =

Feltner may refer to:

- Feltner v. Columbia Pictures Television, Inc., a legal case
- Ryan Feltner, an American baseball player
