= Cider Bill of 1763 =

Proposed British legislation

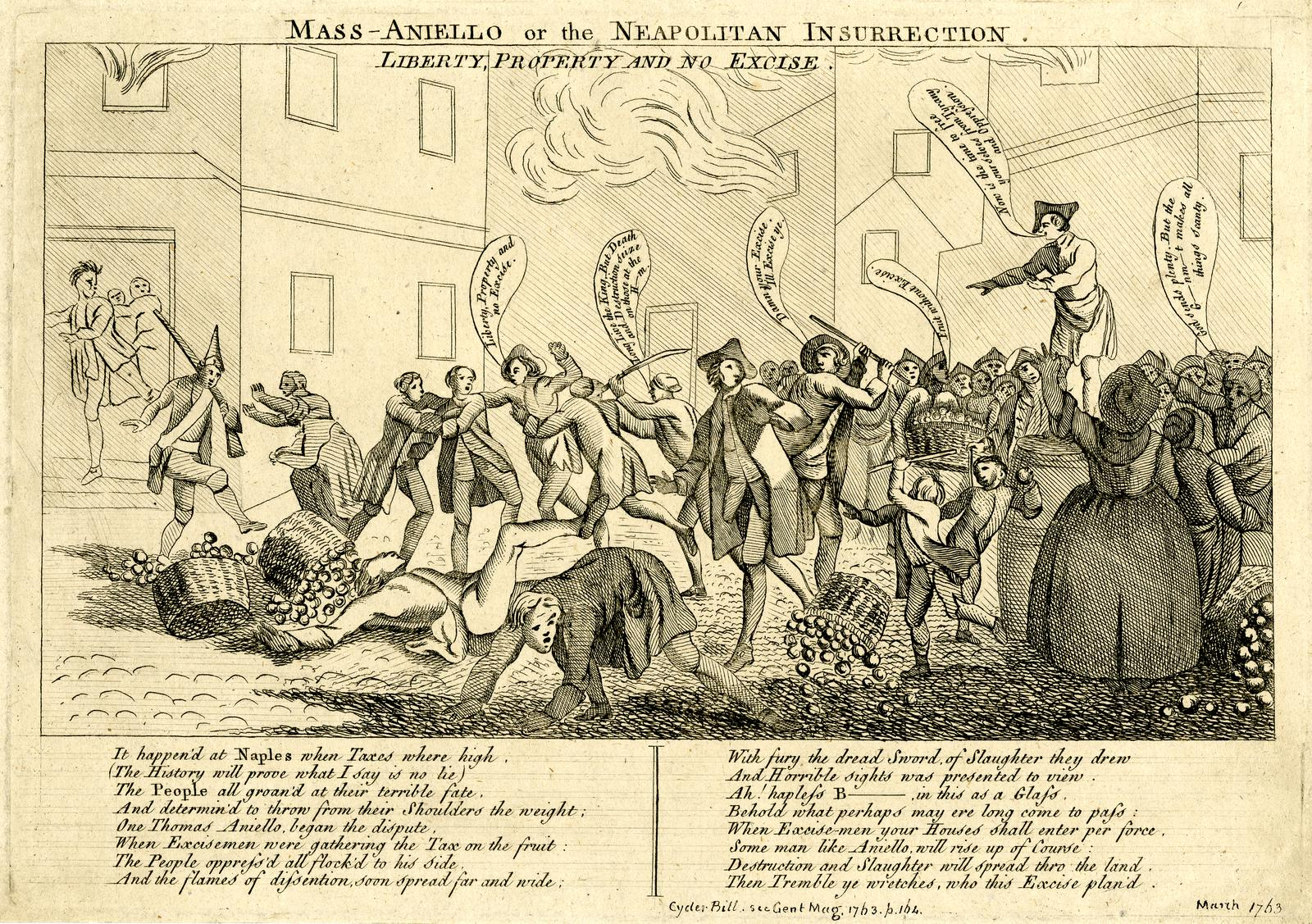
Satire on the cider tax showing a riot in a country town (associated with Masaniello)

The Cider Bill of 1763 was a proposed measure by the British government of Lord Bute to put a tax on the production of cider. Britain's national debt had reached unprecedented levels during the early 1760s following the country's involvement in the Seven Years War which had been very expensive.

== Resignation of Lord Bute and replacement by George Grenville ==
Lord Bute proposed a tax of four shillings which would be levied on every hogshead of cider made. This produced an instant reaction from the cider-producing areas, particularly in the West Country which elected many MPs. Riots broke out and there was widespread outrage against the bill. The dispute added to Bute's growing unpopularity and in mid-1763 he stepped down as Prime Minister. His successor George Grenville pushed through the tax, defeating an opposition motion for repeal in February 1764.

The reaction to the tax has been compared to the similar hostility in the American colonies to the Stamp Act 1765. George Grenville initially went ahead with the Stamp Act because previous bills had not aroused such anger in America as the Cider Tax had in Britain. The tax was repealed in 1766.

== Warrantless searches ==
Some of the strongest words in favour of an individual's privacy from government intrusions into the home were made in the attacks opposing enactment and favouring repeal of this tax because excise taxes allowed warrantless searches. One of William Pitt's best known quotes comes from one of his speeches against this tax.

The poorest man may in his cottage bid defiance to all the forces of the Crown. It may be frail; its roof may shake; the wind may blow through it; the storm may enter; the rain may enter; but the King of England cannot enter – all his force dares not cross the threshold of the ruined tenement!

It was noticed in Miller v. United States, 357 U.S. 301 (1958). The Fourth Amendment to the U.S. Constitution derives from the debates over this tax and over the general warrants issued to suppress anti-Bute publications, especially by John Wilkes and John Entick.

== Bibliography ==
- Anderson, Fred. Crucible of War: The Seven Years' War and the Fate of Empire in British North America, 1754-1766. Faber and Faber, 2000.
- Lawson, Phillip. George Grenville: A political life. Oxford University Press, 1984.
- Parliamentary History of England, London: Hansard, 1813, vol. 16.
