= Rosenberg v. Fleuti =

- Supreme Court of the United States

Argued March 26, 1963 Decided June 17, 1963
- Full case name: George K. Rosenberg, District Director, Immigration and Naturalization Service, Petitioner, v. George Fleuti
- Citations: 374 U.S. 449 (more) 83 S. Ct. 1804, 10 L.Ed.2d 1000
- Argument: Oral argument

Case history
- Prior: Fleuti v. Rosenberg, 302 F.2d 652 (CA9 1962)

Holding
- It would be inconsistent with the general ameliorative purpose of Congress in enacting §101(a)(13) to hold that an innocent, casual and brief excursion by a resident alien outside this country's borders was "intended" as a departure disruptive of his resident alien status so as to subject him to the consequences of an "entry" into the country on his return.

Court membership
- Chief Justice Earl Warren Associate Justices Hugo Black · William O. Douglas; Tom C. Clark · John M. Harlan II; William J. Brennan Jr. · Potter Stewart; Byron White · Arthur Goldberg

Case opinions
- Majority: Goldberg, joined by Warren, Black, Douglas, Brennan
- Dissent: Clark, joined by Harlan, Stewart, White

Rosenberg v. Fleuti, 374 U.S. 449 (1963), is a United States Supreme Court case concerning the interpretation of certain provisions of the Immigration and Nationality Act of 1952 (INA). The case was decided in 1963, with Justice Arthur Goldberg writing the majority opinion. The Court held that when respondent George Fleuti, a Swiss national who had lived in the United States as a permanent resident since 1952, had briefly traveled from the United States to Mexico and then returned, he had not engaged in an "entry" within the meaning of the INA. Accordingly, the Court concluded that Fleuti was ineligible for deportation "for a condition existing at that time but not at the time of his original admission before the 1952 Act became effective", which in Fleuti's case was homosexuality.
