= Miller v. Albright =

- Supreme Court of the United States

Argued November 4, 1997 Decided April 22, 1998
- Full case name: Lorelyn Penero Miller v. Madeleine K. Albright, Secretary of State
- Citations: 523 U.S. 420 (more) 118 S. Ct. 1428; 140 L. Ed. 2d 575

Case history
- Prior: Certiorari to the United States Court of Appeals for the District of Columbia Circuit; 96 F.3d 1467 (D.C. Cir. 1996)

Holding
- A law providing narrower standards for United States citizenship for a child born abroad out of wedlock to an American father, as opposed to an American mother, was justified by important government interests and did not violate the equal protection guarantee of the Fifth Amendment.

Court membership
- Chief Justice William Rehnquist Associate Justices John P. Stevens · Sandra Day O'Connor; Antonin Scalia · Anthony Kennedy; David Souter · Clarence Thomas; Ruth Bader Ginsburg · Stephen Breyer

Case opinions
- Plurality: Stevens, joined by Rehnquist
- Concurrence: O'Connor (in judgment), joined by Kennedy
- Concurrence: Scalia (in judgment), joined by Thomas
- Dissent: Ginsburg, joined by Souter, Breyer
- Dissent: Breyer, joined by Souter, Ginsburg

Laws applied
- U.S. Const. amend. V

Miller v. Albright, 523 U.S. 420 (1998), was a United States Supreme Court case in which the Court upheld the validity of laws relating to U.S. citizenship at birth for children born outside the United States, out of wedlock, to an American parent. The Court declined to overturn a more restrictive citizenship requirement applying to an illegitimate foreign-born child of an American father, as opposed to a child born to an American mother under similar circumstances.

== Details ==
Lorelyn Miller was born in the Philippines to an American father and a Philippine mother (who were not married). She later applied for a U.S. passport, but was turned down on the grounds that she was not a U.S. citizen. Miller challenged the law under which she had been denied citizenship, claiming that the law was unconstitutionally discriminatory because it imposed stricter requirements for a foreign-born illegitimate child of an American father than would have applied if her American parent had been her mother.

Six of the nine justices of the Supreme Court rejected Miller's challenge to the law, in three separate opinions that denied her citizenship claim for different reasons. Steven's opinion, stated that in considering nationality, men are not fathers, regardless of whether paternity is questionable, until "either the father or his child takes certain affirmative steps to create or confirm their relationship". His interpretation of existing law was that unmarried men were not fathers unless they chose to be, while a woman's biological tie to her child formed the legal basis of her relationship. Justices Ginsburg, Souter, and Breyer dissented, agreeing with Miller that the law in question was discriminatory, but concurred that it did not reach the threshold applicable for heightened scrutiny for gender discrimination. Ginsburg's dissent detailed the history of discrimination against women in the nationality law of the United States, including the inability to transmit nationality to children born abroad prior to 1934.

A subsequent case, Nguyen v. INS, 533 U.S. 53 (2001), held by a 5–4 majority that the law at issue in the Miller case facilitated government objectives by identifying biological parent-child relationships and ensuring that customary ties between the child and parent exist before nationality is granted.
