= Kawaauhau v. Geiger =

- Supreme Court of the United States

Argued January 21, 1998 Decided March 3, 1998
- Full case name: Margaret Kawaauhau, et vir, petitioners v. Paul W. Geiger
- Citations: 523 U.S. 57 (more) 118 S. Ct. 974; 140 L. Ed. 2d 90

Holding
- Debt arising from a medical malpractice judgment, attributable to negligent or reckless conduct is dischargeable under the Bankruptcy Code. Only intentional malpractice torts are not dischargeable.

Court membership
- Chief Justice William Rehnquist Associate Justices John P. Stevens · Sandra Day O'Connor; Antonin Scalia · Anthony Kennedy; David Souter · Clarence Thomas; Ruth Bader Ginsburg · Stephen Breyer

Case opinion
- Majority: Ginsburg, joined by unanimous

Laws applied
- Section 523(a)(6) of the Bankruptcy Code; 11 U.S.C. § 523(a)(6)

Kawaauhau v. Geiger, 523 U.S. 57 (1998), was a United States Supreme Court case in which the Court ruled that debt arising from a medical malpractice judgment, attributable to negligent or reckless conduct is dischargeable under the Bankruptcy Code.

== Background ==
Margaret Kawaauhau sought treatment from Dr. Paul Geiger for an injured foot, and he hospitalized her for fear of infection. Even though he knew intravenous penicillin would be more effective in warding off infection, he gave he oral penicillin instead, realizing she was trying to cut down on her medical costs. Afterwards, Dr. Geiger left Kawaauhau in the care of other physicians at the hospital he worked at while he went off on a business trip. The physicians decided she should be transferred to a specialist for infections. However, before that could be arranged, Dr. Geiger returned, and not only did he cancel such a transfer, he ended the antibiotics treatments, believing the infection had passed.

Over time, Kawaauhau's condition worsened and her leg had to be amputated below the knee. She and her husband sued Dr. Geiger for malpractice in federal district court, won, and were awarded $355,000 by the jury. Geiger had no malpractice insurance, and in an attempt to avoid paying the settlement, he moved to Missouri. His wages were then garnished by the Kawaauhaus, and Geiger subsequently filed for bankruptcy.

The Kawaauhaus asked the bankruptcy court to hold Geiger's settlement debts non-dischargeable, which it did. Dr. Geiger appealed to the Eighth Circuit Court, which overturned the bankruptcy court's decision, saying the Bankruptcy Code's discharge exception of debts caused through "willful and malicious injury by the debtor to another" did not apply in this case because the injury was unintentional. The Kawaauhaus appealed to the Supreme Court.

== Opinion of the Court ==
In a unanimous decision delivered by Justice Ginsburg, the Supreme Court ruled in favor of Dr. Geiger, saying unintentional malpractice torts were dischargeable by bankruptcy (that this instance did not fall under the exception provided for in §523(a)(6)), and thus upheld the decision of the Eighth Circuit Court.
