= Ohio Adult Parole Authority v. Woodard =

- Supreme Court of the United States

Decided March 25, 1998
- Full case name: Ohio Adult Parole Authority v. Woodard
- Citations: 523 U.S. 272 (more)

Holding
- Ohio's clemency procedure is constitutional because the minimum required by the Due Process Clause is notice and an opportunity to be heard.

Court membership
- Chief Justice William Rehnquist Associate Justices John P. Stevens · Sandra Day O'Connor; Antonin Scalia · Anthony Kennedy; David Souter · Clarence Thomas; Ruth Bader Ginsburg · Stephen Breyer

Case opinions
- Majority: Rehnquist (Parts I & III)
- Plurality: Rehnquist (Part II), joined by Scalia, Kennedy, Thomas
- Plurality: O'Connor (Part II), joined by Souter, Ginsburg, Breyer
- Dissent: Stevens

Laws applied
- Due Process Clause

Ohio Adult Parole Authority v. Woodard, 523 U.S. 272 (1998), was a United States Supreme Court case in which the court held that Ohio's clemency procedure is constitutional because the minimum required by the Due Process Clause is notice and an opportunity to be heard. The court also held that a clemency process that did not offer the petitioner immunity for anything said during interviews for the process did not violate self-incrimination principles.

== Background ==
After Eugene Woodard's Ohio murder conviction and death sentence were affirmed on direct appeal and the Supreme Court denied certiorari, the Ohio Adult Parole Authority commenced its clemency investigation in accordance with state law, informing respondent that he could have his voluntary interview with Authority members on a particular date, and that his clemency hearing would be held a week later.

Woodard sued under Section 1983, alleging that Ohio's clemency process violated his Fourteenth Amendment due process right and his Fifth Amendment right to remain silent.

The federal district court granted judgment on the pleadings to the State, and the Sixth Circuit Court of Appeals affirmed in part and reversed in part. Noting that Connecticut Board of Pardons v. Dumschat had decisively rejected the argument that federal law can create a liberty interest in clemency, the latter court held that Woodard had failed to establish a life or liberty interest protected by due process. The court also held, however, that respondent's "original" pretrial life and liberty interests were protected by a "second strand" of due process analysis under Evitts v. Lucey, although the amount of process due could be minimal because clemency, while an "integral part" of the adjudicatory system, is far removed from trial. The court remanded for the district court to decide what that process should be. Finally, the Sixth Circuit Court of Appeals concluded that Ohio's voluntary interview procedure presented respondent with a "Hobson's choice" between asserting his Fifth Amendment privilege against self-incrimination and participating in Ohio's clemency review process, thereby raising the specter of an unconstitutional condition.

== Opinion of the court ==
The Supreme Court issued an opinion on March 25, 1998.
