= Gray v. Maryland =

- Supreme Court of the United States

Decided March 9, 1998
- Full case name: Gray v. Maryland
- Citations: 523 U.S. 185 (more)

Holding
- The Bruton rule does not allow the admission of an out-of-court confession by a defendant to be entered against a jointly-tried co-defendant with the defendant's name redacted.

Court membership
- Chief Justice William Rehnquist Associate Justices John P. Stevens · Sandra Day O'Connor; Antonin Scalia · Anthony Kennedy; David Souter · Clarence Thomas; Ruth Bader Ginsburg · Stephen Breyer

Case opinions
- Majority: Breyer
- Dissent: Scalia, joined by Rehnquist, Kennedy, Thomas

Gray v. Maryland, 523 U.S. 185 (1998), was a United States Supreme Court case in which the court held that the Bruton rule does not allow the admission of an out-of-court confession by a defendant to be entered against a jointly-tried co-defendant with the defendant's name redacted.

== Background ==
Anthony Bell confessed to the police that he, petitioner Gray, and another man participated in the beating that caused Stacey Williams's death. After the third man died, a Maryland grand jury indicted Bell and Gray for murder, and the state tried them jointly. When the trial judge permitted the state to introduce a redacted version of Bell's confession, the detective who read it to the jury said "deleted" or "deletion" whenever the name of Gray or the third participant appeared. Immediately after that reading, however, the detective answered affirmatively when the prosecutor asked, "after [Bell] gave you that information, you subsequently were able to arrest ... Gray; is that correct?" The State also introduced a written copy of the confession with the two names omitted, leaving in their place blanks separated by commas. The judge instructed the jury that the confession could be used as evidence only against Bell, not Gray. The jury convicted both defendants. The Appellate Court of Maryland held that Bruton v. United States prohibited use of the confession and set aside Gray's conviction. The Maryland Supreme Court disagreed and reinstated that conviction.

== Opinion of the court ==
The Supreme Court issued an opinion on March 9, 1998.
