= Kiowa Tribe of Oklahoma v. Manufacturing Technologies, Inc. =

Kiowa Tribe v. Manufacturing Technologies
- Supreme Court of the United States

Argued January 12, 1998 Decided May 26, 1998
- Full case name: Kiowa Tribe of Oklahoma v. Manufacturing Technologies, Inc.
- Citations: 523 U.S. 751 (more) 118 S. Ct. 1700; 140 L. Ed. 2d 981; 1998 U.S. LEXIS 3406

Case history
- Prior: Okla. Court of Civil Appeals, First Division (not reported)

Holding
- A Native nation is entitled to sovereign immunity from contract lawsuits, whether made on or off reservation, or involving governmental or commercial activities.

Court membership
- Chief Justice William Rehnquist Associate Justices John P. Stevens · Sandra Day O'Connor; Antonin Scalia · Anthony Kennedy; David Souter · Clarence Thomas; Ruth Bader Ginsburg · Stephen Breyer

Case opinions
- Majority: Kennedy, joined by Rehnquist, O'Connor, Scalia, Souter and Breyer
- Dissent: Stevens, joined by Thomas and Ginsburg

Laws applied
- Tribal Sovereignty, Tribal Immunity

Kiowa Tribe v. Manufacturing Technologies, 523 U.S. 751 (1998), was a case in which the Supreme Court of the United States held that a Native Nation is entitled to sovereign immunity from contract lawsuits, whether made on or off reservation, or involving governmental or commercial activities.

== Background ==
The Kiowa Tribe of Oklahoma entered into an agreement in 1990 to pay $285,000 for stock. The agreement indicates that it was signed on tribal land, but Manufacturing Technologies stated that it was executed in Oklahoma City on non-tribal land. The tribe defaulted and Manufacturing Technologies sued in state court. The trial court denied the tribe's motion for summary judgment based on tribal sovereignty. The tribe then appealed to the Oklahoma Court of Civil Appeals which affirmed the trial court's decision. The Oklahoma Supreme Court denied the tribe's request of review. The U.S. Supreme Court then granted certiorari to hear the case.

== Opinion of the Court ==
Reversed. Justice Anthony Kennedy delivered the opinion of the court.

Justice Kennedy noted that the contract stated that "Nothing in this Note subjects or limits the sovereign rights of the Kiowa Tribe of Oklahoma." He then noted that unless Congress provides for the abrogation of tribal sovereignty or the tribe waives its immunity, a tribe is not subject to answering a suit in state courts. The tribe is immune, regardless of whether the matter involves governmental or commercial activities, and regardless of whether the activity occurs on or off of tribal property.

=== Dissent ===
Justice John P. Stevens dissented, stating that a state should have the authority to regulate the conduct of tribes that occur off of tribal lands.

== Subsequent developments ==
Subsequent cases have further defined the concept of tribal immunity. C & L Enterprises, Inc. v. Citizen Band Potawatomi Tribe of Okla. noted that while a tribe has immunity, it may waive that immunity by agreeing to an arbitration clause in a contract that the tribe itself provided.
