= List of United States Supreme Court cases, volume 523 =

This is a list of all United States Supreme Court cases from volume 523 of the United States Reports:

Case name	Citation	Date decided
Spencer v. Kemna	523 U.S. 1	1998
When an incarcerated person files a habeas petition but is released before the petition can be heard on the merits, the petition is moot.
Lexecon Inc. v. Milberg Weiss Bershad Hynes & Lerach	523 U.S. 26	March 3, 1998
Bogan v. Scott-Harris	523 U.S. 44	1998
Kawaauhau v. Geiger	523 U.S. 57	1998
United States v. Ramirez	523 U.S. 65	1998
Oncale v. Sundowner Offshore Services, Inc.	523 U.S. 75	1998
Steel Co. v. Citizens for Better Environment	523 U.S. 83	1998
Quality King Distributors, Inc. v. L'anza Research Int'l, Inc.	523 U.S. 135	1998
Lewis v. United States	523 U.S. 155	1998
Gray v. Maryland	523 U.S. 185	1998
Glendora v. Porzio	523 U.S. 206	1998
Hetzel v. Prince William County	523 U.S. 208	1998
Cohen v. de la Cruz	523 U.S. 213	1998
Because 11 U.S.C. § 523(a)(2)(A) excepts from discharge all liability arising from fraud, treble damages (plus attorney's fees and costs) awarded on account of the debtor's fraud fall within the scope of the exception.
Almendarez-Torres v. United States	523 U.S. 224	1998
Ohio Adult Parole Authority v. Woodard	523 U.S. 272	1998
Texas v. United States	523 U.S. 296	1998
United States v. Scheffer	523 U.S. 303	1998
Feltner v. Columbia Pictures Television, Inc.	523 U.S. 340	1998
United States v. United States Shoe Corp.	523 U.S. 360	1998
Breard v. Greene	523 U.S. 371	1998
Atlantic Mut. Ins. Co. v. Commissioner	523 U.S. 382	1998
Campbell v. Louisiana	523 U.S. 392	1998
Beach v. Ocwen Fed. Bank	523 U.S. 410	1998
Miller v. Albright	523 U.S. 420	1998
California v. Deep Sea Research, Inc.	523 U.S. 491	1998
Edwards v. United States	523 U.S. 511	1998
United States v. Estate of Romani	523 U.S. 517	1998
Calderon v. Thompson	523 U.S. 538	1998
Crawford-El v. Britton	523 U.S. 574	1998
Ricci v. Arlington Heights	523 U.S. 613	1998
Dismissed as improvidently granted.
Bousley v. United States	523 U.S. 614	1998
Stewart v. Martinez-Villareal	523 U.S. 637	1998
Textron Lycoming Reciprocating Engine Div., AVCO Corp. v. Automobile Workers	523 U.S. 653	1998
Arkansas Ed. Television Comm'n v. Forbes	523 U.S. 666	1998
Montana v. Crow Tribe	523 U.S. 696	1998
Ohio Forestry Assn., Inc. v. Sierra Club	523 U.S. 726	1998
Calderon v. Ashmus	523 U.S. 740	1998
Kiowa Tribe of Okla. v. Manufacturing Technologies, Inc.	523 U.S. 751	1998
New Jersey v. New York	523 U.S. 767	1998
County of Sacramento v. Lewis	523 U.S. 833	1998
Air Line Pilots v. Miller	523 U.S. 866	1998
When a union adopts an arbitration process to comply with Hudson's "impartial decisionmaker" requirement, agency-fee objectors who have not agreed to the procedure may not be required to exhaust the arbitral remedy before challenging the union's calculation in a federal court action.
