= Marvin Guy =

American convict (born 1964)

- Born: Marvin Louis Guy; October 27, 1964 (age 61)
- Status: Incarcerated
- Known for: Controversial conviction
- Conviction: Murder
- Penalty: Life imprisonment (minimum of 30 years)

Marvin Louis Guy (born October 27, 1964) is an American man who was convicted of murder in the death of Bell County, Texas police officer Charles Dinwiddie. In 2014, Dinwiddie died after a no-knock raid had been executed on Guy's house after gunfire erupted, including Guy shooting, stating that he believed the policemen were intruders.

Guy was charged with capital murder in the death of Charles Dinwiddie. Nine years later, his case went to trial and a jury found him guilty on the lesser offense of non-capital murder. Guy's case became notable due to debate over the extent of the castle doctrine, whether Guy's actions were self-defense, and whether Guy was truly the one who shot Dinwiddie.

== Raid and death of Charles Dinwiddie ==
Police stated that they believed Guy was in possession of cocaine and asked a judge to sign a no-knock warrant to search his apartment. The warrant stated, "The informant has reported that Guy is frequently armed with a handgun." In 2014, Killeen, Texas police used a no-knock warrant to conduct a drug raid of Guy’s apartment. Around 5:45 a.m. on May 9, 2014, a SWAT team ignited a flash-bang grenade, broke Guy's bedroom window and used a battering ram on his front door. Gunfire erupted, including Guy shooting, stating that he believed the officers were intruders, and four Killeen police officers were wounded. Detective Charles "Chuck" Dinwiddie died of his injuries two days later on May 11, 2014. Whether Guy or police shot Dinwiddie was disputed. Dinwiddie was the SWAT team leader and had directed the raid on Guy’s apartment. The search turned up an "orange glass pipe," but no drugs.

Killeen police banned no-knock warrants in drug cases in 2022.

== Legal proceedings ==
The district attorney charged Marvin Guy with capital murder in Dinwiddie's death and attempted capital murder for wounding of three other officers. At the time of the incident, Bell County prosecutors sought the death penalty for Guy.

The Washington Post reported that Guy claims he is innocent and he said police accidentally shot detective Dinwiddie, not him.

In September 2022, four months after The Washington Post’s "Broken Doors" podcast about Marvin Guy's case, prosecutors reversed course and dropped their pursuit of the death penalty. Guy believed The Washington Post’s podcast, plus pressure from local politicians and others, led to the death penalty being taken off the table.

=== Delays ===
Guy had been in prison since 2014 awaiting trial. By December 2021, his case became the longest unresolved capital murder case in Bell County's history.

His trial had been repeatedly delayed due to several factors, including Guy's health, COVID-19, and defense attorneys claiming the DA's office had not released all the evidence. A succession of defense attorneys and many legal motions also contributed to delays. Several defense lawyers were fired or quit. Marvin Guy had two defense attorneys, Michael White and Russell Hunt, before Carlos Garcia took the role in September 2015. In 2021, Guy's family was in the process of hiring another attorney.

In 2019, Guy sought a medical continuance because he needed back surgery for a degenerative condition. In 2021, COVID-19 precautions delayed all jury trials in Bell County's district courts.

In December 2021, Guy's defense attorneys debated over evidence and trial dates with Assistant District Attorney Fred Burns and Judge John Gauntt. Joseph Caleb, the defense attorney, requested Marvin Guy's jail phone calls and the medical examiner's file. Defense attorney Mike Ware argued, "We don't have the entire medical examiner's file, including photos." Judge Gauntt ordered that the medical examiner's file, including photos be produced.

By the end of 2021, trial dates had been set and reset multiple times. The state sought a trial date in April 2023. Assistant District Attorney Fred Burns, the prosecutor, made a motion asking for a visiting judge to try the case, arguing that there were dozens of cases set for a jury trial in the 27th Judicial District Court. Judge John Gauntt denied the motion and the trial date was set for October 30, 2023.

=== Trial ===
Marvin Guy's case went to trial November 4, 2023. The jury acquitted him of capital murder, but found him guilty on the lesser offense of murder. On the day of the verdict, about twenty current and former Killeen police officers were at the county courthouse waiting for a verdict. Also present were Guy’s brother and members of the Elmer Geronimo Pratt Gun Club of Central Texas, which has supported Guy.

== Controversy ==
Marvin Guy's case garnered national attention when it was covered by Mother Jones magazine, which compared it to a remarkably similar no-knock raid. Five months earlier, 100 miles away, a SWAT officer was shot during a no-knock raid on another house. In that case, police also threw a flash-bang grenade and tried to enter a residence in the predawn hours. The resident, Henry "Hank" Magee, fired his semi-automatic .308 rifle killing one of the officers.

Mother Jones pointed out differences in the cases. Magee is white and Marvin Guy is black. Magee was found to have acted in self-defense and Guy was charged with capital murder. Both Guy and Magee had prior records. However, only Magee was found with drugs.

Bell County community activists have held protests and demanded justice for Marvin Guy. In October 2020, protesters, including members of a central Texas gun club, said Marvin Guy had a right to protect his home and objected to his years-long wait for a trial. The following January members of the Elmer Geronimo Pratt Pistol and Rifle Club held an event in Killeen. They gathered for a community patrol and circulated petitions including one seeking justice for Marvin Guy.
