= Calderon v. Ashmus =

- Supreme Court of the United States

Decided May 26, 1998
- Full case name: Calderon v. Ashmus
- Citations: 523 U.S. 740 (more)

Holding
- The Declaratory Judgment Act cannot be used to seek an advance ruling on a collateral issue.

Court membership
- Chief Justice William Rehnquist Associate Justices John P. Stevens · Sandra Day O'Connor; Antonin Scalia · Anthony Kennedy; David Souter · Clarence Thomas; Ruth Bader Ginsburg · Stephen Breyer

Case opinions
- Majority: Rehnquist, joined by unanimous
- Concurrence: Breyer, joined by Souter

Laws applied
- Declaratory Judgment Act

Calderon v. Ashmus, 523 U.S. 740 (1998), was a United States Supreme Court case in which the court held that the Declaratory Judgment Act cannot be used to seek an advance ruling on a collateral issue. Therefore, the question posed by this case was nonjusticiable under Article III.

== Background ==
Chapter 154 of Title 28 of the United States Code, part of the Antiterrorism and Effective Death Penalty Act of 1996, provides, among other things, an expedited review process including a 180-day filing period for federal habeas corpus proceedings in capital cases in states that meet certain conditions. Proceedings against other States are governed by Chapter 153, which has a 1-year filing period and lacks expedited procedures.

After California officials, including the state attorney general Dan Lungren, indicated that they would invoke Chapter 154's protections, Troy Ashmus, an incarcerated person on death row, sought declaratory and injunctive relief to resolve whether the chapter applied to a class of incarcerated people sentenced to death whose convictions were affirmed after a particular date. The federal district court issued a declaratory judgment, holding that California did not qualify for Chapter 154 and therefore the chapter did not apply to the class. The district court enjoined the California officials from invoking the chapter in any proceedings involving class members.

In affirming, the Ninth Circuit Court of Appeals rejected the officials' claim that the Eleventh Amendment barred Ashmus's suit; determined that the district court had authority to issue a declaratory judgment under the federal Declaratory Judgment Act; and rejected the officials' contention that the injunction violated the First Amendment.

== Opinion of the court ==
The Supreme Court issued an opinion on May 26, 1998. The Supreme Court determined that, before reaching the Eleventh and First Amendment issues on which certiorari was granted, the court needed to address whether the action was the type of Article III case or controversy that may be considered by federal courts. The court decided that it was not.

In the end the Supreme Court decided in a unanimous decision in favor of Calderon.
