= Bogan v. Scott-Harris =

- Supreme Court of the United States

Argued December 3, 1997 Decided March 3, 1998
- Full case name: Daniel Bogan et al. v. Janet Scott-Harris
- Docket no.: 96-1569
- Citations: 523 U.S. 44 (more)
- Argument: Oral argument

Case history
- Prior: United States Court of Appeals for the First Circuit

Questions presented
- Are actions by local officials introducing, voting for, and signing an ordinance outside the scope of legislative activities because of the motives of the government actors?

Holding
- Local legislators are entitled to the same absolute immunity from civil liability under Section 1983 for their legislative activities as are federal, state and regional legislators regardless of motive or intent.

Court membership
- Chief Justice William Rehnquist Associate Justices John P. Stevens · Sandra Day O'Connor; Antonin Scalia · Anthony Kennedy; David Souter · Clarence Thomas; Ruth Bader Ginsburg · Stephen Breyer

Case opinion
- Majority: Thomas, joined by unanimous

Laws applied
- US Const. amend. I; 42 U.S.C. § 1983

Bogan v. Scott-Harris, 523 U.S. 44 (1997), is a ruling by the Supreme Court of the United States where the court decided unanimously local legislators are entitled to the same absolute immunity from civil liability under Section 1983 for their legislative activities as are federal, state and regional legislators regardless of motive or intent.

== Background ==
From 1981 to 1997, respondent Janet Scott-Harris was the administrator for the Department of Health and Human Services (DHHS) in Fall River, Massachusetts. In 1990, Scott-Harris received a complaint that Dorothy Blitcliffe, a DHHS employee supervised by Scott-Harris, had made repeated racial and ethnic slurs about her colleagues. As Scott-Harris prepared to terminate Blitcliffe's employment, Blitcliffe used her political connections to press her case with state and local officials. One such connection was with petitioner Marilyn Roderick, the vice president of the Fall River City Council. The city council held a hearing on the pending charges against Blitcliffe. It ultimately accepted a settlement that would require Blitcliffe to be suspended for sixty days without pay. Afterwards, petitioner Daniel Bogan, the mayor of Fall River, substantially reduced the punishment.

Meanwhile, Bogan prepared a budget proposal for the 1992 fiscal year. In anticipation of a 5 to 10 percent reduction in state aid, he proposed a freeze on the salaries of municipal employees, as well as the elimination of 135 city positions. Additionally, Bogan proposed the elimination of DHHS, of which Scott-Harris was the sole employee. The council's ordinance committee, chaired by Roderick, approved the proposal, eliminating DHHS. The proposal was approved by the city council in a 6–2 vote, with Roderick voting in favor. Bogan would go on to sign the ordinance into law.

Scott-Harris filed a lawsuit under 42 U.S.C. § 1983 against Bogan, Roderick, and others. In her lawsuit, Scott-Harris alleged that the elimination of her position was motivated by racial animus and her exercising her First Amendment right by moving to terminate Blitcliffe's employment. In the United States District Court for the District of Massachusetts, a jury found in favor of the defendants on the racial discrimination charge, but ruled in favor of Scott-Harris on her First Amendment claim. The United States Court of Appeals for the First Circuit affirmed the judgment against the city.

== Supreme Court Opinion ==
Justice Thomas delivered the opinion for a unanimous court.

=== Thomas's Opinion ===
Thomas begins his opinion with a summary of the common law principle that legislators are absolutely immune from liability for their legislative acts. Having held that state and regional legislators are entitled to absolute immunity from §1983 litigation, that the common law provided immunity to local legislators, and that the rationale for the latter is the same as for the former, Thomas logically concludes that the court should extend §1983 immunity to municipal lawmakers as well.

Having held that local legislators are entitled to §1983 immunity for their legislative acts, Thomas then goes on to demonstrate that the city's acts at issue were in fact legislative, rather than retaliatory. Whether an act is legislative, Thomas says, depends on the nature of the act, rather the intent for which it is proposed. Quoting Tenney v. Brandhove, he says:

The privilege of absolute immunity "would be of little value if [legislators] could be subjected to the cost and inconvenience and distractions of a trial upon a conclusion of the pleader, or to the hazard of a judgment against them based upon a jury's speculation as to motives."

Having dispensed with the need to consider the motive behind the acts at issue, Thomas settles on the view that the actions taken by the city were clearly legislative. The acts of drafting, voting for, and signing policy are the hallmarks, Thomas says, of legislative acts, and should thus legislators should be granted absolute immunity from prosecution in such legislative acts.
