= Richards v. Wisconsin =

- Supreme Court of the United States

Argued March 24, 1997 Decided April 28, 1997
- Full case name: Steiney Richards v. State of Wisconsin
- Citations: 520 U.S. 385 (more) 117 S.Ct. 1416

Case history
- Prior: 201 Wis. 2d 845, 549 N. W. 2d 218 (Wisconsin Supreme Court 1996) (upheld)

Holding
- There is no blanket exception to the knock-and-announce rule for felony drug investigations, but this specific search of Richards' motel room was justified based on the facts.

Court membership
- Chief Justice William Rehnquist Associate Justices John P. Stevens · Sandra Day O'Connor; Antonin Scalia · Anthony Kennedy; David Souter · Clarence Thomas; Ruth Bader Ginsburg · Stephen Breyer

Case opinion
- Majority: Stevens, joined by unanimous

Laws applied
- U.S. Const. amend. IV

Richards v. Wisconsin, 529 U.S. 385 (1997), was a case before the United States Supreme Court in which the Court held that the Fourth Amendment does not allow a blanket exception to the knock-and-announce rule for investigations of drug-related felonies.

== Background ==
After an extensive investigation of a suspected drug ring that conducted dealings from motel rooms, officers from the Madison, Wisconsin police department applied for a search warrant to raid Steiney Richards' motel room on December 31, 1991. Although the officers' draft contained a portion that would authorize a "no-knock" approach, the magistrate omitted that excerpt from the final draft.

Disguised as a repairman at 3:40 AM, Officer Pharo led the raid team that consisted of one uniformed officer and several plainclothes officers. When he knocked on the door, Richards asked who was there. Pharo responded that he was a maintenance worker. Richards then slightly opened the room's entrance, with the chain still attached; once he spotted a uniformed officer behind Pharo, he swiftly slammed the door shut. The officers testified that they began kicking the door and identifying themselves as police.

Getting inside, the officers prevented Richards from escaping through a window. Searching the room, plastic bags containing cocaine and cash were found hidden in the bathroom's ceiling tiles.

=== Lower courts ===
At trial, Richards filed a motion to suppress the evidence on the basis that the police did not properly knock and announce. Citing the "easily disposable nature" of drugs and Richards' behavior, the judge denied the motion. The Wisconsin Supreme Court affirmed the decision on the basis that Wilson v. Arkansas did not prevent per se exceptions to the rule. Drawing from third-party sources such as newspapers and surveys, as well as judicial opinions, the Wisconsin Supreme Court further opined that felony drug crimes all have an inherent danger to police lives and effective investigations.

== Opinion of the Court ==
With an opinion delivered by Justice John Paul Stevens, the Supreme Court unanimously upheld the Wisconsin Supreme Court's decision while challenging their reasoning. The Court declared that the generalized assertion that all felony drug crimes are dangerous would open a Pandora's Box that would lead to other exceptions for "dangerous crimes." Therefore, the spirit of the knock-and-announce rule would be destroyed. Although the Court upheld the search of Richards' motel room and considered the magistrate's final draft irrelevant to the facts, that matter was based on the officers' reasonable inferences stemming from the observations during the raid. In other scenarios involving felony drug crimes, a no-knock raid might be considered unreasonable depending on a court's interpretation of the facts. Overall, while no-knock warrants are justified to apprehend a suspected dangerous criminal and to prevent the destruction of evidence, they must revolve around reasonable suspicion gathered from specific facts in each instance.
