= County of Sacramento v. Lewis =

- Supreme Court of the United States

Argued December 9, 1997 Decided May 26, 1998
- Full case name: County of Sacramento v. Lewis, et al. v. Teri Lewis and Thomas Lewis, personal representative of the Estate of Philip Lewis, deceased
- Citations: 523 U.S. 833 (more) 118 S. Ct. 1708; 140 L. Ed. 2d 1043

Case history
- Prior: Lewis v. County of Sacramento, 98 F.3d 434 (9th Cir. 1996); cert. granted, 520 U.S. 1250 (1997).

Holding
- High-speed chases with no intent to harm suspects physically or to worsen their legal plight do not give rise to liability under the Fourteenth Amendment.

Court membership
- Chief Justice William Rehnquist Associate Justices John P. Stevens · Sandra Day O'Connor; Antonin Scalia · Anthony Kennedy; David Souter · Clarence Thomas; Ruth Bader Ginsburg · Stephen Breyer

Case opinions
- Majority: Souter, joined by Rehnquist, O'Connor, Kennedy, Ginsburg, Breyer
- Concurrence: Rehnquist
- Concurrence: Kennedy, joined by O'Connor
- Concurrence: Breyer
- Concurrence: Stevens (in the judgment of the court only)
- Concurrence: Scalia, joined by Thomas (in the judgment of the court only)

Laws applied
- U.S. Const. amend. XIV

Sacramento v. Lewis, 523 U.S. 833 (1998), was a decision of the Supreme Court of the United States involving police action in a high-speed car chase.

== Background ==
This case concerned a high-speed chase between Sacramento County sheriff's deputies and two men on a motorcycle: Brian Willard driving and Phillip Lewis as a passenger. The chase wove in and out of moving traffic and reached speeds up to 100 miles an hour, ending when Willard lost control and the bike tipped over. One of the deputies could not stop in time and hit Lewis, killing him. Lewis' parents sued the county's Sheriff's Department, accusing the deputy of depriving Lewis of his Fourteenth Amendment due process right to life through deliberate and reckless conduct. A district court ruled in favor of the deputy, the Ninth Circuit appeals court reversed, and then the Supreme Court ruled unanimously in the department's favor.

== Decision ==
The question before the Court was: Does a police officer violate substantive due process by causing death through reckless indifference to life in a high-speed chase aimed at apprehending a suspected offender? The answer was a unanimous "no."

The majority opinion based this on an analysis of the 14th Amendment due process concept and an application of the "shocks the conscience" test. Prior cases have held that the "core" of due process concept is "protection of the individual against arbitrary action of government." In dealing with executive action, only the "most egregious" conduct is "arbitrary in constitutional sense."

In determining what is "egregious" action, one should consider whether such action "shocks the conscience" (Rochin v. California, 1953). One must also consider culpability: in this case, we are dealing with "recklessness." Finally, the decision should not be made "mechanically" for one should consider the context.

In this case, the "deliberate indifference" accusation does not make sense, since in a high-speed chase there is no time for deliberation. Furthermore, one must remember that officers are under intense pressure in these situations, where they must "act decisively and show restraint at the same time." Thus the Court held: "High-speed chases with no intent to harm suspects physically or to worsen their legal plight do not give rise to liability under the Fourteenth Amendment"

In Kennedy's concurrence, he warned that the "shock the conscience" test should be treated with skepticism due to its subjective nature. However, he recognized it as a good starting point for comparing the "objective nature" of certain actions with precedent, history, and tradition. When considering the test, one need to take into the account the "necessities" of law enforcement: It would be counterproductive to suggest that "suspects may ignore a lawful command to stop and then sue for damages sustained in an ensuing chase"

Scalia's concurrence noted the irony in applying the "shocks the conscience" test in this case, since only last term the Court rejected it (Washington v. Glucksberg, 1997). He agreed with the Court, not because of the "shocks the conscience" test, but because the petitioners had presented no support for their "alleged due process right."

== See also ==
- List of United States Supreme Court cases, volume 523
- List of United States Supreme Court cases
- Lists of United States Supreme Court cases by volume
