= Feltner v. Columbia Pictures Television, Inc. =

- Supreme Court of the United States

Argued January 21, 1998 Decided March 31, 1998
- Full case name: C. Elvin Feltner, Jr., Petitioner v. Columbia Pictures Television, Incorporated
- Citations: 523 U.S. 340 (more) 118 S. Ct. 1279; 140 L. Ed. 2d 438; 1998 U.S. LEXIS 2301; 66 U.S.L.W. 4245; 46 U.S.P.Q.2d (BNA) 1161; Copy. L. Rep. (CCH) ¶ 27,752; 163 A.L.R. Fed. 721; 26 Media L. Rep. 1513; 98 Cal. Daily Op. Service 2324; 98 Daily Journal DAR 3175; 1998 Colo. J. C.A.R. 1542; 11 Fla. L. Weekly Fed. S 417

Case history
- Prior: Columbia Pictures Television, Inc. v. Krypton Broad. of Birmingham, Inc., 106 F.3d 284 (9th Cir. 1997); cert. granted, 521 U.S. 1151 (1997).
- Subsequent: Remanded, Columbia Pictures Industries, Inc. vs. Krypton Broadcasting of Birmingham, Inc., 152 F.3d 1171 (9th Cir. 1998).

Holding
- There is no statutory right to a jury trial under the Copyright Act, but the Seventh Amendment requires jury trials as the standard practice in copyright cases; therefore, an order denying a jury trial on damages violates the Seventh Amendment.

Court membership
- Chief Justice William Rehnquist Associate Justices John P. Stevens · Sandra Day O'Connor; Antonin Scalia · Anthony Kennedy; David Souter · Clarence Thomas; Ruth Bader Ginsburg · Stephen Breyer

Case opinions
- Majority: Thomas, joined by Rehnquist, Stevens, O'Connor, Kennedy, Souter, Ginsburg, Breyer
- Concurrence: Scalia

Laws applied
- U.S. Const. amend. VII, Copyright Act § 504(c)

Feltner v. Columbia Pictures Television, Inc., 523 U.S. 340 (1998), was a case in which the Supreme Court of the United States ruled that if there is to be an award of statutory damages in a copyright infringement case, then the opposing party has the right to demand a jury trial.

== Background ==
C. Elvin Feltner, Jr., and the corporation he owns, Krypton International Corporation, operate 3 television stations which ran various television shows licensed from Columbia Pictures, including Who's the Boss?, Silver Spoons, Hart to Hart, and T. J. Hooker. After becoming delinquent in royalty payments, and being unable to resolve the impasse over the debt owed, Columbia revoked their license to run the shows. The stations kept running them anyway. Columbia sued Feltner, Krypton and some subsidiaries and executives of the corporation for copyright infringement. The trial court found the infringement to be wilful, and denied Feltner's request for a jury trial on statutory damages. The court found every broadcast of every episode run on every television station to be a separate infringement, awarded $20,000 for each of the 440 acts, for a total of $8,800,000 in damages.

The Court of Appeals for the Ninth Circuit upheld the award. The Ninth Circuit was one of the few Circuits that did not require a jury trial.

== Opinion ==
The Supreme Court examined the statute in an attempt to resolve the issue without reaching constitutional issues. It found that there is no provision in the statute for a jury trial on the issue of statutory damages, therefore it must look at whether the law triggers the provisions of the requirement for trial by jury required by the Seventh Amendment. The question then is, were statutory damages in the form of a trial in a court of law, or a trial in a court of equity; if a court of law, then trial by jury may be demanded; if a court of equity, then trial by jury is not available unless provided for by statute. Upon examining long historical practice in copyright infringement cases, it decided that damages in a copyright case have historically been tried as a court of law, and not as a court of equity. Thus, the defendant Feltner was entitled to a jury trial on the issue of the amount of statutory damages. Feltner was represented by now Chief Justice John Roberts.

The judgment was reversed and remanded back to the trial court.

After remand and the jury trial ordered by the Supreme Court, the jury awarded $72,000 in statutory damages for each of the 440 works infringed, for a total award of $31.68 million – over three and a half times the damages awarded by the Judge at the prior bench trial. On his appeal from the $31.68 million jury award to the Ninth Circuit, Feltner argued that the Supreme Court's rulings (that the Copyright Act provided that statutory damages are awarded by Judges and the Seventh Amendment required that juries award those damaged) rendered statutory damages unconstitutional and void. The Ninth Circuit rejected this argument and affirmed the $31.68 million jury award. Feltner's petition to the Supreme Court to hear the case for a second time was unsuccessful, leaving the $31.68 million award intact.

== See also ==
- List of United States Supreme Court cases, volume 523
- List of United States Supreme Court cases
- Lists of United States Supreme Court cases by volume
