= List of United States Supreme Court cases, volume 374 =

This is a list of the United States Supreme Court cases from volume 374 of the United States Reports:

Case name	Citation	Date decided
Shenker v. Baltimore & Ohio R.R. Co.	374 U.S. 1	1963
Fitzgerald v. United States Lines Co.	374 U.S. 16	1963
Ker v. California	374 U.S. 23	1963
Braunstein v. Commissioner	374 U.S. 65	1963
Motor Coach Employees v. Missouri	374 U.S. 74	1963
United States v. Pioneer American Insurance Co.	374 U.S. 84	1963
Baldwin v. Moss	374 U.S. 93	1963
Allen v. Virginia	374 U.S. 93	1963
W.R. Arthur & Co. v. Wisconsin Dept. of Taxation	374 U.S. 94	1963
Lublin v. James T. Barnes & Co.	374 U.S. 94	1963
Sloan's Moving & Storage Co. v. United States	374 U.S. 95	1963
Scott v. Pennsylvania	374 U.S. 95	1963
Briggs v. Louisiana State Bar Association	374 U.S. 96	1963
Bollettieri v. New York	374 U.S. 96	1963
Randolph v. Virginia	374 U.S. 97	1963
Henry v. Virginia	374 U.S. 98	1963
Thompson v. Virginia	374 U.S. 99	1963
Wood v. Virginia	374 U.S. 100	1963
Marchese v. United States	374 U.S. 101	1963
Keller v. Wisconsin ex rel. State Bar of Wisconsin	374 U.S. 102	1963
Price v. Moss	374 U.S. 103	1963
Laino v. New York	374 U.S. 104	1963
Huggins v. Raines	374 U.S. 105	1963
Bentley v. Alaska I	374 U.S. 106	1963
Bentley v. Alaska II	374 U.S. 107	1963
Peterson v. Wainwright	374 U.S. 108	1963
Yellin v. United States	374 U.S. 109	1963
United States v. Muniz	374 U.S. 150	1963
Moseley v. Electronic & Missile Facilities, Inc.	374 U.S. 167	1963
United States v. Singer Manufacturing Co.	374 U.S. 174	1963
School District of Abington Township v. Schempp	374 U.S. 203	1963
United States v. Philadelphia National Bank	374 U.S. 321	1963
Sherbert v. Verner	374 U.S. 398	1963
Head v. Board of Examiners	374 U.S. 424	1963
Rosenberg v. Fleuti	374 U.S. 449	1963
Gastelum-Quinones v. Kennedy	374 U.S. 469	1963
Chamberlin v. Board of Public Instruction	374 U.S. 487	1963
Jamieson v. Celebrezze	374 U.S. 487	1963
Robinson v. Hunter	374 U.S. 488	1963
Walker v. Walker	374 U.S. 488	1963
Davis v. Banmiller	374 U.S. 489	1963
Laughner v. Wainwright	374 U.S. 489	1963
Mays v. California	374 U.S. 490	1963
Bradley v. Iowa	374 U.S. 490	1963
Paige v. North Carolina	374 U.S. 491	1963
Acuff v. Texas	374 U.S. 491	1963
Bryant v. Wainwright	374 U.S. 492	1963
Kovner v. Wainwright	374 U.S. 492	1963
Chavez v. California	374 U.S. 493	1963
Traub v. Connecticut	374 U.S. 493	1963
Auflick v. Wainwright	374 U.S. 494	1963
Sidener v. California	374 U.S. 494	1963
Davis v. Soja	374 U.S. 495	1963
Cardinal Sporting Goods Co. v. Eagleton	374 U.S. 496	1963
Regalado v. California	374 U.S. 497	1963
Dearhart v. Virginia	374 U.S. 498	1963
Harris v. California	374 U.S. 499	1963
Daniels v. Virginia	374 U.S. 500	1963
Jones v. California	374 U.S. 501	1963
Scott v. United States	374 U.S. 502	1963
Bone v. United States	374 U.S. 503	1963
Dearhart v. Virginia	374 U.S. 504	1963
Herb v. Wainwright	374 U.S. 505	1963
Holmes v. Wainwright	374 U.S. 506	1963
Palmer v. Wainwright	374 U.S. 507	1963
Baxley v. Wainwright	374 U.S. 508	1963
Head v. California	374 U.S. 509	1963
