= Hudson v. Michigan =

- Supreme Court of the United States

Argued January 9, 2006 Reargued May 18, 2006 Decided June 15, 2006
- Full case name: Booker T. Hudson, Jr. v. Michigan
- Docket no.: 04-1360
- Citations: 547 U.S. 586 (more) 126 S. Ct. 2159; 165 L. Ed. 2d 56; 2006 U.S. LEXIS 4677

Case history
- Prior: Motion to suppress granted, Wayne County Circuit Court; reversed, Mich. App. May 1, 2001; leave to appeal denied, 639 N.W.2d 255 (Mich. 2001); defendant convicted, Wayne County Circuit Court; affirmed, Mich. App. June 17, 2004; leave to appeal denied, 692 N.W.2d 385 (Mich. 2005); cert. granted, 545 U.S. 1138 (2005); restored to calendar for reargument, 547 U.S. 1096 (2006).

Holding
- A violation of the "knock-and-announce" rule by police does not require the suppression of the evidence found during a search.

Court membership
- Chief Justice John Roberts Associate Justices John P. Stevens · Antonin Scalia; Anthony Kennedy · David Souter; Clarence Thomas · Ruth Bader Ginsburg; Stephen Breyer · Samuel Alito

Case opinions
- Majority: Scalia, joined by Roberts, Thomas, Alito; Kennedy (Parts I, II, and III)
- Concurrence: Kennedy (in part)
- Dissent: Breyer, joined by Stevens, Souter, Ginsburg

Laws applied
- U.S. Const. amend. IV

Hudson v. Michigan, 547 U.S. 586 (2006), is a United States Supreme Court case in which the Court held that a violation of the Fourth Amendment requirement that police officers knock, announce their presence, and wait a reasonable amount of time before entering a private residence (the knock-and-announce requirement) does not require suppression of the evidence obtained in the ensuing search.

== Background ==
On the afternoon of August 27, 1998, Officer Jamal Good and six other Detroit police officers arrived at the residence of Booker T. Hudson to execute a warrant authorizing a search of Hudson's home for drugs and firearms. Several officers shouted "police, search warrant," but then, as was Officer Good's policy in drug cases, they waited only "three to five seconds" before entering Hudson's home through the unlocked front door.

Immediately upon entering, the officers found Hudson sitting on a chair in the living room while numerous other individuals were running about the house. In the ensuing search, the police found five rocks of crack cocaine weighing less than 25 grams (7/8 oz) inside Hudson's pants pockets. In addition, a plastic bag containing 23 individual baggies of crack and a loaded revolver were found on the chair upon which Hudson was sitting, and a plastic bag containing 24 individual baggies of cocaine was found on the living room coffee table.

=== Trial and appeals ===
At Hudson's trial for cocaine possession with intent to deliver and possession of a firearm during the commission of a felony, Hudson argued that—since the premature entry violated the knock-and-announce requirement and, therefore, according to the Supreme Court's decision in Wilson v. Arkansas (1995), his Fourth Amendment right to be free from unreasonable searches and seizures—the exclusionary rule required that the evidence obtained in the ensuing search must be suppressed. At the evidentiary hearing on the suppression motion, the prosecutor conceded that the police had violated the knock-and-announce requirement, and the trial judge granted the petitioner's motion to suppress.

In an interlocutory appeal by the prosecution, the Michigan Court of Appeals reversed, relying on Michigan Supreme Court cases holding that suppression is inappropriate when entry is made pursuant to a warrant but without proper "knock-and-announce." The Michigan Supreme Court declined to hear Hudson's appeal.

Following a bench trial, Hudson was convicted of possession of less than twenty-five grams of cocaine and sentenced to probation for eighteen months.

Hudson appealed to the Court of Appeals on the sole ground that the evidence seized during the execution of a search warrant should have been suppressed because the police violated the knock and announce statute. The court rejected his argument and affirmed his conviction. The Michigan Supreme Court again declined to review Hudson's case.

On June 27, 2005, the Supreme Court of the United States granted certiorari to hear the case. The Court heard oral arguments on January 9, 2006, and ordered an oral re-argument after the replacement of Justice O'Connor by Justice Alito and the apparent difficulty in deciding the case by the remaining eight members who originally heard the case. In both arguments, Timothy Baughman argued for the state and David Moran argued for Hudson. The question presented to the court was whether violation of the knock and announce rule requires a court to suppress all evidence found in the search. The Court issued its opinion on June 15, 2006.

== Decision ==
=== Majority ===
Justice Antonin Scalia, writing for the majority (5–4) with respect to Parts I, II and III of his opinion, held that evidence seized in violation of the knock-and-announce rule could be used against a defendant in a later criminal trial in comport with the Fourth Amendment and that judges cannot suppress such evidence for a knock-and-announce violation alone. He was joined by Chief Justice John Roberts, Justice Samuel Alito, Justice Clarence Thomas, and Justice Kennedy, who concurred in part and with the judgment.

Unlike previous cases addressing the knock-and-announce requirement, the Court did not need to address the question of whether the knock-and-announce rule was violated, as the State of Michigan had conceded the violation at trial. The question before the Court was regarding the remedy that should be afforded Hudson for the violation.

The majority notes that the Court first adopted an exclusionary rule for evidence seized without a warrant in Weeks v. United States, 232 U.S. 383 (1914), which was applied to the states in Mapp v. Ohio, 367 U.S. 643 (1961), but points out that the exclusionary rule was limited by later decisions. After discussing those decisions, Scalia wrote:

[E]xclusion may not be premised on the mere fact that a constitutional violation was a 'but-for' cause of obtaining evidence. Our cases show that but-for causality is only a necessary, not a sufficient, condition for suppression. In this case, of course, the constitutional violation of an illegal manner of entry was not a but-for cause of obtaining the evidence.

Scalia distinguished evidence seized in warrantless searches from evidence seized in searches that violated the knock-and-announce rule:

[ex]clusion of the evidence obtained by a warrantless search vindicates [the] entitlement [of citizens to shield their persons, houses, papers, and effects, from the government's scrutiny]. The interests protected by the knock-and-announce requirement are quite different—and do not include the shielding of potential evidence from the government's eyes.

The interests protected by the knock-and-announce rule, according to Scalia, are to protect police officers from surprised residents retaliating in presumed self-defense, to protect private property from damage, and to protect the "privacy and dignity" of residents. Scalia wrote that the knock-and-announce rule "has never protected ... one's interest in preventing the government from seeing or taking evidence described in a warrant."

The majority opinion goes on to note that the costs of exclusion for knock and announce violations outweigh the benefits of admitting the evidence. Scalia stated that the costs are small, but that "suppression of all evidence[] amount[s] in many cases is a get-out-of-jail-free card." The Court stated that exclusion of evidence has little or no deterrence effect, especially considering that deterrents (a civil action against the police department and internal discipline for officers) already existed. Scalia ended the portion of his opinion that constitutes the majority opinion with praise for the "increasing professionalism" of the police force over the last half-century, which he says makes some concerns expressed in past cases by the Court obsolete.

=== Kennedy's concurrence ===
Justice Kennedy concurred in part with Scalia's opinion and concurred in the judgment that a violation of the knock-and-announce rule does not require a court to exclude seized evidence. Kennedy's concurrence emphasizes that the Court has not disregarded the knock-and-announce rule through its decision and that the exclusionary rule continues to operate in other areas of criminal law, per the Court's precedent. Kennedy agreed with the majority that civil remedies and internal police discipline are adequate deterrents for knock-and-announce violations, but he went on to note that if a pattern of police behavior emerges that demonstrated disregard for the knock-and-announce rule, he would reevaluate his position.

=== Dissent ===
Justice Breyer, joined by Justice Ginsburg, Justice Stevens, and Justice Souter, dissented. Breyer began his dissent with a rebuke of the majority opinion:

In Wilson v. Arkansas, 514 U. S. 927 (1995), a unanimous Court held that the Fourth Amendment normally requires law enforcement officers to knock and announce their presence before entering a dwelling. Today's opinion holds that evidence seized from a home following a violation of this requirement need not be suppressed. As a result, the Court destroys the strongest legal incentive to comply with the Constitution's knock-and-announce requirement. And the Court does so without significant support in precedent. At least I can find no such support in the many Fourth Amendment cases the Court has decided in the near century since it first set forth the exclusionary principle in Weeks v. United States.

Breyer went on to examine the underlying case law, tracing the knock-and-announce rule to the 13th century, the writing of the Fourth Amendment, and the establishment of the exclusionary rule.

Breyer wrote that the strongest argument for application of the exclusionary rule to knock-and-announce violations is that it serves as a strong deterrent to unlawful government behavior. At the very least, according to Breyer, eliminating the exclusionary rule from consideration for knock-and-announce violations would cause some government agents to find it less risky to violate the rule. Pointing out that civil remedies are not an adequate deterrent, Breyer wrote:

[t]he cases reporting knock-and-announce violations are legion ... [y]et the majority ... has failed to cite a single reported case in which a plaintiff has collected more than nominal damages solely as a result of a knock-and-announce violation. ... [C]ivil immunities prevent tort law from being an effective substitute for the exclusionary rule at this time.

Breyer noted that in precedent, the Court has declined to apply the exclusionary rule only "(1)where there is a specific reason to believe that application of the rule would 'not result in appreciable deterrence,' or (2)where admissibility in proceedings other than criminal trials was at issue" (citations omitted). He stated that neither of those exclusions applied to knock-and-announce violations.

Breyer ended his dissent with a summary of his disagreement with the majority:

There may be instances in the law where text or history or tradition leaves room for a judicial decision that rests upon little more than an unvarnished judicial instinct. But this is not one of them. Rather, our Fourth Amendment traditions place high value upon protecting privacy in the home. They emphasize the need to assure that its constitutional protections are effective, lest the Amendment "sound the word of promise to the ear but break it to the hope." They include an exclusionary principle, which since Weeks has formed the centerpiece of the criminal law's effort to ensure the practical reality of those promises. That is why the Court should assure itself that any departure from that principle is firmly grounded in logic, in history, in precedent, and in empirical fact. It has not done so.

== Criticism ==
Samuel Walker criticized Justice Antonin Scalia, accusing him of distorting his work Taming the System: The Control of Discretion in American Criminal Justice. Scalia, in support of weakening the exclusionary rule, quoted from Taming the System that there has been tremendous progress "in the education, training and supervision of police officers" since Mapp v. Ohio in 1961. However, Walker's main argument was that the Warren Court, including setting the exclusionary rule under Mapp and the Miranda warning, set new standards for lawful conduct and enabled curbs on abuse.
