= Ker v. California =

- Supreme Court of the United States

Argued December 11, 1962 Decided June 10, 1963
- Full case name: Diane Ker, et. ux. v. California
- Citations: 374 U.S. 23 (more) 83 S. Ct. 1623; 10 L. Ed. 2d 726; 1963 U.S. LEXIS 2473; 24 Ohio Op. 2d 201

Case history
- Prior: Cert. to the District Court of Appeal of California, Second Appellate District

Holding
- The Fourth Amendment’s prohibition on unreasonable search and seizure and the exclusionary rule for evidence obtained from unreasonable search and seizure apply to the states through the Fourteenth Amendment.

Court membership
- Chief Justice Earl Warren Associate Justices Hugo Black · William O. Douglas; Tom C. Clark · John M. Harlan II; William J. Brennan Jr. · Potter Stewart; Byron White · Arthur Goldberg

Case opinions
- Majority: Clark, joined by Black, Stewart, White
- Concurrence: Harlan (in judgment)
- Concur/dissent: Brennan, joined by Warren, Douglas, Goldberg

Laws applied
- U.S. Const. amends. IV, XIV

Ker v. California, 374 U.S. 23 (1963), was a case before the United States Supreme Court, which incorporated the Fourth Amendment's protections against illegal search and seizure. The case was decided on June 10, 1963, by a vote of 5–4.

== Prior history ==
George Douglas and Diane Ker (a married couple) were convicted of possession of marijuana in Southern California. The two were arrested after officers from the Los Angeles County Sheriff's Department saw George Ker meeting another person who was suspected of selling illegal drugs. Although lighting conditions and distance prevented the officers observing this meeting from seeing any exchange of money or drugs between Ker and the other man, they believed Ker was part of a drug-trading ring. After losing their prime suspect, the officers went to the Kers' apartment and entered without consent or a warrant using a pass key supplied by the building manager. An officer observed a “brick-shaped package of green leafy substance” on the kitchen table and arrested both Kers. A subsequent warrantless search of the apartment and the Kers' car found more packaged and loose marijuana and marijuana seeds, all of which were used as evidence against the Kers.

After conviction in state Superior Court, both the California District Court of Appeals and the California Supreme Court upheld the conviction, ruling that the evidence was not seized in the course of an unlawful search.

== Case ==
The Court had decided two years earlier in Mapp v. Ohio that evidence seized in the course of an illegal search was inadmissible in a criminal trial in a state court. The Court extended that holding in this case, addressing the standard for deciding what are the fruits of an illegal search in state criminal trials. Clark's opinion addressed “the specific question as to whether Mapp requires the exclusion of evidence in this case which the California District Court of Appeal has held to be lawfully seized.” Unlike the previous case, where the search was clearly unreasonable, the District Court had found that the seizure of the drugs in the Kers’ apartment was allowed as being incident to an otherwise lawful arrest. The Supreme Court granted certiorari to give lower courts guidance on deciding when evidence is the fruit of an unlawful search or seizure.

The Court declared that the standards of reasonableness are the same under the Fourth and Fourteenth Amendments applying in Federal and State courts. Clark interpreted the Court's precedents in determining if the search of the Kers’ apartment and car were reasonable.

== Effects of the decision ==
The Kers themselves did not, however, personally benefit from this decision. The Supreme Court analyzed the evidence presented and agreed with the California courts that the seizure was incident to a lawful arrest. The Sheriff's officers had probable cause to make a warrantless arrest, and the most prominent evidence (the brick of marijuana) was in plain sight. Clark also dismissed the other reasonableness objections raised by the Kers. Brennan's opinion diverged from Clark's on this point, saying that the search was not reasonable under existing precedent.

== Subsequent history ==
Ker has been cited by subsequent decisions both for the holding of Fourth Amendment incorporation and for allowing warrantless search and seizure with probable cause or to prevent destruction of contraband. For example, Michigan v. Tyler, 436 U.S. 499 (1978), and Wilson v. Arkansas, 514 U.S. 927 (1995).

== See also ==
- List of United States Supreme Court cases, volume 374
- Miller v. United States, 357 U.S. 301 (1958)
