= Sneak and peek warrant =

Type of warrant allowing entry without the knowledge of the owner of the premises

A sneak and peek search warrant (officially called a Delayed Notice Warrant and also called a covert entry search warrant or a surreptitious entry search warrant) is a search warrant authorizing the law enforcement officers executing it to effect physical entry into private premises without the owner's or the occupant's permission or knowledge and to clandestinely search the premises; usually, such entry requires a stealthy breaking and entering.

== Instances ==
Law enforcement officers are not prohibited from seizing any property from the premises. For example, in one 2010 case, federal investigators broke into an apartment in Cleveland, Ohio, collected evidence, and then "trashed the place to make it look like a burglary." According to a Department of Justice document, DEA agents used a delayed-notice warrant to steal a suspect's car in March 2004. After following the suspect to a restaurant in Buffalo, New York, one agent "used a duplicate key to enter the vehicle and drive away while other agents spread broken glass in the parking space to create the impression that the vehicle had been stolen." Sneak and peek warrants are especially beneficial to illegal drug manufacturing investigations because they allow investigative teams to search the premises for chemicals and drug paraphernalia so that they can return with a traditional search warrant.

Researchers have stated that 11,000 Delayed Notice Warrants were used to enter premises in 2013, but questions have been raised whether this count includes other delayed notice warrants, such as GPS trackers on cars and investigations of emails.

== Patriot Act ==
Under the USA PATRIOT Act, signed into law during the 107th United States Congress, on October 26, 2001, for the first time in US history, sneak and peek warrants were used as standard procedure in investigations. Sneak and peek warrants are addressed in Section 213, under Title II, or the Enhanced Surveillance Procedures. Democrat Russ Feingold was the only senator to not vote for the act, with one of his reasons being it would enable the Sneak and peak warrant.

Sneak and peek warrants are not exclusive to acts of foreign and domestic terrorism but are applicable to any federal crime, including misdemeanors.

== See also ==
- Arrest warrant
- Writ of Assistance
- National Security Letter
