= Search warrant =

Type of court order

A search warrant is a court order that a magistrate or judge issues to authorise law enforcement officers to conduct a search of a person, location, or vehicle for evidence of a crime and to confiscate any evidence they find. In most countries, a search warrant cannot be issued in aid of civil process.

Jurisdictions that respect the rule of law and a right to privacy constrain police powers, and typically require search warrants or an equivalent procedure for searches police conducted in the course of a criminal investigation. The laws usually make an exception for hot pursuit: a police officer following a criminal who has fled the scene of a crime has the right to enter a property where the criminal has sought shelter. The necessity for a search warrant and its abilities vary from country to country. In certain authoritarian nations, police officers may be allowed to search individuals and private property without having to obtain permission or provide justification for their actions.

== United Kingdom ==
In England and Wales, a local magistrate issues search warrants, which require that a constable provide evidence that supports the warrant application.

Under Section 18(5)a of the Police and Criminal Evidence Act 1984, a constable can conduct a search immediately without an inspector's authorisation. This subsection allows a constable to search the home of a suspect under arrest in their presence before they take the suspect to a police station (or other custody location). Under Section 32 of the act, a constable who arrests a person who is on their own property or has just left their premises, may immediately search both the suspect and the immediate area.

In Scotland, a country operating on the distinct legal system of Scots law compared to England and Wales, the restrictions governing the use and execution of search warrants are set out under Part XIII of the Criminal Procedure (Scotland) Act 1995. Search warrants must be signed by a Sheriff after a petition from police.

Gas company officials may enter a home to inspect, repair, or replace gas meters by obtaining a warrant.

== Canada ==
To get a warrant, police must present a judge with an ITO (information to obtain) form that contains reasonable and probable grounds to believe an offence has been or is being committed and that the authorization sought will afford evidence of that offence. This hearing is ex parte, meaning only the crown is present. This fact obliges the police to include any known facts that hurt their application.

After a search the occupants receive a copy of the warrant and may receive a copy of the ITO through crown disclosure if the occupant(s) are charged. There are numerous warrant procedures in the Criminal Code. Some have specific requirements such as being served during daytime or having a named supervising officer present in the case of a home search. If these requirements are not met by the police the evidence found may become inadmissible against the accused at trial.

== United States ==
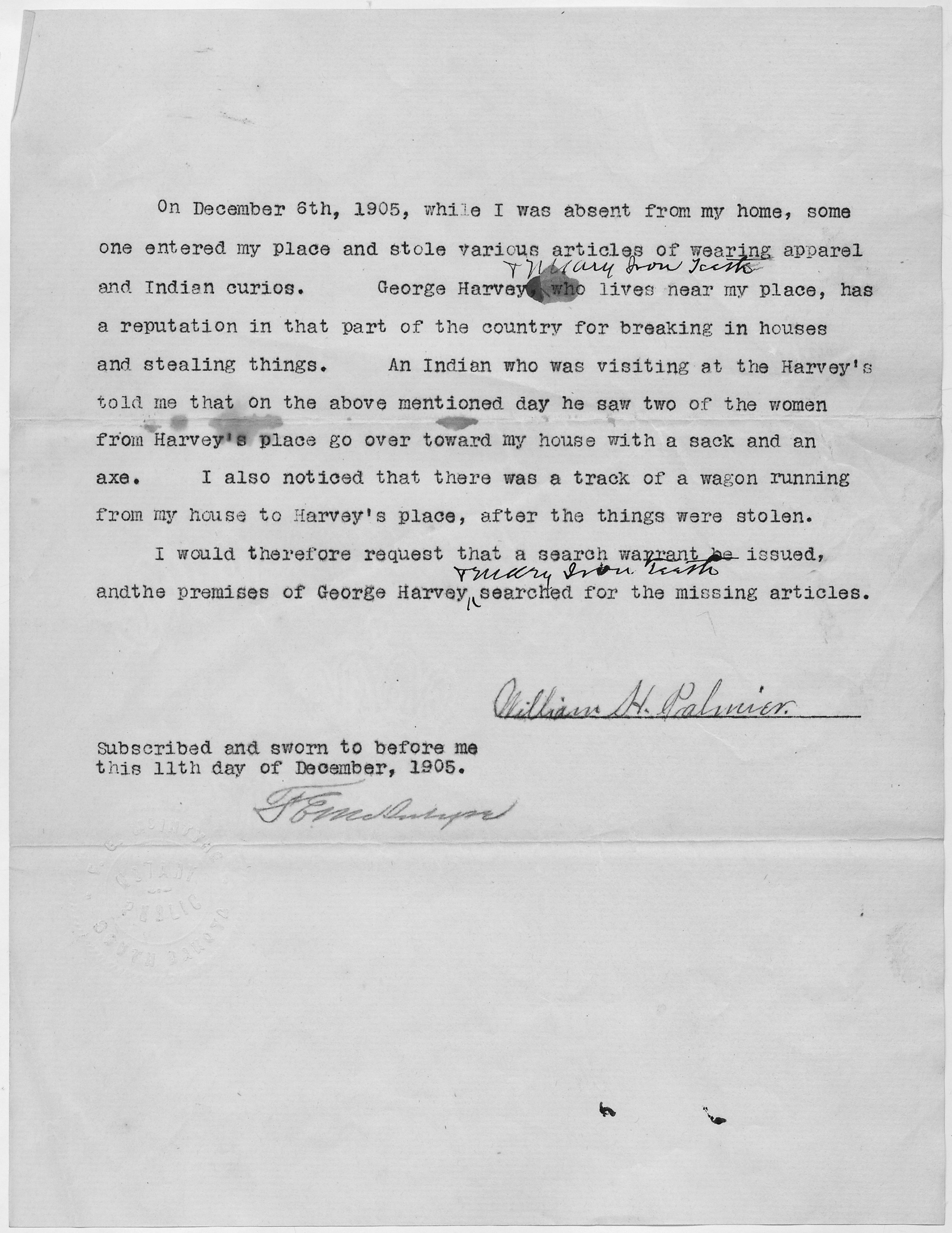
Request for a search warrant dated December 11, 1905

Under the Fourth Amendment to the United States Constitution, most police searches require a search warrant based on probable cause. The absence of valid consent or an exception to the warrant requirement (whether for purposes of effecting a search or an arrest) normally requires a warrant for police entry in an individual's home. The probable cause standard for obtaining a search warrant is lower than the quantum of proof required for a later criminal conviction, which requires proof beyond a reasonable doubt.

Under the Fourth Amendment, search warrants must be reasonable and particular. This means that a search warrant must reasonably identify the items to be searched for and the place where law enforcement officials are authorized to search for those items. Unless an exception to the warrant requirement applies, the search of other buildings or areas of a building, persons or vehicles, or the search for additional items that do not reasonably fall under the original warrant, will normally require additional search warrants.

To obtain a search warrant, an officer must prove to a magistrate or judge that probable cause exists for the proposed search, based upon direct information (i.e., the officer's personal observation) or other reliable information. An application for a search warrant will often rely upon hearsay information, such as information obtained from a confidential informant, as long as probable cause exists based on the totality of the circumstances. Police can seize both property and persons under a search warrant.

The issue of federal search warrants is determined under Title 18 of the United States Code. The law has been restated and extended under Rule 41 of the Federal Rules of Criminal Procedure. Federal search warrants may be prepared on Form AO 93, Search and Seizure Warrant. Although the laws are broadly similar, each state has its own laws and rules of procedure governing the issuance of warrants.

Search warrants are normally available to the public. On the other hand, they may be sealed if they contain sensitive information.

=== Exceptions ===
Certain searches do not require a search warrant. For example,

- Consent: a warrant is not required when a person in control of the object or property gives consent for the search.
- Hot pursuit of a felon (to prevent a felon's escape or ability to harm others);
- Imminent destruction of evidence: where evidence might be destroyed before a warrant can be properly obtained;
- Emergency searches: such as when someone is heard screaming, yelling, or calling for help inside a dwelling; or
- Search incident to arrest (to mitigate the risk of harm to the arresting officers specifically).
- Public safety: a warrantless search may be permissible in an emergency situation where the public is in danger.
- Plain view: evidence is in the plain view of law enforcement officers, from a lawful vantage point (with similar exceptions that include plain smell, where the officer detects an odor that clearly indicates the presence of contraband or criminal activity).

In a plain view case, the officer is legitimately on the premises, his observation is from a legitimate vantage point, and it is immediately obvious that the evidence is contraband. The plain view rule applies, for example, when the officer has pulled the suspect over for a seat belt violation and sees a syringe on the passenger seat.

==== Protective sweep ====
If the subject is arrested in a home or vehicle, police may perform a protective search to make sure that there are no weapons within the vicinity. For example, they may search for weapons in the room where they arrested the subject of a warrant, and conduct a "protective sweep" of the premises if they reasonably suspect that other individuals may be hiding.

==== Rental properties and hotel rooms ====
With rented property, a landlord may refuse to allow law enforcement to search a tenant's apartment without a search warrant, and police must obtain a warrant under the same guidelines as if the tenant were the owner of the property.

People who are occupying rooms at hotels or motels have a reasonable expectation of privacy in their rooms. However, a warrantless search may be possible if the hotel guest has property in their room a considerable period of time after the scheduled check-out time.

==== Motor vehicle exception ====
As first established by Carroll v. United States (1925), police are allowed to search a vehicle without a search warrant when they have probable cause to believe that evidence or contraband is located in a vehicle. When police arrest an individual shortly after the individual has exited a vehicle, the police may conduct a full search of the suspect's person, any area within that person's immediate reach, and the passenger compartment of the recently occupied vehicle for weapons or any other contraband. However, Arizona v. Gant (2009) limits such searches to circumstances where the arrested person could have accessed the vehicle, or when the vehicle could contain evidence of the crime the person is arrested for. As per Collins v. Virginia (2018), the exception does not apply when the vehicle is within the home or curtilage of the home of its owner.

==== Border search exception ====
Under The Border Search Exception custom and immigration officers are not required to have a warrant or probable cause to conduct searches and seizures at international borders and their functional equivalents.

This doctrine is not actually an exception to the Fourth Amendment, but rather to the Amendment's requirement for a warrant or probable cause. Balanced against the sovereign's interests at the border are the Fourth Amendment rights of entrants. Not only is the expectation of privacy less at the border than in the interior, the Fourth Amendment balance between the interests of the Government and the privacy right of the individual is also struck much more favorably to the Government at the border. This balance at international borders means that routine searches are "reasonable" there, and therefore do not violate the Fourth Amendment's proscription against "unreasonable searches and seizures".

=== Delayed notice ===
A sneak and peek search warrant (officially called a delayed notice warrant and also a covert entry search warrant or a surreptitious entry search warrant) is a search warrant authorizing the law enforcement officers executing it to effect physical entry into private premises without the owner's or the occupant's permission or knowledge and to clandestinely search the premises.

=== Gag orders ===
In California, the California Electronic Communications Privacy Act mandates that in certain cases concerning electronic search warrants that the court issue gag orders "[...] prohibiting any party providing information from notifying any other party that information has been sought [...]".

== See also ==
- Arrest warrant
- National Security Letter
- No-knock warrant, to enter a property without occupant notification
- Parallel construction – the untruthful description of the origins of evidence, to avoid laws about search or otherwise
- Police
- SWAT - SWAT Teams can raid homes with a search warrant
- Reverse search warrant
- Sneak and peek warrant, to clandestinely look inside a property
- Search and seizure
- Sugar bowl (legal maxim)
- Writ of Assistance
