= Miller v. United States (1958) =

- Supreme Court of the United States

Argued January 28, 1958 Decided June 23, 1958
- Full case name: William Miller v. United States
- Citations: 357 U.S. 301 (more) 78 S. Ct. 1190; 2 L. Ed. 2d 1332, 1958 U.S. LEXIS 753

Case history
- Prior: 244 F.2d 750 (D.C. Cir. 1957); cert. granted, 353 U.S. 957 (1957).

Holding
- Petitioner could not lawfully be arrested in his home by officers breaking in without first giving him notice of their authority and purpose, the arrest was unlawful, the evidence seized was inadmissible, and the conviction is reversed.

Court membership
- Chief Justice Earl Warren Associate Justices Hugo Black · Felix Frankfurter; William O. Douglas · Harold H. Burton; Tom C. Clark · John M. Harlan II; William J. Brennan Jr. · Charles E. Whittaker

Case opinions
- Majority: Brennan, joined by Warren, Black, Frankfurter, Douglas, Whittaker
- Concurrence: Harlan
- Dissent: Clark, joined by Burton

Laws applied
- Fourth Amendment

Miller v. United States, 357 U.S. 301 (1958), was a landmark decision by the United States Supreme Court, which held that one could not lawfully be arrested in one's home by officers breaking in without first giving one notice of their authority and purpose.

== Background ==
At 1:35 a.m., on March 25, 1955, Federal Bureau of Narcotics agents, serving an arrest warrant, arrested a heroin user, Clifford Reed, on a public street in Washington, DC, for various offences related to narcotics. While in custody, Reed informed federal narcotics agents that he had purchased 100 capsules of morphine from a drug dealer, Arthur R. Shepherd, via a middleman, William Miller, who was 17 years old at the time. Miller had had several run-ins with the law and had been convicted of a narcotics offence in 1953. Reed told agents that he was to meet Shepherd in the later morning hours to make another purchase. The agents then enlisted Reed to aid in the capture of Miller and Shepherd.

Later, at about 3:00 a.m., an undercover agent carrying $100 in marked currency went to Shepherd's home with Reed by taxicab. Reed introduced the agent to Shepherd as a buyer. The agent gave Shepherd the money, and Shepherd promised that another 100 capsules would be procured from Miller and delivered to the agent's home. Shepherd went by taxi to Miller's apartment. The taxi was monitored by federal agents, along with Washington D.C. Metropolitan Police officers. Shepherd got out of the taxi and went into the apartment, which Miller shared with a woman, Bessie Byrd, who was involved in the operation. He entered the basement to remove the drugs from storage, but federal agents could not observe him there. A few minutes later, he came out of the basement and re-entered the cab.

Shepherd was going back to Reed's apartment when the police officers pulled the car over, and he was then arrested and searched. The currency that was given to him by the agent was not found on his person, but he admitted to the officers that the 100 capsules of morphine found on the passenger seat were put there by him after the cab was pulled over. He claimed that the package of capsules was behind a fire extinguisher in the basement hallway, where he was sent by a "fellow" with Reed, who had promised him $10 for retrieving it.

The federal agents and police then returned to Miller's apartment. At about 3:45, they knocked on the door, and a low voice was heard, saying, "Who's there?" The reply was "Police." Miller opened the door, leaving the door chain on and asked what their purpose was. When the agent and officer did not respond, he attempted to close the door. According to the officer, "He took one look at me and tried to slam the door, at which time I grabbed the door and opened it. We put our hands inside the door and pulled and ripped the chain off." They did not have a search warrant or an arrest warrant, and they did not demand admission into the home or express their purpose. Miller was not arrested until they entered his apartment. Bessie Byrd was arrested, and $34 of the money that Shepherd had been given was found on her person. During a search of the apartment, the remaining $66 was found, part in a hatbox in the closet and part under the covers of a bed.

== Trial and appeals ==
Byrd, Shepherd, and Miller were charged with conspiracy to commit violations and violations of federal narcotics laws. At first, all three filed a motion to suppress the evidence, arguing that it was seized without probable cause. The trial court denied the motion, and they were convicted of all charges. They then appealed to The Court of Appeals for the District of Columbia Circuit, which upheld their conviction:

That these facts spelled out probable cause to arrest Shepherd cannot be doubted. Shepherd did not deny one iota of the testimony which established the commission of the offence in the presence of the officers. His own statement putting him in the very place where the information of the officers attributable to Reed indicated he would go, together with what the officers had observed and the plan which was in process under their surveillance, brought the case squarely within the Court's ruling in the Scher case, and our own Shettel case.

Moreover, viewing the case as a whole, neither Shepherd nor his co-accused were helped when the only defence testimony identified him as a brother of Mrs. Byrd who admitted Shepherd to the apartment [100 U.S.App.D.C. 306] that morning. Both Miller and Mrs. Byrd denied to the officers that Shepherd had been at their apartment, but at the trial, a different version developed The only defence witness, Octavia Walker, said she and another woman and Mrs. Byrd, sometime after 1 A.M. went to a night club for drinks. Returning after 2 A.M. to the Byrd-Miller apartment, she said Miller was asleep, and the three women went into the kitchen to fix a 'snack.' About 2:30 A.M. Shepherd appeared, came into the kitchen and handed his sister $100 for 'safe-keeping,' saying it was money he had won gambling. After a brief stay, Shepherd left. Shepherd, even by the defence had definitely been placed in the apartment with Miller and Mrs. Byrd and with $100 which he left there. Perhaps neither judge nor jury believed he won the money gambling.

There is no substance to the claimed errors with reference to the conspiracy or the instruction as to 'aiding and abetting.' There was no merger of the substantive offences, indeed, they were separate and distinct, while the general agreement among the appellants was clearly deducible from the evidence and could be deemed to be continuous and persisting.

Nor is there merit to the claim that the argument by Government counsel so prejudiced the appellants that a fair trial was denied. Nor only was there a current failure then to object, but upon review we are satisfied there was no error.

What has been or will be said as to the facts will make clear that there is only one question in this case. Miller and Mrs. Byrd in advance of trial moved to suppress the use of the marked money, claiming it had been illegally seized. The seizure in turn depends upon the validity of their arrest. The supporting affidavit offered by these two appellants recited in part:

'That at about four (4) o'clock, A.M., on the morning of March 25, 1955, they were awakened in their apartment, located at Columbia Road, N.W., Washington, D.C., by the noise created by someone breaking in a doorway in the hallway, leading to their apartment (only), and that upon his cracking his door (with a chain thereon), to ascertain the origin of said noise, that officers Wilson, Pappas and four others did break the chain off of the door, and forcibly enter his apartment.'

Just what happened in exact detail at the doorway to apartment #1 and precisely what was said by the respective participants cannot be determined conclusively from the record before us. The whole episode must have involved only a few seconds. At the hearing on the motion, the only witnesses called, Officer Wurms and Agent Wilson, testified that Officer Wurms knocked on Miller's door, and when a voice from inside asked 'Who's there?', Wurms answered, 'Blue, police.' Miller opened the door and looked out. The officers immediately recognized him and Miller recognized them. 'Did he say anything when he opened the door?' 'Yes, sir, he didn't want to let us in.' 'What were his words?' 'I can't recall, but he wanted to know what we were doing there.' Miller tried to close the door. Officer Wurms tried to keep it open. 'He took one look at me and tried to slam the door, at which time I grabbed the door and opened it.' The door was not broken, but a door chain was."

== Decision ==
In a 7-2 majority opinion authored by Justice William Brennan, with a concurrence by Justice John M. Harlan, the Court ruled that the arrest and conviction of all three petitioners violated the Fourth Amendment. The Court's reasoning was that the statutory requirements of law enforcement having to notify a suspect of their authority and purpose were not met. Furthermore, Miller's reaction was reasonable, as the officers did not notify him of their purpose and authority. The mere fact that he attempted to shut the door on them did not necessarily mean that he already knew why they were at his house. The officers could not break the door down and arrest Miller because Miller did not receive any notice in the first place, making the arrest unlawful and the evidence the fruits of an illegal search:

But, first, the fact that petitioner attempted to close the door did not of itself prove that he knew their purpose to arrest him. It was an ambiguous act. It could have been merely the expected reaction of any citizen having this experience at that hour of the morning, particularly since it does not appear that the officers were in uniform, cf. Accarino v. United States, supra, 85 U.S.App.D.C. at 403, 179 F.2d at 465, and the answer "Police" was spoken "in a low voice," and might not have been heard by the petitioner, so far as the officers could tell.

Second, petitioner's reaction upon opening the door could only have created doubt in the officers' minds that he knew they were police intent on arresting him. On the motion to suppress, Agent Wilson testified that "he wanted to know what we were doing there." This query, which went unanswered, is, on its face, inconsistent with knowledge. The majority of the Court of Appeals denied the import of the query by inferring that Miller knew Wilson and Wurms personally and recognized them as soon as he opened the door. That inference has no support in the record. But, even if this inference were supportable, Miller's recognition of Wilson and Wurms as police officers would not have justified them, in light of other facts known to them, in being virtually certain that Miller actually knew the reason for their presence. The officers knew that petitioner was unaware of Shepherd's arrest; they knew that he was unaware that the currency was marked; they knew that he was unaware that their presence was pursuant to a plan, initiated by Reed's disclosures, to catch the petitioner in a criminal act. Moreover, they did not actually know that petitioner had made a sale to Shepherd and received the marked money, for Shepherd had not talked, and had not been seen to enter petitioner's apartment. The fact that the marked money was found in the apartment has no bearing upon the petitioner's knowledge of the officers' purpose, since he did not know that the money was marked. This Court said in United States v. Di Re, supra, at 332 U. S. 595:

"We have had frequent occasion to point out that a search is not to be made legal by what it turns up. In law, it is good or bad when it starts, and does not change character from its success."

The most that can be said is that the petitioner's act in attempting to close the door might be the basis for the officers being virtually certain that the petitioner knew there were police at his door conducting an investigation. This, however, falls short of a virtual certainty that the petitioner knew of their purpose to arrest him. The requirement is not met except by notice of that purpose, for the Government admits that the officers had no authority to break the petitioner's door except to arrest him. We must, therefore, conclude that the petitioner did not receive the required notice of authority and purpose.

We are duly mindful of the reliance that society must place for achieving law and order upon the enforcing agencies of the criminal law. But insistence on observance by law officers of traditional fair procedural requirements is, from the long point of view, best calculated to contribute to that end. However much in a particular case insistence upon such rules may appear as a technicality that inures to the benefit of a guilty person, the history of the criminal law proves that tolerance of shortcut methods in law enforcement impairs its enduring effectiveness. The requirement of prior notice of authority and purpose before forcing entry into a home is deeply rooted in our heritage, and should not be given grudging application. Congress, codifying a tradition embedded in Anglo-American law, has declared in § 3109 the reverence of the law for the individual's right of privacy in his house. Every householder, the good and the bad, the guilty and the innocent, is entitled to the protection designed to secure the common interest against unlawful invasion of the house. The petitioner could not be lawfully arrested in his home by officers breaking in without first giving him notice of their authority and purpose. Because the petitioner did not receive that notice before the officers broke the door to invade his home, the arrest was unlawful, and the evidence seized should have been suppressed.

=== Clark's dissent ===
Justice Tom C. Clark dissented, which Justice Harold H. Burton joined, expounding that the Court of Appeals had concluded that Miller knew what purpose the agent and the officer were there for, and he was attempting to destroy evidence by slamming the door. He also argued that slamming the door on officers was not a "normal homeowner's reaction" and that the Court ignored the "exigent circumstances" that was presented in the initial encounter. He wrote that the Court of Appeals:

agreed with the trial judge "that the attempt of the officers to arrest Miller at his doorway under the circumstances of this case was not unreasonable," and found that the breaking of the door chain "in the course of his resistance [was] immaterial, and his arrest, immediately made, was justified." 100 U.S.App.D.C. at 310, 244 F.2d at 758. Concluding that Miller without doubt was aware both of the officers' identity and purpose, the court upheld the refusal of the trial court to suppress the evidence, and found the proof of guilt "overwhelming and unanswerable."

The majority, however, brushes aside these conclusions, explaining petitioner's action in slamming the door as "the expected reaction of any citizen." This is something entirely foreign to my concept of the respect a law-abiding citizenry pays to its law enforcement officers. Nor can I accept the conclusion of the Court that the circumstances found by the Court of Appeals fall "short of a virtual certainty that the petitioner knew of [the officers'] purpose to arrest him." His knowledge -- in the absence of an express admission by him -- can never be a "virtual certainty." Rather than attempting to psychoanalyze petitioner, we should measure his understanding by his outward acts. The Court of Appeals found that they indisputably established petitioner's awareness of the police purpose. We should not disturb that finding.

The majority does not deal with the "exigent circumstances" of the case, because the Government makes no claim for thus "excusing compliance" with the statute. The Court of Appeals expressly based its opinion on the fact that the officers "were confronted by the need for a decision arising from the necessitous circumstances of the situation." The position of the Government does not excuse us from evaluating the circumstances of the whole case. I believe that the Court of Appeals was eminently correct in its conclusion that "necessitous circumstances" here warranted the officers in entering the apartment. As that court pointed out, petitioner might have fled or hidden himself or destroyed the fruits of his crime, particularly in view of his background and the visit of his brother-in-law Shepherd only a few moments before. Certainly he soon would have learned of Shepherd's arrest. Moreover, his attempt to forcibly prevent the entry of the officers into his apartment required their immediate action. Any delay might well have precluded the arrest. Destruction of the marked money might have prevented the establishment of petitioner's guilt. As the Government points out, "split-second action [was] necessary."

== See also ==
- List of United States Supreme Court cases, volume 357
- Ker v. California, 374 U.S. 23 (1963)
