= Wilson v. Arkansas =

- Supreme Court of the United States

Argued March 28, 1995 Decided May 22, 1995
- Full case name: Sharlene Wilson, Petitioner v. Arkansas
- Citations: 514 U.S. 927 (more) 115 S. Ct. 1914; 131 L. Ed. 2d 976; 1995 U.S. LEXIS 3464; 63 U.S.L.W. 4456; 95 Cal. Daily Op. Service 3823; 95 Daily Journal DAR 6470; 9 Fla. L. Weekly Fed. S 67

Case history
- Prior: On writ of cert. to the Supreme Court of Arkansas

Holding
- "The "knock and announce" rule survives and must be considered when analyzing the constitutionality of a search.

Court membership
- Chief Justice William Rehnquist Associate Justices John P. Stevens · Sandra Day O'Connor; Antonin Scalia · Anthony Kennedy; David Souter · Clarence Thomas; Ruth Bader Ginsburg · Stephen Breyer

Case opinion
- Majority: Thomas, joined by unanimous

Laws applied
- Fourth Amendment

Wilson v. Arkansas, 514 U.S. 927 (1995), is a United States Supreme Court decision in which the Court held that the traditional, common-law-derived "knock and announce" rule for executing search warrants must be incorporated into the "reasonableness" analysis of whether the actual execution of the warrant is/was justified under the 4th Amendment. The high court thus ruled that the old "knock and announce" rule while not a hard requirement, was also not a dead letter.

== Background ==
Between November and December 1992, Sharlene Wilson, a drug dealer, shared a home with her boyfriend, Bryson Jacobs. During this period of time, an informant working for the Arkansas State Police purchased marijuana and methamphetamine from her. Later, in late November, the same informant contacted Wilson by telephone to arrange a marijuana deal at a local store. According to the informant's testimony, when Wilson showed up to conduct the deal, she waved a semi-automatic pistol in front of her face, threatening to kill her if she found out that she was working for the authorities. The informant then bought a bag of marijuana and left. The next day, acting on information from the informant, police officers applied for search warrants, which stated that Jacobs and Wilson had to be arrested. Affidavits detailed the informant's drug deals and Jacobs' previous convictions of arson and firebombing. In the afternoon, a search was conducted. When police officers approached the property, they had found the door to be unlocked. In the process of opening an unlocked screen door, the officers identified themselves and announced that they had a warrant. Coming inside the house, the officers confiscated marijuana, methamphetamine, Valium, drug paraphernalia, a weapon, and ammunition. When the officers were looking for Wilson and Jacobs, they had found her inside a bathroom, attempting to destroy evidence by flushing marijuana down a toilet. Jacobs and Wilson were arrested and charged with delivery of marijuana, delivery of methamphetamine, possession of drug paraphernalia, and possession of marijuana.

=== Trial and State Appeals ===
During a pre-trial hearing, Wilson filed a motion to suppress against the evidence that was found during the search. She argued that the search was invalid because the officers did not knock on the door and identify themselves before they entered. This action, according to her, justified excluding the evidence against her. The motion was subsequently denied, and she was convicted of all charges on a jury trial. She received a sentence of 32 years in prison. Her conviction was upheld by the Arkansas Supreme Court, reasoning that,"

Ms. Wilson submits the officers executing the search failed to knock and announce their identity before entering the residence. The testimony indicated that the officers entered the home while they were identifying themselves. Ms. Wilson relies upon Miller v. United States, 357 U.S. 301 (1958), as the sole authority for her argument. The appellant contends, based upon Miller, that the Fourth Amendment requires officers to knock and announce prior to entering the residence. However, Miller involved a statute, 18 U.S.C. § 3109, which specified that a law enforcement officer, executing a search warrant, may break open a door only if, "after notice of his authority and purpose," he is denied admittance. The Fourth Amendment was not mentioned.

There is no authority for Ms. Wilson's theory that the knock and announce principle is required by the Fourth Amendment. Furthermore, Ark.R.Crim.P. 13.3 outlines the procedure to be followed in the execution of a search warrant, and provides in part:

(e) The executing officer, and other officers accompanying and assisting him, may use such degree of force, short of deadly force, against persons, or to effect entry or to open containers as is reasonably necessary for the successful execution of the search warrant with all practicable safety.

Rule 13.3 does not contain a "knock and announce" rule. See also Dodson v. State, 4 Ark.App. 1, 626 S.W.2d 624 (1982) (Glaze, J., concurring), cert. denied, 457 U.S. 1136, 102 S.Ct. 2966, 73 L.Ed.2d 1355 (1982)."

== Opinion of the Supreme Court ==
In a unanimous (9–0) decision, the Supreme Court reversed the decision of the Arkansas Supreme Court, finding for Wilson. Clarence Thomas authored the majority opinion, arguing that the "knock-and-announce" rule is a part of the reasonableness standard applied while conducting a search, according to the rules of common law":

The Fourth Amendment to the Constitution protects "[t]he right of the people to be secure in their persons, houses, papers, and effects, against unreasonable searches and seizures." In evaluating the scope of this right, we have looked to the traditional protections against unreasonable searches and seizures afforded by the common law at the time of the framing. See California v. Hodari D., 499 U.S. 621, 624 (1991); United States v. Watson, 423 U.S. 411, 418-420 (1976); Carroll v. United States, 267 U.S. 132, 149 (1925). "Although the underlying command of the Fourth Amendment is always that searches and seizures be reasonable," New Jersey v. T. L. O., 469 U.S. 325, 337 (1985), our effort to give content to this term may be guided by the meaning ascribed to it by the Framers of the Amendment. An examination of the common law of search and seizure leaves no doubt that the reasonableness of a search of a dwelling may depend in part on whether law enforcement officers announced their presence and authority prior to entering."

Furthermore, the decision was reversed on the grounds that the Arkansas Supreme Court did not sufficiently address the arguments of the State of Arkansas' justifications for the search and arrest of Wilson and Jacobs":

Respondent contends that the judgment below should be affirmed because the unannounced entry in this case was justified for two reasons. First, respondent argues that police officers reasonably believed that a prior announcement would have placed them in peril, given their knowledge that petitioner had threatened a government informant with a semiautomatic weapon and that Mr. Jacobs had previously been convicted of arson and firebombing. Second, respondent suggests that prior announcement would have produced an unreasonable risk that petitioner would destroy easily disposable narcotics evidence.

These considerations may well provide the necessary justification for the unannounced entry in this case. Because the Arkansas Supreme Court did not address their sufficiency, however, we remand to allow the state courts to make any necessary findings of fact and to make the determination of reasonableness in the first instance."

== See also ==
- Hudson v. Michigan (2006)
- List of United States Supreme Court cases, volume 514
- List of United States Supreme Court cases
- Lists of United States Supreme Court cases by volume
- List of United States Supreme Court cases by the Rehnquist Court
