= Elkins v. United States =

- Supreme Court of the United States

Argued March 28–29, 1960 Decided June 27, 1960
- Full case name: James Butler Elkins and Raymond Frederick Clark v. United States of America
- Citations: 364 U.S. 206 (more) 80 S. Ct. 1437; 4 L. Ed. 2d 1669; 1960 U.S. LEXIS 1989

Case history
- Prior: 266 F.2d 588 (9th Cir. 1959); cert. granted, 361 U.S. 810 (1959).
- Subsequent: New trial ordered on remand, 195 F. Supp. 757 (D. Or. 1961).

Holding
- Evidence gathered by state or local authorities is inadmissible in federal court if it was gathered in violation of the Fourth Amendment

Court membership
- Chief Justice Earl Warren Associate Justices Hugo Black · Felix Frankfurter; William O. Douglas · Tom C. Clark; John M. Harlan II · William J. Brennan Jr. Charles E. Whittaker · Potter Stewart

Case opinions
- Majority: Stewart, joined by Warren, Black, Douglas, Brennan
- Dissent: Frankfurter, joined by Harlan, Clark, Whittaker
- Dissent: Harlan, joined by Clark, Whittaker

Laws applied
- U.S. Const. amend. IV
- This case overturned a previous ruling or rulings
- Lustig v. United States (1949)

Elkins v. United States, 364 U.S. 206 (1960), was a US Supreme Court decision that held the "silver platter doctrine", which allowed federal prosecutors to use evidence illegally gathered by state police, to be a violation of the Fourth Amendment to the United States Constitution.

Evidence of illegal wiretapping had been seized from the home of James Butler Elkins by Portland, Oregon police officers on an unrelated search warrant, and he was subsequently convicted in federal court. Elkins appealed, arguing that evidence found by the officers should have been inadmissible under the exclusionary rule, which forbids the introduction of most evidence gathered through Fourth Amendment violations in criminal court.

In a 5–4 decision, the Court overturned the silver platter doctrine and Elkins' conviction. Associate Justice Potter Stewart wrote the majority opinion, while Associate Justices Felix Frankfurter and John M. Harlan II dissented. By giving a rationale for a broader interpretation of Fourth Amendment rights, the decision prepared the way for Mapp v. Ohio (1961), which applied the exclusionary rule to the states.

== Silver platter doctrine ==
The Fourth Amendment prevents most warrantless searches by law enforcement officers, and since Weeks v. United States (1914), has been enforced by the exclusionary rule, which excludes most evidence gathered through Fourth Amendment violations from criminal trials. While Wolf v. Colorado (1949) had held the amendment to apply to the states, a process known as incorporation, the exclusionary rule had explicitly not been incorporated by the decision. Evidence gathered by state law enforcement was therefore not yet bound by the same strictures as that gathered by federal law enforcement.

In Lustig v. United States (1949), Justice Felix Frankfurter coined the silver platter doctrine, ruling that evidence gathered by Fourth Amendment violations was still admissible if state police gave it to federal officials on "a silver platter"—that is, without any level of involvement by federal authorities. This doctrine nonetheless created an incentive for federal authorities to coordinate with state law enforcement in the gathering of evidence.

== Background of the case ==
Portland, Oregon police officers searched the home of James Butler Elkins, ostensibly for obscene material, and seized tape recordings that Elkins had made from illegal wiretaps. He was subsequently convicted in federal court of intercepting and divulging telephone communications, but appealed his federal conviction on the grounds that state police had gathered the evidence against him in violation of his Fourth Amendment rights. His conviction was upheld by the Ninth US Circuit Court of Appeals.

== Court's decision ==
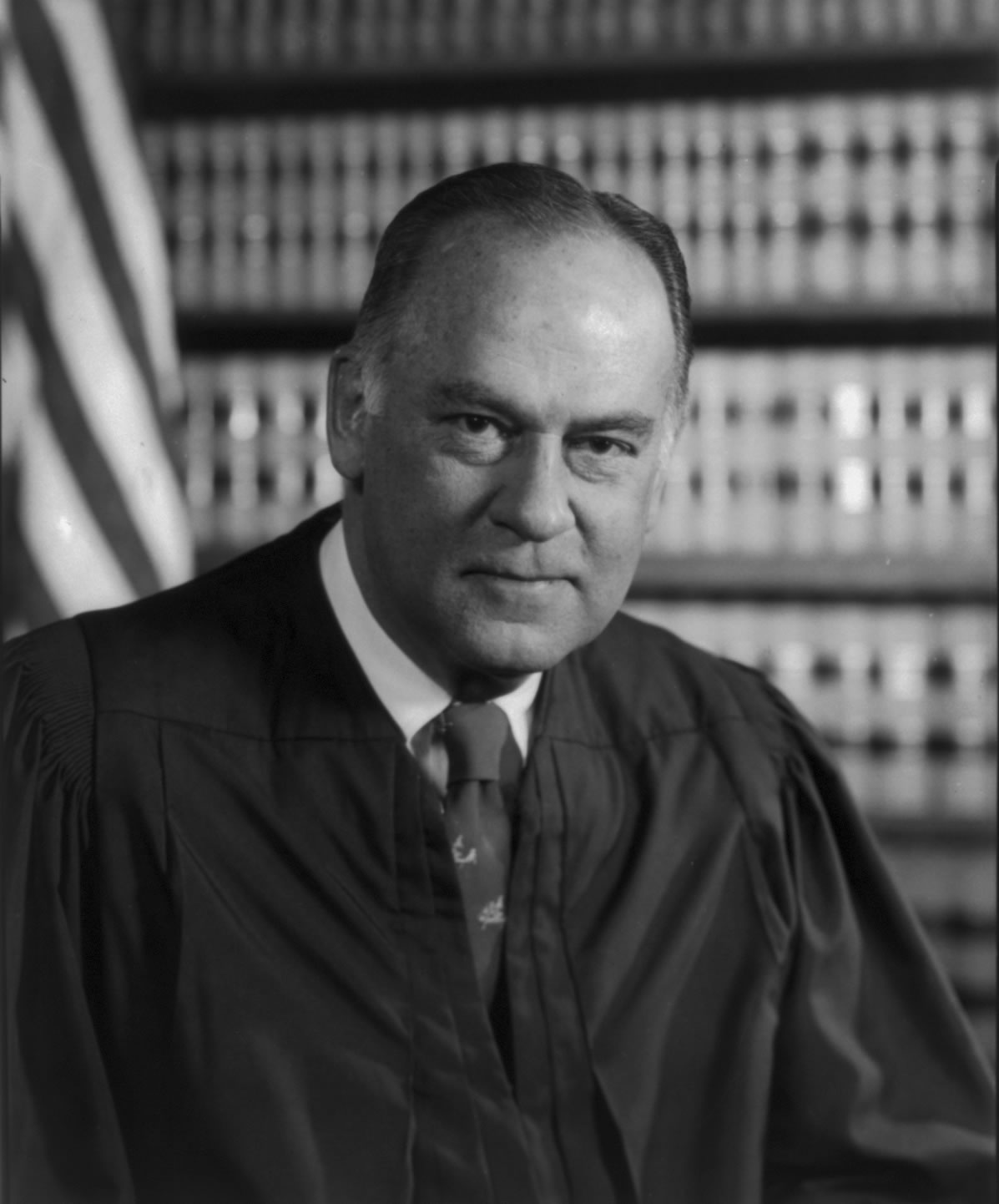
Associate Justice Potter Stewart

Associate Justice Potter Stewart delivered the opinion of the court in this case, in which Chief Justice Earl Warren and Associate Justices Hugo Black, William O. Douglas, and William J. Brennan, Jr. joined. Associate Justice Felix Frankfurter wrote a dissenting opinion that was joined by Associate Justices John M. Harlan II, Charles E. Whittaker, and Tom C. Clark. Harlan also wrote a dissenting opinion, joined by Whittaker and Clark.

The Court overturned the silver platter doctrine, ruling that "[e]vidence obtained by state officers during a search which, if conducted by federal officers, would have violated the defendant's immunity from unreasonable searches and seizures under the Fourth Amendment is inadmissible". Elkins' conviction was therefore overturned. Stewart wrote that the primary purpose of the exclusionary rule was to provide a disincentive to abuses by law enforcement, stating that "[t]he rule is calculated to prevent, not to repair. Its purpose is to deter—to compel respect for the constitutional guaranty in the only effectively available way—by removing the incentive to disregard it."

Frankfurter's dissent criticized the extension of the exclusionary rule, noting that the conduct of the state police in the Elkins investigation had already been found illegal at the state level; he argued that the Court's extension of the rule would only create further confusion, and that the relation between federal and state criminal law should be governed by the principle of federalism. Harlan's dissent followed similar reasoning to Frankfurter's and argued that Elkins' conviction should be upheld.

Scholar Jacob W. Landynski called Stewart's opinion "the most thorough and convincing analysis in favor of the exclusionary rule to be found in any opinion of the Court". In giving a rationale for a broader interpretation of Fourth Amendment rights, the decision set the stage for Mapp v. Ohio (1961), which applied the exclusionary rule to the states.
