= Dollree Mapp =

American privacy rights litigant (1923–2014)

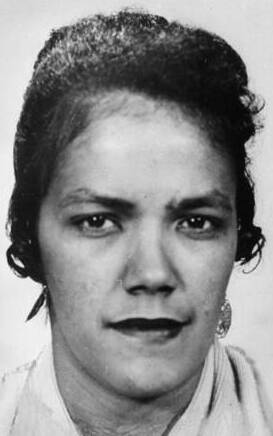
- Mapp's mugshot after her 1957 arrest
- Born: Dollree Mapp; October 30, 1923; Forest, Mississippi, U.S.
- Died: October 31, 2014 (aged 91); Conyers, Georgia, U.S.
- Burial place: Queens, New York, U.S.
- Other name: Dolly
- Known for: Appellant in Mapp v. Ohio
- Criminal charges: Possession of Obscene Material and Possession of Illegal Drugs
- Spouse: Jimmy Bivins
- Partner: Archie Moore
- Children: Barbara Bivins
- Relatives: Carolyn Mapp

Dollree Mapp (October 30, 1923 – October 31, 2014) was the appellant in the Supreme Court case Mapp v. Ohio (1961). She argued that her right to privacy in her home, the Fourth Amendment, was violated by police officers who entered her house with what she thought to be a fake search warrant. Mapp also argued that the Exclusionary Rule was violated due to the collection of the evidence that was found after the police had entered her house without a convincing search warrant according to Mapp's experience. In the Supreme Court case, Mapp v. Ohio, the decision was made in favor of Mapp, in a 6–3 ruling. As a result of the ruling in Mapp v. Ohio, Mapp's conviction was voided. A few years after Mapp v. Ohio was ruled upon, Mapp was convicted again, but this time for the possession of narcotics. After her prison sentence had ended, she began working "for a non-profit that provided legal assistance to inmates."

== Mapp v. Ohio ==
In May 1957, there was a bombing at the home of Don King, who was then running an illegal gambling operation and later became a boxing promoter. Police received a tip about the bombing, leading them to the home of Dollree Mapp. The police "showed up at Mapp's place, demanding to be let in." Mapp refused and was advised by her lawyer to request a search warrant. The police left and returned in approximately three hours, forcing their way into her house by breaking the door. The police would not show Mapp the search warrant, causing Mapp to believe the warrant was blank. She took the warrant and put it in her blouse so the police would not take it. However, one of the officers “went down anyway,” and took the paper from Mapp. The officer found evidence of pornography in Mapp's house. As a result, Mapp was "charged under an Ohio law that made possession of obscene material a felony." Mapp was sentenced with seven years in prison.

While on bond, however, she appealed to the Ohio Supreme Court, which rejected her case. She then appealed to the U.S Supreme Court "on the basis of freedom of expression" and they accepted her case. The Supreme Court Justices all "drew laughs from the courtroom gallery while leaving no doubt how absurd they found Ohio’s obscenity statute." Initially, there was unanimous agreement that the Ohio obscenity law was not in line with the First Amendment. However, when the argument was altered to focus on the Fourth Amendment by Justice Clark, only five justices decided that the evidence taken from Mapp's home, without a search warrant, was "illegally obtained." In addition, the materials the officers had found, Mapp pleaded, were her roommate's obscene materials and commented, saying, "Look at what terrible things men read. Let’s put it away." This case's overarching question was, "Were the confiscated materials protected from seizure by the Fourth Amendment?" As a result of the Mapp opinion, the Supreme Court extended the obtainment of illegal evidence rule to the states. The case was argued on March 29, 1961, and decided on June 19, 1961.

== Exclusionary rule ==
In Mapp v. Ohio, the Supreme Court deemed it unconstitutional to use the evidence of pornography gathered from the police officers when they illegally searched Mapp's house. This ruling was based on the protection from "an unreasonable search or seizure" stated in the Fourth Amendment. However, the exclusionary rule is not cited in the Constitution, but rather a Supreme Court implication. The Supreme Court "found that the Fourteenth Amendment right to due process of law and the Fourth Amendment right against unreasonable searches and seizures could not be properly enforced as long as illegally obtained evidence continued to be presented in court." This realization of the Court is what allowed Mapp and her lawyer to make a "motion to suppress" the evidence. In other words, having the judge determine whether the evidence was gathered legally. In Mapp's case it was not, so the evidence was not included in the trial. In the majority opinion, the Supreme Court "recognized that the purpose of the exclusionary rule "is to deter - to compel respect for the constitutional guaranty in the only effectively available way - by removing the incentive to disregard it." However, the Court makes an effort to say that it is not the exclusionary rule which sets the appellant free, "it is the law that sets him free." In Mapp v. Ohio, when Mapp's conviction was overturned it was due to the fact that the law "gives to the individual no more than that which the Constitution guarantees him." Mapp v. Ohio, Gideon v. Wainwright, and Miranda v. Arizona, were all major cases that had large effects on policing and search warrant requirements thereafter.

== Career ==
Mapp moved to New York after her Supreme Court case. In 1971, Mapp was arrested and sentenced to eight years in prison for the possession of heroin. After serving prison time in the Bedford Hills Correctional Facility for Women, Mapp worked for a non-profit that "provided legal assistance to inmates." She also worked as a seamstress and dressmaker, in addition to other businesses, such as beauty and upholstery. Her niece Carolyn Mapp stated that some of her aunt's businesses "were legitimate, and some of them were whatever they were.” Mapp also spoke at law schools and about her SCOTUS case. Later, in 1987, she was interviewed by a political science professor and the book was later published.

== Later years ==
Mapp was the sole survivor of her immediate relatives after her daughter Barbara died in 2002. It was around this time as well that Mapp began to show the beginning signs of dementia. She tried to stay active in her late eighties, but died on October 31, 2014, in Conyers, Georgia, at the age of 91. Her great-niece Tiffany recalled, “My great aunt was very, very, very strong-willed,” adding: “She didn’t prepare for death. I think Aunt Dolly thought she was going to live forever.”

== Personal life ==
Dollree Mapp was born on October 30, 1923 in Forest, Mississippi. She was one of seven children and the daughter of a cattleman and schoolteacher. When Mapp was 10 years old, she left her family to live in Cleveland with her aunt. Five years later, Mapp was pregnant and gave birth to her daughter Barbara Bivins by Jimmy Bivins, a boxer whom she soon married. However, Mapp "accused Bivins of beating her, and they were soon divorced." She said, “I had to leave him or kill him, and I wasn’t ready to kill him.” Later, Mapp was engaged to boxer Archie Moore, but he called off the wedding, in which case, Mapp "sued him for breach of promise." The case involved allegations of sexual abuse and made headlines around the country; as a result, Mapp was a local celebrity in the African-American community in Cleveland, and her doings were reported in the society and gossip columns of Cleveland's popular African-American newspaper, the Cleveland Call & Post. Mapp had been in New York since her marriage to Bivins, but decided to move back to Cleveland (at 30 years old) with her daughter after the break up with Moore. She stayed close to the boxing world, and that is how she came into contact with her neighbor Don King, whose home had allegedly been bombed by the man the police were searching for the night they came to Mapp's house. After Mapp's case was appealed by the Supreme Court, she moved to Queens where she was arrested for possession of heroin and stolen property. "Mapp worked on issues related to prisoners’ rights and sought to reduce long mandatory sentences for drug offenses," which she continued later in her life after she was released from prison in 1981" when New York Governor Hugh Carey commuted her sentence. She kept working for inmates through her employment at a non-profit, which gave aid to inmates and gave her a platform to speak about her court experience.
