= Gouled v. United States =

- Supreme Court of the United States

Argued January 4, 1921 Decided February 28, 1921
- Full case name: Gouled v. United States
- Citations: 255 U.S. 298 (more)

Case history
- Subsequent: Conviction reversed; new trial ordered, Gouled v. United States, 273 F. 2d 506

Holding
- It is a violation of the Fourth Amendment to seize evidence through social trickery or stealth. It is a violation of a defendant's Fifth Amendment right against self-incrimination to admit evidence obtained in such manner. The government may not seize evidence that is not contraband, stolen, or a tool of the crime.

Court membership
- Chief Justice Edward D. White Associate Justices Joseph McKenna · Oliver W. Holmes Jr. William R. Day · Willis Van Devanter; Mahlon Pitney · James C. McReynolds; Louis Brandeis · John H. Clarke

Case opinion
- Majority: Clarke, joined by unanimous

Laws applied
- U.S. Const. amend. IV, U.S. Const. amend. V
- Overruled by
- Warden v. Hayden

Gouled v. United States, 255 U.S. 298 (1921), was a United States Supreme Court case in which the court unanimously held that the government may not seize evidence by use of stealth or social trickery.

The case expanded on Boyd v. United States to establish the now-defunct mere evidence rule, which stated that the government may not seize property solely useful as evidence.

== Background ==
In 1918, Felix Gouled, among others, was charged with attempting to defraud the United States.

Prior to the arrest, Cohen, a friend of Gouled, was sent by his superiors with the supposed purpose of making a friendly call. After he was left alone within Gouled's office, he searched for evidentiary papers and removed them without a warrant.

The gathered papers were presented at trial, which resulted in a conviction. Upon review, the Second Circuit certified six questions to the Supreme Court regarding the nature of the Fourth Amendment and the Fifth Amendment.

== Decision of the court ==
The court unanimously held that the act of seizing evidence by social trickery or stealth for use in a trial violated the Fourth and Fifth Amendments.

In its decision, the court expanded on the Boyd ruling to declare it unconstitutional for the government to seize evidence from a defendant unless that evidence is contraband, stolen, or a tool of the crime. Additionally, it stated that when such evidence is seized, it must be suppressed at trial.

== Subsequent Developments ==
Despite the simplicity of the original rule, the applicability of the exceptions to any given circumstance proved challenging. This was compounded by the incorporation of the Fourth Amendment, which brought the problem of applying the rule and its exceptions to the States. As a result of the inconsistencies of application in subsequent cases, the court rejected the rule in the 1967 case of Warden v. Hayden.
