= Trupiano =

Trupiano is a surname. Notable people with the surname include:

- Jerry Trupiano (born 1947), American radio sportscaster
- Matthew Trupiano (1938–1997), American mob boss

== See also ==
- Trupiano v. United States, a United States Supreme Court case
