= Warden v. Hayden =

- Supreme Court of the United States

Argued April 12, 1967 Decided May 29, 1967
- Full case name: Warden, Maryland Penitentiary v. Hayden
- Citations: 387 U.S. 294 (more) 87 S. Ct. 1642; 18 L. Ed. 2d 782

Case history
- Prior: Defendant convicted; conviction reversed on appeal, Hayden v. Warden, 363 F.2d 647 (4th Cir. 1966); cert. granted, 385 U.S. 926 (1966).
- Subsequent: Conviction upheld

Holding
- The distinction prohibiting seizure of items of only evidential value and allowing seizure of instrumentalities, fruits, or contraband is no longer accepted as being required by the Fourth Amendment

Court membership
- Chief Justice Earl Warren Associate Justices Hugo Black · William O. Douglas; Tom C. Clark · John M. Harlan II; William J. Brennan Jr. · Potter Stewart; Byron White · Abe Fortas

Case opinions
- Majority: Brennan, joined by Clark, Harlan, Stewart, White
- Concurrence: Black
- Concurrence: Fortas, joined by Warren
- Dissent: Douglas

Laws applied
- U.S. Const. amend. IV
- This case overturned a previous ruling or rulings
- Gouled v. United States (1921)

Warden v. Hayden, 387 U.S. 294 (1967), was a United States Supreme Court case that held that 'mere evidence' may be seized and held as evidence in a trial, allowing such evidence obtained in a search to be used. This finding reversed previous Supreme Court decisions such as Boyd v. United States which had held that search warrants "may not be used as a means of gaining access to a man's house or office and papers solely for the purpose of making search to secure evidence to be used against him in a criminal or penal proceeding".

== Background of the case ==
In the morning of March 17, 1962, an armed man robbed the Diamond Cab Company in Baltimore, Maryland. Two cab drivers followed the man to a house and relayed the information to the police, who arrived quickly. After the police knocked on the door and announced that they were searching for a robber seen entering the house, Mrs. Hayden consented to the search. A search of the premises revealed a gun and clothing, found in a washing machine, that matched the description of the armed man that had been reported by the cab company. Weapons were found in a bathroom that matched the description of those used by the robber. Ammunition for the shotgun was found in Mr. Hayden's chest of drawers and ammunition for the handgun under his mattress.

Hayden was convicted at a bench trial. During appeals, courts held that the search of the house was valid; the search for weapons that were used in the crime, or could be used against the police was also valid. However, the appellate court held that the clothing was of 'mere evidential' nature, not in plain sight, and this was not properly seized. The police had been in hot pursuit of the robber, and thus were exempt from needing a warrant to search the house. However, under the rules at that time, seizing evidence such as the clothing that fit the description of the fleeing robber would not have been allowed. Suppressing the improperly seized evidence would lead to a new trial under the principle of the fruit of the poisonous tree.

== See also ==
- List of United States Supreme Court cases, volume 387
- Fruit of the poisonous tree
- Mere evidence rule
