= Wolf v. Colorado =

- Supreme Court of the United States

Argued October 19, 1948 Decided June 27, 1949
- Full case name: Julius A. Wolf v. State of Colorado
- Citations: 338 U.S. 25 (more) 69 S. Ct. 1359; 93 L. Ed. 1782; 1949 U.S. LEXIS 2079

Case history
- Prior: Defendant convicted, District Court of the City and County of Denver, Colorado; affirmed, 187 P.2d 926 (Colo. 1947); rehearing denied, Supreme Court of Colorado, December 8, 1947; defendant convicted in separate trial, District Court of the City and County of Denver, Colorado; affirmed, 117 Colo. 321 (Colo. 1947); cert. granted, 333 U.S. 879 (1948)
- Subsequent: None

Holding
- The Fourteenth Amendment does not require that evidence obtained in violation of the Fourth Amendment be excluded from use by the states in criminal prosecutions.

Court membership
- Chief Justice Fred M. Vinson Associate Justices Hugo Black · Stanley F. Reed; Felix Frankfurter · William O. Douglas; Frank Murphy · Robert H. Jackson; Wiley B. Rutledge · Harold H. Burton

Case opinions
- Majority: Frankfurter, joined by Vinson, Reed, Jackson, Burton
- Concurrence: Black
- Dissent: Douglas
- Dissent: Murphy, joined by Rutledge
- Dissent: Rutledge, joined by Murphy

Laws applied
- U.S. Const. amends. IV, XIV
- Overruled by
- Mapp v. Ohio, 367 U.S. 643 (1961)

Wolf v. Colorado, 338 U.S. 25 (1949), was a United States Supreme Court case in which the Court held 6-3 that, while the Fourth Amendment was applicable to the states, the exclusionary rule was not a necessary ingredient of the Fourth Amendment's right against warrantless and unreasonable searches and seizures. In Weeks v. United States, 232 U.S. 383 (1914), the Court held that as a matter of judicial implication the exclusionary rule was enforceable in federal courts but not derived from the explicit requirements of the Fourth Amendment. The Wolf Court decided not to incorporate the exclusionary rule as part of the Fourteenth Amendment in large part because the states which had rejected the Weeks Doctrine (the exclusionary rule) had not left the right to privacy without other means of protection (i.e. the States had their own rules to deter police officers from conducting warrantless and unreasonable searches and seizures). However, because most of the states' rules proved to be ineffective in deterrence, the Court overruled Wolf in Mapp v. Ohio, 367 U.S. 643 (1961). That landmark case made history as the exclusionary rule enforceable against the states through the Due Process clause of the Fourteenth Amendment to the same extent that it applied against the federal government.

== Background of the case ==
The appellant, Julius A. Wolf, was convicted in the District Court of the City and County of Denver of conspiracy to perform criminal abortions. On appeal, the convictions were affirmed by the Supreme Court of Colorado (187 P.2d 926, 928). Wolf appealed the conviction by a writ of certiorari and the U.S. Supreme Court decided to hear the appeal.

== Court's decision ==
The essential question presented before the Court was whether states are required by the Fourth and the Fourteenth Amendments to the United States Constitution to exclude illegally seized evidence from trial.

Associate Justice Felix Frankfurter delivered the opinion of the court in this case, in which Chief Justice Fred M. Vinson and Associate Justices Stanley Forman Reed, Robert H. Jackson, and Harold Hitz Burton joined. Associate Justice Hugo Black wrote a separate concurring opinion.

Writing dissenting opinions were Associate Justices William O. Douglas, Frank Murphy (in whose opinion Justice Rutledge joined), and Wiley Blount Rutledge (in whose opinion Justice Murphy joined).

=== Frankfurter's opinion for the majority ===
In its 6-to-3 decision, the Court affirmed the decision of the lower courts. It stated that although exclusion of evidence is indeed an effective way of discouraging and preventing unreasonable searches, there exist other methods that can achieve the same effect while complying with the minimal standards set by the Due Process Clause. As an example, the Court suggested civil remedies, such as "the internal discipline of the police, under the eyes of an alert public opinion."

The main question Justice Felix Frankfurter considers in his opinion is whether a conviction by a state court that arises out of use of evidence that would not have been admitted in a federal court of law denies the defendant due process of law guaranteed by the Fourteenth Amendment.

This question relates directly to the issue of incorporation of the Bill of Rights. Frankfurter states that unlike the requirements regarding administration of criminal justice by federal authority imposed by the Bill of Rights (Amendments I to VIII), the Fourteenth Amendment does not impose similar limitations upon states. He cites the notion that due process guaranteed by the Fourteenth Amendment is shorthand for the first eight amendments of the Constitution, and flatly rejects it, commenting that "the issue is closed."

In considering the restrictions which the Due Process Clause imposes upon states in regards to enforcement of criminal law, the Court does not stray far from the views expressed in Palko v. Connecticut, 302 U.S. 319 (1937). In that decision, Associate Justice Benjamin N. Cardozo rejected the notion that the Due Process Clause incorporates the original Bill of Rights.

The Court does go on to find, through its selective incorporation doctrine, that the Fourth Amendment's proscription of unreasonable searches and seizures is "implicit in the concept of ordered liberty, and as such enforceable against the States through the Due Process Clause." However, enforcement of this basic right raises further questions, e.g., how to check such police conduct, what remedies are appropriate against it, and so forth.

The important precedent relevant in this case arises from Weeks v. United States, (1914). The main consequence of the unanimous ruling in Weeks was that in a federal prosecution, the Fourth Amendment prohibited the use of evidence obtained by an illegal search and seizure. Frankfurter notes, with apparent disapproval, that this 1914 ruling "was not derived from the explicit requirements of the Fourth Amendment," nor "based on legislation expressing Congressional policy in the enforcement of the Constitution." However, because the rule has been frequently applied since, "we stoutly adhere to it."

However, Frankfurter reaffirms, the immediate question at hand is whether this basic right to protection against arbitrary intrusion by the police in a federal case extends to state cases as well. He writes that because most of the English-speaking world "does not regard as vital … the exclusion of evidence such obtained," the Court must hesitate "to treat this remedy as an essential ingredient of the right."

Frankfurter writes that although the practice of exclusion of evidence is indeed an efficient way of deterring unlawful searches, the Court cannot condemn other equally effective methods as falling below the minimal standards required by the Due Process Clause. Further, there exist reasons for excluding evidence obtained by the federal police that are less compelling in the case of state or local authority.

He concludes that because of the above reasons, the Court holds that "in a prosecution in a State Court for a State crime, the Fourteenth Amendment does not forbid the admission of evidence obtained by an unreasonable search and seizure."

=== Black's concurrence ===
In a concurring opinion, Associate Justice Hugo L. Black notes that as per his previous dissents, he agrees that the Fourth Amendment's prohibition of unreasonable searches and seizure is enforceable against the states. He writes that he would be in favor of the reversal of the decision of the lower courts if he thought that the Fourth Amendment, by itself, barred not only unreasonable searches and seizures, but also the use of evidence so obtained. However, he agrees with the implication evident from the Court's opinion in that the federal exclusionary rule is "not a command of the Fourth Amendment but is a judicially created rule of evidence which Congress might negate." He concludes that this implication leads him "to concur in the Court's judgment of affirmance."

=== Douglas' dissent ===
Associate Justice William O. Douglas writes in his dissenting opinion that for the reasons stated by Justice Hugo L. Black in his dissent in Adamson v. California, he believes that the Fourth Amendment is applicable to the States. He agrees with Justice Frank Murphy's assertion that evidence obtained in violation of the Fourth Amendment must be excluded in state as well as in federal prosecutions; in absence of such exclusion, "the Amendment would have no effective sanction."

=== Murphy's dissent ===
In his dissent opinion, with which Justice Wiley Blount Rutledge concurs, Associate Justice Frank Murphy takes issue with the majority opinion's suggestion that there exist alternatives to the exclusionary rule. He complains that this very statement "conveys the impression that one possibility is as effective as the next," while, in his opinion, there is only one alternative to the rule of exclusion – and that is "no sanction at all."

Murphy openly questions the Court's suggestion of self-regulation, scoffing at the notion of expecting "a District Attorney to prosecute himself…for well-meaning violations of the search and seizure clause during a raid the District Attorney…[has] ordered." Murphy suggests another alternative, somewhat parenthetically, whereas a trespass action for damages could be used as "a venerable means of securing reparation for unauthorized invasion of the home."

=== Rutledge's dissent ===
Associate Justice Wiley Blount Rutledge writes a dissenting opinion, with which Justice Frank Murphy concurs. He rejects the Court's conclusion that the mandate of the Fourth Amendment, though binding on the states, does not carry with it the sanction of the exclusionary rule. He agrees with Justice Murphy's assertion that the "Amendment without the sanction is a dead letter."

He also rejects the Court's suggestion that Congress could genuinely enact legislation that would permit the use in federal courts of evidence seized in violation of the Fourth Amendment, noting that this issue had previously – and negatively – been settled in Boyd v. United States.

Justice Rutledge concludes by saying that the Court makes "the illegality of this search and seizure its inarticulate premise of decision." He concurs with this premise, and believes that the conviction should be reversed.

== See also ==
- Palko v. Connecticut
