= Mere evidence rule =

Legal rule of evidence (United States)

In the law of the United States, the mere evidence rule was a historical doctrine that defined the scope of the 4th Amendment to the United States Constitution. The rule was first elucidated in the Supreme Court case of Boyd v. United States.

In Boyd, the Court ruled that a statute that compelled the production of documents, as part of an investigation into the payment of duties, was a violation of the 4th and 5th Amendments. The Court reasoned that the defendant had a superior property right in the papers and that compelling their production as evidence was self-incrimination. The mere evidence rule was solidified in the case of Gouled v. United States, which found that the 4th Amendment only allowed search and seizure of instrumentalities, fruits of the crime, and contraband, but not mere evidence.

A series of cases chipped away at the rule, distinguishing its scope, culminating in the case of Warden, Maryland Penitentiary v. Hayden in which the Supreme Court rejected the rule, saying the it was antiquated and fraught with exceptions. The abandonment of the rule has, however, been criticized; some argue that the rejection of the rule's limitation on searches has led to more intrusive paper searches and less protection for third parties.

== Origins ==
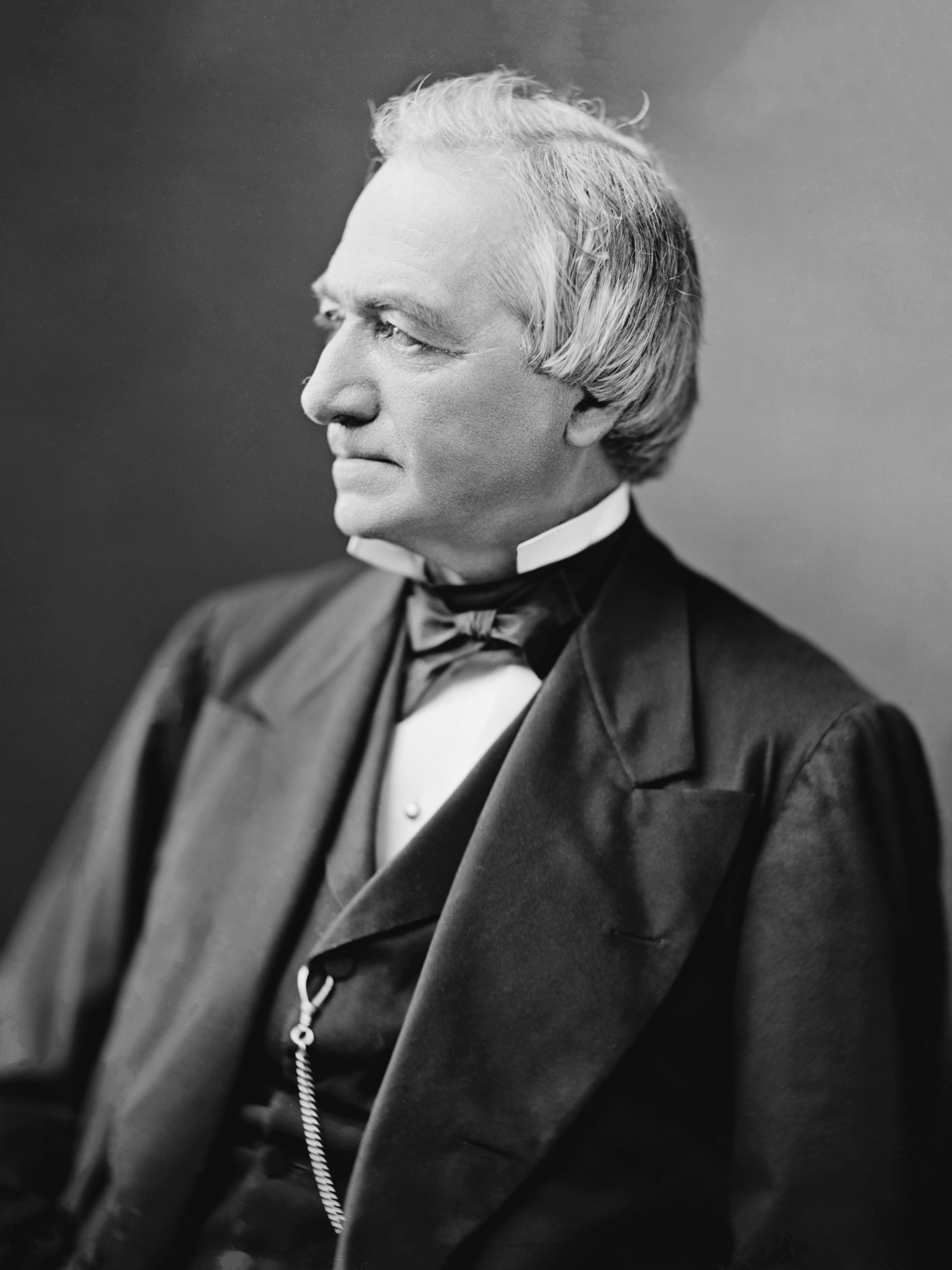
Justice Bradley laid the foundation for the mere evidence rule with a broad interpretation of the 4th Amendment in Boyd v. United States.

The mere evidence rule was drawn from the opinion of the United States Supreme Court in the case Boyd v. United States. In Boyd, the Court ruled that a statute that compelled the production of documents as part of an investigation into the payment of duties was a violation of the Fourth and Fifth Amendments. The Court reasoned that the defendant had a superior property right in the papers, and that compelling their production as evidence was compelled self-incrimination.

The mere evidence rule was solidified in the case Gouled v. United States. In Gouled, the Court found a Fourth Amendment violation when a warrant was used to obtain the defendant's documents that were later used at trial. Gouled also suggested that more than just papers were categorically protected by the Fourth Amendment. This led to the classic articulation of the mere evidence rule, which stated that the Fourth Amendment allowed only search and seizure of instrumentalities, fruits of the crime, and contraband, and that mere evidence could not be searched or seized.

The mere evidence rule has been praised as a valuable protection of individual privacy. For instance, in United States v. Poller, Judge Learned Hand observed that "limitations upon the fruit to be gathered tend to limit the quest itself."

== Demise ==
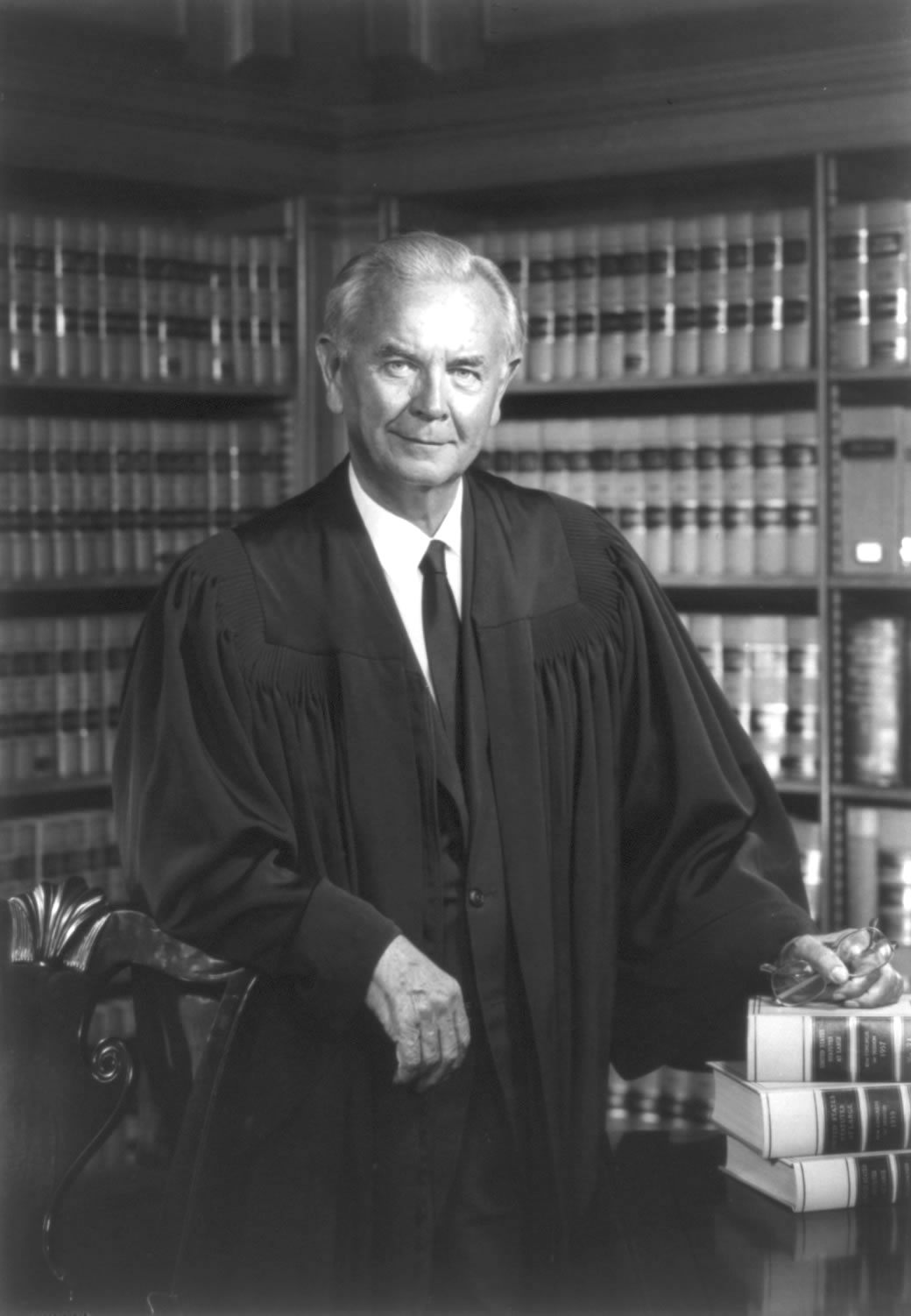
Justice Brennan rejected the mere evidence rule in Warden, Maryland Penitentiary v. Hayden.

By the beginning of the twentieth century the mere evidence rule was facing criticism. Approval of government regulation of property was eroding the traditional sanctity of property rights, the conception of the Fourth Amendment as a right to privacy was gaining support, and the government was becoming dissatisfied with the obstruction of criminal investigations that strict adherence to the rule engendered. In Hale v. Henkel, the Supreme Court held that the mere evidence rule did not apply to corporations. In Shapiro v. United States, the Court held that the mere evidence rule did not prohibit searches, seizures, or admission of records that the individual was legally required to keep. In Marron v. United States, the Court expanded the definition of "instrumentalities" to broadly reach property used in the commission of a crime.

The real dismantling of the mere evidence rule began with Schmerber v. California, where the court did not rely on the mere evidence rule to determine if a blood test was prohibited by the Fourth Amendment. Instead, the Court distinguished between physical evidence, which could be reasonably searched and seized, and testimonial evidence, which could not. Finally, in Warden, Maryland Penitentiary v. Hayden, the Supreme Court rejected the mere evidence rule. Relying instead on the distinction between physical and testimonial evidence, the Court criticized the mere evidence as antiquated and fraught with exceptions. The Court embraced the 4th Amendment as a protector of a right to privacy. The Court recognized that while the rejection of the mere evidence rule may "enlarge the area of permissible searches," the protections of the 4th Amendment, like the reasonableness and warrant requirements, would sufficiently safeguard the right to privacy.

The abandonment of the mere evidence rule has been criticized. Professor Russell W. Galloway argued that the rule was a rational limitation on searches, and that its rejection paved the way for more intrusive paper searches and less protection for third parties.
