= Prophylactic rule =

Legal rule which overprotects a constitutional right

A prophylactic rule is a judicially crafted rule that protects a constitutional right, by providing consequences for violations of that right, in order to safeguard that constitutional right or improve detection of violations of that right.

In United States law, an example is the case of Miranda v. Arizona, which adopted a prophylactic rule ("Miranda warnings") to protect the Fifth Amendment right against self-incrimination. The exclusionary rule, which restricts admissibility of evidence in court, is also sometimes considered to be a prophylactic rule. The notion of prophylactic rules is controversial. U.S. Supreme Court Justices Antonin Scalia and Clarence Thomas have argued against them, writing that the ability of judges to create these rules "is an immense and frightening antidemocratic power, and it does not exist."

== See also ==
- Implied powers
- Judicial activism
