= United States v. Rabinowitz =

- Supreme Court of the United States

Argued January 11, 1950 Decided February 20, 1950
- Full case name: United States v. Rabinowitz
- Citations: 339 U.S. 56 (more) 70 S. Ct. 430; 94 L. Ed. 2d 653

Holding
- A warrantless search of a surrounding area incident to a lawful arrest is constitutional and not unreasonable under the Fourth Amendment.

Court membership
- Chief Justice Fred M. Vinson Associate Justices Hugo Black · Stanley F. Reed; Felix Frankfurter · William O. Douglas; Robert H. Jackson · Harold H. Burton; Tom C. Clark · Sherman Minton

Case opinions
- Majority: Minton, joined by Vinson, Reed, Burton, Clark
- Dissent: Black
- Dissent: Frankfurter, joined by Jackson
- Douglas took no part in the consideration or decision of the case.

Laws applied
- U.S. Const. amend. IV
- This case overturned a previous ruling or rulings
- Trupiano v. United States (1948)

United States v. Rabinowitz, 339 U.S. 56 (1950), was a United States Supreme Court case which the Court held that warrantless searches immediately following an arrest are constitutional. The decision overturned Trupiano v. United States (1948), which had banned such searches.

== Background ==
Albert J. Rabinowitz was arrested in his office on February 16, 1943, for selling forged U.S. postage stamps to an undercover federal officer. Federal agents then conducted a warrantless 90 min search of the office, finding an additional 573 forged stamps. Rabinowitz unsuccessfully moved to exclude this evidence from his subsequent trial, but the motion was denied. He was convicted, but the appellate court reversed the verdict and ruled his rights under the Fourth Amendment had been violated.

== Opinion of the Court ==
The US Supreme Court reversed the Appeals Court ruling in a 5–3 decision. Writing for the majority, Justice Sherman Minton wrote that only "unreasonable" searches were banned under the Fourth Amendment; searching the office of a suspected forger at the site of his lawful arrest was held to be reasonable.
