= Silverman v. United States =

- Supreme Court of the United States

Argued December 5, 1960 Decided March 6, 1961
- Full case name: Silverman v. United States
- Citations: 365 U.S. 505 (more) 81 S. Ct. 679; 5 L. Ed. 2d 734; 1961 U.S. LEXIS 1605; 97 A.L.R.2d 1277

Case history
- Prior: Certiorari to the U.S. Court of Appeals for the District of Columbia Circuit.

Holding
- A federal officer may not, without warrant, physically entrench into a person's office or home to secretly observe or listen and relate at the man's subsequent criminal trial what was seen or heard.

Court membership
- Chief Justice Earl Warren Associate Justices Hugo Black · Felix Frankfurter; William O. Douglas · Tom C. Clark; John M. Harlan II · William J. Brennan Jr. Charles E. Whittaker · Potter Stewart

Case opinions
- Majority: Stewart, joined unanimously
- Concurrence: Douglas
- Concurrence: Clark, joined by Whittaker

Laws applied
- U.S. Const. amend. IV

Silverman v. United States, 365 U.S. 505 (1961), is a United States Supreme Court case in which the Court unanimously held that a federal officer may not, without warrant, physically place themselves into the space of a person's office or home to secretly observe or listen and relate at the man's subsequent criminal trial what was seen or heard.

== See also ==
- Fourth Amendment to the United States Constitution
