= Bunning v Cross =

Judgement of the High Court of Australia

- Court: High Court of Australia
- Decided: 14 June 1978
- Citation: [1978] HCA 22 (1978) 141 CLR 54

Case history
- Subsequent action: none

Court membership
- Judges sitting: Barwick CJ, Stephen, Jacobs, Murphy & Aickin JJ

Case opinions
- Improperly or illegally obtained does not inherently render it inadmissible; however, it confers upon a judge a discretion to reject it (3:2) (per Barwick CJ, Stephen and Aickin JJ; Jacobs and Murphy JJ dissenting).

Keywords
- Admissibility of evidence, improperly or illegally obtained evidence

Bunning v Cross [1978] HCA 22, 141 CLR 54 (HCA), is an Australian evidence law case, in which the admissibility of improperly gained evidence is examined. Like the similar R v Ireland (1970) 126 CLR 321, Bunning v Cross, the ruling of the High Court of Australia has been formulated as an exclusionary rule, namely the onus is on the accused to prove the misconduct and justify exclusion, and is known as the Bunning discretion (cf. Ireland discretion).

== Facts ==
Mr. Bunning was charged under s. 63 (1) of the Road Traffic Act, 1974 with having driven a car "whilst under the influence of alcohol to such an extent as to be incapable of having proper control of it". Burton SM dismissed the charge, holding that the evidence of the result of a breathalyzer test was inadmissible because the police officer's requirement that the applicant undergo the test was unlawful.

The respondent (i.e., Cross, the prosecutor) sought and obtained an order to review from the Supreme Court of Western Australia under the Justices Act 1902 (WA), as amended. The relevant provisions (ss. 197, 198, 205, 206, 206A and 206F) are set out in the judgment of the Chief Justice. Jones J heard the return to the order and decided that the evidence was admissible but that, in the circumstances, the magistrate was entitled in his discretion to admit or to reject it. Jones J declined to direct that the evidence should be admitted, but expressed the view that, if he were to decide the question for himself, he would admit it. He then made an order directing the magistrate to rehear the case and to determine it "in accordance with this judgment and according to law". This can only mean (and s. 206F makes this clear) that the magistrate was bound to follow Jones J's directions.

Burton SM reheard the case, treated the evidence of the breathalyzer test as admissible, and, in his discretion, rejected the evidence. He then dismissed the charge for the second time.

The respondent sought and obtained another order to review on the ground that the magistrate had not properly exercised his discretion. The Full Court (Lavan and Brinsden JJ, Burt CJ dissenting) held that the discretion was not properly exercised. Burt CJ held that the magistrate took into account all relevant matters. Lavan J took the view that Mr. Burton had not taken into account all relevant considerations and directed that he should reconsider the exercise of discretion. Brinsden J considered that the magistrate was bound to admit the evidence and thought the result should be a conviction. None of the justices of the Full Court was willing to exercise the discretion to admit or exclude the evidence, and none was willing that the Full Court should convict (although urged to do so by the respondent). They also refrained from directing the magistrate to convict.

== Judgment ==
=== Majority opinion ===
Barwick CJ authored a concurring opinion, and Stephen and Aickin JJ co-authored a concurring opinion. The majority ruled for the applicant, the prosecutor, and ordered the case to be remitted to the magistrate, who was directed to convict the respondent and impose upon the respondent an appropriate penalty.

=== Dissenting opinion ===
Jacobs and Murphy JJ both authored individual dissenting opinions.
