= Mapp v. Ohio =

1961 US Supreme Court ruling

- Supreme Court of the United States

Argued March 29, 1961 Decided June 18, 1961
- Full case name: Dollree Mapp, et al. v. State of Ohio
- Citations: 367 U.S. 643 (more) 81 S. Ct. 1684; 6 L. Ed. 2d 1081; 1961 U.S. LEXIS 812; 86 Ohio L. Abs. 513; 16 Ohio Op. 2d 384; 84 A.L.R.2d 933
- Argument: Oral argument

Case history
- Prior: Defendant convicted, Cuyahoga County, Ohio Court of Common Pleas; affirmed, Ohio Court of Appeals; affirmed, Ohio Supreme Court 166 N.E.2d 387 (Ohio 1960)
- Subsequent: Rehearing denied, 368 U.S. 871 (1961).

Questions presented
- Were the confiscated materials protected from seizure by the Fourth Amendment?

Holding
- The Fourth Amendment prohibition against unreasonable searches and seizures, as applied to the states through the Fourteenth, excludes unconstitutionally obtained evidence from use in criminal prosecutions. Ohio Supreme Court reversed.

Court membership
- Chief Justice Earl Warren Associate Justices Hugo Black · Felix Frankfurter; William O. Douglas · Tom C. Clark; John M. Harlan II · William J. Brennan Jr. Charles E. Whittaker · Potter Stewart

Case opinions
- Majority: Clark, joined by Warren, Black, Douglas, Brennan
- Concurrence: Black
- Concurrence: Stewart
- Dissent: Harlan, joined by Frankfurter, Whittaker

Laws applied
- U.S. Const. amends. IV, XIV
- This case overturned a previous ruling or rulings
- Wolf v. Colorado (1949)

Mapp v. Ohio, 367 U.S. 643 (1961), is a landmark U.S. Supreme Court decision in which the Court ruled that the exclusionary rule, which prevents a prosecutor from using evidence that was obtained by violating the Fourth Amendment to the U.S. Constitution, also applies to the states.

The Supreme Court accomplished this by use of a principle known as selective incorporation. In Mapp, this involved the incorporation of the provisions, as interpreted by the Court, of the Fourth Amendment (which applies only to actions of the federal government) into the Fourteenth Amendment's Due Process Clause. On the matter of warrantless searches, the court cited Boyd v. United States and ruled, "It is not the breaking of his doors, and the rummaging of his drawers, that constitutes the essence of the offense; but it is the invasion of his indefeasible right of personal security, personal liberty, and private property."

== Legal background ==
The Fourth Amendment to the U.S. Constitution provides: "The right of the people to be secure in their persons, houses, papers, and effects, against unreasonable searches and seizures, shall not be violated...." Until the early 20th century, Americans' only legal remedy in cases where law enforcement officers violated the Fourth Amendment was to sue the officers involved, either for trespassing to recover damages or via the replevin tort to recover their seized goods or property. This changed in 1914 when the U.S. Supreme Court unanimously ruled in Weeks v. United States that any evidence obtained by federal law enforcement officers in violation of the Fourth Amendment could not be used in federal criminal proceedings.

Over the next several decades, American courts generally held that this "exclusionary rule" only applied to cases in which federal law enforcement officers, not state officers, were involved in illegal searches and seizures. In 1949, the Supreme Court confronted the issue of the exclusionary rule's application to states in Wolf v. Colorado. The Wolf Court found that although 17 states had adopted the exclusionary rule from Weeks in their state law, 30 others had rejected it. The Court therefore concluded that it was not a "departure from basic standards" of due process to allow states to introduce illegally obtained evidence in state trials.

For the next 12 years, the Supreme Court only applied the exclusionary rule to evidence obtained by state officers for use in state court prosecutions when the state officers used coercion, violence, or brutality. For example, in the 1952 case Rochin v. California, the Court required a California state court to exclude evidence that state officers had illegally obtained, but only because the officers had used "conduct that shocks the conscience".

== Case history ==
Dollree "Dolly" Mapp was a young woman in Cleveland, Ohio who in the mid-1950s became involved in the illegal gambling operations of mobster and racketeer Shondor Birns, who dominated organized crime in the city. On May 23, 1957, Cleveland police received an anonymous tip that a suspect named Virgil Ogletree might be found at a house that contained Mapp's apartment, along with illegal betting slips and equipment employed in a "numbers game" set up by Mapp's boyfriend. Ogletree was involved in the Cleveland illegal betting world, centered in the city's Short Vincent neighborhood. Ogletree was wanted for questioning regarding his role in the bombing of the home of rival gambling racketeer Don King (who later became a major boxing promoter). Three policemen went to Mapp's home and asked for permission to enter, but Mapp, after consulting with her lawyer by telephone, refused to admit them without a search warrant. Two officers left, and one remained, watching the house from across the street.

Three hours later, more police officers arrived and knocked on the door. When Mapp did not answer, they forced the door open. Mapp asked to see their search warrant, and was shown a piece of paper, which she snatched away from one of the officers, putting it inside her blouse. The officers struggled with Mapp and recovered the piece of paper, which was not seen by her or her lawyers again, and was not introduced as evidence in any of the ensuing court proceedings. As the search of Mapp's second-floor apartment began, police handcuffed her for being belligerent. The police searched the entire house thoroughly, and discovered Ogletree (who was eventually cleared on the bombing charge) hiding in the apartment of the downstairs tenant. In the search of Mapp's apartment and in a footlocker in the basement of the house, the police found betting slips. They also found a pistol and several pornographic books and pictures, which Mapp said a previous tenant had left behind. The police arrested Mapp, and charged her with a misdemeanor count of possessing numbers-game paraphernalia, but she was acquitted.

Several months later, after Mapp refused to testify against Birns and his associates at their trial for the attempted shakedown of King, she was prosecuted for possession of the pornographic books. Mapp was found guilty at trial of "knowingly having had in her possession and under her control certain lewd and lascivious books, pictures, and photographs in violation of 2905.34 of Ohio's Revised Code," and sentenced to one to seven years in prison. Mapp was convicted, even though prosecutors were unable to produce a valid search warrant. She appealed to the Supreme Court of Ohio, which affirmed her conviction, because even though the search warrant's validity was doubtful and the police's search of her home was illegal, the police officers had not used brutal force against her, and so under the Supreme Court's precedents in Wolf and Rochin, the exclusionary rule did not apply. Mapp then appealed to the U.S. Supreme Court, which agreed to hear her case.

== Decision ==
On June 19, 1961, the Supreme Court issued a 6–3 (Note: Justice Potter Stewart agreed that Mapp's conviction should be reversed, but he did not join the Court's opinion. He issued a short memorandum explaining that he agreed with much of the dissent, but he thought the Ohio statute violated Mapp's right to free expression. He offered no opinion on the constitutional law question of whether the Fourteenth Amendment required applying the exclusionary rule to the States.) decision in favor of Mapp that overturned her conviction, and held that the exclusionary rule applies to state governments as well as to the federal government.

=== Opinion of the Court ===
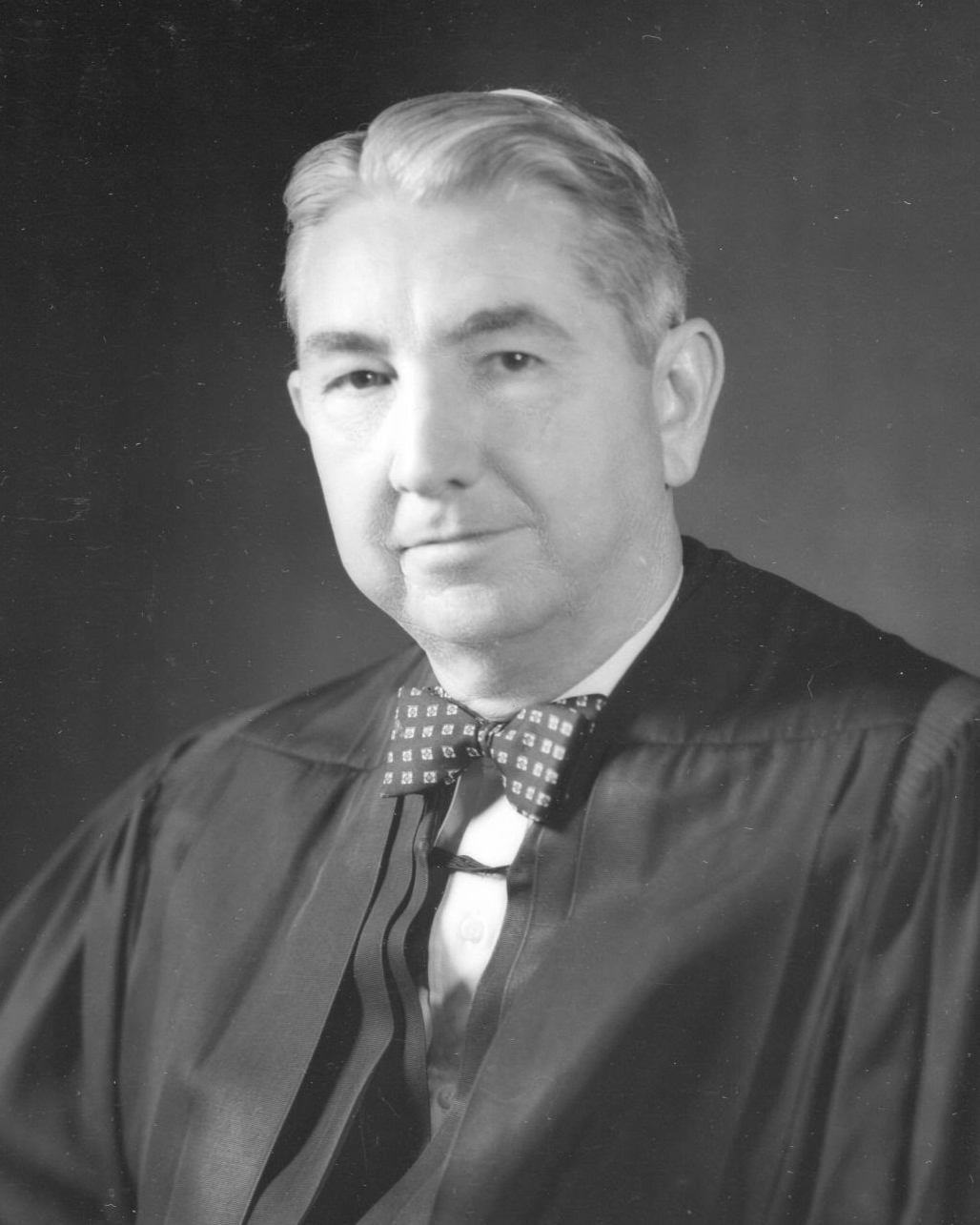
Justice Tom C. Clark, the author of the majority opinion in Mapp.

Five justices joined the majority opinion written by justice Tom C. Clark. The Court observed that of the 30 U.S. states that had rejected the exclusionary rule at the time of Wolf v. Colorado in 1949, more than half had adopted at least a partial form of it in the intervening 12 years. Regarding its statements in Wolf that other preexisting remedies, like private lawsuits and oversight of police forces, would be enough to enforce the Fourth Amendment, the Court said that experience had shown that "such remedies have been worthless and futile."

The Court then overruled Wolf, and held that "all evidence obtained by searches and seizures in violation of the Constitution is, by that same authority, inadmissible in a state court." Justice Clark stated that without the exclusionary rule, the Fourth Amendment's protections against unreasonable searches and seizures would be merely "a form of words" that would be "valueless and undeserving of mention in a perpetual charter of inestimable human liberties." In addition, because prior cases had ruled that the Fourteenth Amendment incorporated the Fourth Amendment against the states, the Court held that this reasoning applied equally to federal and state criminal proceedings. In a frequently quoted passage, the Court wrote:

[O]ur holding that the exclusionary rule is an essential part of both the Fourth and Fourteenth Amendments is not only the logical dictate of prior cases, but it also makes very good sense. There is no war between the Constitution and common sense. Presently, a federal prosecutor may make no use of evidence illegally seized, but a State's attorney across the street may, although he supposedly is operating under the enforceable prohibitions of the same Amendment. Thus, the State, by admitting evidence unlawfully seized, serves to encourage disobedience to the Federal Constitution which it is bound to uphold.

— Mapp, 367 U.S. at 657.

Clark concluded the Court's opinion by reiterating how the "ignoble shortcut" around the Fourth Amendment that Wolf had left open to state law enforcement officers had "tend[ed] to destroy the entire system of constitutional restraints on which the liberties of the people rest," and subsequently reversed the Supreme Court of Ohio's judgment against Dolly Mapp.

=== Concurring opinion ===
Justice Hugo Black joined the majority opinion, but also wrote a concurring opinion in which he stated that although he thought that the Fourth Amendment alone was not enough to justify the exclusionary rule, when the Fourth Amendment's protections were combined with the Fifth Amendment's protection against self-incrimination, a resulting "constitutional basis emerges which not only justifies but actually requires the exclusionary rule."

=== Dissenting opinion ===
Three justices dissented from the Court's decision, and joined an opinion written by Justice John Marshall Harlan II. Harlan wrote that the Court should not have considered the Fourth Amendment issues in the case, because Mapp's conviction and the subsequent arguments at her appeals had focused on the legality of Ohio's anti-pornography laws, and not on the police officers’ warrantless search of her home. Harlan wrote that the Court's decision in Wolf should be upheld per the principle of stare decisis, and that it did not require the entirety of the Fourth Amendment to be enforced against the states, but rather only the "principle of privacy which is at the core of the Fourth Amendment."

== See also ==
- Fruit of the poisonous tree
