= Exclusionary rule =

US legal rule preventing tainted evidence from being used in a court of law

In the United States, the exclusionary rule is a legal rule, based on constitutional law, that prevents evidence collected or analyzed in violation of the defendant's constitutional rights from being used in a court of law. This may be considered an example of a prophylactic rule formulated by the judiciary in order to protect a constitutional right. The exclusionary rule may also, in some circumstances at least, be considered to follow directly from the constitutional language, such as the Fifth Amendment's command that no person "shall be compelled in any criminal case to be a witness against himself" and that no person "shall be deprived of life, liberty or property without due process of law".

The exclusionary rule is grounded in the Fourth Amendment in the Bill of Rights, and it is intended to protect citizens from illegal searches and seizures. The exclusionary rule is also designed to provide a remedy and disincentive for criminal prosecution from prosecutors and police who illegally gather evidence in violation of the Fifth Amendment and its protection against self-incrimination. The exclusionary rule also protects against violations of the Sixth Amendment, which guarantees the right to counsel.

Most states also have their own exclusionary remedies for illegally obtained evidence under their state constitutions or statutes, some of which predate the federal constitutional guarantees against unlawful searches and seizures and compelled self-incrimination.

This rule is occasionally referred to as a legal technicality because it allows defendants a defense that does not address whether the crime was actually committed. In this respect, it is similar to the explicit rule in the Fifth Amendment protecting people from double jeopardy. In strict cases, when an illegal action is used by the police or the prosecution to gain any incriminating result, all evidence whose recovery stemmed from the illegal action—this evidence is known as "fruit of the poisonous tree"—can be thrown out from a jury trial or be grounds for a mistrial if too much information has been irrevocably revealed.

The exclusionary rule applies to all persons within the jurisdiction of the United States regardless of whether they are citizens, immigrants (legal or illegal), or visitors.

== History of the rule ==
Up until the independence of the United States, the courts of England excluded self-incriminating evidence that was provided as a result of official compulsion, regardless of its reliability. In 1769, Lord Chief Justice Mansfield explained as follows:

[I]n civil causes, the court will force parties to produce evidence which may prove against themselves; or leave the refusal to do it (after proper notice) as a strong presumption, to the jury. ... But in a criminal or penal cause, the defendant is never forced to produce any evidence; though he should hold it in his hands, in Court. [emphasis in original]

Lord Mansfield also explained that "If any evidence or confession has been extorted from her, it will be of no prejudice to her on the trial." Additionally, a defendant could sue to suppress and regain possession of at least some types of illegally seized evidence, in a common law action for replevin.

However, in the 1783 case of Ceglinski v. Orr, the English courts declined to suppress evidence obtained by illegal coercion. In the Warickshall case, evidence was gathered as a result of an involuntary confession, and the court held that the evidence (but not the confession itself) could be admitted. It is questionable whether the Warickshall rule became known in the United States before 1789 (when the U.S. Bill of Rights was written), and whether it applied to confessions obtained by both governmental and private parties. In any event, no decision by the Supreme Court of the United States has ever endorsed the Warickshall rule as a constitutional matter.

Generally speaking, English law before 1789 did not provide as strong an exclusionary rule as the one that later developed under the Fourth Amendment to the United States Constitution, regarding unlawful searches and seizures. The Fourth Amendment, after all, was partly a reaction against English law including the general warrant and the writs of assistance.

In the 1886 case of Boyd v. United States, the U.S. Supreme Court addressed compulsory production of business papers, and the Court excluded those papers based on a combination of the Fourth and Fifth Amendments. Boyd was closely limited to its facts, and several years later the Court stated that the Fourth Amendment does not extend to "excluding testimony" about wrongful searches and seizures.

In 1897, the U.S. Supreme Court held, in Bram v. United States, that involuntary confessions are inadmissible as evidence. The Court in Bram did not announce a strong version of the exclusionary rule that would apply uniformly to exclude all evidence gathered in violation of the Bill of Rights, but instead announced a weak version that excluded only self-incriminating testimony that was compelled in violation of the Fifth Amendment. The distinction between testimonial versus other self-incriminating evidence is a matter of continuing debate.

Before a strong version of the exclusionary rule was addressed and adopted by the federal courts, it had already been adopted by at least one state court, namely the Iowa Supreme Court, as that court would later describe:

The genesis of Iowa’s exclusionary rule was a civil case, Reifsnyder v. Lee, 44 Iowa 101 (1876). ... The first application of the exclusionary rule in a criminal context occurred in the Height case, decided in 1902. Height involved a physical exam of the defendant against his will. 117 Iowa at 652, 91 N.W. at 935. This court held that the examination of the defendant violated the due process clause of the Iowa Constitution, as well as article 1, section 8's prohibition of unreasonable searches.

In 1914, the U.S. Supreme Court announced a strong version of the exclusionary rule, in the case of Weeks v. United States, under the Fourth Amendment prohibiting unreasonable searches and seizures. This decision, however, created the rule only on the federal level. The "Weeks rule", which made an exception for cases at the state level, was adopted by numerous states at a time during Prohibition. In adopting the rule, actions by states often reflected attitudes towards Prohibition, which was enacted by adoption of the Eighteenth Amendment and was enforced through the Volstead Act. Concerns about privacy violations also extended to other instances where criminal sanctions were permitted for "victimless" crime, such as illegal gambling or narcotics violations.

In 1920, the U.S. Supreme Court adopted the "fruit of the poisonous tree" doctrine in the case of Silverthorne Lumber Co. v. United States. The Court stated that allowing evidence gathered as an indirect result of an unconstitutional search and seizure "reduces the Fourth Amendment to a form of words".

Wolf v. Colorado 338 U.S. 25 (1949) ruled that states were not required to adopt the exclusionary rule. Despite the ruling, some states adopted the exclusionary rule. In 1955, the Supreme Court of California ruled in People v. Cahan that the exclusionary rule applied for cases in the state of California. By 1960, 22 states had adopted the rule without substantial qualifications: California, Delaware, Florida, Idaho, Illinois, Indiana, Kentucky, Mississippi, Missouri, Montana, North Carolina, Oklahoma, Oregon, Rhode Island, Tennessee, Washington, Texas, West Virginia, Wisconsin, Wyoming. Michigan also had an exclusionary rule, but with limitations for some narcotics and firearms evidence. In Alabama, Maryland, and South Dakota, the exclusionary rule applied in some situations.

It was not until Mapp v. Ohio in 1961 that the exclusionary rule was also held to be binding on the states through the Fourteenth Amendment, which guarantees due process. Up until Mapp, the exclusionary rule had been rejected by most states.

In 2016, Utah v. Strieff dealt with the exclusionary rule and outstanding warrants and was viewed to be generally favorable towards police.

== Scope and limitations of the rule ==
=== Scope ===
The exclusionary rule does not apply in a civil case, in a grand jury proceeding, or in a parole revocation hearing.

The law in force at the time of the police action, not the time of the attempt to introduce the evidence, controls whether the action is illegal for exclusionary rule purposes.

==== Evidence obtained indirectly from illegal activity ====
Under the "fruit of the poisonous tree" doctrine, evidence obtained as an indirect result of illegal state action is also inadmissible. For example, if a defendant is arrested illegally, the government may not use fingerprints taken while the defendant was in custody as evidence. Because police would not have obtained the fingerprints without the illegal arrest, the prints are "fruit of the poisonous tree".

Other examples of evidence inadmissible under this doctrine include:

- Evidence seized during a search, where the probable cause for the search was illegally obtained evidence
- A confession made by the defendant, prompted by the admission of illegally obtained evidence against him
- Evidence derived from information gained in illegal wiretaps

However, the "fruit of the poisonous tree" doctrine does not apply to interrogations made without a Miranda warning. Although a confession obtained in violation of Miranda is inadmissible, evidence obtained based on information in the confession is admissible. For example, if police learn the identity of a witness through a confession that violates Miranda, the government may still use the witness's testimony at trial.

=== Limitations ===
Even in a criminal case, the exclusionary rule does not simply bar the introduction of all evidence obtained in violation of the Fourth, Fifth, or Sixth Amendment. In Hudson v. Michigan, Justice Scalia wrote for the U.S. Supreme Court:

Suppression of evidence, however, has always been our last resort, not our first impulse. The exclusionary rule generates "substantial social costs," United States v. Leon, 468 U.S. 897, 907 (1984), which sometimes include setting the guilty free and the dangerous at large. We have therefore been "cautious against expanding" it, Colorado v. Connelly, 479 U.S. 157, 166 (1986), and "have repeatedly emphasized that the rule's 'costly toll' upon truth-seeking and law enforcement objectives presents a high obstacle for those urging [its] application," Pennsylvania Bd. of Probation and Parole v. Scott, 524 U.S. 357, 364–365 (1998) (citation omitted). We have rejected "indiscriminate application" of the rule, Leon, supra, at 908, and have held it to be applicable only "where its remedial objectives are thought most efficaciously served," United States v. Calandra, 414 U.S. 338, 348 (1974) – that is, "where its deterrence benefits outweigh its 'substantial social costs,'" Scott, supra, at 363, (quoting Leon, supra, at 907). Whether the exclusionary sanction is appropriately imposed in a particular case is an issue separate from the question whether the Fourth Amendment rights of the party seeking to invoke the rule were violated by police conduct.

Limitations on the exclusionary rule have included the following:

- Private search doctrine: Evidence unlawfully obtained from the defendant by a private person is admissible. The exclusionary rule is designed to protect privacy rights, with the Fourth Amendment applying specifically to government officials.
- Standing requirement: Evidence can only be suppressed if the illegal search violated the person's own (the person making the court motion) constitutional rights. The exclusionary rule does not apply to privacy rights of a third party. However, there is a narrow exception to this standing requirement, the jus tertii standing exception.
- Cross-examination: Illegally obtained evidence may be admissible to attack the defendant's credibility on cross-examination, at least where necessary to prevent gamesmanship. For example, where the defendant affirmatively chooses to make a broad statement denying any narcotics activity, he may not use the exclusionary rule as a shield against attacks on his credibility. However, the government also may not attempt to "smuggle in" excluded evidence on cross-examination by asking broad questions.
- Inevitable discovery doctrine: Nix v. Williams held that if the evidence obtained in the unlawful search would almost definitely have been found eventually even without said search, the evidence may be brought forth in court.
- Good faith exception: If police officers acting in good faith (bona fides) rely upon a defective search warrant, then the evidence acquired may still be used under the good-faith exception.
- Independent source doctrine: If police obtain evidence illegally, but also obtain the same evidence through an independent, legal means, the evidence is admissible.
- Knock-and-announce exception: Evidence that police obtain in violation of the requirement to knock and announce themselves before searching a home is admissible.
- Attenuation: If the passage of time or intervening events break the causal relationship between the illegal activity and the evidence, the evidence may still be admissible. Some examples include:
  - If a defendant was illegally arrested, but returns to the police station voluntarily several days later and makes a statement, the statement may be admissible.
  - If a defendant was illegally stopped, but a valid outstanding arrest warrant is later discovered, evidence obtained during the stop may be admissible.
- Formerly, the silver platter doctrine allowed state officials that obtained evidence illegally to turn over evidence to federal officials, and have that evidence be admitted into trial. However, the doctrine was ruled unconstitutional in Elkins v. United States in 1960.

The exclusionary rule is not applicable to non-U.S. nationals residing outside of U.S. borders. In United States v. Alvarez-Machain, the U.S. Supreme Court decided that property owned by aliens in a foreign country is admissible in court. Certain persons in the U.S. receive limited protections, such as prisoners, probationers, parolees, and persons crossing U.S. borders. Corporations, by virtue of being, also have limited rights under the Fourth Amendment (see corporate personhood).

In the case of Florida v. Jimeno, it was found that the evidence found to convict Jimeno, although at first was not admissible, later was found to in fact be admissible since it passed the test of reasonable standards. The defendant consented to a search of his car, and when the officer searched a package and found drugs, it was not said to be in violation because a reasonable person would expect illegal narcotics to be kept in a package or container.

=== Parallel construction ===
The Special Operations Division of the U.S. Drug Enforcement Administration advises DEA agents to follow a process of parallel construction when launching criminal investigations of Americans based on Special Operations Division tips that may be based on warrantless surveillance.

== Criticism and defense ==
The exclusionary rule as it has developed in the United States has been long criticized. Judge Benjamin Cardozo, Chief Judge of the New York Court of Appeals between 1927 and 1932, stated that under the rule, "The criminal is to go free because the constable has blundered." Cardozo noted that many states had rejected the rule, but suggested that the adoption by the federal courts would affect the practice in the sovereign states.

In the 1970s, Dallin H. Oaks, Malcolm Wilkey, and others called for the exclusionary rule to be replaced with a comprehensive judicial remedy against all illegal arrests and searches and seizures (e.g., tort remedy). By the 1980s, the exclusionary rule remained controversial and was strongly opposed by President Ronald Reagan, but some opponents began seeking to have the rule modified, rather than abolished altogether. The Supreme Court case Illinois v. Gates brought the exclusionary rule for reconsideration. The Supreme Court also considered allowing exceptions for errors made by police in good faith. The Reagan administration also asked Congress to ease the rule. It has been proposed that the exclusionary rule be replaced with restitution to victims of police misconduct.

A major criticism of the Fourth Amendment exclusionary rule is that it allegedly defies the original intent of the Constitution. Yale Law Professor Akhil Amar, for example, has argued that "nothing in the text, history, or structure of the Fourth Amendment" supports the rule. Critics like Amar, Oaks and Wilkey point to the fact that the text of the Fourth Amendment does not indicate that illegally seized evidence must be excluded. Some legal historians argue that the Constitution's framers intended only that victims of unreasonable searches or seizures could file civil lawsuits.

In 2009, Roger Roots presented evidence that the idea of exclusion can be found in the earliest set of law books published in American history. In 2014, Roots elaborated that certain eighteenth-century British law books and pamphlets which discuss the exclusion of illegally seized evidence circulated widely in the American colonies and were owned by numerous prominent Framing-era lawyers and statesmen. Also in 2014, Richard Re proposed that the Due Process Clause provides an ample basis for the exclusionary rule.

== See also ==
- Consent search
- Parallel construction
- Herring v. United States (2009 Supreme Court decision about the good-faith exception to the exclusionary rule)
- Sugar bowl (legal maxim)
- Bunning v Cross, an Australian case for which the ruling may be formulated as an exclusionary rule
- Section 24(2) of the Canadian Charter of Rights and Freedoms, a constitutional provision explicitly excluding unconstitutionally obtained evidence if its admission would bring the administration of justice into disrepute
