= Trupiano v. United States =

1948 United States Supreme Court case

- Supreme Court of the United States

Argued March 9, 1948 Decided June 14, 1948
- Full case name: Trupiano v. United States
- Docket no.: 427
- Citations: 334 U.S. 699 (more) 68 S. Ct. 1229; 92 L. Ed. 2d 1663

Court membership
- Chief Justice Fred M. Vinson Associate Justices Hugo Black · Stanley F. Reed; Felix Frankfurter · William O. Douglas; Frank Murphy · Robert H. Jackson; Wiley B. Rutledge · Harold H. Burton

Case opinions
- Majority: Murphy, joined by Frankfurter, Douglas, Jackson, Rutledge
- Dissent: Vinson, joined by Black, Reed, Burton

Laws applied
- Fourth Amendment
- Overruled by
- United States v. Rabinowitz (1950)

Trupiano v. United States, 334 U.S. 699 (1948), was a US Supreme Court decision that ruled that warrantless searches following arrests were unconstitutional under the Fourth Amendment to the United States Constitution.

The case involved a warrantless raid by law enforcement on an illegal distillery, before which law enforcement had had sufficient time to obtain warrants but had chosen not to. After the raid, evidence was seized. In a majority opinion authored by Justice Frank Murphy, the Court ruled that this seizure had been a violation of the Fourth Amendment:

It is a cardinal rule that, in seizing goods and articles, law enforcement agents must secure and use search warrants whenever reasonably practicable. This rule rests upon the desirability of having magistrates rather than police officers determine when searches and seizures are permissible and what limitations should be placed upon such activities.

Trupiano was overturned only two years later in United States v. Rabinowitz (1950), which allowed law enforcement to search and seize evidence at the site of an arrest.
