= Weeks v. United States =

1914 US Supreme Court ruling declaring warrantless seizure unconstitutional

- Supreme Court of the United States

Argued December 2–3, 1913 Decided February 24, 1914
- Full case name: Fremont Weeks v. United States
- Citations: 232 U.S. 383 (more) 34 S. Ct. 341; 58 L. Ed. 652; 1954 U.S. LEXIS 1368

Case history
- Prior: Defendant convicted, W.D. Mo. Error to the District Court of the United States for the Western District of Missouri

Holding
- The warrantless seizure of documents from a private home violated the Fourth Amendment prohibition against unreasonable searches and seizures, and evidence obtained in this manner is excluded from use in federal criminal prosecutions. Western District of Missouri reversed and remanded.

Court membership
- Chief Justice Edward D. White Associate Justices Joseph McKenna · Oliver W. Holmes Jr. William R. Day · Horace H. Lurton; Charles E. Hughes · Willis Van Devanter; Joseph R. Lamar · Mahlon Pitney

Case opinion
- Majority: Day, joined by unanimous

Laws applied
- U.S. Const. amend. IV

Weeks v. United States, 232 U.S. 383 (1914) was a United States Supreme Court case in which the Court unanimously held that the warrantless seizure of items from a private residence constitutes a violation of the Fourth Amendment to the U.S. Constitution. It also prevented local officers from securing evidence by means prohibited under the federal exclusionary rule and giving it to their federal colleagues. It was not until the case of Mapp v. Ohio, 367 U.S. 643 (1961), that the exclusionary rule was deemed to apply to state courts as well.

== Background ==
On December 21, 1911, Fremont Weeks, the plaintiff in error and defendant, was arrested by a police officer at the Union Station in Kansas City, Missouri, where an express company employed him. Weeks was convicted of using the mails for the purpose of transporting lottery tickets, in violation of the Criminal Code. At the time of his arrest, police officers went to Weeks' house to search it. A neighbor told them where to find the key. Officers entered the house of the defendant without a search warrant and took possession of papers and articles, which were turned over to the US marshals. The officers returned later on the same day with the marshal, still without a warrant, and seized letters and envelopes that they found in the drawer of a chiffonier.

Weeks' papers were used to convict Weeks of transporting lottery tickets through the mail, Weeks petitioned against the police for the return of his private possessions.

== Decision ==
The Supreme Court unanimously decided that since there was no warrant, the search was illegal. Therefore, the papers found should have been excluded because of the Fourth Amendment.
