= Fourth Amendment to the United States Constitution =

1791 amendment prohibiting unreasonable searches and seizures

The Bill of Rights in the National Archives

The Fourth Amendment (Amendment IV) to the United States Constitution is part of the Bill of Rights. It prohibits unreasonable searches and seizures and sets requirements for issuing warrants: warrants must be issued by a judge or magistrate, justified by probable cause, supported by oath or affirmation, and must particularly describe the place to be searched and the persons or things to be seized (important or not).

Fourth Amendment case law deals with three main issues: what government activities are "searches" and "seizures", whether a particular search or seizure was unreasonable, and how to address violations of Fourth Amendment rights. Early court decisions limited the amendment's scope to physical intrusion of property or persons, but with Katz v. United States (1967), the Supreme Court held that its protections extend to intrusions on the privacy of individuals as well as to physical locations. A warrant is needed for most search and seizure activities, but the Court has carved out a series of exceptions for consent searches, motor vehicle searches, evidence in plain view, exigent circumstances, border searches, and other situations.

The exclusionary rule is one way the amendment is enforced. Established in Weeks v. United States (1914), this rule holds that evidence obtained as a result of a Fourth Amendment violation is generally inadmissible at criminal trials. Evidence discovered as a later result of an illegal search may also be inadmissible as "fruit of the poisonous tree". The exception is if it inevitably would have been discovered by legal means.

The Fourth Amendment was introduced in Congress in 1789 by James Madison, along with the other amendments in the Bill of Rights, in response to Anti-Federalist objections to the new Constitution. Congress submitted the amendment to the states on September 28, 1789. By December 15, 1791, the necessary three-fourths of the states had ratified it. On March 1, 1792, Secretary of State Thomas Jefferson announced that it was officially part of the Constitution.

Because the Bill of Rights did not initially apply to state or local governments, and federal criminal investigations were less common in the first century of the nation's history, there is little significant case law for the Fourth Amendment before the 20th century. The amendment was held to apply to state and local governments in Mapp v. Ohio (1961) via the Due Process Clause of the Fourteenth Amendment.

== Text ==
The right of the people to be secure in their persons, houses, papers, and effects, (Note: Effects are items of property.) against unreasonable searches and seizures, shall not be violated, and no Warrants shall issue, but upon probable cause, supported by Oath or affirmation, and particularly describing the place to be searched, and the persons or things to be seized.

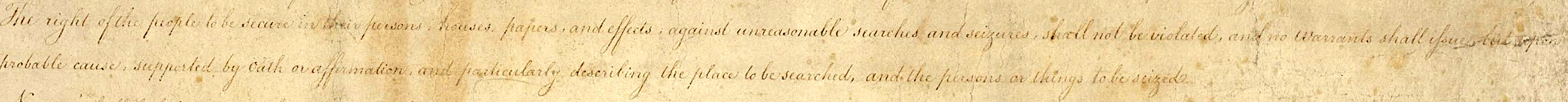
The hand-written copy of the proposed Bill of Rights, 1789, cropped to show just the text that would later be ratified as the Fourth Amendment

== Background ==
=== English law ===
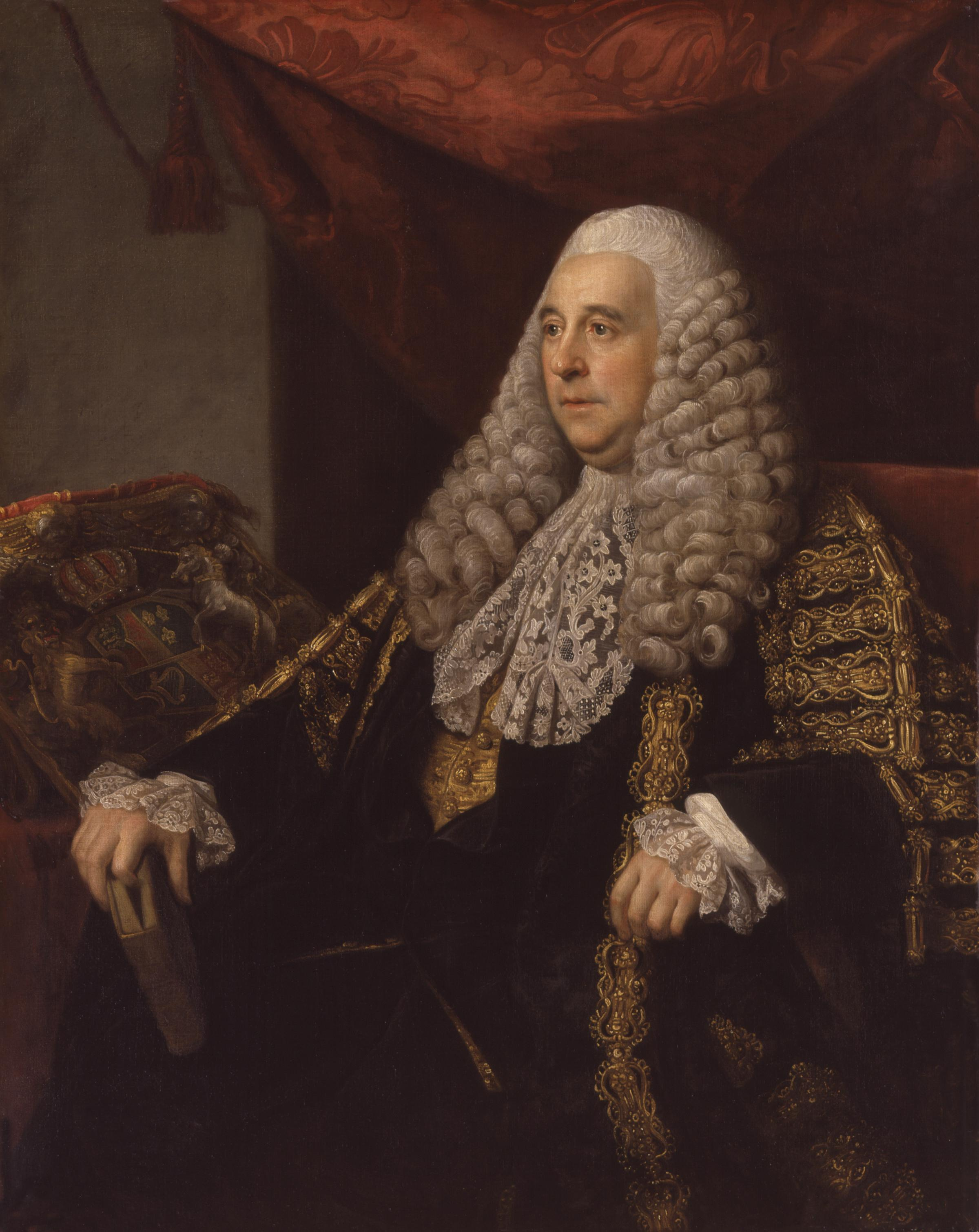
Charles Pratt, 1st Earl Camden established the English common law precedent against general search warrants.

Like many other areas of American law, the Fourth Amendment finds its origin in English legal doctrine. In Semayne's case (1604), Sir Edward Coke stated: "The house of every one is to him as his castle and fortress, as well for his defence against injury and violence as for his repose." Semayne's Case acknowledged that the King did not have unbridled authority to intrude on his subjects' dwellings, but recognized that government agents were permitted to conduct searches and seizures under certain conditions when their purpose was lawful and a warrant had been obtained.

The 1760s saw a growth in the intensity of litigation against state officers, who were using general warrants, conducted raids in search of materials relating to John Wilkes's publications. The most famous of these cases involved John Entick whose home was forcibly entered by the King's Messenger Nathan Carrington, along with others, pursuant to a warrant issued by George Montagu-Dunk, 2nd Earl of Halifax authorizing them "to make strict and diligent search for ... the author, or one concerned in the writing of several weekly very seditious papers entitled, 'The Monitor or British Freeholder, No 257, 357, 358, 360, 373, 376, 378, and 380'", the search resulting in seizure of printed charts, pamphlets and other materials. Entick filed suit in Entick v Carrington, argued before the Court of King's Bench in 1765. Charles Pratt, 1st Earl Camden ruled that both the search and the seizure were unlawful, as the warrant authorized the seizure of all of Entick's papers—not just the criminal ones—and as the warrant lacked probable cause to even justify the search. By holding that "[O]ur law holds the property of every man so sacred, that no man can set his foot upon his neighbour's close without his leave", Entick established the English precedent that the executive is limited in intruding on private property by common law.

=== Colonial America ===
Homes in Colonial America, on the other hand, did not enjoy the same sanctity as their British counterparts, because legislation had been explicitly written so as to enable enforcement of British revenue-gathering policies on customs; until 1750, in fact, the only type of warrant defined in the handbooks for justices of the peace was the general warrant. During what scholar William Cuddihy called the "colonial epidemic of general searches", the authorities possessed almost unlimited power to search for anything at any time, with very little oversight.

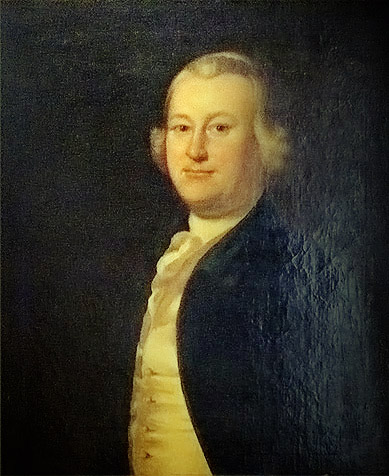
Massachusetts lawyer James Otis protested British use of general warrants in the American colonies.

In 1756, the colony of Massachusetts barred the use of general warrants. This represented the first law in American history curtailing the use of seizure power. Its creation largely stemmed from the great public outcry over the Excise Act of 1754, which gave tax collectors unlimited powers to interrogate colonists concerning their use of goods subject to customs. The act also permitted the use of a general warrant known as a writ of assistance, allowing tax collectors to search the homes of colonists and seize "prohibited and uncustomed" goods. A crisis erupted over the writs of assistance on December 27, 1760, when the news of King George II's death on October 23 arrived in Boston. All writs automatically expired six months after the death of the King, and would have had to be re-issued by George III, the new king, to remain valid.

In mid-January 1761, a group of more than fifty merchants represented by James Otis petitioned the court to have hearings on the issue. During the five-hour hearing on February 23, 1761, Otis vehemently denounced British colonial policies, including their sanction of general warrants and writs of assistance. However, the court ruled against Otis. Future President John Adams, who was present in the courtroom when Otis spoke, viewed these events as "the spark in which originated the American Revolution".

Because of the name he had made for himself in attacking the writs, Otis was elected to the Massachusetts colonial legislature and helped pass legislation requiring that special writs of assistance be "granted by any judge or justice of the peace upon information under oath by any officer of the customs" and barring all other writs. The governor overturned the legislation, finding it contrary to English law and parliamentary sovereignty.

Seeing the danger general warrants presented, the Virginia Declaration of Rights (1776) explicitly forbade the use of general warrants. This prohibition became a precedent for the Fourth Amendment:

That general warrants, whereby any officer or messenger may be commanded to search suspected places without evidence of a fact committed, or to seize any person or persons not named, or whose offense is not particularly described and supported by evidence, are grievous and oppressive and ought not to be granted.

Article XIV of the Massachusetts Declaration of Rights, written by John Adams and enacted in 1780 as part of the Massachusetts Constitution, added the requirement that all searches must be "reasonable", and served as another basis for the language of the Fourth Amendment:

Every subject has a right to be secure from all unreasonable searches, and seizures of his person, his houses, his papers, and all his possessions. All warrants, therefore, are contrary to this right, if the cause or foundation of them be not previously supported by oath or affirmation; and if the order in the warrant to a civil officer, to make search in suspected places, or to arrest one or more suspected persons, or to seize their property, be not accompanied with a special designation of the persons or objects of search, arrest, or seizure: and no warrant ought to be issued but in cases, and with the formalities, prescribed by the laws.

By 1784, eight state constitutions contained a provision against general warrants.

== Proposal and ratification ==
After several years of comparatively weak government under the Articles of Confederation, a Constitutional Convention in Philadelphia proposed a new constitution on September 17, 1787, featuring a stronger chief executive and other changes. George Mason, a Constitutional Convention delegate and the drafter of Virginia's Declaration of Rights, proposed that a bill of rights listing and guaranteeing civil liberties be included. Other delegates—including future Bill of Rights drafter James Madison—disagreed, arguing that existing state guarantees of civil liberties were sufficient and that any attempt to enumerate individual rights risked implying that other, unnamed rights were unprotected. After a brief debate, Mason's proposal was defeated by a unanimous vote of the state delegations.

For the Constitution to be ratified, nine of the thirteen states were required to approve it in state conventions. Opposition to ratification ("Anti-Federalism") was partly based on the Constitution's lack of adequate guarantees for civil liberties. Supporters of the Constitution in states where popular sentiment was against ratification (including Virginia, Massachusetts, and New York) successfully proposed that their state conventions both ratify the Constitution and call for the addition of a bill of rights. Four state conventions proposed some form of restriction on the authority of the new federal government to conduct searches.

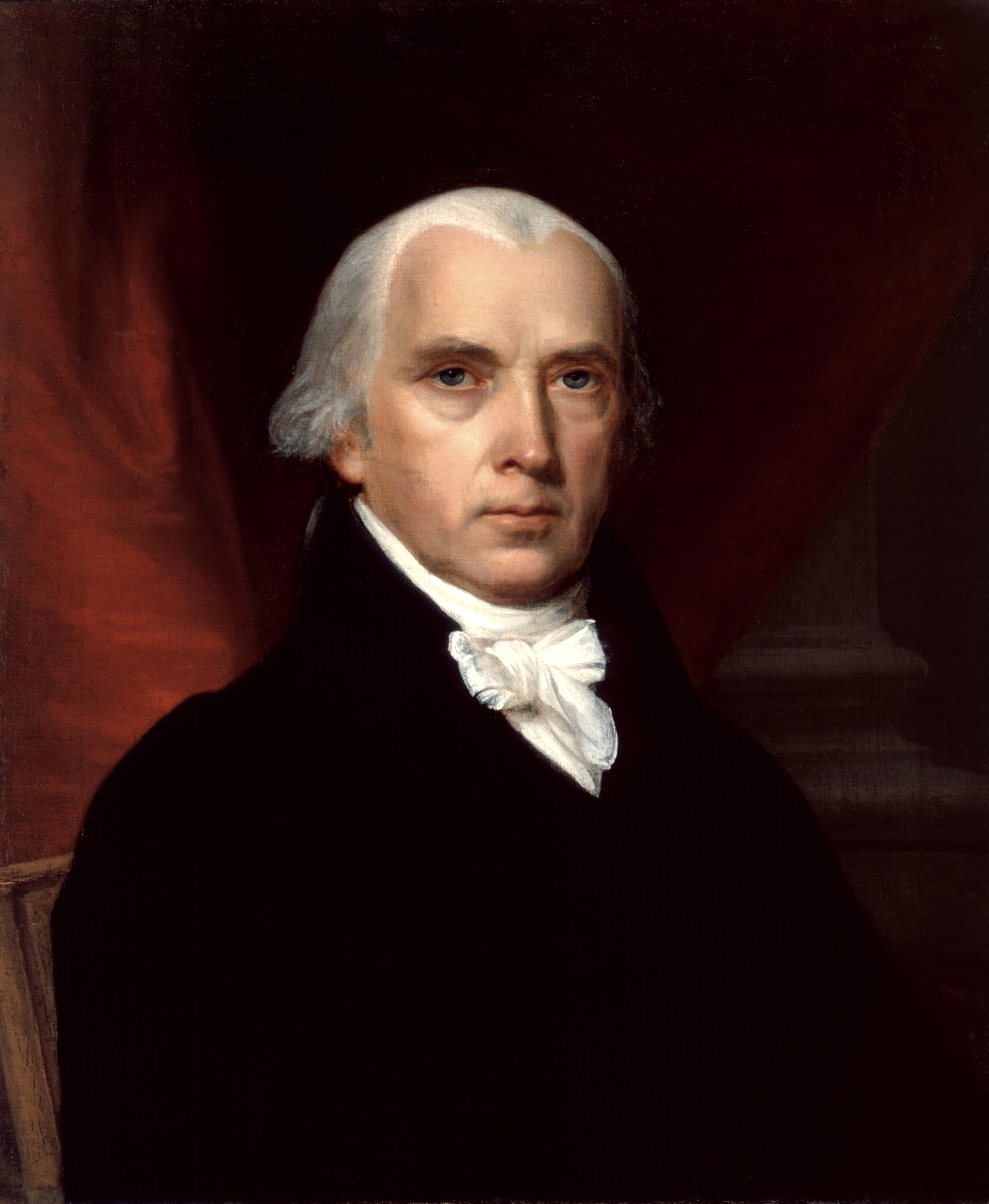
James Madison, drafter of the Bill of Rights

In the 1st United States Congress, following the state legislatures' request, James Madison proposed twenty constitutional amendments based on state bills of rights and English sources such as the Bill of Rights 1689, including an amendment requiring probable cause for government searches. Congress reduced Madison's proposed twenty amendments to twelve, with modifications to Madison's language about searches and seizures. The final language was submitted to the states for ratification on September 25, 1789.

By the time the Bill of Rights was submitted to the states for ratification, opinions had shifted in both parties. Many Federalists, who had previously opposed a Bill of Rights, now supported the Bill as a means of silencing the Anti-Federalists' most effective criticism. Many Anti-Federalists, in contrast, now opposed it, realizing the Bill's adoption would greatly lessen the chances of a second constitutional convention, which they desired. Anti-Federalists such as Richard Henry Lee also argued that the Bill left the most objectionable portions of the Constitution, such as the federal judiciary and direct taxation, intact.

On November 20, 1789, New Jersey ratified eleven of the twelve amendments, including the Fourth. On December 19, 1789, December 22, 1789, and January 19, 1790, respectively, Maryland, North Carolina, and South Carolina ratified all twelve amendments. On January 25 and 28, 1790, respectively, New Hampshire and Delaware ratified eleven of the Bill's twelve amendments, including the Fourth. This brought the total of ratifying states to six of the required ten, but the process stalled in other states: Connecticut and Georgia found a Bill of Rights unnecessary and so refused to ratify, while Massachusetts ratified most of the amendments, but failed to send official notice to the Secretary of State that it had done so (all three states would later ratify the Bill of Rights for sesquicentennial celebrations in 1939).

In February through June 1790, New York, Pennsylvania, and Rhode Island each ratified eleven of the amendments, including the Fourth. Virginia initially postponed its debate, but after Vermont was admitted to the Union in 1791, the total number of states needed for ratification rose to eleven. Vermont ratified on November 3, 1791, approving all twelve amendments, and Virginia finally followed on December 15, 1791. Secretary of State Thomas Jefferson announced the adoption of the ten successfully ratified amendments on March 1, 1792.

== Applicability ==
The point of the Fourth Amendment, which often is not grasped by zealous officers, is not that it denies law enforcement the support of the usual inferences which reasonable men draw from evidence. Its protection consists in requiring that those inferences be drawn by a neutral and detached magistrate instead of being judged by the officer engaged in the often competitive enterprise of ferreting out crime. Any assumption that evidence sufficient to support a magistrate's disinterested determination to issue a search warrant will justify the officers in making a search without a warrant would reduce the Amendment to a nullity, and leave the people's homes secure only in the discretion of police officers. Crime, even in the privacy of one's own quarters, is, of course, of grave concern to society, and the law allows such crime to be reached on proper showing. The right of officers to thrust themselves into a home is also a grave concern, not only to the individual, but to a society which chooses to dwell in reasonable security and freedom from surveillance. When the right of privacy must reasonably yield to the right of search is, as a rule, to be decided by a judicial officer, not by a policeman or government enforcement agent.

— Justice Robert H. Jackson in the Opinion of the Court in Johnson v. United States (1948).

The Fourth Amendment, and the personal rights which it secures, have a long history. The Bill of Rights originally restricted only the federal government, and went through a long initial phase of "judicial dormancy;" in the words of historian Gordon S. Wood, "After ratification, most Americans promptly forgot about the first ten amendments to the Constitution." Federal jurisdiction regarding criminal law was narrow until the late 19th century when the Interstate Commerce Act and Sherman Antitrust Act were passed. As federal criminal jurisdiction expanded to include other areas such as narcotics, more questions about the Fourth Amendment came to the U.S. Supreme Court. In Hale v. Henkel (1906), the Supreme Court applied the Fourth Amendment to corporations, protecting corporate records from search and seizure. The Supreme Court responded to these questions by stating on the one hand that the government powers to search and seizure are limited by the Fourth Amendment so that arbitrary and oppressive interference by enforcement officials with the privacy and personal security of individuals are prevented and by outlining on the other hand the fundamental purpose of the amendment as guaranteeing "the privacy, dignity and security of persons against certain arbitrary and invasive acts by officers of the Government, without regard to whether the government actor is investigating crime or performing another function". To protect personal privacy and dignity against unwarranted intrusion by the State is the overriding function of the Fourth Amendment according to the Court in Schmerber v. California (1966), because "[t]he security of one's privacy against arbitrary intrusion by the police" is "at the core of the Fourth Amendment" and "basic to a free society". Pointing to historic precedents like Entick v Carrington (1765) and Boyd v. United States (1886), the Supreme Court held in Silverman v. United States (1961) that the Fourth Amendments core is the right to retreat into his own home and there be free from unreasonable governmental intrusion. The Supreme Court declared in Berger v. New York (1967) that the Fourth Amendment's protections include "conversation" and is not limited to "persons, houses, papers, and effects". The New York Court of Appeals observed in 1975: "The basic purpose of the constitutional protections against unlawful searches and seizures is to safeguard the privacy and security of each and every person against all arbitrary intrusions by government. Therefore, any time an intrusion on the security and privacy of the individual is undertaken with intent to harass or is based upon mere whim, caprice or idle curiosity, the spirit of the Constitution has been violated and the aggrieved party may invoke the exclusionary rule or appropriate forms of civil redress." With a view to Camara v. Municipal Court (1967) the Supreme Court observed in Torres v. Madrid (2021) that the focus of the Fourth Amendment is the privacy and security of individuals, not the particular manner of arbitrary invasion by governmental officials. The Court held in Soldal v. Cook County (1992) that the Amendment protects property as well as privacy interests, in both criminal as well as civil contexts. In Mapp v. Ohio (1961), the Supreme Court ruled that the Fourth Amendment applies to the states by way of the Due Process Clause of the Fourteenth Amendment.

The effect of the Fourth Amendment is to put the courts of the United States and Federal officials, in the exercise of their power and authority, under limitations and restraints as to the exercise of such power and authority, and to forever secure the people, their persons, houses, papers, and effects, against all unreasonable searches and seizures under the guise of law. This protection reaches all alike, whether accused of crime or not, and the duty of giving to it force and effect is obligatory upon all intrusted under our Federal system with the enforcement of the laws. The tendency of those who execute the criminal laws of the country to obtain conviction by means of unlawful seizures and enforced confessions, the latter often obtained after subjecting accused persons to unwarranted practices destructive of rights secured by the Federal Constitution, should find no sanction in the judgments of the courts, which are charged at all times with the support of the Constitution, and to which people of all conditions have a right to appeal for the maintenance of such fundamental rights.

— Justice William R. Day in the Opinion of the Court in Weeks v. United States (1914).

Fourth Amendment case law deals with three central issues: what government activities constitute "search" and "seizure;" what constitutes probable cause for these actions; how violations of Fourth Amendment rights should be addressed. The text of the amendment is brief, and most of the law determining what constitutes an unlawful search and seizure is found in court rulings. The brief definitions of the terms "search" and "seizure" was concisely summarized in United States v. Jacobsen, which said that the Fourth Amendment:

protects two types of expectations, one involving "searches", the other "seizures". A search occurs when an expectation of privacy that society is prepared to consider reasonable is infringed. A seizure of property occurs where there is some meaningful interference with an individual's possessory interests in that property.

"The Fourth Amendment search and seizure doctrine involves a complex compromise between public safety and the constitutional right to personal liberty." The Fourth Amendment typically requires "a neutral and detached authority interposed between the police and the public", and it is offended by "general warrants" and laws that allow searches to be conducted "indiscriminately and without regard to their connection with [a] crime under investigation", for the "basic purpose of the Fourth Amendment, which is enforceable against the States through the Fourteenth, through its prohibition of 'unreasonable' searches and seizures is to safeguard the privacy and security of individuals against arbitrary invasions by governmental officials".

The Fourth Amendment has been held to mean that a search or an arrest generally requires a judicially sanctioned warrant, because the basic rule under the Fourth Amendment is that arrests and "searches conducted outside the judicial process, without prior approval by judge or magistrate, are per se unreasonable under the Fourth Amendment—subject only to a few specifically established and well-delineated exceptions". In order for such a warrant to be considered reasonable, it must be supported by probable cause and be limited in scope according to specific information supplied by a person (usually a law enforcement officer) who has sworn by it and is therefore accountable to the issuing court. Where there was no clear practice, either approving or disapproving the type of search at issue, at the time the constitutional provision was enacted, the "reasonableness" of a search is judged by balancing the intrusion on the individual's Fourth Amendment interests against the promotion of legitimate governmental interests. The Supreme Court further held in Chandler v. Miller (1997): "To be reasonable under the Fourth Amendment, a search ordinarily must be based on individualized suspicion of wrongdoing. But particularized exceptions to the main rule are sometimes warranted based on 'special needs, beyond the normal need for law enforcement'. ... When such 'special needs' are alleged, courts must undertake a context-specific inquiry, examining closely the competing private and public interests advanced by the parties." The reasonableness of any particular search and seizure according to the Supreme Court in Terry v. Ohio (1968) must be assessed in light of the particular circumstances against the standard of whether a man of reasonable caution is warranted in believing that the action taken was appropriate. The amendment applies to governmental searches and seizures, but not those done by private citizens or organizations who are not acting on behalf of a government. In Ontario v. Quon (2010), the Court applied the amendment to a municipal government in its capacity as an employer, ruling that the City of Ontario had not violated the Fourth Amendment rights of city police officers by obtaining from the communications company and reviewing transcripts of text messages sent using government-provided pagers.

=== Search ===
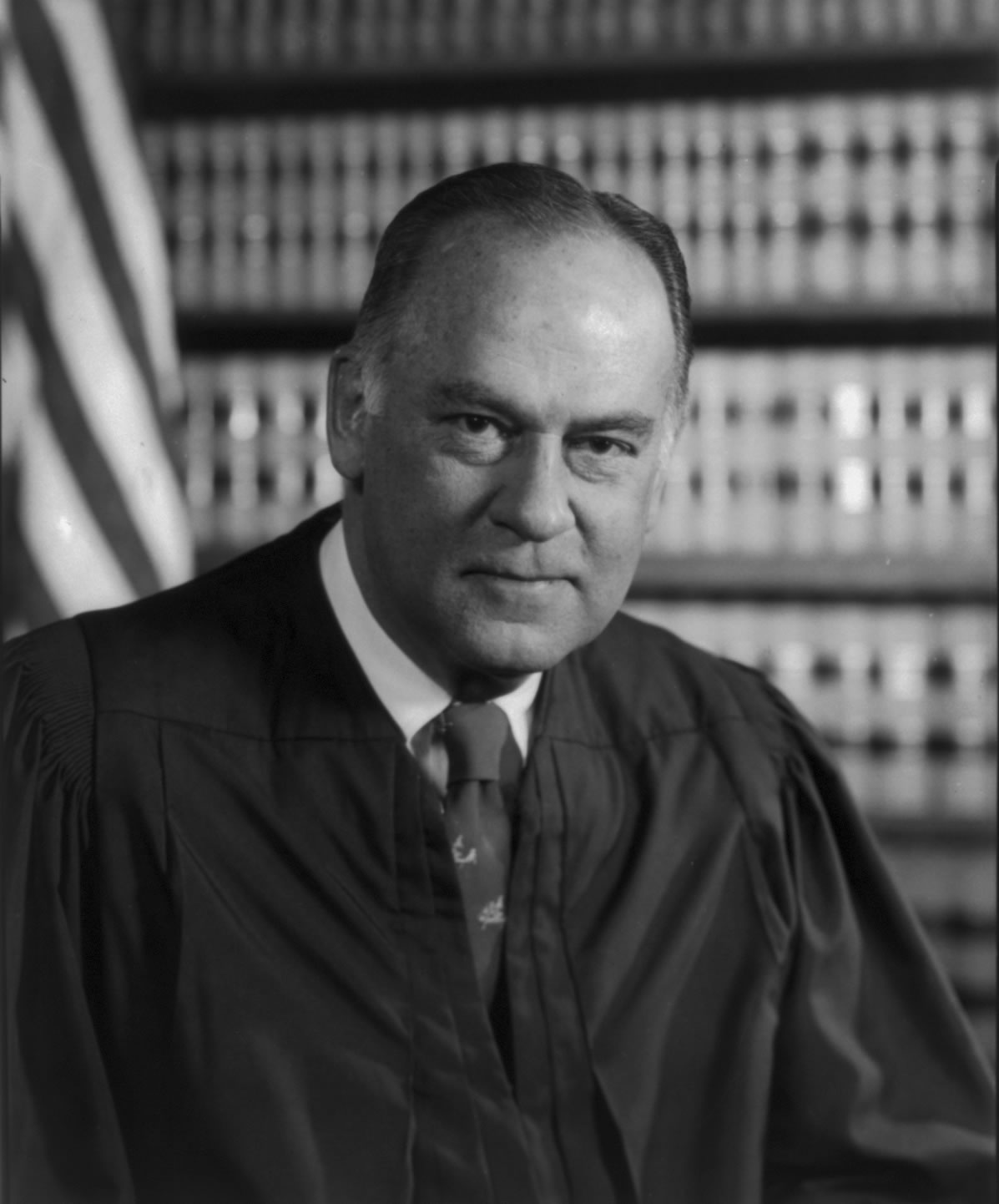
Potter Stewart wrote the majority decision in Katz v. United States, which expanded Fourth Amendment protections to electronic surveillance.

One threshold question in the Fourth Amendment jurisprudence is whether a "search" has occurred. Initial Fourth Amendment case law hinged on a citizen's property rights—that is, when the government physically intrudes on "persons, houses, papers, or effects" for the purpose of obtaining information, a "search" within the original meaning of the Fourth Amendment, has occurred. Early 20th-century Court decisions, such as Olmstead v. United States (1928), held that Fourth Amendment rights applied in cases of physical intrusion, but not to other forms of police surveillance (e.g., wiretaps). In Silverman v. United States (1961), the Court stated of the amendment that "at the very core stands the right of a man to retreat into his own home and there be free from unreasonable governmental intrusion".

Fourth Amendment protections expanded significantly with Katz v. United States (1967). In Katz, the Supreme Court expanded that focus to embrace an individual's right to privacy, and ruled that a search had occurred when the government wiretapped a telephone booth using a microphone attached to the outside of the glass. While there was no physical intrusion into the booth, the Court reasoned that: 1) Katz, by entering the booth and shutting the door behind him, had exhibited his expectation that "the words he utters into the mouthpiece will not be broadcast to the world"; and 2) society believes that his expectation was reasonable. Justice Potter Stewart wrote in the majority opinion that "the Fourth Amendment protects people, not places". A "search" occurs for purposes of the Fourth Amendment when the government violates a person's "reasonable expectation of privacy". Katz's reasonable expectation of privacy thus provided the basis to rule that the government's intrusion, though electronic rather than physical, was a search covered by the Fourth Amendment, and thus necessitated a warrant. The Court said it was not recognizing any general right to privacy in the Fourth Amendment, and that this wiretap could have been authorized if proper procedures had been followed.

This decision in Katz was later developed into the now commonly used two-prong test, adopted in Smith v. Maryland (1979), for determining whether a search has occurred for purposes of the Fourth Amendment:

1. a person "has exhibited an actual (subjective) expectation of privacy"; and
2. society is prepared to recognize that this expectation is (objectively) reasonable.

The Supreme Court has held that the Fourth Amendment does not apply to information that is voluntarily shared with third parties. In Smith, the Court held individuals have no "legitimate expectation of privacy" regarding the telephone numbers they dial because they knowingly give that information to telephone companies when they dial a number. However, under Carpenter v. United States (2018), individuals have a reasonable expectation of privacy under the Fourth Amendment regarding cell phone records even though they themselves turned over that information to "third parties" (i.e. the cell phone companies). Prior to the Carpenter ruling, law enforcement was able to retrieve cell site location information (CSLI) that included where a cell phone user had traveled over many months and with which other cell phone users they had associated. Carpenter v. United States serves as a landmark case because it slightly narrowed the Third Party Doctrine, thus requiring law enforcement to first obtain a search warrant before receiving CSLI records. "In the 5-4 [Carpenter] decision, the Court ruled 'narrowly' in favor of privacy, finding the government had constitutionally violated Mr. Carpenter's reasonable expectation of privacy by acquiring this private information without a warrant."

Following Katz, the vast majority of Fourth Amendment search cases have turned on the right to privacy, but in United States v. Jones (2012), the Court ruled that the Katz standard did not replace earlier case law, but rather, has supplemented it. In Jones, law enforcement officers had attached a GPS device on a car's exterior without Jones's knowledge or consent. The Court concluded that Jones was a bailee to the car, and so had a property interest in the car. Therefore, since the intrusion on the vehicle—a common law trespass—was for the purpose of obtaining information, the Court ruled that it was a search under the Fourth Amendment. The Court used similar "trespass" reasoning in Florida v. Jardines (2013), to rule that bringing a drug detection dog to sniff at the front door of a home was a search.

In many situations, law enforcement may perform a search when they have a reasonable suspicion of criminal activity, even if it falls short of probable cause necessary for an arrest. Under Terry v. Ohio (1968), law enforcement officers are permitted to conduct a limited warrantless search on a level of suspicion less than probable cause under certain circumstances. In Terry, the Supreme Court ruled that when a police officer witnesses "unusual conduct" that leads the officer to reasonably believe "that criminal activity may be afoot", that the suspicious person has a weapon and that the person is presently dangerous to the officer or others, the officer may conduct a pat-down search ("frisk" the person) to determine whether the person is carrying a weapon. This detention and search is known as a Terry stop. To conduct a frisk, officers must be able to point to specific and articulable facts which, taken together with rational inferences from those facts, reasonably warrant their actions. As established in Florida v. Royer (1983), such a search must be temporary, and questioning must be limited to the purpose of the stop (e.g., officers who stop a person because they have reasonable suspicion to believe the person was driving a stolen car, cannot, after confirming it is not stolen, compel the person to answer questions about anything else, such as contraband).

=== Seizure ===
The Fourth Amendment also protects "[t]he right of the people to be secure in their persons, houses, papers and effects, against unreasonable ... seizures". A seizure of property occurs when there is "some meaningful interference with an individual's possessory interests in that property", such as when police officers take personal property away from an owner to use as evidence, or when they participate in an eviction. The amendment also protects against unreasonable seizure of persons, including a brief detention.

A seizure does not occur just because the government questions an individual in a public place. The exclusionary rule would not bar voluntary answers to such questions from being offered into evidence in a subsequent criminal prosecution. The person is not being seized if his freedom of movement is not restrained. The government may not detain an individual even momentarily without reasonable, objective grounds, with few exceptions. His refusal to listen or answer does not by itself furnish such grounds.

In United States v. Mendenhall (1980), the Court held that a person is seized only when, by means of physical force or show of authority, his freedom of movement is restrained and, in the circumstances surrounding the incident, a reasonable person would believe he was not free to leave. Under Torres v. Madrid (2021), a person is considered to be seized following the use of physical force with the intent to restrain, even if the person manages to escape. In Florida v. Bostick (1991), the Court ruled that as long as the police do not convey a message that compliance with their requests is required, the police contact is a "citizen encounter" that falls outside the protections of the Fourth Amendment. If a person remains free to disregard questioning by the government, there has been no seizure and therefore no intrusion upon the person's privacy under the Fourth Amendment.

When a person is arrested and taken into police custody, he has been seized (i.e., a reasonable person who is handcuffed and placed in the back of a police car would not think they were free to leave). A person subjected to a routine traffic stop on the other hand, has been seized, but is not "arrested" because traffic stops are a relatively brief encounter and are more analogous to a Terry stop than to a formal arrest. If a person is not under suspicion of illegal behavior, a law enforcement official is not allowed to place an individual under arrest simply because this person does not wish to state his identity, provided specific state regulations do not specify this to be the case. A search incidental to an arrest that is not permissible under state law does not violate the Fourth Amendment, so long as the arresting officer has probable cause. In Maryland v. King (2013), the Court upheld the constitutionality of police swabbing for DNA upon arrests for serious crimes, along the same reasoning that allows police to take fingerprints or photographs of those they arrest and detain.

==== Exceptions ====
The government may not detain an individual even momentarily without reasonable and articulable suspicion, with a few exceptions. In Delaware v. Prouse (1979), the Court ruled an officer has made an illegal seizure when he stops an automobile and detains the driver in order to check his driver's license and the registration of the automobile, because the officer does not have articulable and reasonable suspicion that a motorist is unlicensed or that an automobile is not registered, or either the vehicle or an occupant is otherwise subject to seizure for violation of law.

Where society's need is great, no other effective means of meeting the need is available, and intrusion on people's privacy is minimal, certain discretionless checkpoints toward that end may briefly detain motorists. In United States v. Martinez-Fuerte (1976), the Supreme Court allowed discretionless immigration checkpoints. In Michigan Dept. of State Police v. Sitz (1990), the Supreme Court allowed discretionless sobriety checkpoints. In Illinois v. Lidster (2004), the Supreme Court allowed focused informational checkpoints. However, in City of Indianapolis v. Edmond (2000), the Supreme Court ruled that discretionary checkpoints or general crime-fighting checkpoints are not allowed.

=== Warrant ===
Under the Fourth Amendment, law enforcement must receive written permission from a court of law, or otherwise qualified magistrate, to lawfully search and seize evidence while investigating criminal activity. A court grants permission by issuing a writ known as a warrant. A search or seizure is generally unreasonable and unconstitutional if conducted without a valid warrant and the police must obtain a warrant whenever practicable. Searches and seizures without a warrant are not considered unreasonable if one of the specifically established and well-delineated exceptions to the warrant requirement applies. These exceptions apply "[o]nly in those exceptional circumstances in which special needs, beyond the normal need for law enforcement, make the warrant and probable cause requirement impracticable". In Marshall v. Barlow's, Inc., the Supreme Court ruled that OSHA needed probable cause to inspect a business.

In these situations where the warrant requirement doesn't apply a search or seizure nonetheless must be justified by some individualized suspicion of wrongdoing. However, the U.S. Supreme Court carved out an exception to the requirement of individualized suspicion. It ruled that, "In limited circumstances, where the privacy interests implicated by the search are minimal and where an important governmental interest furthered by the intrusion would be placed in jeopardy by a requirement of individualized suspicion" a search [or seizure] would still be reasonable.

=== Probable cause ===
The Supreme Court in Berger v. New York (1967) explained that the purpose of the probable cause requirement of the Fourth Amendment is to keep the state out of constitutionally protected areas until it has reason to believe that a specific crime has been or is being committed. The standards of probable cause differ for an arrest and a search. The government has probable cause to make an arrest when "the facts and circumstances within their knowledge and of which they had reasonably trustworthy information" would lead a prudent person to believe the arrested person had committed or was committing a crime. Probable cause to arrest must exist before the arrest is made. Evidence obtained after the arrest may not apply retroactively to justify the arrest.

When police conduct a search, the amendment requires that the warrant establish probable cause to believe the search will uncover criminal activity or contraband. They must have legally sufficient reasons to believe a search is necessary. In Carroll v. United States (1925), the Supreme Court stated that probable cause to search is a flexible, common-sense standard. To that end, the Court ruled in Dumbra v. United States (1925) that the term probable cause means "less than evidence that would justify condemnation", reiterating Carroll's assertion that it merely requires that the facts available to the officer would "warrant a man of reasonable caution" in the belief that specific items may be contraband or stolen property or useful as evidence of a crime. It does not demand any showing that such a belief be correct or more likely true than false. A "practical, non-technical" probability that incriminating evidence is involved is all that is required. In Illinois v. Gates (1983), the Court ruled that the reliability of an informant is to be determined based on the "totality of the circumstances".

== Exceptions to the warrant requirement ==
=== Consent ===
If a party gives consent to a search, a warrant is not required. There are exceptions and complications to the rule, including the scope of the consent given, whether the consent is voluntarily given, and whether an individual has the right to consent to a search of another's property. In Schneckloth v. Bustamonte (1973), the Court ruled that a consent search is still valid even if the police do not inform a suspect of his right to refuse the search. This contrasts with Fifth Amendment rights, which cannot be relinquished without an explicit Miranda warning from police.

The Court stated in United States v. Matlock (1974) that a third party co-occupant could give consent for a search without violating a suspect's Fourth Amendment rights. However, in Georgia v. Randolph (2006), the Supreme Court ruled that when two co-occupants are both present, one consenting and the other rejecting the search of a shared residence, the police may not make a search of that residence within the consent exception to the warrant requirement. Per the Court's ruling in Illinois v. Rodriguez (1990), a consent search is still considered valid if police accept in good faith the consent of an "apparent authority", even if that party is later discovered not to have authority over the property in question. A telling case on this subject is Stoner v. California, in which the Court held that police officers could not rely in good faith upon the apparent authority of a hotel clerk to consent to the search of a guest's room.

=== Plain view and open fields ===
According to the plain view doctrine as defined in Coolidge v. New Hampshire (1971), if an officer is lawfully present, he may seize objects that are in "plain view". However, the officer must have had probable cause to believe the objects are contraband, and the criminality of the object in plain view must be obvious by its very nature. In Arizona v. Hicks, the Supreme Court held that an officer stepped beyond the plain view doctrine when he moved a turntable in order to view its serial number to confirm that the turntable was stolen. "A search is a search," proclaimed the Court, "even if it happens to disclose nothing but the bottom of a turntable."

Similarly, "open fields" such as pastures, open water, and woods may be searched without a warrant, on the ground that conduct occurring therein would have no reasonable expectation of privacy. The doctrine was first articulated by the Court in Hester v. United States (1924), which stated that "the special protection accorded by the Fourth Amendment to the people in their 'persons, houses, papers, and effects' is not extended to the open fields".

In Oliver v. United States (1984), the police ignored a "no trespassing" sign and a fence, trespassed onto the suspect's land without a warrant, followed a path for hundreds of feet, and discovered a field of marijuana. The Supreme Court ruled that no search had taken place, because there was no privacy expectation regarding an open field:

open fields do not provide the setting for those intimate activities that the Amendment is intended to shelter from government interference or surveillance. There is no societal interest in protecting the privacy of those activities, such as the cultivation of crops, that occur in open fields.

According to a 2024 study, at least 96% of all private land in the country, about 1.2 billion acres, qualify as unprotected open fields under current Fourth Amendment law.

While open fields are not protected by the Fourth Amendment, the curtilage, or outdoor area immediately surrounding the home, is protected. Courts have treated this area as an extension of the house and as such subject to all the privacy protections afforded a person's home (unlike a person's open fields) under the Fourth Amendment. The curtilage is "intimately linked to the home, both physically and psychologically", and is where "privacy expectations are most heightened". However, courts have held aerial surveillance of curtilage not to be included in the protections from unwarranted search so long as the airspace above the curtilage is generally accessible by the public. An area is curtilage if it "harbors the intimate activity associated with the sanctity of a man's home and the privacies of life". Courts make this determination by examining "whether the area is included within an enclosure surrounding the home, the nature of the uses to which the area is put, and the steps taken by the resident to protect the area from observation by people passing by". The Court has acknowledged that a doorbell or knocker is typically treated as an invitation, or license, to the public to approach the front door of the home to deliver mail, sell goods, solicit for charities, etc. This license extends to the police, who have the right to try engaging a home's occupant in a "knock and talk" for the purpose of gathering evidence without a warrant. However, they cannot bring a drug detection dog to sniff at the front door of a home without either a warrant or consent of the homeowner or resident.

Moreover, several state courts have rejected the open fields doctrine under their own state constitutional search-and-seizure provisions. Moreover, several of these decisions have been reaffirmed over time.

=== Exigent circumstance ===
Law enforcement officers may also conduct warrantless searches in several types of exigent circumstances where obtaining a warrant is dangerous or impractical. Under Terry v. Ohio (1968) police are permitted to frisk suspects for weapons. The Court also allowed a search of arrested persons in Weeks v. United States (1914) to preserve evidence that might otherwise be destroyed and to ensure suspects were disarmed. In Carroll v. United States (1925), the Court ruled that law enforcement officers could search a vehicle that they suspected of carrying contraband without a warrant. The Court allowed blood to be drawn without a warrant from drunk-driving suspects in Schmerber v. California (1966) on the grounds that the time to obtain a warrant would allow a suspect's blood alcohol content to reduce, although this was later modified by Missouri v. McNeely (2013). Warden v. Hayden (1967) provided an exception to the warrant requirement if officers were in "hot pursuit" of a suspect.

A subset of exigent circumstances is the debated community caretaking exception.

=== Motor vehicle ===
The Supreme Court has held that individuals in automobiles have a reduced expectation of privacy, because (1) vehicles generally do not serve as residences or repositories of personal effects, and (2) vehicles "can be quickly moved out of the locality or jurisdiction in which the warrant must be sought". Vehicles may not be randomly stopped and searched; there must be probable cause or reasonable suspicion of criminal activity. Items in plain view may be seized; areas that could potentially hide weapons may also be searched. With probable cause to believe evidence is present, police officers may search any area in the vehicle. However, they may not extend the search to the vehicle's passengers without probable cause to search those passengers or consent from the passengers. In Collins v. Virginia (2018), the Court ruled that the motor vehicle exception did not apply to searches of vehicles parked within a residence's curtilage.

In Arizona v. Gant (2009), the Court ruled that a law enforcement officer needs a warrant before searching a motor vehicle after an arrest of an occupant of that vehicle, unless 1) at the time of the search the person being arrested is unsecured and within reaching distance of the passenger compartment of the vehicle or 2) police officers have reason to believe evidence for the crime for which the person is being arrested will be found in the vehicle.

=== Searches incident to a lawful arrest ===
A common law rule from Great Britain permits searches incident to an arrest without a warrant. This rule has been applied in American law, and has a lengthy common law history. The justification for such a search is to prevent the arrested individual 1.) from destroying evidence or 2.) using a weapon against the arresting officer by disarming the suspect. The U.S. Supreme Court ruled that "both justifications for the search-incident-to-arrest exception are absent and the rule does not apply" when "there is no possibility" the suspect could gain access to a weapon or destroy evidence. In Trupiano v. United States (1948), the Supreme Court held that "a search or seizure without a warrant as an incident to a lawful arrest has always been considered to be a strictly limited right. It grows out of the inherent necessities of the situation at the time of the arrest. But there must be something more in the way of necessity than merely a lawful arrest." In United States v. Rabinowitz (1950), the Court reversed Trupiano, holding instead that the officers' opportunity to obtain a warrant was not germane to the reasonableness of a search incident to an arrest. Rabinowitz suggested that any area within the "immediate control" of the arrestee could be searched, but it did not define the term. In deciding Chimel v. California (1969), the Supreme Court elucidated its previous decisions. It held that when an arrest is made, it is reasonable for the officer to search the arrestee for weapons and evidence. However, in Riley v. California (2014), the Supreme Court ruled unanimously that police must obtain a warrant to search an arrestee's cellular phone. The Court said that earlier Supreme Court decisions permitting searches incident to an arrest without a warrant do not apply to "modern cellphones, which are now such a pervasive and insistent part of daily life that the proverbial visitor from Mars might conclude they were an important feature of human anatomy" and noted that U.S. citizens' cellphones today typically contain "a digital record of nearly every aspect of their lives—from the mundane to the intimate".

=== Border search exception ===
Searches conducted at the United States border or the equivalent of the border (such as an international airport) may be conducted without a warrant or probable cause subject to the border search exception. Most border searches may be conducted entirely at random, without any level of suspicion, pursuant to U.S. Customs and Border Protection plenary search authority. However, searches that intrude upon a traveler's personal dignity and privacy interests, such as strip and body cavity searches, must be supported by "reasonable suspicion". The U.S. Courts of Appeals for the Fourth and Ninth circuits have ruled that information on a traveler's electronic materials, including personal files on a laptop computer, may be searched at random, without suspicion. Federal law allows certain federal agents to conduct search and seizures within 100 miles (160 km) of the border into the interior of the United States.

=== Foreign intelligence surveillance ===
The Supreme Court decision in United States v. U.S. District Court (1972) left open the possibility for a foreign intelligence surveillance exception to the warrant clause. Three United States Courts of Appeals have recognized a foreign intelligence surveillance exception to the warrant clause, but tied it to certain requirements. The exception to the Fourth Amendment was formally recognized by the United States Foreign Intelligence Surveillance Court of Review in its 2008 In re Directives decision. The lower court held that "a foreign intelligence exception to the Fourth Amendment's warrant requirement exists when surveillance is conducted to obtain foreign intelligence for national security purposes and is directed against foreign powers or agents of foreign powers reasonably believed to be located outside the United States".

Despite the foregoing citation the Fourth Amendment prohibitions against unreasonable searches and seizures nonetheless apply to the contents of all communications, whatever the means, because, "a person's private communications are akin to personal papers". Fourth Amendment reasonableness is the point at which the United States government's interest advanced by a particular search or seizure outweighs the loss of individual privacy or freedom of movement that attends the government's action. The United Supreme Court said in Board of Education v. Earls (2002) when 'special needs', beyond the normal need for law enforcement, make the warrant and probable-cause requirement impracticable the reasonableness of a search is determined by balancing the nature of the intrusion on the individual's privacy against the promotion of legitimate governmental interests. Additionally in Illinois v. Lidster (2004) the Court explained in judging reasonableness it looks to "the gravity of the public concerns served by the seizure, the degree to which the seizure advances the public interest, and the severity of the interference with individual liberty". To protect the telecommunications carriers cooperating with the U.S. government from legal action, the Congress passed a bill updating the Foreign Intelligence Surveillance Act of 1978 to permit this type of surveillance.

=== Schools and prisons ===
In New Jersey v. T. L. O. (1985), the Supreme Court ruled that searches in public schools do not require warrants, as long as the searching officers have reasonable grounds for believing the search will result in finding evidence of illegal activity. Similarly, in Samson v. California (2006), the Court ruled that government offices may be searched for evidence of work-related misconduct by government employees on similar grounds. Searches of prison cells are subject to no restraints relating to reasonableness or probable cause. However, in Safford Unified School District v. Redding (2009), the Court ruled that school officials violated the Fourth Amendment when they strip searched a student based only on another student's claiming to have received drugs from her.

== Exclusionary rule ==
One way courts enforce the Fourth Amendment is through the use of the exclusionary rule. The rule provides that evidence obtained through a violation of the Fourth Amendment is generally not admissible by the prosecution during the defendant's criminal trial. The Court stated in Elkins v. United States (1960) that the rule's function "is to deter—to compel respect for the constitutional guaranty in the only effectively available way—by removing the incentive to disregard it".

The Court adopted the exclusionary rule in Weeks v. United States (1914), prior to which all evidence, no matter how seized, could be admitted in court. In Silverthorne Lumber Co. v. United States (1920) and Nardone v. United States (1939), the Court ruled that leads or other evidence resulting from illegally obtained evidence are also inadmissible in trials. Justice Felix Frankfurter described this secondary evidence in the Nardone decision as the "fruit of the poisonous tree". The Supreme Court rejected incorporating the exclusionary rule by way of the Fourteenth Amendment in Wolf v. Colorado (1949), but Wolf was explicitly overruled in Mapp v. Ohio (1961), making the Fourth Amendment (including the exclusionary rule) applicable in state proceedings.

The exclusionary rule and its effectiveness have often been controversial, particularly since its 1961 application to state proceedings. Critics charge that the rule hampers police investigation and can result in freeing guilty parties convicted on reliable evidence; other critics say the rule has not been successful in deterring illegal police searches. Proponents argue that the number of criminal convictions overturned under the rule has been minimal and that no other effective mechanism exists to enforce the Fourth Amendment. In 1982, California passed a "Victim's Bill of Rights" containing a provision to repeal the exclusionary rule; though the bill could not affect federally mandated rights under the Fourth Amendment, it blocked the state courts from expanding these protections further.

=== Limitations ===
Since 1974, the Supreme Court has repeatedly limited the exclusionary rule. In United States v. Calandra (1974), the Court ruled that grand juries may use illegally obtained evidence when questioning witnesses, because "the damage to that institution from the unprecedented extension of the exclusionary rule outweighs the benefit of any possible incremental deterrent effect". Explaining the purpose of the rule, the Court said the rule "is a judicially created remedy designed to safeguard Fourth Amendment rights generally through its deterrent effect, rather than a personal constitutional right of the party aggrieved".

Three cases in 1984 further restricted the exclusionary rule:

- In United States v. Leon (1984), the Court established the "good faith" exception to the rule, ruling that evidence seized by officers reasonably relying on a warrant was still admissible, even though the warrant was later found to be defective, unless an officer dishonestly or recklessly prepared an affidavit to seek a warrant, the issuing magistrate abandoned his neutrality, or the warrant lacked sufficient particularity.
- The Court determined in Nix v. Williams (1984) that "fruit of the poisonous tree" evidence could still be introduced if a prosecutor could demonstrate that it would have been an "inevitable discovery" of legitimate investigation.
- In Segura v. United States (1984), the Court ruled that evidence illegally found without a search warrant is admissible if the evidence is later found and legally seized based on information independent of the illegal search.

In Arizona v. Evans (1995) and Herring v. United States (2009), the Court ruled that the exclusionary rule does not apply to evidence found due to negligence regarding a government database, as long as the arresting police officer relied on that database in "good faith" and the negligence was not pervasive. In Davis v. United States (2011), the Court ruled that the exclusionary rule does not apply to a Fourth Amendment violation resulting from a reasonable reliance on binding appellate precedent. In Utah v. Strieff (2016), the Court ruled that evidence obtained from an unlawful police stop would not be excluded from court when the link between the stop and the evidence's discovery was "attenuated" by the discovery of an outstanding warrant during the stop.

The Supreme Court has also held the exclusionary rule not to apply in the following circumstances:

- evidence illegally seized by a "private actor" (i.e., not a governmental employee)
- tax hearings
- evidence collected by U.S. Customs agents
- deportation hearings
- evidence seized by probation or parole officers
- probation or parole revocation hearings

== Metadata ==
On December 16, 2013, in Klayman v. Obama, a United States district court ruled that the mass collection of metadata of Americans' telephone records by the National Security Agency probably violates the Fourth Amendment. The court granted a preliminary injunction, blocking the collection of phone data for two private plaintiffs and ordered the government to destroy any of their records that have been gathered. The court stayed the ruling pending a government appeal, recognizing the "significant national security interests at stake in this case and the novelty of the constitutional issues".

However, in ACLU v. Clapper, a United States district court ruled that the U.S. government's global telephone data-gathering system is needed to thwart potential terrorist attacks, and that it can work only if everyone's calls are included. The court also ruled that Congress legally set up the program and it does not violate anyone's constitutional rights. The court concluded that the telephone data being swept up by NSA did not belong to telephone users, but to the telephone companies. Also, the court held that when NSA obtains such data from the telephone companies, and then probes into it to find links between callers and potential terrorists, this further use of the data was not even a search under the Fourth Amendment, concluding that the controlling precedent is Smith v. Maryland, saying: "Smith's bedrock holding is that an individual has no legitimate expectation of privacy in information provided to third parties." The American Civil Liberties Union declared on January 2, 2014, that it will appeal the ruling that NSA bulk phone record collection is legal. "The government has a legitimate interest in tracking the associations of suspected terrorists, but tracking those associations does not require the government to subject every citizen to permanent surveillance", deputy ACLU legal director Jameel Jaffer said in a statement.

== See also ==
- Article 8 of the European Convention on Human Rights
- Fourth Amendment Protection Act
- NSA warrantless surveillance (2001–07)#Fourth Amendment issues
- Parallel construction
- Privacy laws of the United States
- Special needs exception
- Section Eight of the Canadian Charter of Rights and Freedoms
- subpoena ad testificandum
- subpoena duces tecum
- Warrantless searches in the United States

== Notes ==
Citations
