= Boyd v. United States =

1886 United States Supreme Court case regarding search and seizure

- Supreme Court of the United States

Argued December 11–14, 1885 Decided February 1, 1886
- Full case name: Boyd and others, Claimants, etc. v. United States
- Citations: 116 U.S. 616 (more) 6 S. Ct. 524; 29 L. Ed. 746

Holding
- A search and seizure is equivalent to a compulsory production of a man's private papers.

Court membership
- Chief Justice Morrison Waite Associate Justices Samuel F. Miller · Stephen J. Field; Joseph P. Bradley · John M. Harlan; William B. Woods · Stanley Matthews; Horace Gray · Samuel Blatchford

Case opinions
- Majority: Bradley, joined by Field, Harlan, Woods, Matthews, Gray, Blatchford
- Concurrence: Miller, joined by Waite

Boyd v. United States, 116 U.S. 616 (1886) was a decision by the United States Supreme Court in which the Court held that "a search and seizure [was] equivalent [to] a compulsory production of a man's private papers" and that the search was "an 'unreasonable search and seizure' within the meaning of the Fourth Amendment."

== Background ==
Thirty-five cases of plate glass were seized at the Port of New York for not paying import duties. To prove the case, the government compelled E.A. Boyd & Sons to produce their invoice from the Union Plate Glass Company of Liverpool, England. Boyd complied but claimed the order was a form of self-incrimination.

== Decision ==
In the published opinion, after citing Lord Camden's judgment in Entick v Carrington, 19 How. St. Tr. 1029, Justice Bradley said (630):

The principles laid down in this opinion affect the very essence of constitutional liberty and security. They reach farther than the concrete form of the case then before the court, with its adventitious circumstances; they apply to all invasions on the part of the government and its employees of the sanctity of a man's home and the privacies of life. It is not the breaking of his doors and the rummaging of his drawers that constitutes the essence of the offense; but it is the invasion of his indefeasible right of personal security, personal liberty, and private property, where that right has never been forfeited by his conviction of some public offense, it is the invasion of this sacred right which underlies and constitutes the essence of Lord Camden's judgment.

Although not expressly overruled, some aspects of the Supreme Court's opinion in Boyd have been limited or negated by subsequent Supreme Court decisions. For example, in the case of Fisher v. United States in 1976, the Supreme Court stated:

The proposition that the Fifth Amendment prevents compelled production of documents over objection that such production might incriminate stems from Boyd v. United States, 116 U.S. 616 (1886)..... Among its several pronouncements, Boyd was understood to declare that the seizure, under warrant or otherwise, of any purely evidentiary materials violated the Fourth Amendment and that the Fifth Amendment rendered these seized materials inadmissible. .... Several of Boyd's express or implicit declarations have not stood the test of time. The application of the Fourth Amendment to subpoenas was limited by Hale v. Henkel, 201 U.S. 43 (1906), and more recent cases. See, e. g., Oklahoma Press Pub. Co. v. Walling, 327 U.S. 186 (1946). Purely evidentiary (but "nontestimonial") materials, as well as contraband and fruits and instrumentalities of crime, may now be searched for and seized under proper circumstances, .... Also, any notion that "testimonial" evidence may never be seized and used in evidence is inconsistent with Katz v. United States, 389 U.S. 347 (1967); Osborn v. United States, 385 U.S. 323 (1966); and Berger v. New York, 388 U.S. 41 (1967), approving the seizure under appropriate circumstances of conversations of a person suspected of crime. See also Marron v. United States, 275 U.S. 192 (1927)...... It is also clear that the Fifth Amendment does not independently proscribe the compelled production of every sort of incriminating evidence but applies only when the accused is compelled to make a testimonial communication that is incriminating.....

== See also ==
- List of United States Supreme Court cases, volume 116
- Mere evidence rule
- Exclusionary rule
- Griswold v. Connecticut (1965) (also involving "the privacies of life")
- Andresen v. Maryland (1976)
- Payton v. New York (1980) (citing Boyd)
- United States v. Hubbell (2000)
