= NLF and PAVN battle tactics =

North Vietnamese and Viet Cong tactics in the Vietnam War

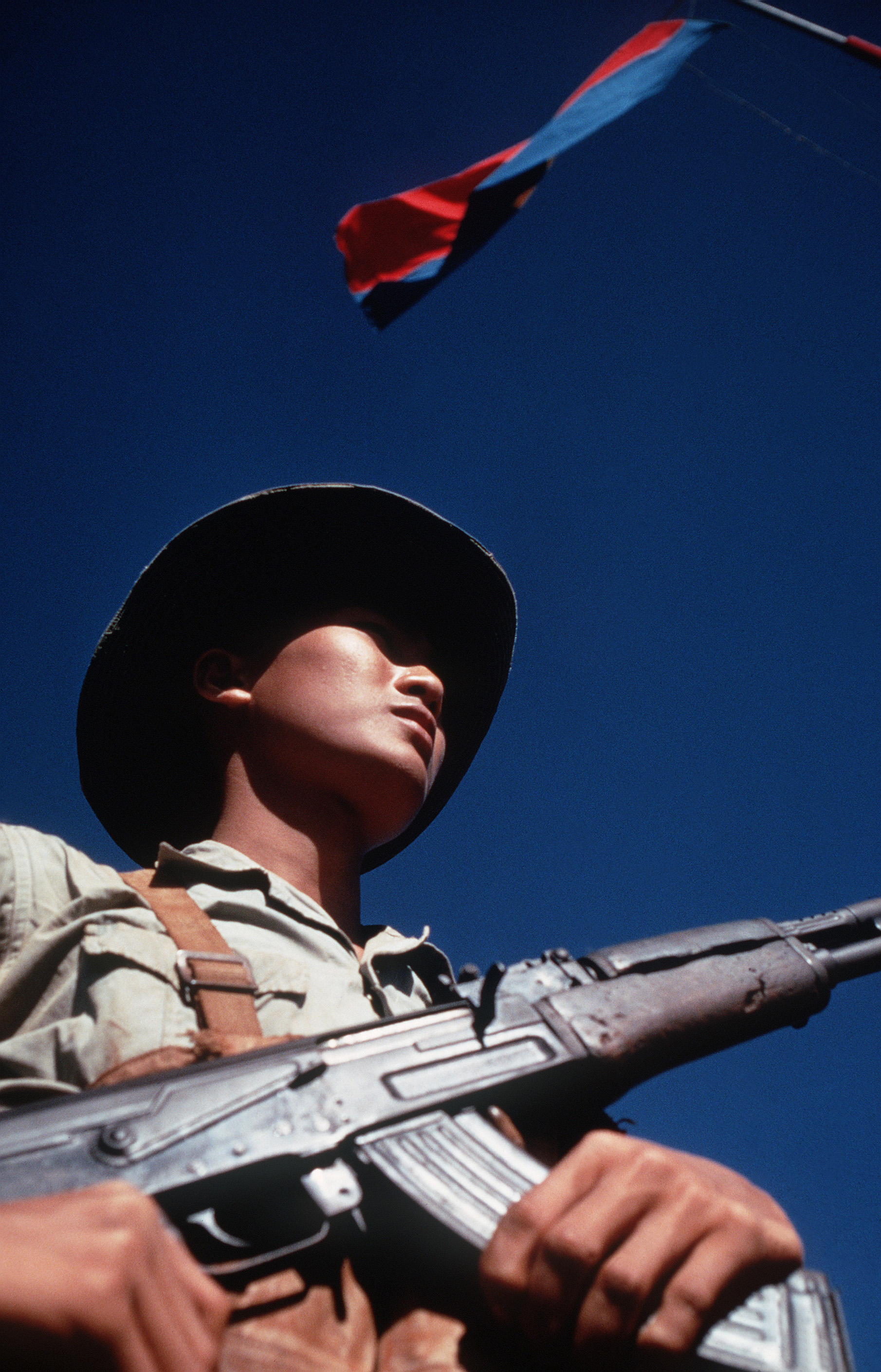
Member of a Viet Cong Main Force Unit. They shared common arms, procedures, tactics, organization and personnel with the PAVN

VC and PAVN battle tactics comprised a flexible mix of guerrilla and conventional warfare battle tactics used by Viet Cong (VC) and the North Vietnamese People's Army of Vietnam (PAVN) to defeat their U.S. and South Vietnamese (GVN/ARVN) opponents during the Vietnam War.

The VC was supposedly an umbrella of front groups to conduct the insurgency in South Vietnam affiliated with independent groups and sympathizers, but was in fact entirely controlled by the North Vietnamese communist party and the PAVN. The armed wing of the VC was regional and local guerrillas, and the People's Liberation Armed Forces (PLAF). The PLAF was the "Main Force" – the Chu Luc full-time soldiers of the VC's military muscle. Many histories lump both the VC and the armed wing under the term "Viet Cong" in common usage. Both were tightly interwoven and were in turn controlled by the North. Others consider the VC to primarily refer to the armed elements. The PAVN was the regular army of North Vietnam. Collectively, both forces – the southern armed wing and the regulars from the north were part of PAVN, and are treated as such in official communist histories of the war.

== VC/PAVN tactics in battle ==

=== Seizing the initiative: metering losses and controlling tempo ===
The PAVN and VC conducted numerous attacks and defensive maneuvers, generally having the advantage of choosing the time and place for such operations. Such initiative was sometimes blunted by ARVN countermeasures, or the aggressive "search and destroy" tactics of US forces under General William Westmoreland and the improved pacification measures of his successor General Creighton Abrams. Nevertheless, over the vast area that was South Vietnam, Laos and Cambodia, PAVN forces typically held the initiative in a conflict extending over a decade. One US military study for example found that 88 percent of all engagements against US forces were initiated by the enemy.

There were generally two approaches to metering losses. The first was attritional – operations were conducted to inflict maximum losses on ARVN/US forces. This meant expending lives and resources in attacks (ambushes, raids etc.) or in defensive operations (digging in to fight, bleeding opponents and then withdrawing when enemy forces grew too strong). Attacks were scaled up or down depending on a myriad of factors including the political situation in a particular area. The second approach was avoidance of battle unless numerical superiority and chances of success were good. In the Vietnam War, most PAVN/VC units (including mobile PAVN regulars using guerrilla tactics) spent only a limited number of days a year fighting. While they might be forced into an unwanted battle by an ARVN/US action, most of the time was spent in population control, training, intelligence gathering, propaganda indoctrination or construction of fortifications, with PAVN/VC troops typically only fighting an average of 1 day in 30. In essence, the VC/PAVN largely fought on the ground only when they wanted to fight.

Mastery of the initiative made the US attrition strategy of seeking big battles problematic, and also undermined South Vietnamese Government/ARVN attempts at pacification. Manpower losses could always be made up with more infiltration of regulars from the North and additional recruitment of VC within the South. The arrival of US forces in 1965 saw a shift back to small unit and guerrilla warfare. The average of battalion sized attacks for example dropped from 9.7 per month to 1.3, while small-scale actions climbed by 150 percent. While US troops were being lured to remote regions in pursuit of base areas, big battles and large casualty ratios, 90% of all attacks were consistently occurring in the 10 percent of the country that held over 80 percent of the population according to one American study covering 1966 and 1967. The US strategy thus not only failed to fully come to grips with an elusive enemy on the outer edges, but also failed to consistently keep them away from the inner populated areas as well.

=== Learning and adaptability ===
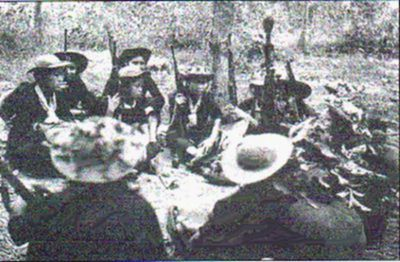
Criticism and self-criticism sessions and continuous study helped communist forces effectively adapt lessons learned on the battlefield

The VC/PAVN battle philosophy placed great stress on learning and adaptability, and systematically strived to improve battle techniques at the lowest levels. Units and individuals were expected to be problem solvers, making creative use out of what might be fleeting opportunities and scarce resources. After engagements, detailed after-action reports were conducted, and detailed analyses of various problems in the field were carried out. After an action, both individuals and units examined their performance through widespread "criticism and self-criticism" sessions, and even commanders were taken to task at the appropriate levels. The lessons learned were continually incorporated into NVA/VC operations. Experiments were also carried out by different units and the results were disseminated via conferences, field manuals, memoranda and new procedures.

This capability to adapt was crucial when facing new technology, such as US helicopters. Several studies were conducted on how to combat the menace from above, and aiming and firing procedures were worked out for a variety of weapons, such as heavy machine guns. In one VC publication, shooting 1 1/2 lengths ahead of the aircraft was deemed satisfactory for striking vital engine parts. Firing tables were also constructed and disseminated for different types of US aircraft. Countermeasures, including use of trenches and mines were also published for such armored vehicles as the M113 armored personnel carrier, which was often devastating to VC formations when first introduced.

The PAVN/VC forces did not only study the technology of their enemies but their operations as well, looking for weaknesses to exploit. American activities were sometimes left unmolested so vulnerable patterns could be identified and analyzed. American "surround and pound" tactics for example could sometimes be predictable. At the Battle of Ong Thanh for example, heavy American airstrikes were called in to hit a bunker complex, which was then predictably followed by US "mop up" operations the next day. The American "mop up" forces fell into a deadly prepared ambush, with VC fighters inflicting heavy casualties. Excessively hovering helicopters were also a tip-off as to possible landing zones. Taking predictable routes and trails also opened up ARVN/American opponents to casualties via booby traps, mines and ambushes. American air strikes were sometimes ground-marked several minutes in advance, giving PAVN/VC units enough time to evacuate an area or prepare for ambushes. American smoke marking practices were also studied and PAVN/VC troops sometimes became adept at imitating the color-coded smoke grenades the Americans used to signal air strikes or helicopter landings. This intensive study and exploitation never ceased, and lessons learned were disseminated to other PAVN/VC formations.

=== Mobility and movement ===
==== Movement and area control ====
VC camp and movement network in one SVN district, 1966–67.

The PAVN/VC were constantly on the move, seldom staying more than 2–4 days in one place. Integral to mobility was elaborate camouflage and information denial procedures, such as restricting civilian movements prior to, or during an operation. Frequent rotation involved bivouacking in a series of fortified camps. These fortified sites could also be within villages or their subsidiary hamlets.

Constant shuttling between camps or "nomading," allowed the VC and PAVN to evade detection and defend themselves. Just as important however, it allowed them to control an area's people, food and other material. As noted above, Main Force VC and PAVN typically spent only a small number of days a year fighting. Most of the time was spent in area control, which provided recruits, food and other resources. Control of an area was achieved because the moving VC/PAVN formations generally kept within striking distance of the civilian population and were thus in a position to harvest intelligence, liquidate opposition, intimidate the reluctant, and enforce demands for taxes, labor and other resources.

Movement procedures varied with enemy locations, terrain etc., but generally recon elements from battalions or companies met with local guerrillas or operatives to gain intelligence, map out the terrain ahead, and obtain guides as needed. Security was on a tight basis with soldiers only being informed at the last minute. A movement order was accompanied by a thorough cleanup of the area to hide traces of the unit. Trenches, foxholes and other fortifications were generally camouflaged for later reuse.

Once on the move, an advanced reconnaissance team preceded the main body. Behind the advance troops, came the combat units, headquarters, heavy weapons, combat support soldiers and another combat element. Trailing the formation was a rearguard detachment. The distance between individual men was generally 5–10 meters – less during night movements. Complete radio silence was maintained during a movement, and strict camouflage and concealment procedures applied during day movement.

Recon elements scouted the flanks and rear extensively, especially while crossing obstacles or in enemy-held areas. Most movement was at night. Integral to any movement into a camp was the use of multiple avenues of approach, avoiding predictable patterns that could be exploited by opposing forces. When making an approach march for a planned battle, a long, roundabout route was generally taken, often criss-crossing earlier movements to fool enemy surveillance.

==== Signaling and communications ====
Communications relied heavily on field telephone and runner until the latter stages of the war when mostly conventional forces took the field. A simple signaling system via a series of gunshots was also used to communicate while moving in the forests, with the pattern and sequence of the shots conveying meaning to other PAVN troops. When VC or PAVN did acquire modern equipment via capture or supply, they made numerous attempts at communications deception, imitating US radio transmissions and call signs to lure US/ARVN helicopters and troops into ambushes, or redirecting artillery fire from themselves on to US/ARVN positions via bogus requests for artillery adjustment and support.

=== Fortified camps ===
==== Camp construction ====
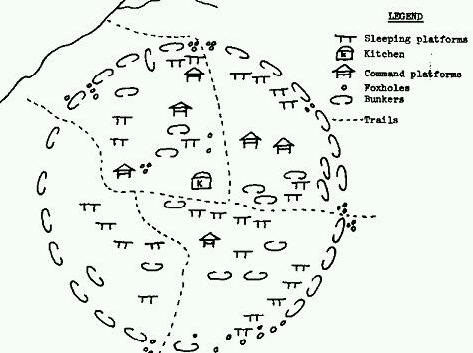
Typical VC/NVA fortified camp. Source: US Army Platoon Leaders Handbook, 1967

Constant movement often brought the VC fighters to vast camp networks, spread out over a wide area. Some of these movements required new construction. Others reoccupied old campsites abandoned temporarily, or prepared ahead of time as part of the movement rotation. Even brief stops whether in the field, forest or village required digging of combat trenches and foxholes. Campsites had several characteristics:

- Defense in depth
- Extensive use of camouflage
- Mutually supporting defensive networks
- Restricted avenues of approach
- Escape routes
- Use of tunnels, bunkers, communication trenches and foxholes

Also important was the requirement that the chosen location be within a single night's march of another camp. Special attention was paid to avenues of approach and withdrawal. VC and PAVN battalions moved independently within their own sectors and along their own routes. A typical battalion might rotate between 20 and 25 campsites, all within a nights march of 3–4 other camps. While a US or ARVN attack might force them to fight, the primary mission was area control.

The standard camp was roughly circular and consisted of 2-lines of fortification, incorporating individual fighting positions, bunkers and trenches. Semi-permanent or permanent base camps contained more elaborate fortification. A typical VC/PAVN battalion generally spread out its companies at one-hour intervals across an area, balancing the need for quick dispersal with opportunity to concentrate as needed.

Camps were not necessarily in remote areas. They were often situated near hamlets, or even within them – with troops taking shelter in individual houses if the village was fully dominated by the guerilla forces. After digging in, telephone wire was run, units positioned and contact made with other surrounding military formations – especially militia and guerrilla fighters. These local units were crucial in warning, diversion and delay of ARVN or US forces if the Main Force element came under attack. PAVN/VC forces generally avoided villages with high canal banks, graveyards or trees because such obstacles hindered observation and gave advancing US and ARVN troops cover. Mines and booby traps were also planted along likely avenues of approach.

==== Camp life and morale ====
Life in camp followed the military routines common to all armies, including early morning reveille, weapons training, building fortifications, duty details assigned individuals and groups, and daily strength and readiness reports required of officers. Typical of all communist armies, a large bloc of time was devoted to "study sessions" where troops were indoctrinated and "criticism and self-criticism" administered. The exploits of outstanding fighters against the enemy were widely publicized and men were urged to emulate them.

Food supplies were, like those of other armies, designed to keep the troops at a certain level of activity rather than be tasty. VC/PAVN fighters received a daily cash allowance for food which they might sometimes use in local markets. They also foraged widely including hunting. Lacking refrigeration, most food was prepared fresh. Rice was the staple. The ingenious Hoang Cam stove was used to prepare meals without flame or smoke being detected, incorporating a long exhaust trench that allowed smoke to gradually disperse into the forests far away from the actual stove.

Recreation was provided by well organized troupes of actors and musicians when feasible, unit papers and radio broadcasts. As in all things, these were monitored by Party cadres to ensure the proper line was disseminated. Medical care was difficult and austere in wartime conditions, and medicines and facilities lacking, nevertheless the highly organized system provided a rudimentary level of care to injured fighters, with field hospitals sometimes located in tunnels, caves and underground bunkers.

=== Defensive tactics ===
VC/PAVN defensive doctrine generally stressed avoidance of extended battle. Unless an enemy sweep, or patrol provoked an engagement, PAVN/VC forces generally lay low until they were ready to initiate their own actions. If an engagement ensued, the typical approach in terms of defense was to delay opposing forces and withdraw as soon as possible, while inflicting maximum casualties before withdrawal. Massive US "search and destroy" sweeps for example, while of unmistakable value in area denial, dispersal of opponents etc., yielded mixed results in the face of such avoidance tactics.

The biggest such operation, Operation Junction City in 1967 for example, involving some 22 US battalions and 4 ARVN battalions and supported by massive air and artillery firepower, only yielded an average of approximately 33 PAVN/VC dead per day, over its 2 months. Such losses were manageable by an opponent that could put tens of thousands of staunch fighters in the field, and reinforce them with more every day. Even more telling, such massive sweeps failed to cripple their targets and deliver the big battles sought by the Americans. The option of initiating contact was still largely in the hands of PAVN/VC units, and their tactics lured powerful US forces away from populated areas, their key base until late in the war.

A key part of the avoidance defensive pattern also involved the intensive use of fortifications and mines. Both served to enable Front forces to escape for another day's fighting, while running up the enemy tab in blood and treasure.

==== Defensive layouts: the two-belt system ====
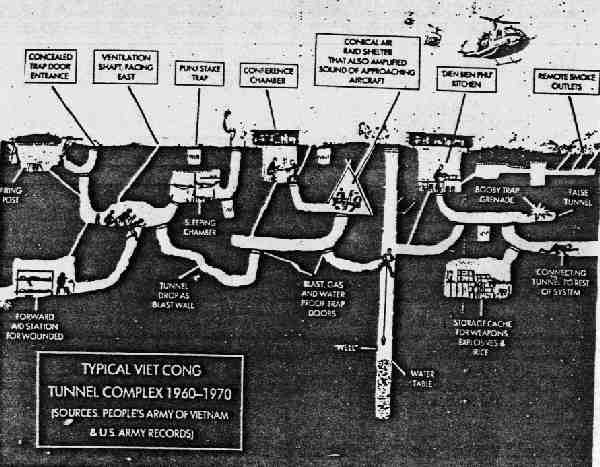
Detailed view of tunnel complex including facilities for medical care (far left)

Defensive positions had to be prepared every time VC/PAVN troops moved to a new destination, with an eye to the suitability of terrain, camouflage and withdrawal routes. Generally a two line system of fortifications was used, about 50–200 meters apart. The lines were typically shaped like an L, U or V to enhance interlocking fields of fire. Individual L-shaped fighting positions were also dug, with bunkers at right angles covered with thick logs and about 2 feet of dirt. Shallow trenches connected many individual bunkers and positions into each belt of the 2-line system. The bunkers provided cover from inevitable US artillery and air attack and the fighting positions allowed crossfire against infantry assaults. The second line of defense was not visible from the first line of positions, and allowed the fighters to fall back, either to escape a heavy bombardment, to continue retreating or to furnish a rallying point for counterattack.

In villages the VC and PAVN followed the same 2-belt approach, placing defenses so they were integrated with village homes and structures. This took advantage of some US Rules of Engagement limiting or delaying the use of heavy weapons in inhabited areas. Another benefit of embedding defenses among civilians was that atrocities could be charged if civilian structures were hit by US or ARVN fire. Numerous dummy positions were also constructed to draw ARVN and American fire. In more remote areas, defensive fortifications were more elaborate, sometimes incorporating a third belt of defenses with stronger bunkers and trench systems. US attacks against such tough positions sought to avoid US casualties by relying upon firepower.

In some circumstances fortifications did not follow the layout scheme described above. Bunkers and fighting holes were scattered more widely to delay attackers and create the psychological impression that they were surrounded on all sides. Lookout posts were often positioned on key trails, routes and likely US helicopter landing zones. To enhance their mobility during a defensive battle, numerous air-raid shelters, bunkers and trenches were pre-built in advance around an area of operations. This involved an enormous amount of labor but proved their value in maneuvering under ARVN/US attacks. Foxholes dug by VC troops during the victorious Battle of Ap Bac are testimony to the insurgents' almost religious dedication to field fortifications. The holes were dug so deep that a man could stand inside. Excavation of dirt was from the rear, hiding telltale traces of the digging. Only a direct hit by an artillery shell or bomb could kill troops inside such holes. Behind the line of foxholes, the VC utilized and improved an irrigation ditch, allowing them concealed movement, communication and transmission of supplies on foot or by sampan. Most of these fighting positions were invisible from the air.

==== Booby traps and mines ====
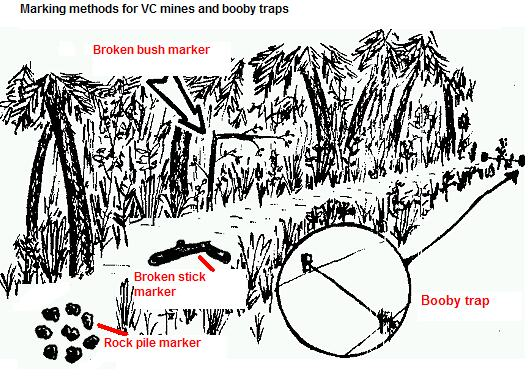
VC 'scatter-site' mining and booby traps inflicted significant casualties. Typical marking methods for friendly forces included broken sticks, saplings or groups of pebbles

Booby traps and mines caused immense psychological pressure on US and ARVN troops and also inflicted numerous casualties. By 1970 for example, some 11% of fatalities and 17% of injuries inflicted on US troops were caused by booby traps and mines. Identified by a variety of markers for friendly forces, these devices slowed operations, diverted resources towards security and clearance activity, damaged equipment and poisoned relations between soldiers and the surrounding civilian population.

===== Booby traps =====
Booby traps ranged from the simple to the complex. Non-explosive traps included the well-known sharpened punji stake coated in excrement, and mounted on sapling triggers and placed in shallow, covered pits. Stakes were deployed where infantry would walk or fling themselves to avoid attack such as roadside trenches, or behind logs. Another type of trap was a spiked mud ball that swung down on its victim after a trip wire release, impaling him. Other impalement devices included bamboo whips and triggered sapling spikes. Bows with poisoned arrows were also used.

Explosive booby traps were also employed, some command detonated by hidden observers. They ranged from single bullet cartridge traps, to grenades, to dud bombs and shells. Anti-vehicle traps ranged from mines to buried artillery rounds. Helicopter traps were often deployed in trees surrounding a potential landing zone, triggered by an observer, or the rotor's wash. Booby traps were also made from American and ARVN trash in the field. Discarded ration cans, for example, were loaded with grenades that had pins pulled partially – the other end connected to tripwire. The sides of the can held the pin in place until the tripwire was activated. Discarded batteries and communications wire was also used – the batteries hooked to the waste wire, providing an ignition current to spark the charge of dud or discarded mortar/artillery rounds.

===== Mines: the VC substitute for artillery =====
Mines caused even more damage than booby traps. According to one US Army history:

"The enemy employed "nuisance mining," that is, scattering mines throughout an area rather than in well-defined minefields, on a scale never before encountered by U.S. forces. Mines and booby traps were usually installed at night by trained personnel who had detailed knowledge of the terrain. Through ingenious techniques in mine warfare, the Viet Cong successfully substituted mines and booby traps for artillery.

Instead of conventional minefields covered by fire, the enemy hindered or prevented the use of supply roads and inhibited off-the-road operations by planting explosive devices in indiscriminate patterns. While he benefited directly by causing combat casualties, vehicle losses and delays in tactical operations, equally important was the psychological effect. Just the knowledge that a mine or booby trap could be placed anywhere slowed combat operations and forced allied troops to clear almost the entire Vietnam road net every day.

==== Hugging techniques, timings, counterattacks and withdrawals ====
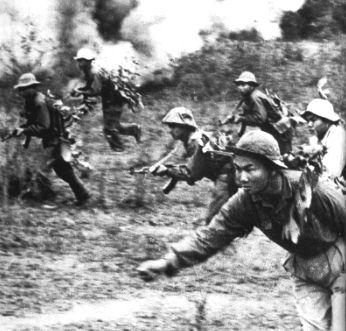
PAVN troops 1967

The VC/PAVN fighters sought to neutralize US and ARVN firepower by "hugging" enemy troops (Vietnamese: Nắm thắt lưng địch mà đánh)—fighting so close that artillery or aircraft strikes had to be restrained for fear of friendly fire casualties. This tactic was created by General Nguyễn Chí Thanh after the Battle of Ia Drang in November 1965. Vigorous counterattacks were also made, particularly against weaker ARVN formations. Typically, VC/PAVN troops in a defensive or ambush position held their fire or maneuvered until US troops were very close before opening fire. This initiated the "hug" method. Since their enemies would generally draw back upon contact and rely on supporting fires, front troops moved with them, "hanging on the belt."

Actions against enemy forces were often initiated in the latter part of the day, with impending nightfall providing favorable conditions for withdrawal. When surrounded, the Main Force VC and especially the PAVN fought tenaciously, but usually with an eye towards withdrawal. Great efforts were made in recovering bodies, a psychological warfare measure that denied opponents the satisfaction of viewing enemy dead.

Invariably, VC and PAVN units sought to withdraw if conditions were unfavorable, and camps and base areas were abandoned without sentiment if they became untenable. Rearguard detachments, mined routes, and diversionary attacks formed part of the retreat. The existence of cross-border sanctuaries in Laos, Cambodia and North Vietnam, where US ground troops could not follow greatly aided safe withdrawal of PAVN/VC formations.

There was a withdrawal scheme for all operations whether defensive or offensive. Escape and exit routes were pre-planned and concealed in advance, with later regrouping at a planned assembly point. Common techniques for withdrawal included the following:

- Fragmenting—splitting up in small groups when under attack, especially when trying to break through an encirclement.
- Dispersing—generally used when discovered. VC/PAVN troops disperse, sometimes dropping packs to delay enemy forces who stop to inspect them.
- Hiding—VC/PAVN troops spent a massive amount of time constructing fortifications and hiding places. Withdrawal movements frequently utilized these hideouts, often deep tunnel networks.
- Deceiving—conducting diversionary attacks to deceive and draw away enemy forces and thus facilitate the withdrawal.
- Delaying—use of rearguard units to delay pursuing forces. Delay units were sometimes used to set up enemy forces for an ambush, where the pursued turned on their pursuers.

==== Defensive measures against US aircraft ====
While their American opponents enjoyed air superiority, PAVN forces continuously challenged them, deploying an impressive array of ordnance to liquidate enemies from the air. The sophisticated missile defense system built with Soviet and Chinese assistance is well known, but PAVN made extensive use of anti-aircraft guns and even volume firing by ordinary soldiers. At the lowest level, one study noted that PAVN gunners were trained to use small arms against all types of aircraft and special firing cells were established that could shoot up to 1000 rounds in 3 to 5 seconds at fast-moving jets. The volume of such firepower made life hazardous at the low levels for US planes, forcing them to move to higher altitudes, where the specialized anti-aircraft cannon took over. Special "bait" areas, ringed with hidden anti-aircraft batteries were also established to lure US aircraft. Barrage firing of many guns, mixed at various levels was also sometimes effective. Sensitive areas, such as Hanoi, were the most heavily defended. Most US aircraft losses were caused by heavy automatic weapons and 14.5mm, 37mm, 57mm and 85mm anti-aircraft guns. Flak batteries forced some US aircraft even higher, where they would be within reach of the deadly SA-2 missile batteries. Positioning automatic weapons at treetop level also aided in the struggle against US helicopters. Air losses were to cause a dip in the morale of American pilots, some of whom felt they were being called to risk their lives against targets of relatively little value. Appeals to US Defense Secretary McNamara to remove restrictions on more lucrative targets were often drastically pared down or vetoed. The inability of US airpower to take a decisive toll on PAVN forces is testimony not only to US failures, but to the tenacity of the ordinary PAVN soldier in direct combat with aerial enemies and in the massive effort spent in constructing sophisticated fortifications and tunnel systems.

==== Fighting American airmobile operations ====
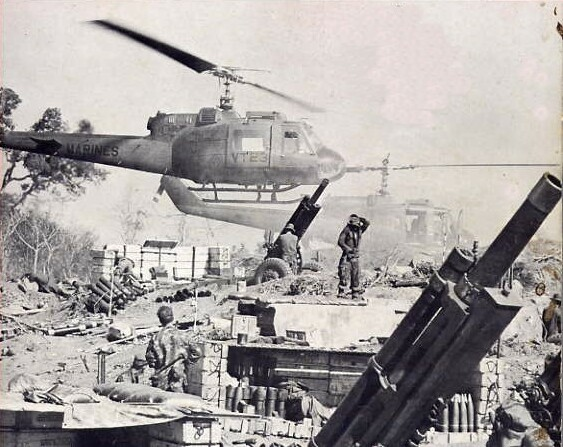
Versatile helicopters enabled US firebases to be quickly established. When surrounded by superior air-mobile forces communist troops often fought delaying actions until nightfall, facilitating a breakout in the darkness. Special units were sometimes tasked to probe US encirclements for weak spots.

US forces sometimes employed sophisticated airmobile tactics, using integrated helicopter landings, artillery support, and troop insertions to surround enemy contacts and close off escape routes. The outstanding mobility of the helicopter made this possible, and these versatile machines could be sent into action in several configurations (troop transport, gunship, med-evac, heavy lift and supply). Helicopters allowed transport and deployment of infantry, artillery, medical, and supply elements to almost any location, presenting a formidable instrument that enhanced American and ARVN operations. When combined with other aerial elements such as fixed wing air support this combat power was multiplied, and opened up a whole new dimension of operational maneuver. But helicopters also had several vulnerabilities. They required a vast and expensive "logistical tail" of maintenance, fuel, munitions and bases. No nation except the US could afford such expense- fielding some 12,000 machines in Vietnam, almost half of which were shot down or lost due to accidents. The ability of helicopters to move men and material anywhere was impressive but also meant US and ARVN troops in some instances were heavily dependent on them. Destruction of the helicopter lifeline could derail an operation or maneuver, and the need to air-transport men and material to remote locations meant every new arrival of medevac, supply, transport or troop flights gave the VC/PAVN opportunities to cripple missions and machines. Helicopters were also very vulnerable to heavy machine guns, light AA artillery, Man-portable air-defense systems like the SA-7 and even concentrated small arms fire. According to some historians of airpower, costs were sometimes not commensurate with gains, and US airmobile operations might boil down to hugely expensive machines and their support systems chasing a handful of teenagers or second-string militiamen armed with cheap rifles.

===== Anti-guerrilla sweeps in populated areas =====
During anti-guerrilla sweeps, by some US units like the 9th Infantry Division, contact was first established with VC/PAVN forces via air or foot patrol, or planned raids on locations identified by intelligence sources. Usually conducted in daytime at the brigade level, planned strikes would allocate artillery and helicopter assets to battalions tasked with the fight. Artillery elements positioned firebases early to create an umbrella of steel over the proposed zone of battle. Helicopter assets were assigned and divided into 3 segments- light scout helicopters for reconnaissance, heavily armed gunships for firepower and larger "slicks", or troop transports for the infantry. The force commander, sometimes in a helicopter, was in constant communication with all elements via rUHF, FM and field radio as needed.

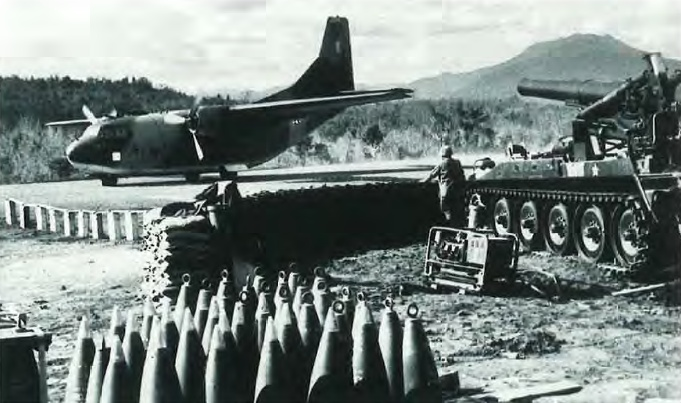
Tactical Airlift- Base 3 Tango, Vietnam 1966.

As the American operation commenced, light scout helicopters flew ahead of the strike force at low level to detect opponents or draw their fire. Above the scouts, the helicopter gunships would lurk, ready to pounce on enemy movement, fire or fortifications. Behind and below the gunships came the "slicks." These transport choppers would sometimes carry "people sniffer" technology designed to detect chemical traces or fumes left from human waste, smoke or sweat- indicators that PAVN/VC troops might be hiding nearby. People sniffing often required steady low altitude flying to improve reliability of results. Once PAVN/VC were detected, hiding places might be saturated with Tear gas. If flushed out, the enemy was attacked by the gunships, and the transports began to land infantry to surround the target and seal off escape routes. Artillery firebases would then begin their fires to smash the opposition, bombard exit routes and provide cover for the American infantry. US troops on such operations did not usually drive home attacks with direct assault, but sealed the enemy in a ring, while he was worked over by artillery and gunship strikes. Fixed-wing aircraft were on call. This "surround and pound" approach substituted metal for men and lowered US casualties, but in turn caused massive noncombatant civilian casualties.

PAVN/VC forces deployed several countermeasures against the American tactics. Avoidance and concealment was a primary method- sometimes made more difficult by the "sniffer" technology. But chemical detection was not always reliable- and could be thrown off by the use of animal decoys, urine bucket diversions, or was affected by wind, rain and other factors. PAVN/VC units also built their fortifications in the high brush along canal banks and streams- providing a route of easier escape from the American attack. These locations could be a double-edged sword: they gave clear fields of fire against American infantry but the adjacent rice paddies sometimes created convenient enemy landing zones, and the water escape routes could become bottlenecks. Pre-built fortifications and trenches helped shield the communist forces from annihilation as the ring closed in, and previously prepared ground, laced with booby-traps also delayed enemy forces. If there was enough advance warning, PAVN/VC forces would prepare kill zones near or in likely landing spots. Trees could also make effective defensive positions. Booby traps were laid on trails and rice paddy dikes, and in the forests in a random pattern, and often caused multiple casualties to American troops.

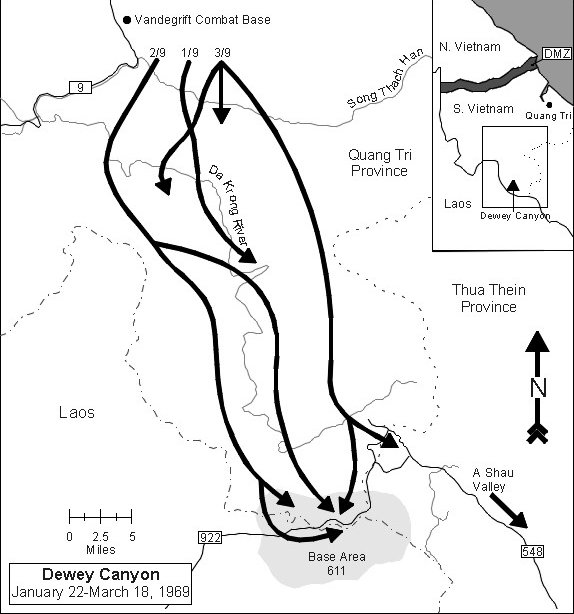
Fast-moving airmobile operations in Operation Dewey Canyon confronted NVA regulars.

The primary tactic after being surrounded was to delay until nightfall, after which breakouts would begin. Large formations were broken down into smaller units to facilitate escape and a rendezvous was pre-planned in advance. Special units were deployed to probe the encirclement, looking for weak points, and decoy units were held ready for action to occupy American forces once the breakouts began. Breakouts could be made with diversions while bodies of troops slipped away, or strength could be concentrated on a weak spot, providing enough local superiority to penetrate the American encirclement and disperse. Escaping units would link up later at designated marshaling points. Harassment and diversionary tactics also paid dividends. As noted by some airpower historians, relatively small bodies of local fighters armed with inexpensive rifles, could divert and tie down expensive and massive allocations of men, material and time deployed by more sophisticated opponents.

Ironically, the very efficiency and convenience of firebases, could at times aid PAVN/VC forces. In some areas, US troops, often used as "bait" to draw out an enemy response, developed "firebase psychosis"- a reluctance to move too far away from the covering artillery of their firebases. As a result, combat movement and operational flexibility was hampered and more mobile PAVN/VC forces attacked, broke contact, maneuvered around and eluded their opponents. Many firebases were also totally dependent on helicopters for construction, resupply and evacuation and attacks against these fortresses could at times force their abandonment.

===== Main force confrontation =====
PAVN/VC forces also faced American airmobile attacks in remoter areas, around their base camps and border sanctuaries. In these encounters PAVN regulars and VC main-force units confronted their opponents, which sometimes included airlifted ARVN elements. Typically, such airmobile operations involved preparation of fire support bases, carved out of forested terrain. Suitable areas (usually on high ground) were selected and heavily bombarded with artillery and airstrikes, then US engineers and security troops landed to commence construction of fortifications, bunkers, artillery emplacements and helicopter landing pads. The ability of helicopters to transport all the needed men and heavy equipment to almost any location gave American arms tremendous power and flexibility. Several of these firebases could be built relatively quickly and deliver devastating mutually supporting fire within a combat zone. Under the artillery umbrella, Marine and Army infantry deployed for combat. The versatility of helicopters enabled such forces to be resupplied and maneuvered to numerous points on the field of battle. Firebases could also be "leapfrogged" or shifted in response to an advance or operational needs.

Against such methods the PAVN/VC used a variety of approaches. If the objective was to cause attrition, PAVN regulars would sometimes fight directly with their opponents using conventional tactics, particularly on the DMZ against the US Marines, and in remote border areas near Laos and Cambodia. Such attrition objectives were sometimes part of the North's overall strategy of drawing the Americans into remote areas, and away from key population clusters dominated or contested by the VC. Some American postwar memoirs comment favorably on the bravery and tactical discipline of the PAVN in these encounters. To stem an advance from airmobile enemies PAVN troops sometimes held their ground in prepared fortifications, buying time for their comrades to maneuver elsewhere. PAVN forces also attempted with limited success to attack the quickly constructed firebases from which the lethal firepower issued. Gaps between maneuvering US units were infiltrated and attacks mounted. Ambushes were also executed. Another tactic was fighting close to US units, so close that deadly American firepower from fixed bases was discouraged for fear of hitting their own troops. Tactical airstrikes in support of ambushed Americans units, were also met by well-timed PAVN pullbacks from the contact zone. If things were going badly, PAVN forces withdrew to cross-border sanctuaries, where American ground forces were forbidden to follow. The fast-moving US operations, where there was no time for the usual months of communist initiative and rehearsed preparations, could catch PAVN off-guard, and casualties against US forces could be heavy. In Operation Dewey Canyon for example, US after-action reports claim some 1,617 PAVN killed, for a loss of 121 Marines killed and the capture of hundreds of tons of munitions, equipment and supplies.

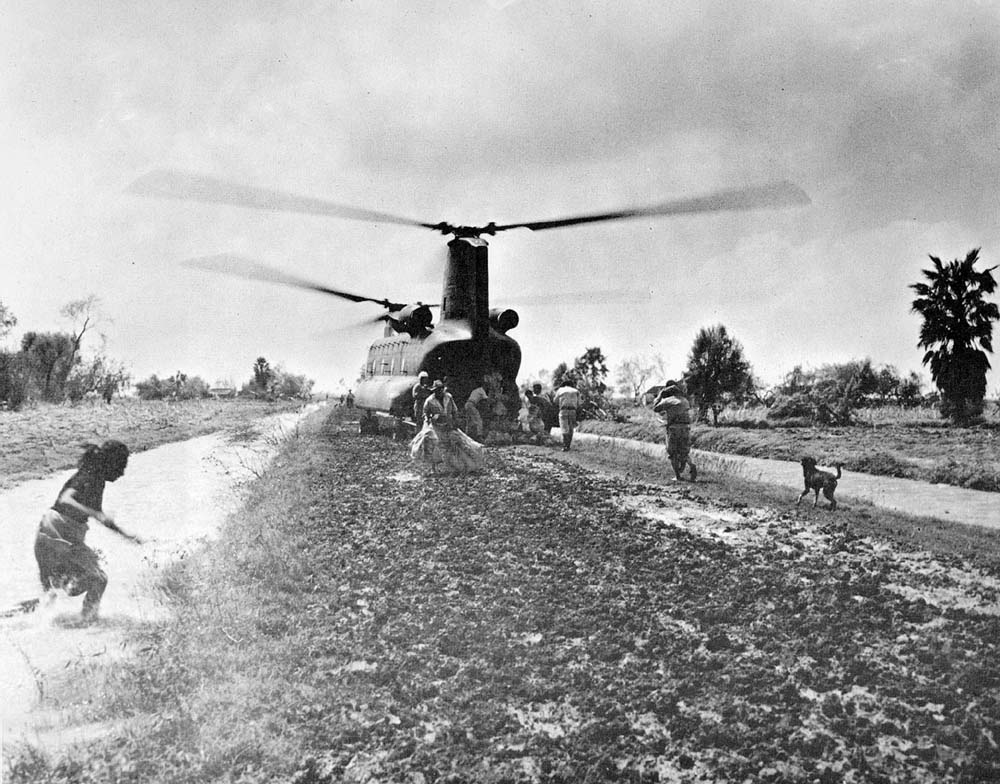
Workhorse of heavy lift and firebase construction- the Boeing CH-47 Chinook

Against ARVN opponents, PAVN had greater success. In the Operation Lam Son 719, ARVN troops were inserted by helicopter, covered by US airmobile, road advance operations and massive aerial firepower. The operation met heavy resistance, including intense antiaircraft fire. ARVN air insertions took them to the outskirts of Tchepone, but numerous helicopters were shot down or damaged. PAVN flanking tactics and ambushes also mauled the ARVN infantry battalions. US/ARVN reports claimed some 13,000 PAVN deaths and destruction of tons of material, but the ARVN was forced to withdraw, a maneuver that turned into a humiliating rout, salvaged only by unrelenting American airpower. Some 105 US helicopters were lost and an additional 615 damaged. The PAVN base area at Tchepone was back in business within a week. The vital role of sanctuary areas which could be developed in depth into strong bases was again illustrated.

===== Protracted war and staying power =====
American airmobile tactics caused substantial casualties to the VC and PAVN in thousands of such confrontations, but the North's strategy of attritional, protracted war, aided by plentiful manpower, was designed to absorb these losses, while wearing down their opponents over time. Successful air-mobile tactics also failed to address what happened after the mobile force and their helicopters departed. The population was often still left unsecured, subject once more to communist control, intimidation and infiltration. ARVN follow-up action might continue to be ineffective. Cross-border sanctuary routes were still open, and the bulk of the networks of tunnels, base camps and fortification honeycombing a region usually survived. Once their opponents had left, communist forces eventually regrouped, replaced their losses, and returned.

=== Offensive tactics: doctrine and planning ===
In offensive operations, the PAVN/VC typically sought to wear their opponents down by thousands of small attacks, each one gradually reducing enemy strength. Winning and holding specific blocks of territory was not as important as wearing down the enemy in accordance with Mao's dictum: "To win territory is no cause for joy, to lose territory is no cause for sorrow." Bigger set-piece assaults on installations and bases as well as ambushes were sometimes executed, but the general pattern was one of protracted, attritional warfare, conducted by relatively small formations over a wide area. This meant absorbing large numbers of casualties, but both manpower and time were plentiful.

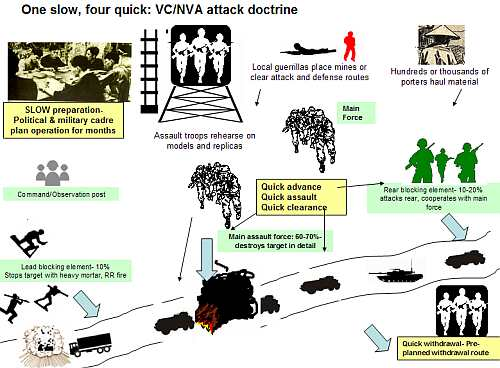

==== Attack planning ====
Planning for attacks was a careful, deliberate process, that could take many months. Below is an outline of some considerations and actions involved.

Attack criteria and approval: The political dimensions of the attack were carefully considered, such as the timing of an election in the enemy camp, or the appointment of certain government officials. Planning involved a coordinated effort by military and logistics staff and the all-important political operatives, the party cadres who had the last word. Proposals for an operation were first sent up the chain of command. Depending on the scale of the planned operation, an idea to attack a certain village post might float up from Provincial, to Zone, to Interzone levels. Great stress was placed on a successful outcome that would be beneficial in terms of actual military results or propaganda. Numerical superiority was deemed essential.

Preliminary recon: If approved for further study, reconnaissance teams would case the area, analyzing political, logistics and military issues. Information gleaned from informers and sympathizers was joined to data from direct reconnaissance via patrols, infiltration or probing attacks. The analysis was comprehensive, and might involve size and composition of enemy forces, avenues of approach and withdrawal, civilian morale, hit lists of suspected traitors or troublesome dissenters who did not support the Revolution, available civilian labor to support logistics, detailed location of individual walls, ditches or fences and a host of other factors, both political and military.

Rehearsals for the attack: If the objective was deemed feasible along political and military lines, detailed planning for the actual operation began, including construction of sand tables, and string and stick mock-ups of the target. Main Force or regular units tasked with the assault were selected and rehearsed. Each phase of the attack was carefully reviewed and rehearsed, including actions before opening fire, actions during fire, and actions taken upon withdrawal. Numerous postponements and changes might be undertaken until conditions and preparations were judged right to launch the assault.

Logistics and security: Logistics formations might prepare coffins, pre-position medical or porter teams, and carefully tabulate the amount of ammunition needed for the operation. Guerrilla elements and laborers began to move supplies and matériel forward to support the impending battle. Security surrounding the operation was usually very tight with units only being informed at the last feasible moment.

Echelons of attack: Depending on the complexity of the attack, numerous sub-divisions might be involved. Local guerrillas might conduct certain preliminary tasks, such as diversionary attacks, or clearance or denial (via mining, booby traps etc.) of certain areas for movement purposes. Sappers might be tasked with opening the assault via infiltration and demolition of key objectives. A main force might swing into action once the sappers commenced their action. A blocking force might be deployed to ambush relief troops rushing to the battle area.

==== Attack doctrine: "one slow, four quick" ====
The discussion on PAVN/VC offensive methods below is adapted from Bernard B. Fall, Street without Joy; Michael Lee Lanning and Dan Cragg, Inside the VC and the NVA; and United States Army Center of Military History: Vietnam Studies.

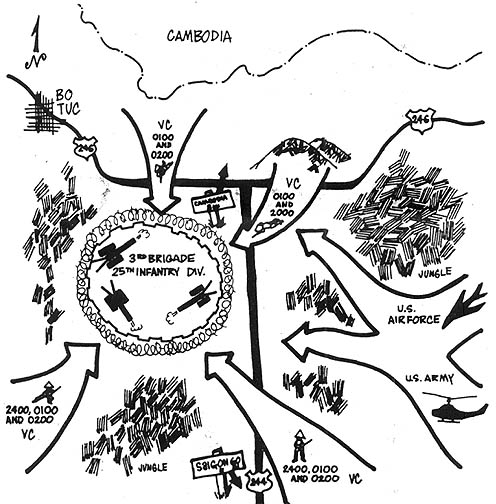
Some VC attacks were repulsed with heavy losses. A battle sketch of a 4-pronged VC attack against the US 25th Infantry Division at Soiu Cut, 1968 is shown here

Attacks were invariably characterized by adherence to the principle of 'one slow, four quick' – a doctrine which prevailed in both attack and defense. In offensive operations the 'quick attack' was further broken down to incorporate 'three strongs' – strong fight, strong assault and strong pursuit. Presented in sequence the doctrine can be summarized as follows:

Slow Plan – This involved a steady but low-key logistical build up in forward supply areas, being positioned ahead of the fighting forces to make a solid base for the operation. The degree of planning and preparation necessary to undertake a large operation could take as long as 6 months and often included numerous 'rehearsals'.

- Quick Advance – This was a rapid movement forward, generally after a circuitous approach march meant to confuse the enemy. Once all the units in the operation were on track, a quick advance was usually made in small and inconspicuous groups to a forward staging area from where the attack would be launched.
- Quick Attack – Here the attacking forces would be concentrated at the weakest point of the target as identified by prior reconnaissance. The duration of an attack could often be measured in minutes. Surprise was essential and large volumes of fire were poured on the target. Phase 2 of the attack involved the three strongs:

- Strong fight – an attempt to achieve and exploit the element of surprise

- Strong Assault – against a pre-arranged position using concentration of force, effort and mass to overwhelm the defense.

- Strong pursuit – the attacking force's reserves would be committed to exploit the breaches in the targets defenses so as to deliver a decisive blow

- Quick Clearance – The attacking force would rapidly re-organize and police the battlefield so as to remove weapons and casualties and was pre-planned to prevent confusion on the objective
- Quick Withdrawal – Involved a quick egress from the battle area to a pre-arranged rendezvous point where the attackers would again break down into smaller groups to continue their dispersal.

==== Anatomy of an attack: Lima Site 85 Radar station – Laos 1968 ====
Tactical map of attack on Lima 85 radar site. NVA regulars, special forces and local guerrillas collaborated in the assault.

The careful methods of PAVN forces are illustrated in the successful attack against the US Air Force's Lima Site 85 TACAN radar navigation facility in Laos, in March 1968. Situated on a mountain peak that was considered too tough to assault, the facilities were manned by a small force of USAF technicians on top, and about 1,000 Hmong and Thai irregulars deployed further down the slopes. PAVN commandos however successfully climbed the mountain, killing or dispersing most of the guards and US airmen at the peak, while a larger follow-on echelon of PAVN and Pathet Lao assaulted the rest of the mountain slopes below. The outgunned and outnumbered Hmong and Thai irregulars were defeated and PAVN/VC forces held the site despite several days under counterattack by US aircraft.

A full after-action report by PAVN was translated in 1998 and along with other US reports, furnishes numerous details about offensive tactics. These include extensive preliminary recon and rehearsals, vetting and clearance by Communist Party operatives, numerical superiority at the point of attack (3,000 versus 1,000), a secure advance to the objective (avoiding or hiding from civilian traffic), detailed sub-division of tasks for each assault element, rapid movement once the battle began, and cooperation between special forces (sappers), regulars, and local guerrillas. This operation did not involve the typical quick withdrawal however. The attackers dug in on the site and defended it against counterattack, a pattern that occurred when the PAVN/VC wanted to inflict maximum casualties, or achieve some political or propaganda objective, or control a particular area.

In this case, the radar station helped guide US bombers – including the devastating B-52s, and its capture was also a strong propaganda bonus demonstrating PAVN/Pathet Lao strength in Laos to the local people. The base was isolated and superior forces could be concentrated on it, maximizing chances for success – a key consideration in a PAVN offensive operation. The raid also illustrated another method of neutralizing US airpower- attack its support facilities and bases on the ground. Subsequent attempts by Royal Lao Army forces to retake the area were only partially successful. The mountain peak was never recaptured.

=== Ambush techniques ===
The VC/NVA prepared the battlefield carefully. Siting automatic weapons at treetop level for example helped shoot down several US helicopters during the Battle of Dak To, 1967

The terrain for the ambush had to meet strict criteria:

- provide concealment to prevent detection from the ground or air
- enable ambush force to deploy, encircle and divide the enemy
- allow for heavy weapons emplacements to provide sustained fire
- enable the ambush force to set up observation posts for early detection of the enemy
- permit the secret movement of troops to the ambush position and the dispersal of troops during withdrawal

One important feature of the ambush was that the target units should 'pile up' after being attacked, thus preventing them any easy means of withdrawal from the kill zone and hindering their use of heavy weapons and supporting fires. Terrain was usually selected which would facilitate this and slow down the enemy. The terrain around the ambush site which was not favorable to the ambushing force, or which offered some protection to the target, was heavily mined and booby trapped or pre-registered for mortars.

The PAVN/VC ambush formations consisted of:

- lead-blocking element
- main-assault element
- rear-blocking element
- observation posts
- command post

Other elements might also be included if the situation demanded, such as a sniper screen along a nearby avenue of approach to delay enemy reinforcement.

When deploying into an ambush site, the PAVN first occupied several observation posts, placed to detect the enemy as early as possible and to report on the formation it was using, its strength and firepower, as well as to provide early warning to the unit commander. Usually one main OP and several secondary OP's were established. Runners and occasionally radios were used to communicate between the OP's and the main command post. The OP's were located so that they could observe enemy movement into the ambush and often they would remain in position throughout the ambush in order to report routes of reinforcement and withdrawal by the enemy as well as his maneuver options. Frequently the OP's were reinforced to squad size and served as flank security. The command post was situated in a central location, often on terrain which afforded it a vantage point overlooking the ambush site.

Reconnaissance elements observing a potential ambush target on the move generally stayed 300–500 meters away. Sometimes a "leapfrogging" recon technique was used. Surveillance units were echeloned one behind the other. As the enemy drew close to the first, it fell back behind the last recon team, leaving an advance group in its place. This one in turn fell back as the enemy again closed the gap, and the cycle rotated. This method helped keep the enemy under continuous observation from a variety of vantage points, and allowed the recon groups to cover one another.

==== Ambush considerations ====
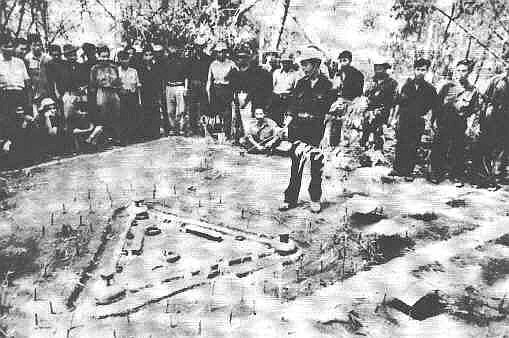
Careful rehearsals marked attack preparations. Here a sand table model of an objective is studied.

The size and sophistication of an ambush varied from hasty meeting engagements, to full scale, carefully planned, regimental sized ambushes that included forces sufficient to encircle the enemy in the kill zone. In instances where smaller units didn't have enough troops to stage a complete five-element ambush they would set up one of the preferred ambush types and avoided close assaulting the enemy.

The preferred time for ambushes was just before dark. Enemy units were often deliberately delayed by the deployment of small patrols or snipers which harassed it. Roads and bridges to the rear of the enemy unit would also be sabotaged or mined to prevent withdrawal. This limited the enemy's use of air support and the deployment of reinforcements. It often also resulted in the ambushed unit being pinned in place for the night and having to set up a defensive perimeter in a hostile area.

All ambushes, in keeping with universal ambush doctrine, were intended to inflict maximum casualties on the enemy and to allow the ambushing force to withdraw before effective fire could be returned.

==== Ambush types ====
The PAVN/VC favored seven types of ambushes; Mine, Bloody Nose, Flank, L-shaped, Maneuver, V-shaped, and Z-shaped. The following discussion is adapted from the MACV monograph (Counterinsurgency Lessons Learned No 60, 1966) and from the US Army's Handbook: ("What A Platoon Leader Should Know about the Enemy's Jungle Tactics," 1967)

Mine Ambush. This depended on the use of command-detonated mines which were triggered by hidden troops who held a detonating device connected to the demolitions by electrical wire. Mine ambush kill zones might also include punji traps or other homemade traps, land mines and natural obstacles. However, the ambush was always triggered by electrically detonating a mine, when enemy troops moved within the mine's killing range.

Bloody Nose Ambush. Used by small units against larger enemy forces as a means of harassment, delay and disruption. By positioning the ambush to enfilade an avenue of approach, the PAVN/VC obtained more effective results. Minefields, mantraps and booby traps were placed along both sides of the trail and perpendicular to it. As the enemy unit came under fire and attempted to maneuver right or left to close with the ambushers, the protective barriers would inflict casualties. As soon as the ambushing element realized that the enemy had advanced into, and taken casualties from, the mine/trap line, the ambushers withdrew to another pre-selected site where they might repeat the maneuver.

Flank or Linear Ambush. This was one of the simplest to set up and operate and was most commonly used by the PAVN. It was also easy to get into and away from quickly. The ambush position was laid parallel to the target area. Mines or other obstacles were placed on the other side of the ambush site. Upon command, fire was brought to bear on the kill zone from multiple, overlapping firing positions. The linear ambush pumped bullets into the flank of a surprised enemy column.

The 'L' Ambush. L-shaped ambushes included the most effective aspects of both the 'Bloody Nose' and Linear ambush. The short end, or base, of the 'L' was positioned so that at least one machine gun could fire straight down the kill zone, enfilading it. Parallel to the kill zone and tied into the 'L' was a second, flanking ambush.

The L-shaped ambush could also provide its own flank security. The base of the 'L' might be placed along either flank of the ambush position, not to fire into the kill zone, but to ambush enemy units that were attempting to flank the main ambush position along obvious avenues of approach.

In some situations the enemy located a reserve unit in line with the vertical bar of the 'L' forming a 'T' ambush. After the ambush was sprung, the attacker maneuvered his reserves to block the enemy line of withdrawal. The reserves either close assaulted or set up another ambush along the first linear obstacle to the immediate rear of the kill zone.

The Maneuver Ambush. This was usually directed against a road bound column of vehicles. The PAVN/VC usually sprang it from high ground and near a bend in the road, which allowed cover and longer fields of fire for automatic weapons. Weapons frequently opened fire from positions within forty yards of the road or less.

A road bend was included in the kill zone so that the end of the column was out of sight of the head of the column when the ambush was sprung. Interruption of a column's front-to-rear line of sight increased the likelihood that the head and tail of the column would split and try to fight separately.

The ambush was initiated by a small element striking the head of an enemy column and stopping it by fire. Then the main body would attack the column from the rear and/or flank, fragmenting it and rolling it up. The two strikes were timed close enough together so that the target column was engaged from both ends before it could deploy and face toward either danger.

The 'V' Ambush. Positioned with its open mouth toward the enemy advance, this was a favorite of the VC. It was used in both fairly open terrain as well as forests. The ambushers, in good concealment along the legs of the 'V', would wait until the enemy point had passed and then creep close to the trail. The 'V' ambush was virtually undetectable by enemy point or flank security until at least a portion of the enemy force was in the kill zone. Enfilading fire was often directed down the enemy axis of advance, and interlocking fire from each leg across the 'V'. The 'V' ambush also lent itself to the use of controlled mines and booby traps.

The 'Z' Ambush. Usually laid along a road, the 'Z' ambush was both effective and confusing to the unit being ambushed. This complicated ambush was usually well planned with low bunkers lining the kill zone, often prepared months prior to the ambush. The ambush position was only occupied after word was received that an enemy battalion or larger unit would be using the road, which passed through the ambush site.

The long end of the 'Z' ambush was located on one side of a trail or road enabling the ambushers to employ both enfilading and flanking fire. It was also placed to neutralize attempts to flank the ambush from nearly every direction. Ambushing units deployed along the two short ends of the 'Z' could fire in either direction. The 'Z' ambush was dangerous to ambushers because ambush elements could easily fire into each other.

==== "Bait" tactics in ambush and harassment encounters ====
===== VC/PAVN "bait" tactics =====
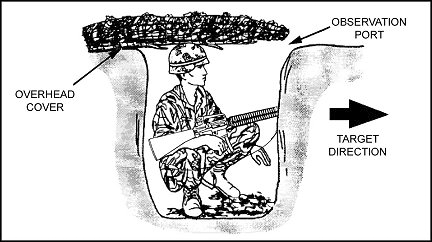
Spider holes were used both offensively and defensively

Numerous VC/PAVN actions were quick, harassment affairs- firing a few mortar or artillery rounds and then disappearing. But others involved detailed planning and execution. These offensive and defensive tactics often involved luring ARVN and US troops into a maze of concealed fortifications, or into ambush positions, where they could be bled before the PAVN/VC forces withdrew. Initial positions were sometimes made to appear deliberately weak, including unmanned bunkers and light sniper-type resistance to bait enemy forces inside the killing zone. In the meantime, more lethal elements maneuvered and concentrated inside the fortified complex to inflict maximum damage. Less elaborate than the fortified bunker complexes were individual "spider holes" – one-man excavations, some 2 feet wide by 4–5 feet deep, with a vegetation-covered lid, carefully camouflaged to be invisible from the air, or even foot-infantry several yards away. One US Marine memoir describes 12 such spider holes strung along both sides of a road, covered with grass and then dirt. As a US convoy passed, the PAVN popped out of these hideaways and opened fire, pinning down the entire column. Supporting mortars behind the spider holes hammered the trapped Americans for several hours before the PAVN pulled out.

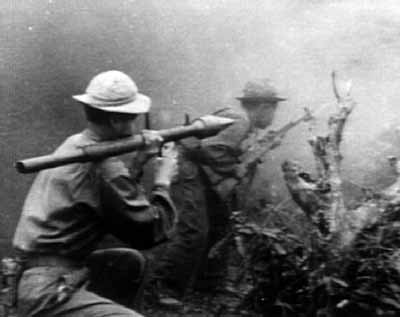
NVA troops- 1968

Forested terrain offered ideal environments for such methods, but ambushes and harassment tactics were also used in civilian areas. Firing a few rounds and withdrawing could not only lure enemy troops into a trap based on civilian structures but could also induce US/ARVN forces to unleash hasty artillery and tactical air strikes after relatively token provocation. This created excessive destruction in the built up areas and helped radicalize the populace against the US/ARVN troops.

Bait tactics exploited the US focus on body counts and its lavish use of firepower, including relatively ineffective Harassment and Interdiction (H&I) fire. One related method was to occupy a hamlet or deploy near it, digging into positions at the treeline on the perimeter of the hamlet for attack or defense. ARVN or US forces would often counterattack by unleashing air and artillery strikes on the community, causing destruction to the persons and property of the civilians they were supposed to be protecting. The damage done, and protected by their dug-in positions, VC and PAVN fighters melted away at their earliest convenience, later repeating the cycle elsewhere.

Another PAVN/VC variant was to let a few advance scouts show themselves briefly to US formations, hoping to lure them forward into a prepared trap. Since US forces were often eager for contact and body counts, this gambit was sometimes successful. One war history for example records the astonishment of an American unit that followed these lures, when above them, they observed what appeared to be the tree canopy moving. The "moving trees" turned out to be camouflaged VC recon elements that signaled for the trap to be sprung from entrenched bunkers, machine guns, and assault elements that hit the Americans from three sides, inflicting heavy casualties before pulling out.

===== American use of "bait" tactics =====
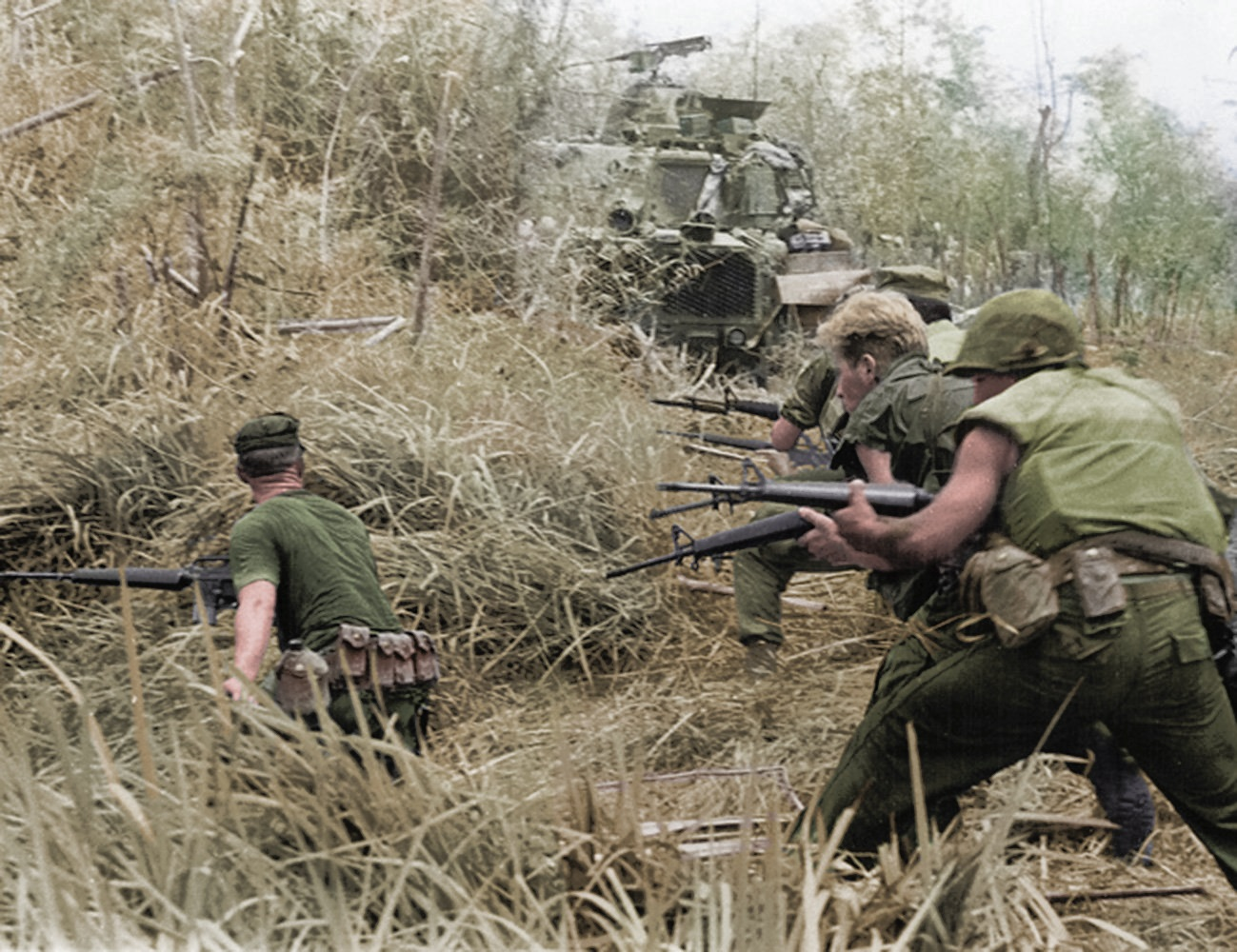
U.S. troops on field operation

American forces also ran their own version of bait tactics, hoping to turn the tables on opponents and increase kill ratios. Whether based on airmobile or more ground oriented "search and destroy" missions, this approach involved using small bodies of US troops as "bait" – inviting communist forces to attack them, after which air and artillery firepower, and follow-on forces held in reserve would presumably crush the attackers. Such tactics were heavily used to obtain the most valued metric- a high body count of enemy. According to US Major General William E. DePuy, commander of the 1st Infantry Division: "The game in the jungle is to send in a small force as bait, let the enemy attack, and be able to react with a larger force in reserve nearby. But if the enemy doesn't want to fight, then the jungle goes off in 360 directions." American superiority and speed in bringing massive quantities of firepower to bear greatly aided this approach and at times, caused heavy communist casualties. However it also put tremendous psychological pressure on the small groups of US soldiers dangled as "bait" before the opposing VC/NVA, who continually whittled down American strength and morale with mining and booby traps, and consistently ambushed US formations in the field. In these encounters, as in the war as a whole, Communist forces still controlled the overall initiative of when and where to strike. Per one historian:

For the individual soldier serving as "bait," the unpredictable nature of search-and-destroy missions took a heavy psychological toll. Constant fear and tension pervaded American patrols with potential threats lurking in every hamlet or rice paddy... Despite Westmoreland's emphasis on finding and killing the enemy, these patrols often consisted of long marches, a great deal of searching, and little fighting.

One US Army primer (Marshall and Hackworth 1967) on fighting Communist forces recognized some of these problems and counseled against hasty reaction fires, or careless advances on contact. Pressure from higher commanders for body counts in pursuit of the US attrition strategy contributed to these outcomes, sometimes making a bad tactical situation worse in the view of these and other authors.

==== Effectiveness of ambushes ====
Simplified view of VC 274th Main Force ambush against US 11th Armored Cavalry.

Ambushes were an important part of VC/NVA offensive effort, though they could sometimes be used defensively to thwart, delay or evade an attack. Against ARVN forces they could cause tremendous damage and close vital arteries of transport. Not all ambushes were fully successful however. While VC/NVA forces typically held the initiative as to where and when to strike, US mobility and firepower sometimes blunted or dispersed their attacks. In a war of attrition however, where the clock was running on impatient US commitments, time favored Communist forces.

The encounter between the 274th VC Main Force Regiment and the US 11th Armored Cavalry shown in the diagram above illustrates several facets of the contending forces. The ambush took place on Highway 1, a vital road artery close to Saigon. There seems to have been careful preparation by Communist forces, including pre-built bunkers to shelter troops from US firepower along the line of retreat. A number of vehicles were destroyed but US airpower broke up the VC concentrations. A follow-up sweep by US forces killed a small number of additional VC but the bulk of them escaped.

VC formations continually refined their techniques. At the Battle of Ong Thanh in 1967 they sprung another ambush, inflicting heavy casualties on American troops. In this encounter the VC used a variety of methods to neutralize dreaded US firepower, including "hugging" or fighting close to US troops. They also moved rapidly parallel to the line of ambush, sliding along its length and thus presenting a harder target for American counter-attack. While US firepower caused significant losses for the VC throughout the conflict, these methods show a force that was learning, adapting, and growing more proficient on the battlefield. Time as always, still favored Communist forces. Sanctuaries in Laos, Cambodia and North Vietnam were always available, forbidden to US ground attack. Inevitably, the ARVN and Americans would have to move on. The VC and NVA regrouped and returned.

=== Sapper attacks ===
==== Sapper organization ====
Sappers were elite assault troops used by both NVA and VC Main Force units. Their speciality was attacking fixed positions

The NVA used special assault troops or sappers for a wide range of missions, sometimes by themselves, or sometimes as spearheads for a main-force echelon. The Viet Cong also deployed sappers particularly after Tet Offensive losses had made large-scale attacks hazardous. Called đặc công by the Vietnamese, sappers were a force economy measure that could deliver a stinging blow. They were an elite group, especially adept at infiltrating and attacking airfields, firebases and other fortified positions. About 50,000 men served in the PAVN as sappers, organized into groups of 100–150 men, further broken down into companies of roughly 30–36 men, with sub-divisions into platoons, squads and cells. Specialist troops such as radiomen, medics, and explosives experts were also attached. Many were volunteers. Sappers were often assigned to larger units (regiments, divisions etc.) – carrying out attacks and recon duties, but could also be organized as independent formations. Sappers trained and rehearsed carefully in all aspects of their craft and made use of a variety of equipment and explosive devices, including captured or abandoned American munitions. Sappers also carried out intelligence missions and could work undercover. One of the sappers in the spectacular 1968 Tet Offensive attack against the US Embassy for example, was once a driver to the US Ambassador.

==== Sapper techniques ====
Assault planning. As with most VC Main Force/PAVN operations, the general pattern of "one slow, four quick" was followed – slow recon and initial penetration, then fast approach, attack, clearance and withdrawal. A typical assault began with a detailed recon of the target- pinpointing bunkers, ammo dumps, command and communications centers, barracks, power generation facilities and other vital points. Data from many other sources (farmers, spies, informers etc.) was collected and added to this. Detailed mortar ranges to each target area were plotted. A mock-up of the target was created and detailed rehearsals took place. Assaults were usually planned after nightfall. Signalling systems were sometimes devised using colored flares. A typical signal package by the assault teams might be as follows: red flare: area hard to get into; white flare: withdrawal; green followed by white: reinforcements requested; green flare: victory.

Assault organization and formations. Depending on the size of the attack, sappers were usually divided into 10–20 man assault groups or teams, which were further subdivided into 3–5 man assault cells. Each was tasked with destroying or neutralizing a specific area of the enemy defense. Four echelons might be employed on a typical sapper operation. An Assault group took on the main burden of the initial penetration through the wire and other defenses. A Fire-support group might be used to lay down covering fire via RPGs, mortars or machine guns at key points such as when the penetration elements cleared the wire, or at a set time, or via a pre-arranged signal. A small Security group might be deployed to position themselves to ambush reinforcements that attempted to rush to the defense of the besieged area. A Reserve group might be held back to exploit success, mop up or extract their fellow soldiers if the situation began to deteriorate. Deployment of these elements depended on the target and available forces. In larger attacks, where the sappers were to lead the way, the fire support, exploitation or security roles might be undertaken by bigger echelons of regular follow-on forces which used breaches created by the sappers to conduct their operations.

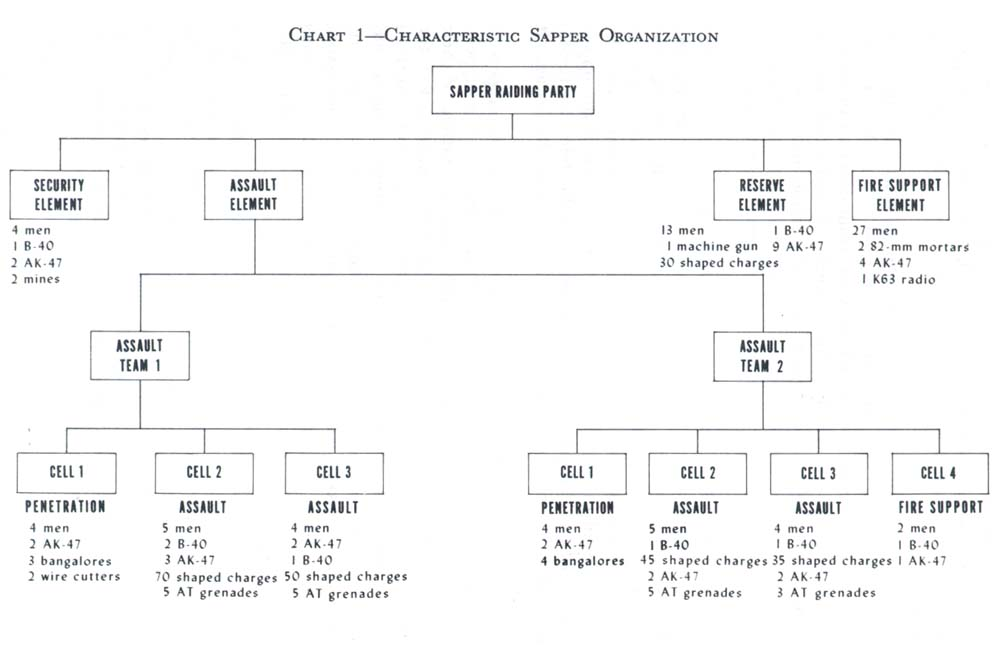
Sapper raiding formation

Initial assault movement. Movement to the target area was typically by long, roundabout routes to conceal the mission and fool enemy observation. Once they had reached the target, infiltrators in the advance units spread themselves around the perimeter according to their assigned tasks. Detailed prior reconnaissance helped in this effort. They strapped weapons and explosive charges to their bodies to minimize noise as they maneuvered through the outer band of fortifications, and often covered their bodies in charcoal and grease to aid movement and make detection more difficult. Barbed wire was sometimes only cut partially, with the remaining strands broken by hand to muffle the tell-tale "snip" of wire-cutters. Tripflares were neutralized by wrapping their triggers with cloth or strips of bamboo carried in the teeth of the vanguard fighters. Claymore mines might be turned in another direction.

A point man usually preceded each team – crawling silently through defenses, probing with his fingers to detect and neutralize obstacles, while the others followed behind. Sometimes gaps in the wire were created by tying down strands to make an assault corridor. Woven mats might be thrown over barbed wire to facilitate passage. Sappers often used Bangalore torpedoes made from blocks of TNT tied to bamboo poles to blast open assault routes. Attack routes often took unexpected avenues of approach, such as through the trash pits of US Firebase Cunningham in 1969.

The main attack and withdrawal. Based on the target and relevant military situation, some attacks proceeded mainly by stealth, with little initial covering fire until the last moment. Breaches might be created in the wire at several points, then left open while the penetration teams aligned with their objectives, and hunkered down, awaiting the hour of decision. Other strikes, particularly against heavily defended US targets used a barrage of covering fires to keep defenders penned in their positions, heads down, while the assault groups moved stealthily into position. Targets were usually hit in priority order- according to the level of danger they presented to the sapper units, or based on relevant military or political objectives. Emphasizing utmost ruthlessness in attack, the sub-doctrine of the "3 strongs" (surprise, concentration of force and exploitation of success) was generally followed.

If discovered, the sappers often sprang up and attacked immediately. Diversionary assaults and fires were also created to screen the main sapper effort. Once the fierce fighting of the main phase was over, the pullout began. While small rearguard type elements might be left in place for delaying or diversionary purposes, withdrawal was generally a quick affair. Valuable enemy weapons and other equipment were rounded up, and the bodies of the dead and wounded were removed. Detailed after-action reports and "self-criticism" exercises were conducted by VC/PAVN forces, absorbing lessons learned and sharpening their skills for the next assault.

==== Examples of sapper attacks ====
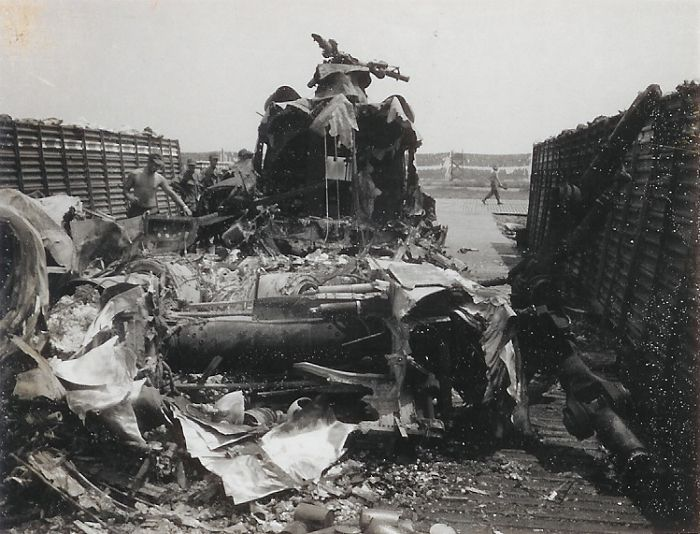
Sappers destroyed 9 heavy lift helicopters and damaged 3 at Cu Chi Base Camp, February 26, 1969. The base was built near terrain honeycombed with miles of NLF tunnels and hideouts and was harassed continually. Sappers staged from such tunnels and used satchel charges in the 1969 operation.

===== Sapper attack on 242nd Aviation Company – Củ Chi, 1969 =====
Attacks on the US 25th Infantry Division base at Củ Chi, in 1969, illustrate sapper operations that caused less destruction, but they were carried out nevertheless on one of the most important and well-defended US bases in Vietnam. This particular action involved an apparent mix of VC and NVA elements that destroyed nine Boeing CH-47 Chinook heavy lift helicopters, damaged three more and blew up an ammo dump. VC sappers by some reports led the assault, with NVA providing follow-on ground or fire-support attacks. However, by 1969, most Main Force VC formations were manned by northern soldiers, and communist forces continually used shifting unit numbers to confuse ARVN and US order of battle experts, so the VC-NVA distinction and unit designations are less than clear.

POW interrogations revealed close coordination with local guerrilla elements and informers, including provision of detailed drawings and sketches of the target area. Penetration teams achieved almost complete surprise, with the sappers cutting 10 barbed wire fences, and advancing without being detected by sentries, obstacles or patrols. A rocket attack was the signal for the sappers to go into action against the helicopters and soldiers. Aside from the aircraft, US troop losses were comparatively light (1 dead, 3 wounded versus some 30 NVA or VC dead), nevertheless the incident reveals the ability of the VC/NVA to stay in the field while they rebuilt after the losses of Tet.

===== Pochentong Airport Raid, 1971 =====
On the night of 21–22 January 1971, a hundred PAVN sappers passed undetected through the defensive perimeter of the Special Military Region (Région Militaire Speciale – RMS) set by the Khmer National Armed Forces around Phnom Penh and carried out a spectacular raid on Pochentong Air Base. Broken into six smaller detachments armed mostly with AK-47 assault rifles and RPG-7 anti-tank rocket launchers, the attackers scaled the barbed-wire fence and quickly overwhelmed the poorly armed airmen of the Security Battalion on duty that night. Once inside the facility, they unleashed a barrage of small-arms fire and RPGs against any aircraft they found on the parking area adjacent to the runway and nearby buildings; one of the commando teams even scaled the adjoining commercial terminal of the civilian airport and after taking position at the international restaurant located on the roof, they fired a rocket into the napalm depot near the Khmer Air Force (KAF) apron. When the smoke cleared the next morning, the KAF had been virtually annihilated. A total of 69 aircraft stationed at Pochentong at the time were either completely destroyed or severely damaged on the ground. Apart from the aircraft losses, 39 FANK officers and enlisted men had lost their lives and another 170 were injured. Pochentong was closed for almost a week while the damage was assessed, wreckage removed, the runway repaired and the stocks of fuel and ammunitions replenished.

===== Sapper attack on Firebase Mary Ann, 1971 =====
Weapons captured in the aftermath of sapper attack against US 46th Infantry at Firebase Mary-Ann, 1971

The attack against US Army Firebase Mary Ann in 1971 by the Main Force VC 409th Sapper Battalion, is another example of these techniques. Surprise was achieved on the objective – with many on the US side not believing the NVA would attack such a small outpost. The Firebase had seen little serious threat in the past, and was manned by 250 mostly American soldiers and some ARVN. In addition, earlier helicopter and aircraft operations at the base had touched off a number of warning flares in the wire surrounding the complex. These had not been replaced when the attack came. A mortar barrage was laid down at a set time to open the battle. This provided cover for the sappers, who were already pre-positioned far forward, to move quickly towards their objectives. They destroyed the Battalion Operations Center and a number of command posts, and created general mayhem before withdrawing when helicopter gunships arrived.

The final US toll was almost 30 dead and 82 wounded. Suspicion still lingers about this controversial attack, including charges that VC infiltrators posed as ARVN soldiers to facilitate the assault. If so, the incident demonstrates the long reach of the VC intelligence services, and their sophisticated planning and execution of the assault. Several senior American commanders were relieved of duty or were reprimanded after the event. Audaciously, the VC attacked the ruins of the firebase the following day with machine gun fire. One Vietnam War historian calls this incident the "U.S. Army's most blatant and humiliating defeat in Vietnam."

==== Raids on naval vessels ====
The VC also applied their tactics against naval vessels, where a handful of men would swim up against vessels, plant mines, then detonate them. This was seen in instances like the Attack on USNS Card and the USS Westchester County, the latter causing the United States Navy's greatest single-incident combat loss of life during the entire war with 25 sailors killed and another 27 wounded. Such attacks, mainly directed at shipping vessels, were highly effective, with 88 successful attacks between 1962 and 1969 killing 210 personnel and wounding another 325 in return for only 20 sappers killed or captured.

=== Final victory by conventional forces ===
==== Improvements in PAVN performance over the 1972 Offensive ====
Assessment of VC/NVA performance must look beyond the American interlude, and the guerrilla warfare phases to the final outcome of the Vietnam War in 1975. Well before the end, the Viet Cong were reduced to a minor force, and regular PAVN formations controlled the field. While final victory was aided by absence of American airpower, the PAVN/VPA armies were no longer the light-infantry formations mauled at the Battle of Ia Drang in 1965, but a tough, proficient, well-equipped modern force. Their capabilities had grown considerably, and several shortcomings of the conventional 1972 Easter Offensive were remedied.

In 1972 there was distinct weaknesses in the coordination of armor, artillery and infantry, with the three fronts of advance failing to support one another satisfactorily. Armored forces were often committed in penny packets, with lack of effective infantry support and artillery co-operation, making them vulnerable to US and ARVN countermeasures. The logistics system was also unable to support the tempo of full-scale conventional battle. By 1975, these weaknesses had been substantially corrected, and a sophisticated military machine attained a rapid victory. The Ho Chi Minh Trail was increasingly a network of paved roads easing the logistical flow for the Offensive and tactical concentration and coordination of infantry, armor and artillery was much tighter.

Integral to the PAVN advance was combined infantry and armor columns, that threw ARVN opponents off balance with swift moves and rapid concentrations. Extensive use was made of the "blooming lotus" tactic to assault cities and towns. Rather than surround them and work inward in the orthodox manner of many contemporary Western armies, PAVN mobile columns bypassed opposition on the target's perimeter, and drove inward to seize vital command and control nodes in the central areas first, before striking outward to liquidate opposition. A reserve force was held on standby to defeat counterattacks against the penetration force.

A leap-frogging tactic was also employed to maintain momentum. Spearhead units would sometimes deploy quickly to tackle opposition, while follow-on echelons bypassed such engagements to strike deeper. Infiltration units like sappers also assisted the push by seizing bridges, road junctions and other key points ahead of the main forces. Deception measures were also widely used, with diversionary operations across a broad area, and troop movements timed until the last minute, to avoid telegraphing the main points of attack. Such methods for example, enabled quick conquest of towns like Ban Me Thuot and their surrounding highways, and paved the way for further operations towards Saigon.

Terror and panic played their part in the NVA/PAVN advance, particularly in the Central Highlands where five rapidly moving divisions overwhelmed hapless ARVN formations. During the retreat from the Highlands, massive columns of civilian refugees mingled with fleeing South Vietnamese troops. PAVN forces shelled these columns indiscriminately with mortars, rockets and artillery, killing over 100,000 civilians by some estimates, and liquidating some 40,000 out of 60,000 retreating ARVN soldiers.

==== PAVN as a modern, professional army ====
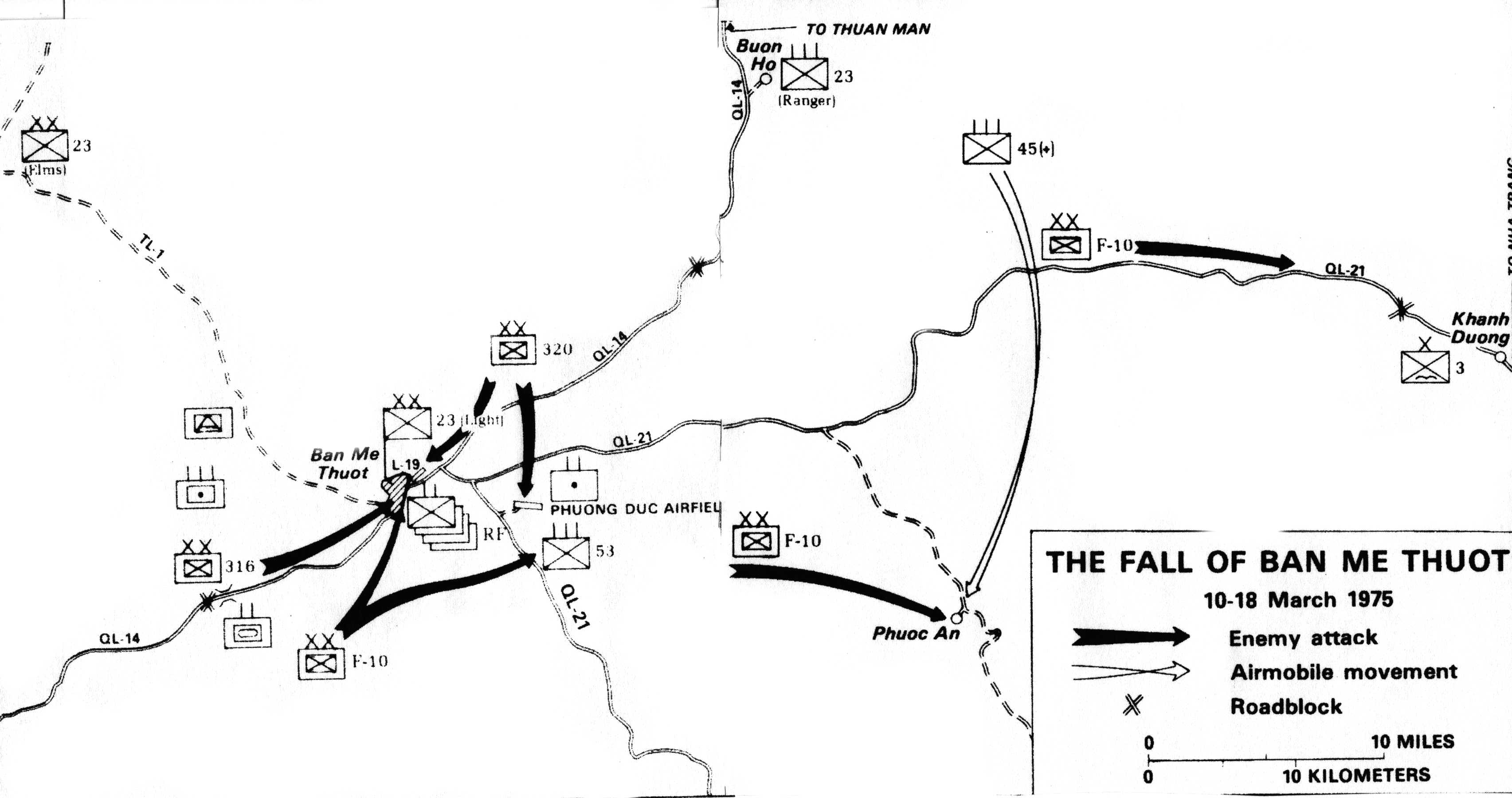
The fall of Ban Me Thuot

The final PAVN triumph was aided by numerous weaknesses and failures in South Vietnamese forces and leadership. Thieu's "hold everywhere" strategy in the months before the Northern offensive stretched ARVN forces too thinly and withered away any central reserve. Ongoing corruption and incompetence dogged and demoralized the ARVN rank and file. For example, rampant inflation wiped out the inadequate wages of troops that already had little medical care available. In a society where regular full-time soldiers and their dependents made up about 20% of the population, this amounted to widespread impoverishment of important segments of South Vietnamese society. Desertion rates after the American pullout approached 25% of total force strength, reductions that were not made up when the end came. Of the total 1,000,000 men theoretically mobilized for defence (including about half a million militia), only about 10% were direct combat troops. Disastrous leadership decisions in the final weeks of fighting such as the debacle in the highlands (see Ho Chi Minh Campaign) sealed the doom of a troubled force.

Such weaknesses were skillfully exploited by the fast-moving Northern conquest, in a final campaign that illustrates a coming of age for the PAVN forces in the minds of some Western historians.

Almost a quarter century ago, a third world country won the final battle of a long and difficult war through the use of an unexpected and decidedly modern strategy. The tutorial embodied in this victory is worth remembering today, in an age when there is a tendency to rely more on technology than on strategy and to assume that our enemy's strategic skills are as backward as his nation's economy, social structure and technological base... For the first time, PAVN's campaign strategy was not based primarily on the demonstrated willingness of its troops to die in greater numbers than those of its opponents. Moreover, it paid only lip service to the old dogma of a popular uprising. The PAVN campaign relied instead on deception, diversion, surprise, an indirect approach and alternate objectives – in short, a highly cerebral strategy. PAVN finally mounted a campaign worthy of the modern, professional army the Vietnamese communist leadership worked so long to build.

== Assessment of NLF/PAVN performance ==
=== Focus on American versus Vietnamese perspectives ===
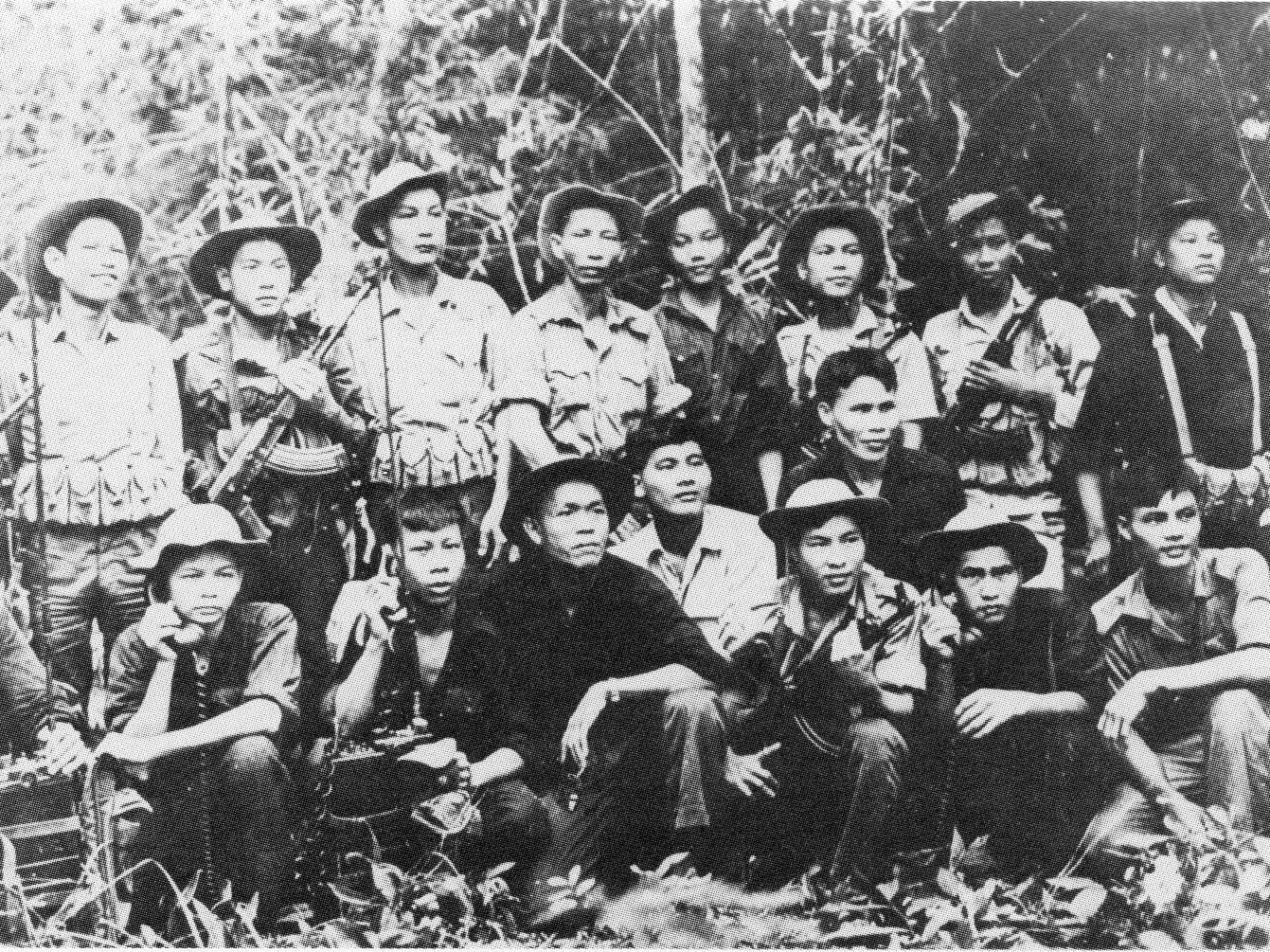
NLF Main Force troops

Numerous Western histories of the Vietnam War, some scholars argue tend to assign the Vietnamese a secondary role in terms of the developments that led to victory by the North. For example, while American combat deaths are often referenced in the large number of Western histories, comparatively little mention is made of the 275,000 combat deaths suffered by the South Vietnamese, almost 5 times the American total. Just the evacuation of Da Nang in March 1975 cost the South Vietnamese an estimated 60,000 deaths, more than total US military losses for the entire conflict.

There is often heavy concentration on the American effort and its mistakes, contradictions and strategy, but comparatively little on the Vietnamese side, save as it ties into the theme of American failure or missteps. Whatever the merits of these arguments about war coverage, it is clear that the main 8-year American interlude (albeit important) was only a relatively short one in the decades-old struggle for hegemony in the Second Indochina War.

=== VC/NVA battlefield performance ===
VC/NVA performance waxed and waned with the fortunes of war. Weapons and equipment at the small arms level were equal with those of their enemies, and in some categories of heavy artillery they also achieved parity. The struggle against US bombing saw deployment of one of the most sophisticated air defence systems in the world, albeit with Soviet assistance. In other categories they could not match the wide range of advanced US technology.

Against their ARVN opponents the VC/NVA generally did well in both guerrilla and conventional warfare, and were on the verge of victory in 1965, before the American intervention. While ARVN forces achieved a number of impressive successes, they were, on balance, clearly outclassed by the PAVN armies, which suffered from weaknesses in certain areas, such as airpower and the handling of armor- illustrated particularly in the 1972 Easter Offensive. Subsequent campaigns in Indochina however, illustrate a number of PAVN strengths – from the rapid victory of 1975, to the initial 1979 invasion of Cambodia which saw well coordinated corps-sized combined arms operations including an amphibious assault against the coast. PAVN strengths were also shown in its defensive operations during the 1979 Sino-Vietnamese War.

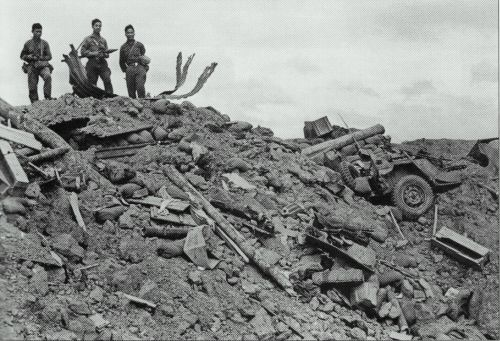
NVA troops survey a ruined ARVN bunker, 1971

Against US forces the record is more mixed. There were a number of successes particularly in ambushes, sapper attacks and various other engagements. When entrenched in strong positions, they were able to exact a price on attacking American troops, before withdrawing to cross-border sanctuaries to fight another day. VC/NVA operations however were sometimes marked by very heavy casualties. Typical of these were the Tet attacks and the border battles that saw heavy losses against superior US air, ground and naval firepower. American strategic mobility, using airpower and helicopters also took a heavy toll and blunted several communist initiatives, most notably at the Ia Drang, Tet and other places. In general during the war, US forces caused far more casualties to the VC/NVA than the other way around. However, the communist forces were usually able to replenish their forces. Expansion of the battle-space over a wide area, and attrition over time however, the linchpin of their protracted war strategy, kept their forces intact until this formidable opponent withdrew.

=== Elements in NLF/PAVN triumph ===
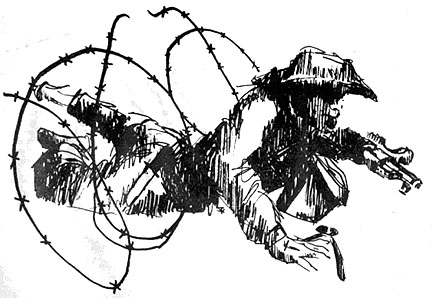
Main Force Viet Cong Sapper – 1970. After the devastating losses of Tet, sapper operations gained in importance as the VC/NVA rebuilt.

There are numerous keys to the final outcome of the Vietnam War. A few of these interrelated factors are summarized below:

1. A protracted, integrated strategy that maximized Northern strengths against the weaknesses of their Southern and American opponents. This was the strategy of protracted war, that tightly integrated political and military factors, and slowly weakened opposition over time by an attritional campaign. Protracted war also involved sequencing a mix of combat styles. This ranged from small-scale guerrilla attacks, to main-force battles that even when costly, atrophied enemy strength and morale. It also drew powerful US forces into peripheral areas, while allowing VC/NVA forces to control the key to any People's War, the population. All these measures were keyed to political ends, and included ruthless assassination, kidnapping and sabotage efforts throughout the war. To some US soldiers who fought against the VC/NVA, like US Lt. General Phillip Davidson, Chief of Military Intelligence from 1967 to 69, and US war historians like Andrew F. Krepinevich Jr. this strategy was a superior one in terms of Communist objectives and strengths, and American/GVN weaknesses.
2. Superior motivation and morale. Seen in terms of determination to achieve final victory in Indochina, Communist motivation and morale was superior to that of their enemies. For VC/NVA forces the conflict was not simply another costly Cold War episode but a life and death struggle spanning generations. Some northern leaders stressed the predominance of spiritual over material factors, a notion sometimes paid for with dire results and painful lessons under enemy (particularly American) firepower. Nevertheless, some scholars argue that over the course of almost two decades, both PAVN leadership and the ordinary PAVN soldier were more determined to achieve final triumph, and more willing to expend lives and treasure towards this end, than their opponents.
3. Detailed, overlapping organization backed by thorough going indoctrination. Historian Douglas Pike in 'Viet Cong' (1966) asserts that the closest thing to a "secret weapon" of the revolutionary forces was organization – tight, overlapping mechanisms of structure that enmeshed its subjects in a tight web of control. This structure included the parallel system of party control at all levels of civilian and military life, the overlapping plethora of organizations from province to village hamlet that enhanced resource exploitation, the three-man cells all troops were organized into, and the heavy use of "criticism and self-criticism" that pervaded all levels. One American Vietnam War historian calls the Viet Cong "more disciplined and organized than nearly any insurgents in history."
4. Logistical, military, political and diplomatic support by friendly communist nations. Aid from China and the Soviet Union was indispensable to the tough military machine on the ground, and the equally tenacious machine on the diplomatic and political fronts. This aid made North Vietnam dependent on their suppliers, but it was able to play one off against the other to enhance their bargaining power and maintain a stance of relative independence. Support by communist nations also included the threat of massive Chinese intervention if the US opted to eliminate the northern regime by a conventional invasion, or threatened China itself. This threat, or perceived threat, effectively stymied that option. Though China was reluctant to confront the US directly in another Korean War style morass, it conveyed deterrent threats to the United States not only through military aid and deployment of over 300,000 supporting PLA troops in North Vietnam, but on some occasions, signaled China's readiness for action through such indirect diplomatic channels as Pakistan and Britain. Some historians argue that the Chinese threat was overstated, and that Peking was more concerned with internal turmoil and the Soviet Union in the late 1960s, and was willing to tolerate US intervention "as long as that intervention did not include rolling back communism in North Vietnam." This implicit guarantee of the North's survival, backed by the ultimate menace of massive Chinese action, curtailed America's full freedom of action.
5. Logistical resilience and manoeuvring space. The enormous, and successful Communist logistics effort in the face of devastating enemy firepower provided another key to victory. Supplied by supportive socialist allies, distribution to the battle zone, utilizing the manoeuvring space that was the Ho Chi Minh and Sihanouk Trails was an impressive logistical feat. This vast space – encompassing parts of Laos, Cambodia as well as the two Vietnams, stymied American and South Vietnamese interdiction efforts. Thorough organization and lavish expending of manpower were the skeleton and muscle of this achievement, which centered primarily on the Ho Chi Minh Trail, or what the North called the Trường Sơn Strategic Supply Route. This was supported by the Shianouk Trail and a large network of waterways. In terms of the tremendous effort to achieve victory at any cost, one American war historian asserts: "By any standard of human endeavor and achievement, what happened on the Ho Chi Minh Trail must rank high among the works of men and women."
6. Massive manpower pool. The substantial manpower available to communist forces in the struggle was critical. Some of this was external, with China providing over 300,000 troops to maintain logistical support on roads, railways, supply instillations and military facilities such as anti-aircraft batteries, and cross-border sanctuary airbases. Within South Vietnam, Viet Cong forces around the time of the Tet Offensive are estimated by some Western analysts as around 300,000 main force fighters, local guerillas and cadre. Northern sources claim a combined total of 690,000 NVA and VC troops in place as early as 1966. The exact communist Order of Battle on the ground was a matter of controversy with competing and shifting estimates between American MACV and CIA analysts, but most agreed on the huge manpower pool available to the north - with approximately 175,000 males reaching draft-age annually, and a total of 4 million draft-age males available for the war. These resources were marshalled relentlessly to achieve total victory. Historian Douglas Pike notes that the relatively small, under-developed territory of North Vietnam fielded one of the largest armies in the world by war's end. Large manpower supplies also were important on the home front struggle against American airpower. One 1968 CIA intel estimate notes that manpower was not unlimited and local shortages occurred. Nevertheless, Hanoi not only had enough personnel to continue fighting on present levels but enough to keep escalating the conflict beyond, and that some 3% of the civilian population (475,000 - 600,000 people) had been mobilized to fill in craters, stockpile material, and repair infrastructure destroyed by US bombing.
7. Time and tempo. While they absorbed severe blows at times, the VC/NVA had time on their side under the strategy of protracted conflict. Communist forces suffered some one million dead according to their own estimates but this was relative in a conflict where manpower reserves were plentiful and key allies like China were providing tens of thousands of troops to keep border supply and transport routes open. Tempo manifested itself at the local level. Except for those times when they were forced into a battle by US sweeps, or during deployment for a major operation, Communist troops spent most of their time in area control and consolidation, not fighting. Overall, they controlled the initiative – when, where and with what intensity to strike. Tempo was also a factor in the long-term struggle. Communist forces were able to meter their losses as the conflict waxed and waned – depending on the political, diplomatic and military situation – scaling back after the setbacks of Tet, and increasing effort dramatically in 1972 and 1975, when the situation looked more favorable.
8. Shrewd performance on the political and diplomatic fronts. Communist forces waged a number of effective propaganda and diplomatic campaigns to exploit contradictions in the camps of their enemies. One key triumph of politics (albeit backed by force of arms) was the continued use of sanctuaries in supposedly "neutral" countries, the cultivation of indigenous "liberation forces" like the Pathet Lao, and the inability of their opponents to make significant inroads against these indispensable rear bases. Other triumphs included the division of American opinion (epitomized in visiting American celebrities and media reports), the isolation of the Southern regime from their American backers, the "talk-fight" stonewalling strategy to extract maximum concessions, and perceptive calculation of the limits US leaders would observe in deploying military force. Considerations of political performance must include the efficacy of dau tranh strategy in the creation and manipulation of numerous "front" or shell groups within South Vietnam to isolate its ruling regime, mobilize grassroots support for revolutionary aims, and encourage evasion and defection among its armed forces.
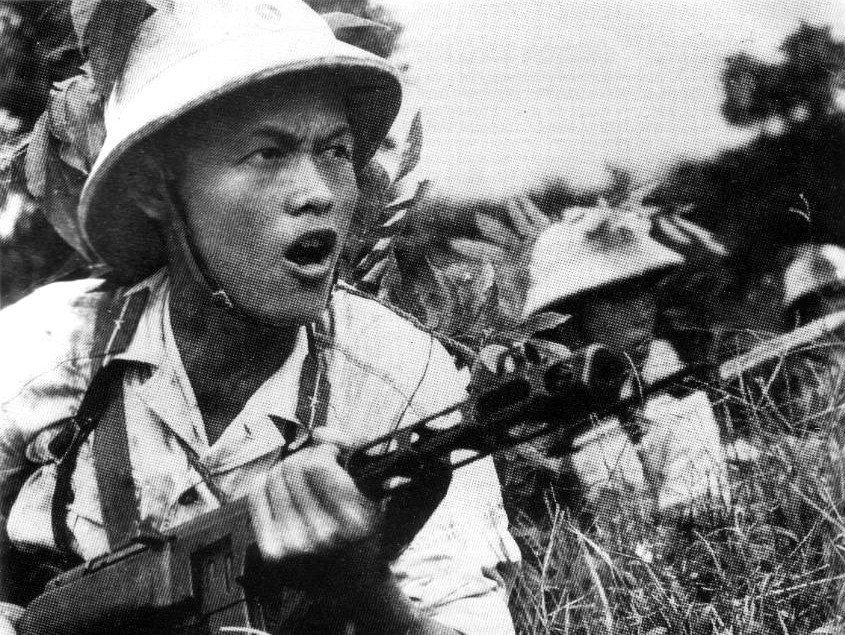
  The PAVN/NLF military effort was generally much more determined and organized than that of the ARVN.
9. The ruthless determination of leaders of the revolutionary struggle. This includes both northerners and a heavy southern presence in the North's ruling echelons. By the time of the final victory in 1975, many of these leaders had been on the field of struggle for two decades. There was often division within this leadership. More conservative "north-firsters" clashed with "south-firsters" but ultimately, their collective determination prevailed.
10. Failure of the South Vietnamese leadership to develop an effective political narrative and administration. Some of this failure grew out of the difficult conditions in which South Vietnam was initially established. This initial weakness was also reflected in political instability, endemic corruption, and inefficient administration. Despite these vulnerabilities however, it is also clear that millions of South Vietnamese opposed the takeover of their society by a communist dictatorship and fought resolutely against this outcome. The southern regime however, could not develop a convincing political narrative and the degree of thorough political organization and mobilization to meet it, compared to their opponents. The American failure was marked by its own set of shortcomings and miscalculations, but was inextricably linked to South Vietnamese difficulties, some historians maintain. Given a merciless civil war, ultimate settlement of the conflict was between the Vietnamese.
11. Corruption, incompetence and ineffective politicization of South Vietnamese military leadership. Southern ineffectiveness was reflected in the appointment of military leaders based on loyalty or family ties rather than professional competence, the ineffectual intertwining of officers in both military and civilian affairs, and widespread nepotism, corruption and factionalism that focused on personal agendas and profit rather than winning the war at hand. The best ARVN units such as the Rangers, Marines, paratroops and special forces were too often unavailable for battle because they were held back by Saigon's leaders for internal political maneuvering. The people least likely to see promotion were often the front-line battlefield commanders, continually passed over in favor of political cronies or those paying bribes. In 1968 for example less than 2 percent of all officers promoted to higher rank held their new positions based on battlefield competence. PAVN/NLF military leadership was likewise heavily politicized, but in the communist case, effective management and accountable personnel were in place to fight the war to a victorious conclusion. ARVN effectiveness in combat was mixed, and often marred by incompetent higher leadership, such as the performance of General Hoang Xuan Lam (later relieved of command) during the 1971 Laos incursion). Lower level leaders in general made a better showing, but too often lacked initiative, determination and skill under battle conditions. There were exceptions at all levels, such as Lt. General Ngo Quang Truong, and some lower level officers but the general pattern above fared badly against the more dedicated and efficient NVA/NLF. Even such key fundamentals as mobilizing available troop strength or furnishing supplies to the front line were mired in malfeasance. Quartermaster units for example sometimes demanded bribes before furnishing fighting men with rice, ammunition, gasoline, and other material. As much as 10 percent of the regular armed forces were non-existent "ghost" soldiers (deserters, disabled, deceased etc) who still appeared on the official rosters with leaders pocketing the extra payroll of the bogus troops. Such weaknesses were untenable in the face of a ruthlessly determined northern enemy. The US military's Vietnamization program exacerbated the problem, with massive theft and waste taking place. An American GAO audit for example found some $200 million worth of items had vanished, including $10 million in small arms, and 143 small warships. ARVN troops continued their profligate practices, even with US largesse decreasing, at times expending as much as 56 tons of ammunition for every 1 used by PAVN forces.
12. The mobilizing force of Marxism-Leninism, mated to Vietnamese nationalism. While in some ways Marxism was alien to the Vietnamese landscape, revolutionary leaders succeeded in blending it with traditional Vietnamese xenophobia and a growing modern sense of nationalism. Marxism also presented a sense of inevitable historical progress that enhanced mobilization, and included the key role of the Lao Dong, the Communist Party of North Vietnam. These factors helped mobilise some support within South Vietnam.
13. Ability to learn and adapt. Against both the US and ARVN the VC/NVA demonstrated an ability to adapt on the battlefield. They learned from their mistakes and adopted tactics and measures to reduce losses. These ranged from deep tunnel systems, "hugging" techniques in infantry battles, widespread random mining, fast-moving sapper assaults, treetop fighting positions to foil US helicopters, deployment of new Soviet supplied technology like man-portable missiles, to simple avoidance of battle without overwhelming numerical superiority. The keen study of their own strengths and weaknesses through "criticism and self-criticism," and the systematic distribution of "lessons learned" through reports and memorandum was part of this crucial learning ability, demonstrating that the NLF/PAVN were not hapless peasants, but a well equipped, serious and sophisticated military organization.

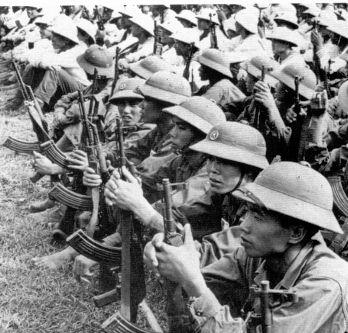
PAVN troops. By the end of the conflict, they were a tough, proficient modern force, well equipped to carry out conventional operations.

== See also ==
- NLF and PAVN strategy, organization and structure
- NLF and PAVN logistics and equipment
- Strategy and tactics of guerrilla warfare
- Weapons of the Vietnam War
- History of Vietnam
- Military Assistance Command, Vietnam Studies and Observations Group
- The United States and the Vietnam War

== Sources ==
- RAND Corp (August 1967), Insurgent Organization and Operations: A Case Study of the Viet Cong in the Delta, 1964–1966, Santa Monica
- Lanning, Michael Lee; Cragg, Dan (1993), Inside the VC and the NVA, Ballantine Books
