= Chambers v. Mississippi =

- Supreme Court of the United States

Argued November 15, 1972 Decided February 21, 1973
- Full case name: Leon Chambers v. State of Mississippi
- Docket no.: 71-5908
- Citations: 410 U.S. 284 (more) 93 S. Ct. 1038. 35 L. Ed. 2d 297
- Argument: Oral argument

Case history
- Prior: Chambers v. State, 252 So. 2d 217 (Miss. 1971) (per curiam); bail granted, 405 U.S. 1205 (1972); cert. granted, 405 U.S. 987 (1972).

Holding
- A state may not enforce its rules of evidence in a criminal trial so as to disallow the defendant the right to present reliable exculpatory evidence and thereby deny the defendant a fair trial.

Court membership
- Chief Justice Warren E. Burger Associate Justices William O. Douglas · William J. Brennan Jr. Potter Stewart · Byron White; Thurgood Marshall · Harry Blackmun; Lewis F. Powell Jr. · William Rehnquist

Case opinions
- Majority: Powell, joined by Burger, Douglas, Brennan, Stewart, Marshall, Blackmun
- Concurrence: White
- Dissent: Rehnquist

Laws applied
- Fourteenth Amendment to the United States Constitution

Chambers v. Mississippi, 410 U.S. 284 (1973), was a United States Supreme Court case in which the Court held that a state may not enforce its rules of evidence, such as rules excluding hearsay, in a fashion that disallows a criminal defendant from presenting reliable exculpatory evidence and thus denies the defendant a fair trial.

== Background ==
Leon Chambers, of Woodville, Mississippi, was charged by the State of Mississippi with murdering Police Officer Aaron Liberty by shooting him. Chambers pleaded not guilty and insisted throughout the proceedings that he was not the shooter. Prior to the trial, another Woodville man, Gable McDonald, told at least three people that he, not Chambers, had shot Liberty and gave a sworn confession. However, at a preliminary hearing in the case, McDonald disavowed his confession.

At Chambers' jury trial, the defense called McDonald as a witness and put his confession into evidence. On cross-examination, the prosecution presented evidence that McDonald had withdrawn and disavowed the confession. The defense then asked for permission to examine McDonald as an adverse witness. The court denied permission, basing its ruling upon Mississippi's common-law "voucher" rule, which prohibits the party that called a witness to the stand from impeaching his own witness.

The defense then sought to present testimony from three other witnesses, all of whom would have testified that McDonald told them soon after the shooting that he and not Chambers had shot Officer Liberty. The trial judge found that this testimony would constitute inadmissible hearsay and excluded it.

The jury found Chambers guilty of murder and sentenced him to life imprisonment. The Supreme Court of Mississippi affirmed the conviction with one Justice dissenting.

Chambers then asked the United States Supreme Court to review his claim that the trial court's evidentiary rulings deprived him of a fair trial, in violation of the Fourteenth Amendment to the United States Constitution. While Chambers' petition for certiorari was pending, Circuit Justice Lewis F. Powell, Jr. released Chambers on bail. The Court granted certiorari.

== Opinion of the Court ==
In an opinion written by Justice Powell for an eight-Justice majority, the Court agreed that Chambers had been unconstitutionally deprived of a fair trial. The Court began its analysis by observing that "[t]he right of an accused in a criminal trial to due process is, in essence, the right to a fair opportunity to defend against the State's accusations. The rights to confront and cross-examine witnesses and to call witnesses on one's own behalf have long been recognized as essential to due process."

Here, because of the trial court's ruling on the defense's adverse-witness motion, "Chambers was denied an opportunity to subject McDonald's damning repudiation and alibi to cross-examination." The court observed that "[t]he right of cross examination ... is implicit in the constitutional right of confrontation, and helps assure the 'accuracy of the truth-determining process.'" Chambers had a constitutional right to conduct a full examination of McDonald without being bound by McDonald's testimony or barred from seeking to impeach it.

Chambers' rights were further violated by the trial judge's refusal to permit testimony from the three other witnesses, who would have testified that McDonald made statements shortly after the crime identifying himself as the shooter. Mississippi sought to defend this exclusion as a straightforward application of the hearsay rule, under which "[o]ut-of-court statements are traditionally excluded because they lack the conventional indicia of reliability," such as being made under oath and subject to cross-examination. However, the Court observed, the hearsay rule has developed many exceptions that allow the admission of hearsay statements "made under circumstances that tend to assure reliability." Here, "[t]he hearsay statements involved in this case were originally made and subsequently offered at trial under circumstances that provided considerable assurance of their reliability."

The Court "conclude[d] that the exclusion of this critical evidence, coupled with the State's refusal to permit Chambers to cross-examine McDonald, denied him a trial in accord with traditional and fundamental standards of due process." Accordingly, Chambers' conviction was reversed.

== Concurring opinion ==
Justice Byron R. White authored a concurring opinion discussing whether Chambers had sufficiently raised his constitutional objections to the trial court's rulings during the trial, so as to preserve them for appellate review. White expressed some skepticism on this point. However, White acknowledged that Chambers had raised his objections at trial, albeit on non-constitutional grounds, and that he had raised his due-process claim in the Mississippi Supreme Court. Moreover, the State did not argue non-preservation in opposing Chambers' petition. Therefore, White acquiesced dubitante in the majority's conclusion that the Court had jurisdiction to reach the merits. On the merits, he agreed with the majority opinion.

== Dissenting opinion ==
Justice William H. Rehnquist dissented. In his view, the Supreme Court lacked jurisdiction over Chambers' constitutional claims because he had not raised them at trial. Rehnquist also expressed his skepticism about what he characterized as "the Court's further constitutionalization of the intricacies of the common law of evidence."

== Social background to the case ==
The shooting of Officer Liberty took place during a period of racial unrest in Woodville, during which African-American residents were boycotting white-owned establishments to press demands for desegregation and increased services to black neighborhoods. During the boycotts, there had been a series of confrontations between members of the Deacons for Defense and the Woodville police force. The boycotters' demands had included the hiring of African-American police officers, and these demands had been granted to the extent of hiring a small number of black officers, whose superiors restricted them to acting against other blacks; Officer Liberty was himself African-American, and defendant Chambers had been the first black police officer in Woodville before being fired when he would not accept the limitations on his duties. None of this racial background and social history is mentioned anywhere in the Supreme Court opinions in the case.
