= Coleman v. Alabama =

- Supreme Court of the United States

Decided June 22, 1970
- Full case name: Coleman v. Alabama
- Citations: 399 U.S. 1 (more)

Holding
- A probable-cause hearing where a court decides whether there is sufficient evidence to present to a grand jury has a Sixth Amendment right-to-counsel requiring the appointment of a lawyer for the defendant.

Court membership
- Chief Justice Warren E. Burger Associate Justices Hugo Black · William O. Douglas; John M. Harlan II · William J. Brennan Jr. Potter Stewart · Byron White; Thurgood Marshall · Harry Blackmun

Case opinions
- Majority: Brennan (Part III), joined by Douglas, White, Marshall, Black
- Plurality: Brennan (all but Part III), joined by Douglas, White, Marshall
- Concurrence: Black
- Concur/dissent: Harlan
- Dissent: Burger
- Dissent: Stewart, joined by Burger
- Blackmun took no part in the consideration or decision of the case.

Coleman v. Alabama, 399 U.S. 1 (1970), was a criminal procedure case decided by the United States Supreme Court in 1970, in which the Court held that a probable-cause hearing where a court decides whether there is sufficient evidence to present to a grand jury has a Sixth Amendment right-to-counsel requiring the appointment of a lawyer for the defendant.

== Background ==
The petitioners in this case were accused of assault with intent to murder, and the prosecution used a witness identification as evidence. The victim testified that, "in the car lights," while "looking straight at him," he saw the petitioner who shot him, and saw the other petitioner "face to face." The victim also stated that he identified the gunman at the station house before the formal lineup began, and identified the other before he spoke the words used by the assailants. The petitioners conceded that United States v. Wade and Gilbert v. California were not retroactive, so the mere fact that the witness saw them before the lineup could not be used to exclude the identification. Instead, they challenged the evidence on the grounds that the court did not provide the petitioners with a lawyer during the hearing when the court considered admitting the witness identification as evidence.

== Supreme Court ==
The Supreme Court agreed that this was a violation of the Sixth Amendment, but the decision was split. Brennan's lead opinion for the case had plurality portions. First, his plurality of four justices rejected the objection to the lineup. Next, his plurality held that the preliminary hearing was a critical stage. Finally, speaking for a majority of the court with the addition of Justice Black, Brennan announced that the Sixth Amendment had been violated when the trial court held the preliminary hearing without providing the defendant with a lawyer. That majority observed that the record in the case did not reveal whether this denial of counsel was otherwise prejudicial to the defendant and remanded to the state court for another hearing to determine if harmless error analysis would require the courts to provide Coleman with any kind of relief.

Black wrote separately to explain that he did not believe the hearing was a critical stage, but he agreed that the Constitution requires courts to provide lawyers in these hearings nonetheless. He read the Sixth Amendment as containing a right to counsel "[i]n all criminal prosecutions" and observed that the preliminary hearing was part of a criminal prosecution; thus, the defendant needed to be given a lawyer.

Justice Harlan also wrote separately to agree that Coleman's right had been violated by the denial of counsel in the preliminary hearing. According to Harlan, if he was deciding the case on a clean slate, he would have held that there was no violation. However, Harlan thought that the expansions of the right to counsel in recent cases such as Miranda v. Arizona, which he dissented from, required the court to find a right to counsel violation here. Harlan also disagreed with the way the plurality had disposed of the lineup issue.

Justices Burger and Stewart wrote dissents.

Justice Blackmun took no part in the consideration or decision of the case.

== Later developments ==
In Adams v. Illinois, the Supreme Court held that the rule announced in Coleman was not retroactive.

Alabama is not the only state with preliminary hearings of this sort, and not all local court systems consider a preliminary hearing to be a critical stage. For example, the Washington Supreme Court developed a test for whether a hearing is a critical stage and determined that that state's preliminary hearing did not necessarily pass it. Nonetheless, in State v. Heng (2023), the Washington Supreme Court said that the hearing did not need to be a critical stage in order to trigger the right to counsel. In Washington, all criminal hearings have a right to counsel.
