= Stanley v. Illinois =

- Supreme Court of the United States

Argued October 19, 1971 Decided April 3, 1972
- Full case name: Stanley v. Illinois
- Citations: 405 U.S. 645 (more) 92 S. Ct. 1208; 31 L. Ed. 2d 551

Holding
- The State cannot, consistently with due process requirements, merely presume that unmarried fathers in general, and petitioner, in particular, are unsuitable and neglectful parents. Parental unfitness must be established on the basis of individualized proof.

Court membership
- Chief Justice Warren E. Burger Associate Justices William O. Douglas · William J. Brennan Jr. Potter Stewart · Byron White; Thurgood Marshall · Harry Blackmun; Lewis F. Powell Jr. · William Rehnquist

Case opinions
- Majority: White, joined by Brennan, Stewart, Marshall; Douglas (parts I, II)
- Dissent: Burger, joined by Blackmun
- Powell and Rehnquist took no part in the consideration or decision of the case.

Stanley v. Illinois, 405 U.S. 645 (1972), was a landmark United States Supreme Court case in which the Court held that the fathers of children born out of wedlock had a fundamental right to their children. The US Supreme Court found that, as a matter of due process, unwed fathers ought to be guaranteed the same rights as married or divorced fathers, who have a right to a hearing. The Court also held that Illinois' denial of unwed fathers a hearing, while extending that right to all other parents, violated the equal protection of the laws. Until the ruling, when the mother of a child born out of wedlock was unable to care for the child, through death or other circumstances, the child was made a ward of the state and either placed in an orphanage or foster care or for adoption.

== Background ==
Joan and Peter Stanley had lived together off and on for 18 years; they had three children together. When Joan Stanley died, the state held a dependency proceeding, declared the three minor children to be wards of the state, and placed them with court appointed guardians. Peter Stanley appealed the decision, as the state had never provided him a hearing to determine whether he was a fit parent, which would have occurred for a married father under similar circumstances. Mr. Stanley claimed that his lack of hearing violated his Fourteenth Amendment rights of equal protection and due process.

The case made it to the Illinois Supreme Court, which ruled that while there had been no determination of his fitness as a parent, the state was nonetheless justified in depriving him of parental rights based on the sole fact that he had not been married to the mother. Whether or not Mr. Stanley was a fit parent was irrelevant. In filings with the US Supreme Court, the State of Illinois argued that all unwed fathers are unfit parents, making it unnecessary to provide each unwed father a hearing.

== Decision ==
The US Supreme Court found in favor of Mr. Stanley by arguing that as a matter of due process, unwed fathers are guaranteed the same rights as married or divorced fathers. The state assumes custody of children involving other categories of parents only after a hearing is held to determine their parental fitness, and it requires proof of negligence to deem them unable to provide primary care. Thus, the same process must be applied for children born to parents outside of wedlock.

The Court also held that Illinois' denial of unwed fathers a hearing and extending it to all other parents (wed fathers, both wed and unwed mothers) violated the equal protection of the laws guaranteed by the Fourteenth Amendment.

=== Dissent ===
In a dissenting opinion, Chief Justice Burger and Justice Blackmun held that states had the right to draw an arbitrary distinction between wed and unwed fathers to protect the welfare of the child. They argued that Mr. Stanley had 18 years to assume the burden.

They also argued, "I believe that a State is fully justified in concluding, on the basis of common human experience, that the biological role of the mother in carrying and nursing an infant creates stronger bonds between her and the child than the bonds resulting from the male's often casual encounter."

He essentially argued in favor of the tender years doctrine, which had already begun being eliminated from state statutes that determined custody after divorce.

== Aftermath ==
The case was an important step for the rights of fathers and children. Until then, most states held a similar position to Illinois: unwed fathers were de facto unfit to care for their children, and their children should instead be made wards of the state.

Perhaps the most important implication of the case was for custody law regarding divorce, as most states had held to the tender years doctrine, which held that mothers were better suited biologically as primary caregivers than were fathers. The few states who had yet to change the laws were in effect put on notice that if the Supreme Court was supporting equal protection for unwed fathers, it would do so for divorcing fathers as well.
