= Parisi v. Davidson =

- Supreme Court of the United States

Argued October 19–20, 1971 Decided February 23, 1972
- Full case name: Joseph Parisi v. Phillip B. Davidson, et al.
- Citations: 405 U.S. 34 (more) 92 S. Ct. 815; 31 L. Ed. 2d 17; 1972 U.S. LEXIS 90

Case history
- Prior: 396 U.S. 1233; Certiorari to the United States Court of Appeals for the Ninth Circuit

Holding
- The District Court should not have stayed its hand in this case.

Court membership
- Chief Justice Warren E. Burger Associate Justices William O. Douglas · William J. Brennan Jr. Potter Stewart · Byron White; Thurgood Marshall · Harry Blackmun; Lewis F. Powell Jr. · William Rehnquist

Case opinions
- Majority: Stewart, joined by Burger, Brennan, White, Marshall, Blackmun
- Concurrence: Douglas
- Powell and Rehnquist took no part in the consideration or decision of the case.

Parisi v. Davidson, 405 U.S. 34 (1972), was a United States Supreme Court case resulting in the grant of habeas corpus relief to a soldier, Joseph Parisi, seeking an honorable discharge as a conscientious objector. The case was argued on October 19 and 20, 1971, and decided on February 23, 1972. The respondent was then Major General Phillip B. Davidson.

Parisi had brought a petition to Federal District Court that the Army's refusal to discharge him constituted habeas corpus – that in effect he was being unlawfully imprisoned. As a result, court-martial charges were brought against him by the Army. The Federal District Court and Court of Appeals concluded that consideration of his petition should be deferred pending the result of the court-martial. The Supreme Court decision overturned this, freeing the District Court to consider his petition.
