= List of United States Supreme Court cases, volume 405 =

This is a list of all the United States Supreme Court cases from volume 405 of the United States Reports:

Case name	Citation	Date decided
Boyd v. Dutton	405 U.S. 1	1972
Colombo v. New York	405 U.S. 9	1972
Roudebush v. Hartke	405 U.S. 15	1972
Parisi v. Davidson	405 U.S. 34	1972
Lindsey v. Normet	405 U.S. 56	1972
United States v. Generes	405 U.S. 93	1972
NLRB v. Scrivener	405 U.S. 117	1972
Duncan v. Tennessee	405 U.S. 127	1972
Bullock v. Carter	405 U.S. 134	1972
Giglio v. United States	405 U.S. 150	1972
Papachristou v. Jacksonville	405 U.S. 156	1972
Smith v. Florida	405 U.S. 172	1972
D.H. Overmyer Co. v. Frick Co.	405 U.S. 174	1972
Swarb v. Lennox	405 U.S. 191	1972
Richardson v. Wright	405 U.S. 208	1972
Iowa Beef Packers, Inc. v. Thompson	405 U.S. 228	1972
FTC v. Sperry & Hutchinson Co.	405 U.S. 233	1972
Hawaii v. Standard Oil Co.	405 U.S. 251	1972
Adams v. Illinois	405 U.S. 278	1972
United States v. Miss. Chem. Corp.	405 U.S. 298	1972
Rabe v. Washington	405 U.S. 313	1972
Willis v. Prudential Ins. Co.	405 U.S. 318	1972
Cruz v. Beto	405 U.S. 319	1972
Dunn v. Blumstein	405 U.S. 330	1972
Fein v. Selective Serv. System	405 U.S. 365	1972
Comm'r v. First Security Bank	405 U.S. 394	1972
Schneble v. Florida	405 U.S. 427	1972
Eisenstadt v. Baird	405 U.S. 438	1972
Loper v. Beto	405 U.S. 473	1972
Humphrey v. Cady	405 U.S. 504	1972
Gooding v. Wilson	405 U.S. 518	1972
Lynch v. Household Fin. Corp.	405 U.S. 538	1972
Ford Motor Co. v. United States	405 U.S. 562	1972
United States v. Topco Associates, Inc.	405 U.S. 596	1972
Alexander v. Louisiana	405 U.S. 625	1972
Stanley v. Illinois	405 U.S. 645	1972
Carter v. Stanton	405 U.S. 669	1972
Cole v. Richardson	405 U.S. 676	1972
Grubbs v. Gene. Elec. Credit Corp.	405 U.S. 699	1972
Evansville-Vanderburgh Airport Auth. Dist. v. Delta Air Lines, Inc.	405 U.S. 707	1972
Sierra Club v. Morton	405 U.S. 727	1972
Graves v. Barnes	405 U.S. 1201	1972
Chambers v. Mississippi	405 U.S. 1205	1972
