= Adams v. Illinois =

- Supreme Court of the United States

Argued December 7, 1971 Decided March 6, 1972
- Full case name: John Adam v. Illinois
- Citations: 405 U.S. 278 (more)

Case history
- Prior: 46 Ill. 2d 200, 263 N.E.2d 490 (1970)

Holding
- The right to counsel in preliminary hearings established by Coleman v. Alabama does not apply retroactively.

Court membership
- Chief Justice Warren E. Burger Associate Justices William O. Douglas · William J. Brennan Jr. Potter Stewart · Byron White; Thurgood Marshall · Harry Blackmun; Lewis F. Powell Jr. · William Rehnquist

Case opinions
- Majority: Brennan, joined by Stewart, White, Burger, Blackmun
- Concurrence: Burger
- Concurrence: Blackmun
- Dissent: Douglas, joined by Marshall
- Powell, Rehnquist took no part in the consideration or decision of the case.

Adams v. Illinois, 405 U.S. 278 (1972) was a United States Supreme Court case in which the Court held that the right to counsel in preliminary hearings announced by Coleman v. Alabama does not have a retroactive application. The retroactivity of criminal procedure decisions was controversial among members of the court at the time, but the Court announced a more concrete rule in Teague v. Lane.

== Historical Context ==
On February 10, 1967, the Circuit Court of Cook County in Illinois conducted a preliminary hearing for one John Adams, for the crime of selling heroin to one Albert Bradley. Adams was not afforded any counsel by the court for that hearing, and subsequently filed a motion to dismiss the charges based upon that fact, which was denied. The court denied his motion based upon People v. Morris, 30 Ill. 2d 406, 197 N.E.2d 433 (1964), which held,

"A preliminary hearing in Illinois is not a "critical stage" where rights or defenses must be raised or lost...[t]hese things being so, we see no basis for saying that the right to counsel arises upon preliminary hearing, or that fundamental fairness requires it."

Adams was subsequently convicted in a bench trial and sentenced to 10–13 years in prison, he then appealed his conviction to the Supreme Court of Illinois.

=== Supreme Court of Illinois ===
The Supreme Court of Illinois took up Adams' case, and handed down its decision on September 29, 1970 in an opinion written by Justice Daniel P. Ward. The court affirmed Adams' conviction. Adams' appeal rested on three grounds, the two biggest reasons being that his indictment listed "Al Nichols" as the purchaser when in reality the person was named Albert Bradley, which he claimed, "deprived him of his constitutional right to be informed of the nature of the accusation against him", and that he was not given counsel during the preliminary hearing.

The court rejected the first of these arguments, stating on his first challenge, "[w]e consider that it is not necessary that an indictment for the sale of a narcotic drug name the purchaser...[t]he statute creating the offense makes no reference to the purchaser of the drug and his identity is not an element of the crime." On the second argument, the court agreed with Adams in that, after the Supreme Court's decision in Coleman v. Alabama, the preliminary hearing is a "critical stage" in a criminal prosecution. It did not agree, however, with Adams' assertion that Coleman applies retroactively. The third claim was that the evidence did not support conviction, which the court rejected entirely.

After this decision, Adams appealed to the Supreme Court.

== Supreme Court Decision ==
The Supreme Court granted certiorari, and held oral arguments on December 7, 1971, and released its opinion on March 6, 1972. Justice William Brennan delivered the majority opinion, with Justice Lewis Powell delivering a dissenting opinion. The court ultimately held that Coleman should not retroactively apply to preliminary hearings conducted before it went into effect. The court reasoned,

"[w]e have given complete retroactive effect to the new rule, regardless of good faith reliance by law enforcement authorities or the degree of impact on the administration of justice, where the 'major purpose of new constitutional doctrine is to overcome an aspect of the criminal trial that substantially impairs its truthfinding function and so raises serious questions about the accuracy of guilty verdicts in past trials. . . .'"

It held that the fundamental differences in being afforded counsel at a preliminary hearing, during a lineup, and during trial all impact the "fact finding" process in a criminal trial differently, and thus are subject to differing levels of importance for their retroactivity. It weighed the possible probabilities of counsel at the fairly early preliminary hearing stage, and ultimately agreed with the Supreme Court of Illinois. It also put forth an argument that law enforcement should not be "faulted for not anticipating Coleman", and Coleman retroactive application would "seriously disrupt the administration of our criminal laws" in citing Johnson v. New Jersey, 384 U.S 719 (1966).
