= Dubitante =

Dubitante (Latin: "doubting") is used in law reports of a judge who is doubtful about a legal proposition but hesitates to declare it wrong. E.g., "Justice X acquiesces in the Court's opinion and judgment dubitante on the question of Constitutional preemption."

Some judges use this term after their names in separate opinions, as if analogous to concurring or dissenting. Doing so may signal that the judge has doubts about the soundness of the majority opinion, but not so grave as to merit dissent. The legal philosopher Lon L. Fuller said that "the opinion entered dubitante [means that] the judge is unhappy about some aspect of the decision rendered, but cannot quite bring himself to record an open dissent."

Another use—doubt but lack of conviction that the majority is wrong—is illustrated in Judge Friendly's concurrence in Feldman v. Allegheny Airlines, Inc., in which he stated, "Although intuition tells me that the Supreme Court of Connecticut would not sustain the award made here, I cannot prove it. I therefore go along with the majority, although with the gravest doubts."

In 2005, Westlaw recorded 626 uses of the term in the United States. Nearly half of the instances of use of the term come from four federal court of appeals judges: Frank Coffin (First Circuit); Henry J. Friendly (Second Circuit); Frank Easterbrook (Seventh Circuit); and James C. Hill (Eleventh Circuit).

== Examples ==
- Majors v. Abell, 361 F.3d 349, 358 (7th Cir. 2004) (Easterbrook, J., dubitante). In Majors, Judge Easterbrook wrote a dubitante opinion, arguing that Judge Posner's opinion ignored four controlling cases from the Supreme Court protecting anonymous speech. He added:
  Given McConnell, I cannot be confident that my colleagues are wrong in thinking that five Justices will go along. But I also do not understand how that position can be reconciled with established principles of constitutional law.
  Judge Easterbrook is one of the most frequent users of dubitante among those few judges who use the term.
- Loughrin v. United States, 573 U.S. 351, 367, 134 S.Ct. 2384, 2395 (2014) (Scalia, J., concurring in part and concurring in the judgment). United States Supreme Court Justice Antonin Scalia wrote in his concurring opinion: "But I am dubitante on the point that one obtains bank property 'by means of' a fraudulent statement only if that statement is 'the mechanism naturally inducing a bank (or custodian of bank property) to part with money in its control' ... What the proper solution may be should in my view be left for another day."
- Lesley v. Chie, 250 F.3d 47, 56 n.10 (1st Cir. 2001) ("Thus, without using the burden-shifting model, we simply assume dubitante that the evidence Lesley has put forward is sufficient to require us to consider Dr. Chie’s reasons for his referral.").
- Reed v. LePage Bakeries, Inc., 244 F.3d 254, 262 (1st Cir. 2001) ("In any event, even were we to assume dubitante that Reed adequately requested an accommodation allowing her to walk away from conflicts with supervisors, Reed was never prevented from exercising such accommodation during her June 1, 1996 meeting with Callahan".)
- United States v. Brady, 168 F.3d 574, 580 (1st Cir. 1999) ("But a significant purpose to obstruct is enough, even if we assume dubitante that a pure desire not to rat would avoid the obstruction charge").
- Soileau v. Guilford of Maine, Inc., 105 F.3d 12, 15 (1st Cir. 1997) ("assuming, dubitante, that a colorable claim may be made that 'ability to get along with others' is or may be ... a major life activity under the ADA ...").
- Lehtimaki and Others v Cooper [2020] UKSC 33, a case before the Supreme Court of the United Kingdom (Lord Reed: "[Concurring] ... with some reluctance, as I found the judgment of the Court of Appeal more persuasive than have your Ladyship and your Lordships, but in deference to the unanimity of the other members of the court as to the outcome of this appeal, and bearing in mind that the facts of this case seem unlikely ever to be replicated, I concur in the order proposed.")
