= Phillip Davidson =

Phillip B. Davidson Jr.
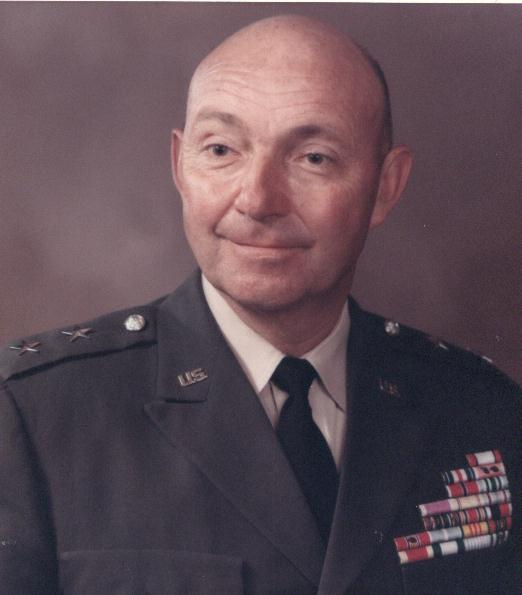
- Born: November 26, 1915; Hachita, New Mexico
- Died: February 7, 1996 (aged 80); San Antonio, Texas
- Burial place: Arlington National Cemetery
- Military career
- Allegiance: United States
- Branch: United States Army
- Service years: 1939–1974
- Rank: Lieutenant General
- Conflicts: World War II; Korean War; Vietnam War
- Awards: Army Distinguished Service Medal; Silver Star; Legion of Merit (3); Bronze Star Medal; Purple Heart
- Other work: Author

Phillip Buford Davidson Jr. (November 26, 1915 – February 7, 1996) was an American lieutenant general who served in World War II, the Korean War, and the Vietnam War. Davidson was also one of the two men who is credited for creating the modern Intelligence Cycle while serving as a staffer at United States Army Command and General Staff College, alongside Robert R. Glass.

== Biography ==
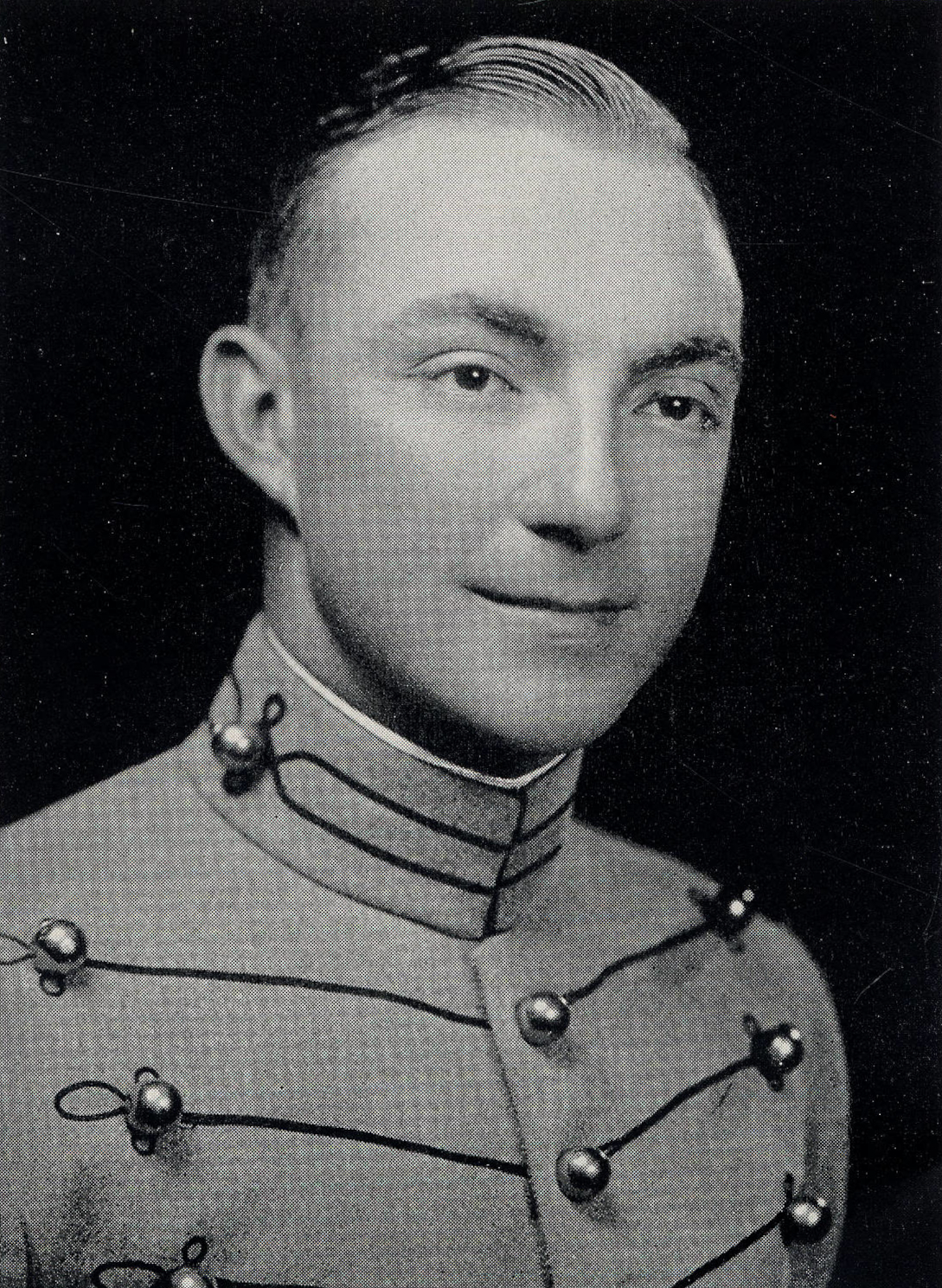
Davidson as a West Point cadet in 1939

Davidson was born on November 26, 1915, in Hachita, New Mexico. Davidson attended West Point, graduating in 1939. During World War II, he served as assistant intelligence officer in the 96th Infantry Division. Later, he served as a squadron commander in George S. Patton's Third Army in Western Europe.

Following the war, he was assigned as an instructor to the Army's School of Intelligence in Fort Leavenworth, Kansas.

Starting in 1948 and continuing throughout the Korean War, Davidson was chief, Plans and Estimates Branch, in General Douglas MacArthur's intelligence office. It was during this time that occurred one of the US Army's greatest intelligence failures in history - not predicting Chinese intervention in the Korean War.

In 1969, while assigned as commanding General of the Army training center at Fort Ord, California, Davidson was the respondent in the United States Supreme Court decision Parisi v. Davidson. In that case, the court granted habeas relief to a soldier seeking an honorable discharge as a conscientious objector.

During the Vietnam War, 1967 until 1969, Davidson was the chief of US military intelligence in Vietnam, under the command of William Westmoreland and later Creighton Abrams. From May 3, 1971, to September 30, 1972, Davidson, then a major general, was the Assistant Chief of Staff for Intelligence, Headquarters, Department of the Army. He was later promoted to lieutenant general.

In 1988, he published Vietnam at War: The History 1946–1975, which is widely regarded as one of the most comprehensive accounts of the Indochina wars. He followed it up in 1990 with Secrets of the Vietnam War, where he described his experiences in Vietnam.

Davidson died on February 7, 1996, in San Antonio, Texas. He is buried in Arlington National Cemetery.

Davidson is a member of the Military Intelligence Hall of Fame.

== Military decorations ==
Lieutenant general Davidson received many decorations during his military service:

Army Distinguished Service Medal
Silver Star
Legion of Merit with two Oak Leaf Clusters
Bronze Star Medal
Joint Service Commendation Medal
Purple Heart
American Defense Service Medal
American Campaign Medal
European-African-Middle Eastern Campaign Medal with four Service Stars
World War II Victory Medal
Army of Occupation Medal
National Defense Service Medal with Oak Leaf Cluster
Korean Service Medal
Vietnam Service Medal
United Nations Korea Medal
French Croix de Guerre 1939–1945 with Palm
Vietnam Campaign Medal
