= Tripflare =

Enemy-triggered battlefield illumination device

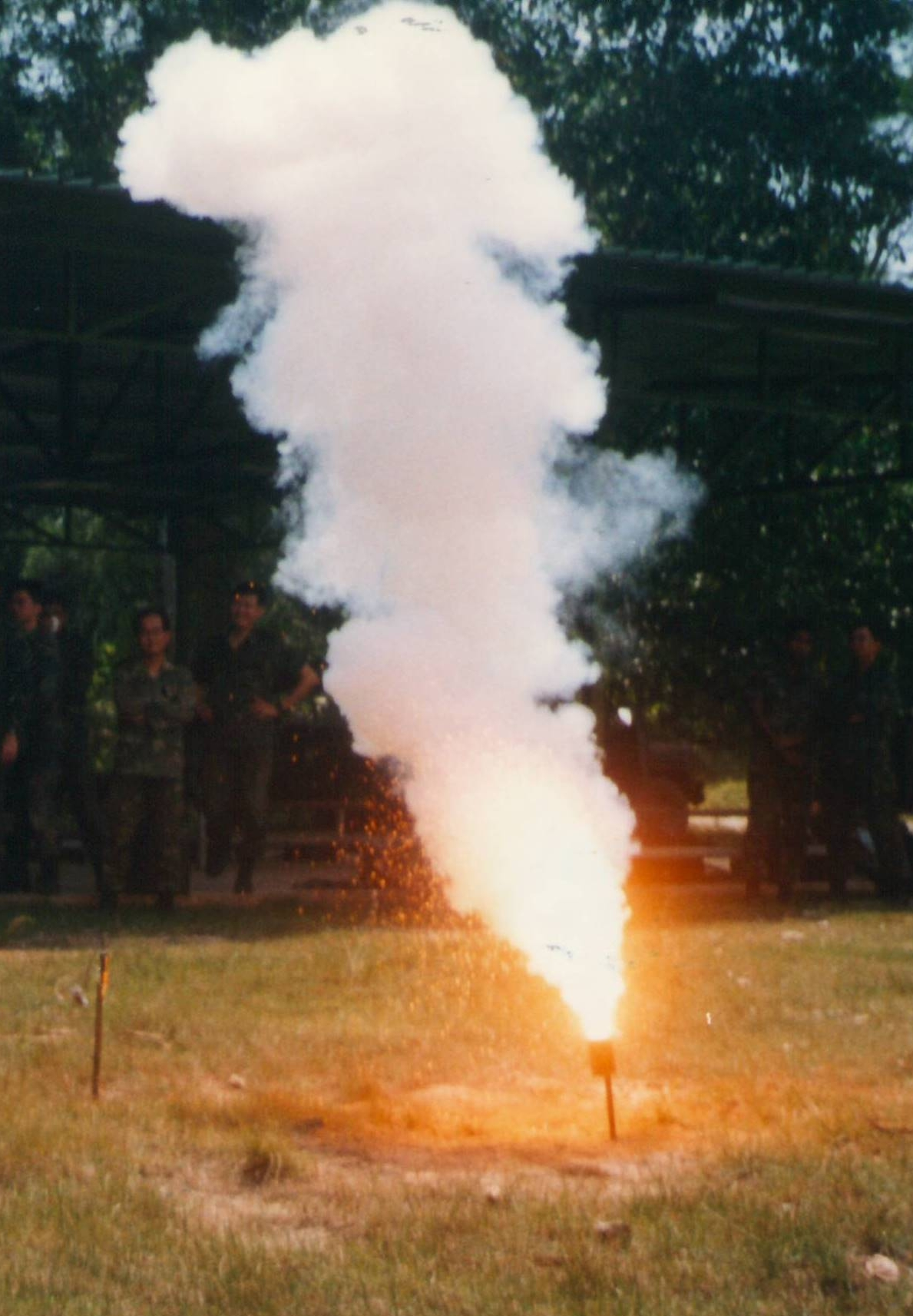
A tripflare igniting

A tripflare is a device used by military forces to secure an area and to guard against infiltration. It consists of tripwire around the area, linked to one or more flares. When the tripwire is triggered, as by someone unsuspectingly disturbing it, the flare is activated and begins burning. The light from the flare simultaneously warns that the perimeter may have been breached and also gives light for investigating. In defensive operations, tripflares are usually placed in predetermined kill zones with machine guns sighted on them.

== Construction ==
United States military tripflares are issued with a fuse resembling that found on the M67 grenade. The difference is that the tripflare uses a pull fuse. This type of fuse detonates the flare immediately following spoon release. Also, the pin does not have either the ring, or the split pin of other grenades. Instead it is double ended, one end acts as a safety clipping into both sides of the fuse body, while the other side is a straight pin allowing for easy removal. The flare is shipped with a metal mounting bracket that allows the grenade shaped flare to be mounted on a stake, tree, or other suitable vertical object. One end of the bracket has a point allowing it to be driven into the ground, while the other end has a spring loaded spoon holder that allows for two way release. The soldier installing the flare can use this feature to set up the tension so that if the trip wire is detected and cut the flare still ignites.

== 1971 Thiokol accident ==
On February 3, 1971, an explosion at a trip flare munitions plant in Woodbine, Georgia, killed 29 and injured 50 people. Earlier in 1967, the United States Army misclassified the chemical used as a Class 2 flammable, instead of the more dangerous Class 7 explosive, which would have required stricter safety protocols. In November 1970, the Army fixed their mistake, reclassifying the material as Class 7, three months prior to the accident. The notification of the change was forgotten in an officer's desk drawer, and the plant was not informed until 22 days after the explosion. The Army was found negligent and settled with the families of the victims for less than $20 million.
