= List of United States Supreme Court cases by the Burger Court =

Supreme Court of the United States
Burger Court
- Warren Court ← → Rehnquist Court
- June 23, 1969 – September 26, 1986 (17 years, 95 days)
- Seat: Supreme Court Building; Washington, D.C.
- No. of positions: 9
- Burger Court decisions

This is a partial chronological list of cases decided by the United States Supreme Court during the Burger Court, the tenure of Chief Justice Warren Earl Burger from June 23, 1969 through September 26, 1986.

Case name	Citation	Summary
Anderson's-Black Rock, Inc. v. Pavement Salvage Co.	396 U.S. 57 (1969)	Standard of nonobviousness in U.S. patent law
Alexander v. Holmes County Board of Education	396 U.S. 1218 (1969)	Delays in school desegregation
Goldberg v. Kelly	397 U.S. 254 (1970)	Procedural due process, hearing requirement
In re Winship	397 U.S. 358 (1970)	When a juvenile is charged with an act which would be a crime if committed by an adult, every element of the offense must be proved beyond a reasonable doubt
Waller v. Florida	397 U.S. 387 (1970)	Collateral estoppel as applied to the same factual situation in criminal trials, double jeopardy
Ashe v. Swenson	397 U.S. 436 (1970)	Same as in Waller v. Florida, above
Walz v. Tax Commission of the City of New York	397 U.S. 664 (1970)	Tax exemption for churches
Rowan v. U. S. Post Office Dept.	397 U.S. 728 (1970)	Addressees have unreviewable discretion to refuse further mail from a given sender; senders do not have a constitutional right to keep someone on a mailing list for unwanted mail
Welsh v. United States	398 U.S. 333 (1970)	The meaning of religion in determining conscientious objector status
Williams v. Florida	399 U.S. 78 (1970)	Twelve-man jury
North Carolina v. Alford	400 U.S. 25 (1970)	Guilty plea in criminal case
Oregon v. Mitchell	400 U.S. 112 (1970)	Age and voting rights in state elections
Massachusetts v. Laird	400 U.S. 886 (1970)	Court declined to hear a case related to the constitutionality of the Vietnam War
Baird v. State Bar of Arizona	401 U.S. 1 (1971)	states cannot ban people from legal practice due to Communist party membership
In re Stolar	401 U.S. 23 (1971)	A state cannot require bar applicants to list every organization he or she belonged to since starting law school—decided same day as Baird v. State Bar of Arizona
Younger v. Harris	401 U.S. 37 (1971)	Abstention doctrine
Citizens to Preserve Overton Park v. Volpe	401 U.S. 402 (1971)	Judicial review of administrative agency actions
Griggs v. Duke Power Co.	401 U.S. 424 (1971)	Employment discrimination; disparate effect of employer practices
Haywood v. National Basketball Association	401 U.S. 1204 (1971)	Sherman Antitrust Act applied to the NBA
Swann v. Charlotte-Mecklenburg Board of Education	402 U.S. 1 (1971)	Use of busing for school desegregation
Richardson v. Perales	402 U.S. 389 (1971)	Physicians' written reports of medical examinations of a disability claimant could constitute "substantial evidence" supportive of finding non-disability under the Social Security Act
California v. Byers	402 U.S. 424 (1971)	Statute requiring drivers to provide personal information at the scene of an accident does not infringe on one's Fifth Amendment privilege against self-incrimination
United States v. Thirty-seven Photographs	402 U.S. 363 (1971)	Constitutionality of ban on importation of obscene material
Coates v. Cincinnati	402 U.S. 611 (1971)	Criminal offenses on sidewalk
Cohen v. California	403 U.S. 15 (1971)	Freedom of speech, fighting words/obscenity, “fuck the draft”
Bivens v. Six Unknown Named Agents	403 U.S. 388 (1971)	Implied right of action in the Fourth Amendment
Lemon v. Kurtzman	403 U.S. 602 (1971)	Laws without a secular purpose violate the Establishment Clause
Clay v. United States	403 U.S. 698 (1971)	Since the Appeal Board gave no reason for the denial of a conscientious objector exemption, petitioner's conviction must be reversed
New York Times Co. v. United States	403 U.S. 713 (1971)	Freedom of the press, national security, Pentagon Papers
Reed v. Reed	404 U.S. 71 (1971)	Extended Fourteenth Amendment rights to women
Parisi v. Davidson	405 U.S. 34 (1972)	Conscientious objector status
Papachristou v. Jacksonville	405 U.S. 156 (1972)	Vagrancy ordinance held void for vagueness
FTC v. Sperry & Hutchinson Trading Stamp Co.	405 U.S. 233 (1972)	FTC may act against a company’s “unfair” business practices even though the practice is not an antitrust violation
Hawaii v. Standard Oil Co. of California	405 U.S. 251 (1972)	States cannot sue for general economic damage due to violation of antitrust laws
Cruz v. Beto	405 U.S. 319 (1972)	Free exercise of religion while in prison custody
Commissioner v. First Security Bank of Utah, N.A.	405 U.S. 394 (1972)	Tax reporting for banks prohibited from doing insurance business
Eisenstadt v. Baird	405 U.S. 438 (1972)	Privacy, birth control
Stanley v. Illinois	405 U.S. 645 (1972)	Men's rights; state cannot make children of unwed widowed fathers wards of the state without a hearing
Sierra Club v. Morton	405 U.S. 727 (1972)	Standing in cases in which plaintiffs assert interest in aesthetic or recreational interest in property (in this case, Mineral King area)
Wisconsin v. Yoder	406 U.S. 205 (1972)	Freedom of religion, high school education
Apodaca v. Oregon	406 U.S. 404 (1972)	State juries may convict a defendant by less than unanimity
Jackson v. Indiana	406 U.S. 715 (1972)	Indefinite detention of a defendant incompetent to stand trial violates due process and equal protection
Aikens v. California	406 U.S. 813 (1972)	Mootness in a death penalty case
The Bremen v. Zapata Off-Shore Company	407 U.S. 1 (1972)	Enforceability of a forum selection clause
Fuentes v. Shevin	407 U.S. 67 (1972)	Opportunity to be heard
Pennsylvania v. New York	407 U.S. 223 (1972)	State of escheat for unclaimed money orders
Flood v. Kuhn	407 U.S. 258 (1972)	Baseball and antitrust regulation
United States v. U.S. District Court	407 U.S. 297 (1972)	Fourth Amendment, Search and seizure, search warrants, wiretapping
Barker v. Wingo	407 U.S. 514 (1972)	Sixth Amendment and speedy trial
Lloyd Corp. v. Tanner	407 U.S. 551 (1972)	First Amendment; private property; rights
Laird v. Tatum	408 U.S. 1 (1972)	Freedom of speech rights cannot be chilled by the mere existence of government surveillance and data gathering
Kois v. Wisconsin	408 U.S. 229 (1972)	Nude photographs accompanying and rationally related to a newspaper story are entitled to constitutional free press protection
Furman v. Georgia	408 U.S. 238 (1972)	Death penalty is cruel and unusual punishment under the Eighth Amendment; overruled by Gregg v. Georgia
Board of Regents v. Roth	408 U.S. 564 (1972)	Procedural due process in firing non-tenured professor
Perry v. Sindermann	408 U.S. 593 (1972)	First Amendment; de facto professor tenure
Gravel v. United States	408 U.S. 606 (1972)	Protection offered by the Speech or Debate Clause to non-legislative activity
Branzburg v. Hayes	408 U.S. 665 (1972)	First Amendment; grand jury, journalists’ rights
Kleindienst v. Mandel	408 U.S. 753 (1972)	U.S. Attorney General’s power to deny persons’ entry to the United States
Gottschalk v. Benson	409 U.S. 63 (1972)	Computer algorithms not considered patentable subject matter
Bronston v. United States	409 U.S. 352 (1973)	Literally truthful statements under oath cannot be prosecuted as perjury even if intent was to mislead questioner
United States v. Dionisio	410 U.S. 1 (1973)	Compelled production of voice samples and the Fourth and Fifth Amendment.
United States v. Mara aka Marasovich	410 U.S. 19 (1973)	Compelled production of handwriting samples
United States v. Glaxo Group Ltd.	410 U.S. 52 (1973)	When a patent is directly involved in an antitrust violation, the government may challenge the patent’s validity
Roe v. Wade	410 U.S. 113 (1973)	Abortion, due process, privacy
Doe v. Bolton	410 U.S. 179 (1973)	Restrictions on abortion
United States v. Florida East Coast Railway Co.	410 U.S. 224 (1973)	Due process right to a hearing when administrative rules are to be changed
San Antonio Independent School Dist. v. Rodriguez	411 U.S. 1 (1973)	Equal protection, education
Mescalero Apache Tribe v. Jones	411 U.S. 145 (1973)	Indian taxation by states
McClanahan v. Arizona State Tax Comm'n	411 U.S. 164 (1973)	Indian taxation by states
United States v. Russell	411 U.S. 423 (1973)	Active government agent involvement in criminal conspiracy does not constitute entrapment; Rehnquist inadvertently creates possible "outrageous government conduct" standard
Frontiero v. Richardson	411 U.S. 677 (1973)	Equal protection, gender discrimination in military dependency regulation
Gagnon v. Scarpelli	411 U.S. 778 (1973)	Probation hearings and due process
McDonnell Douglas Corp. v. Green	411 U.S. 792 (1973)	Standard of proof in employment discrimination cases
Schneckloth v. Bustamonte	412 U.S. 218 (1973)	Voluntary searches are permissible without the knowledge to refuse them
United States v. Students Challenging Regulatory Agency Procedures (SCRAP)	412 U.S. 669 (1973)	Standing to sue
Miller v. California	413 U.S. 15 (1973)	Freedom of speech, Miller test for obscenity
United States v. 12 200-ft. Reels of Film	413 U.S. 123 (1973)	Ban on importing obscene material stands but material to be reevaluated under Miller test
Pittsburgh Press Co. v. Pittsburgh Commission on Human Relations	413 U.S. 376 (1973)	Freedom of the press, discriminatory commercial speech in classified advertising
Norwood v. Harrison	413 U.S. 455 (1973)	Equal protection does not require equal state assistance to public and private schools and forbids assistance to private schools that discriminate on the basis of race
Broadrick v. Oklahoma	413 U.S. 601 (1973)	Overbreadth of Oklahoma statute forbidding political activities by state employees
Espinoza v. Farah Mfg. Co.	414 U.S. 86 (1973)	Employers can refuse to hire foreign citizens without violating their civil rights
North Dakota State Board of Pharmacy v. Snyder's Drug Stores, Inc.	414 U.S. 156 (1973)	Court upholds North Dakota pharmacy ownership statute against substantive due process attack
Lau v. Nichols	414 U.S. 563 (1974)	Foreign-language education and discrimination under the Civil Rights Act of 1964
Cleveland Board of Education v. LaFleur	414 U.S. 632 (1974)	Overly restrictive maternity leave regulations in public schools violate the Due Process Clause of the Fourteenth Amendment
Schlesinger v. Holtzman	414 U.S. 1316 (1973)	Presidential war power
United States v. Matlock	415 U.S. 164 (1974)	Fourth Amendment, search and seizure, "co-occupant consent rule"
Morton v. Ruiz	415 U.S. 199 (1974)	Administrative law, Bureau of Indian Affairs improperly limited eligibility for general assistance benefits
Johnson v. Robison	415 U.S. 361 (1974)	Different benefits for combat veterans and conscientious objectors does not violate equal protection or the free exercise clause
Edelman v. Jordan	415 U.S. 651 (1974)	Eleventh Amendment and disability payments
Storer v. Brown	415 U.S. 724 (1974)	Political campaign laws
Village of Belle Terre v. Boraas	416 U.S. 1 (1974)	Upholding a zoning ordinance which prevented multiple unrelated people from living together
Arnett v. Kennedy	416 U.S. 134 (1974)	Due process rights of fired public employees; Rehnquist's "bitter with the sweet" concept of property interests
DeFunis v. Odegaard	416 U.S. 312 (1974)	Mootness
Bob Jones University v. Simon	416 U.S. 725 (1974)	A private university, notified by the IRS, about a new policy of denying tax-exempt status for private schools with racially discriminatory admissions policies. Petitioner sued for injunctive relief to prevent revocation
Geduldig v. Aiello	417 U.S. 484 (1974)	Denial of benefits for work loss resulting from normal pregnancy does not violate the Equal Protection Clause
Morton v. Mancari	417 U.S. 535 (1974)	Hiring preferences given by Congress to Native Americans at the Bureau of Indian Affairs are not violative of the Due Process Clause of the Fifth Amendment.
Commissioner v. Idaho Power Co.	418 U.S. 1 (1974)	Income tax, capitalization of costs related to acquisition of capital assets
Jenkins v. Georgia	418 U.S. 153 (1974)	Obscenity; motion picture Carnal Knowledge
Miami Herald Publishing Co. v. Tornillo	418 U.S. 241 (1974)	Freedom of speech
Gertz v. Robert Welch, Inc.	418 U.S. 323 (1974)	First Amendment and defamation—narrowing New York Times v. Sullivan
United States v. Nixon	418 U.S. 683 (1974)	Judicial review, executive privilege, separation of powers
Milliken v. Bradley	418 U.S. 717 (1974)	Segregation, busing
Taylor v. Louisiana	419 U.S. 522 (1975)	Women cannot be excluded from a jury pool, overturning Hoyt v. Florida
Goss v. Lopez	419 U.S. 565 (1974)	Due process in suspending a student from school
NLRB v. J. Weingarten, Inc.	420 U.S. 251 (1975)	The Weingarten rights—rights of union members facing disciplinary proceedings
Lefkowitz v. Newsome	420 U.S. 283 (1975)	Guilty pleas in state court and federal habeas corpus proceeding
United States v. Feola	420 U.S. 671 (1975)	Mens rea requirement for conspiracy is no greater than that for the substantive crime
Schlesinger v. Councilman	420 U.S. 738 (1975)	Scope and jurisdiction of courts martial
Stanton v. Stanton	421 U.S. 7 (1975)	Different ages of majority in the context of child support did not pass rational basis review regarding equal protection
Dunlop v. Bachowski	421 U.S. 560 (1975)	Judicial power and judicial review
United States v. Park	421 U.S. 658 (1975)	Criminal liability of chief executive officer of a corporation for the misdeeds of the company
Blue Chip Stamps v. Manor Drug Stores	421 U.S. 723 (1975)	Private damages actions under Rule 10b-5 is confined to actual purchasers or sellers of securities
Bigelow v. Virginia	421 U.S. 809 (1975)	First Amendment and commercial speech
Cort v. Ash	422 U.S. 66 (1975)	Election law, implied cause of action
Erznoznik v. City of Jacksonville	422 U.S. 205 (1975)	City ordinance prohibiting the showing of films containing nudity by a drive-in theater violated First Amendment
City of Richmond v. United States	422 U.S. 358 (1975)	Limited Richmond, Virginia's right to annex land from surrounding counties
Warth v. Seldin	422 U.S. 490 (1975)	Law of standing
United States v. Peltier	422 U.S. 531 (1975)	Exclusionary Rule Not Applicable when officer relied on statute subsequently ruled unconstitutional
O'Connor v. Donaldson	422 U.S. 563 (1975)	Institutionalization of a non-dangerous mentally ill person
Faretta v. California	422 U.S. 806 (1975)	Criminal defendants have the constitutional right to refuse counsel
United States v. Brignoni-Ponce	422 U.S. 873 (1975)	The Fourth Amendment requires reasonable suspicion for border patrol agents to stop vehicles near the border and ask about citizenship and immigration status; apparent Mexican ancestry does not qualify
Rose v. Locke	423 U.S. 48 (1975)	Vagueness of a law against cunnilingus
Rizzo v. Goode	423 U.S. 362 (1976)	Federalism and injunctions against city officials
Buckley v. Valeo	424 U.S. 1 (1976)	First Amendment and campaign finance reform
Mathews v. Eldridge	424 U.S. 319 (1976)	Procedural due process for termination of Social Security benefits
Imbler v. Pachtman	424 U.S. 409 (1976)	Immunity of prosecutors when acting within their official capacity
Time, Inc. v. Firestone	424 U.S. 448 (1976)	Rights of the media and public figures in defamation suits
Colorado River Water Conservation District v. United States	424 U.S. 800 (1976)	Abstention doctrine
Dann v. Johnston	425 U.S. 219 (1976)	Early case on the patentability of the business method patent
Hills v. Gautreaux	425 U.S. 284 (1976)	Fifth Amendment and Civil Rights Act of 1964
United States v. Miller (1976)	425 U.S. 435 (1976)	Fourth Amendment regarding financial information
Hampton v. United States	425 U.S. 484 (1976)	Entrapment and drug distribution
Estelle v. Williams	425 U.S. 501 (1976)	Trying a criminal defendant while he is clad in prison garb violates due process
Virginia State Pharmacy Board v. Virginia Citizens Consumer Council	425 U.S. 748 (1976)	Commercial speech—advertising prescription drug prices
Washington v. Davis	426 U.S. 229 (1976)	Equal protection
Bryan v. Itasca County	426 U.S. 373 (1976)	State taxation of Indians
TSC Industries, Inc. v. Northway, Inc.	426 U.S. 438 (1976)	Materiality of false or misleading statements in proxy statements under the Securities Exchange Act of 1934
Kleppe v. New Mexico	426 U.S. 529 (1976)	Protection of animals on land held by the Bureau of Land Management
Doyle v. Ohio	426 U.S. 610 (1976)	Impeaching a defendant with his silence in response to the warnings required by Miranda v. Arizona violates the Fifth Amendment
Serbian Orthodox Diocese v. Milivojevich	426 U.S. 696 (1976)	Judicial determination of internal disputes of church governance violates the Establishment Clause
Hughes v. Alexandria Scrap Corp.	426 U.S. 794 (1976)	"Market participant exception" to the Dormant Commerce Clause
National League of Cities v. Usery	426 U.S. 833 (1976)	Tenth Amendment sufficient to invalidate federal Fair Labor Standards Act; overruled by Garcia v. San Antonio Metropolitan Transit Authority
Young v. American Mini Theatres	427 U.S. 50 (1976)	Upholding Detroit's ordinance regulating location of adult-oriented businesses
Runyon v. McCrary	427 U.S. 160 (1976)	Race discrimination in private school admissions under 42 U.S.C. § 1981
New Orleans v. Dukes	427 U.S. 297 (1976)	Equal protection does not limit a state's regulatory power regarding grandfather clauses
Fitzpatrick v. Bitzer	427 U.S. 445 (1976)	Limitations imposed by the Eleventh Amendment on damages paid by states under Title VII
Nebraska Press Association v. Stuart	427 U.S. 529 (1976)	Standards for regulating publicity in advance of a criminal trial
Planned Parenthood of Central Missouri v. Danforth	428 U.S. 52 (1976)	Constitutionality of various abortion regulations; the first such challenge after Roe v. Wade
Gregg v. Georgia	428 U.S. 153 (1976)	Capital punishment does not per se violate the Eighth Amendment
Woodson v. North Carolina	428 U.S. 280 (1976)	Mandatory death penalties and capital punishment
South Dakota v. Opperman	428 U.S. 364 (1976)	Searching an impounded vehicle is permissible under the Fourth Amendment
United States v. Janis	428 U.S. 433 (1976)	Exclusionary rule does not apply in civil forfeiture proceedings
Stone v. Powell	428 U.S. 465 (1976)	Violations of the exclusionary rule may not be asserted in federal habeas corpus proceedings
United States v. Martinez-Fuerte	428 U.S. 543 (1976)	Routine stops of vehicles entering the United States made by the Border Patrol do not violate the Fourth Amendment
Estelle v. Gamble	429 U.S. 97 (1976)	Deliberate indifference to prisoner medical needs is required to make out a violation of the Eighth Amendment
Craig v. Boren	429 U.S. 190 (1976)	Sex discrimination in drinking ages
Arlington Heights v. Metropolitan Housing Corp.	429 U.S. 252 (1977)	Discriminatory intent required to make out a violation of the Equal Protection Clause
Mt. Healthy City School District Board Of Education v. Doyle	429 U.S. 274 (1977)	School districts are not arms of the state and cannot claim sovereign immunity under the Eleventh Amendment; First Amendment rights of public employees subject to adverse employment action possibly related to protected expression.
Whalen v. Roe	429 U.S. 589 (1977)	The New York State Controlled Substance Act's requirement that doctors send a copy of prescriptions to the state department of health did not violate privacy rights
Califano v. Goldfarb	430 U.S. 199 (1977)	Differing Social Security benefits for widows and widowers violates equal protection
Complete Auto Transit, Inc. v. Brady	430 U.S. 274 (1977)	Constitutional requirements for imposing state business privilege taxes on out-of-state corporations
Brewer v. Williams	430 U.S. 387 (1977)	"Christian burial speech" case. Sixth Amendment requires criminal defendants to have counsel during police interrogation conducted after indictment
Ingraham v. Wright	430 U.S. 651 (1977)	Corporal punishment of public school students
Wooley v. Maynard	430 U.S. 705 (1977)	State cannot compel citizens to display the state motto upon their vehicle license plates
Bounds v. Smith	430 U.S. 817 (1977)	Right of prisoners to access the courts requires prisons to furnish legal assistance
Linmark Associates, Inc., v. Township of Willingboro	431 U.S. 85 (1977)	Municipality's ban on real estate signs unconstitutionally inhibited commercial speech
Abood v. Detroit Board of Education	431 U.S. 209 (1977)	Compelling non-union members to support union political activities violates the First Amendment
Moore v. City of East Cleveland	431 U.S. 494 (1977)	Zoning ordinances forbidding extended families to live in the same house violate due process
Carey v. Population Services International	431 U.S. 678 (1977)	Availability of contraceptives to girls under the age of 16
National Socialist Party of America v. Village of Skokie	432 U.S. 43 (1977)	Procedure to be afforded those denied the right to march
Hunt v. Washington State Apple Advertising Commission	432 U.S. 333 (1977)	Dormant Commerce Clause
Beal v. Doe	432 U.S. 438 (1977)	Right of a state to restrict use of federal funds for abortion
United States v. Chadwick	433 U.S. 1 (1977)	Warrantless search of double-locked luggage just placed in the trunk of a parked vehicle is not justified under the automobile exception to the Fourth Amendment
Shaffer v. Heitner	433 U.S. 186 (1977)	Quasi in rem jurisdiction and minimum contacts
Bates v. State Bar of Arizona	433 U.S. 350 (1977)	First Amendment constraints on advertising by lawyers
Nixon v. Administrator of General Services	433 U.S. 425 (1977)	Papers of President Nixon
Zacchini v. Scripps-Howard Broadcasting Co.	433 U.S. 562 (1977)	First Amendment limitations on suits for invasion of privacy
Coker v. Georgia	433 U.S. 584 (1977)	death penalty for rape unconstitutional under the Eighth Amendment
Commissioner v. Kowalski	433 U.S. 77 (1977)	Taxation of meals furnished by an employer. [1]In this case, the Court interpreted Internal Revenue Code §119(a)-(b)(4) and (d) and Treas. Reg. §1.119-1
Arlington County Board v. Richards	434 U.S. 5 (1977)	Residential zoned parking is constitutional as classification based on residency alone does not violate the Equal Protection Clause as long as it is rationally related to a legitimate state objective.
Pennsylvania v. Mimms	434 U.S. 106 (1977)	Applying Terry v. Ohio to car passengers
Moore v. Illinois	434 U.S. 220 (1977)	Sixth Amendment requires a criminal defendant to counsel at a lineup conducted after being indicted
Browder v. Director, Department of Corrections	434 U.S. 257 (1978)	Federal courts of appeals lack jurisdiction to hear untimely filed appeals
Pfizer, Inc. v. Government of India	434 U.S. 308 (1978)	Foreign nations, who may sue in federal court, may also obtain triple damages for violations of the Clayton Act
Bordenkircher v. Hayes	434 U.S. 357 (1978)	Prosecutors may threaten defendants with more serious charges in order to induce a guilty plea
Zablocki v. Redhail	434 U.S. 374 (1978)	Marriage as a fundamental right
Oliphant v. Suquamish Indian Tribe	435 U.S. 191 (1978)	Indian tribal courts do not have inherent criminal jurisdiction to try and to punish non-Indians
Ballew v. Georgia	435 U.S. 223 (1978)	Juries in criminal trials may not have fewer than six members
Lakeside v. Oregon	435 U.S. 333 (1978)	Jury instructions regarding the right against self-incrimination and refusal to testify
Stump v. Sparkman	435 U.S. 349 (1978)	Judicial immunity
Vermont Yankee Nuclear Power Corp. v. Natural Resources Defense Council, Inc.	435 U.S. 519 (1978)	Judicial deference to government agencies
Frank Lyon Co. v. United States	435 U.S. 561 (1978)	Ownership of realty in sale-leaseback for tax deduction for depreciation purposes.
McDaniel v. Paty	435 U.S. 618 (1978)	Qualification of ministers to hold political office
Elkins v. Moreno	435 U.S. 647 (1978)	In-state tuition at state universities for non-citizen students
First National Bank of Boston v. Bellotti	435 U.S. 765 (1978)	First Amendment and corporate political contributions
Landmark Communications, Inc. v. Virginia	435 U.S. 829 (1978)	Press freedom in judicial discipline proceedings
Santa Clara Pueblo v. Martinez	436 U.S. 49 (1978)	Sovereign immunity of Indian tribes
Flagg Bros., Inc. v. Brooks	436 U.S. 149 (1978)	Upholding section of New York Uniform Commercial Code permitting repossession of goods by warehouse
Slodov v. United States	436 U.S. 238 (1978)	Withholding payroll taxes accrued before sale of business are the personal responsibility of the seller
Baldwin v. Fish and Game Commission of Montana	436 U.S. 371 (1978)	Affirmed the right of the state of Montana to charge higher fees for out-of-state elk hunters
Taylor v. Kentucky	436 U.S. 378 (1978)	Instructing the jury in a criminal trial on the presumption of innocence and the meaning of proof beyond a reasonable doubt
Ohralik v. Ohio State Bar Association	436 U.S. 447 (1978)	State regulation of in-person solicitation of clients by lawyers
Zurcher v. Stanford Daily	436 U.S. 547 (1978)	Standards for issuing search warrants to third parties; special First Amendment protections for the press in keeping evidence of possible crimes
Monell v. Department of Social Services	436 U.S. 658 (1978)	Liability of municipal officials for violations of constitutional rights; they are not liable for merely employing the person who violated the person's rights, and do not enjoy absolute immunity for their actions
Exxon Corp. v. Governor of Maryland	437 U.S. 117 (1978)	Dormant Commerce Clause and state petroleum regulation
Tennessee Valley Authority v. Hill	437 U.S. 153 (1978)	Interpretation of the Endangered Species Act
Owen Equipment & Erection Co. v. Kroger	437 U.S. 365 (1978)	Joinder and diversity jurisdiction
Mincey v. Arizona	437 U.S. 385 (1978)	Fourth Amendment does not provide a "murder scene exception" to the warrant-and-probable-cause requirement
Parker v. Flook	437 U.S. 584 (1978)	Algorithms and patent law
City of Philadelphia v. New Jersey	437 U.S. 617 (1978)	Dormant Commerce Clause prohibits banning importation of trash into a state
United States v. John (1978)	437 U.S. 634 (1978)	Federal government has exclusive jurisdiction under Major Crimes Act for serious offenses committed on an Indian reservation
Duke Power Co. v. Carolina Environmental Study Group	438 U.S. 59 (1978)	Constitutionality of Price-Anderson Nuclear Industries Indemnity Act
Penn Central Transportation Co. v. New York City	438 U.S. 104 (1978)	Substantive due process, taking clause, landmarks preservation
Franks v. Delaware	438 U.S. 154 (1978)	Challenging false statements made in support of issuing a search warrant
Regents of the University of California v. Bakke	438 U.S. 265 (1978)	Racial discrimination, affirmative action
Lockett v. Ohio	438 U.S. 586 (1978)	Mitigating evidence required by the Eighth Amendment in capital sentencing proceedings
FCC v. Pacifica Foundation	438 U.S. 726 (1978)	FCC policing of obscenity
Rakas v. Illinois	439 U.S. 128 (1978)	Asserting the Fourth Amendment rights of third persons
Marquette Nat. Bank of Minneapolis v. First of Omaha Service Corp.	439 U.S. 299 (1978)	State anti-usury laws cannot be enforced against nationally chartered banks located out of state
Parklane Hosiery Co, Inc. v. Shore	439 U.S. 322 (1979)	Preclusion doctrine
Colautti v. Franklin	439 U.S. 379 (1979)	Pennsylvania's Abortion Control Act held void for vagueness
Givhan v. Western Line Consolidated School District	439 U.S. 410 (1979)	First Amendment protects private conversations between public employees and superiors about matters of public concern
Washington v. Confederated Bands and Tribes of the Yakima Indian Nation	439 U.S. 463 (1979)	Public Law 280 allows a state to assume partial jurisdiction over Indian tribes
Thor Power Tool Company v. Commissioner	439 U.S. 522 (1979)	Income tax in the United States; depreciation of a publisher's inventory
Hisquierdo v. Hisquierdo	439 U.S. 572 (1979)	Dividing federal railroad retirement benefits under state community property laws
Scott v. Illinois	440 U.S. 367 (1979)	Sixth Amendment right to counsel applies only to crimes for which the actual penalty is imprisonment
Nevada v. Hill	440 U.S. 410 (1979)	States are not immune from suit in the courts of other states
National Labor Relations Board v. Catholic Bishop of Chicago	440 U.S. 490 (1979)	National Labor Relations Act does not extend to teachers employed by church-operated schools
New York City Transit Authority v. Beazer	440 U.S. 568 (1979)	Civil Rights Act of 1964 and legality of discrimination against methadone users
Delaware v. Prouse	440 U.S. 648 (1979)	Fourth Amendment forbids stopping a motorist to check for a driver's license in the absence of reasonable suspicion to believe the driver has violated a traffic law
United States v. Caceres	440 U.S. 741 (1979)	Fourth Amendment does not require exclusion of evidence seized in violation of governmental regulation
Burch v. Louisiana	441 U.S. 130 (1979)	At a criminal trial, a six-member trial must be unanimous
Caban v. Mohammed	441 U.S. 380 (1979)	New York law allowing an unwed mother, but not an unwed father, a veto over adoption of their child violates the Equal Protection Clause
Addington v. Texas	441 U.S. 418 (1979)	Involuntarily committing a person to a mental hospital requires a clear and convincing standard of proof
United States v. 564.54 Acres of Land	441 U.S. 506 (1979)	Takings Clause only requires payment of fair market value to landowner
Bell v. Wolfish	441 U.S. 520 (1979)	Rights of accused persons being held in prison pending trial
Cannon v. University of Chicago	441 U.S. 677 (1979)	Gender discrimination, implied cause of action
Greenholtz v. Inmates of the Nebraska Penal and Correctional Complex	442 U.S. 1 (1979)	Due process liberty interest in parole
Personnel Administrator of Massachusetts v. Feeney	442 U.S. 256 (1979)	Government employment preferences for veterans do not constitute sex discrimination
Torres v. Puerto Rico	442 U.S. 465 (1979)	Fourth Amendment applies to Puerto Rico
Sandstrom v. Montana	442 U.S. 510 (1979)	Instructing the jury on the burden of proof in criminal trials
Wilson v. Omaha Tribe	442 U.S. 653 (1979)	Federal law governs an Indian tribe's right of possession to land
Califano v. Yamasaki	442 U.S. 682 (1979)	Procedural due process and the Social Security Act
Fare v. Michael C.	442 U.S. 707 (1979)	Invocation of the Miranda rights by asking for a probation officer
Smith v. Maryland	442 U.S. 735 (1979)	Leaves call detail records outside the protection of the Fourth Amendment
Arkansas v. Sanders	442 U.S. 753 (1979)	Absent exigency, the warrantless search of personal luggage merely because it was located in an automobile lawfully stopped by the police is not justified under the automobile exception to the Fourth Amendment
United Steel Workers of America v. Weber	443 U.S. 193 (1979)	Regarding affirmative action, reverse discrimination
Gannett Co. v. DePasquale	443 U.S. 368 (1979)	Standing of the press to assert violations of the right to a public trial
Bellotti v. Baird	443 U.S. 622 (1979)	Parental notification requirements for abortion are constitutional with a judicial bypass provision
Ybarra v. Illinois	444 U.S. 85 (1979)	A person's mere presence at a place for which the police have a warrant to search does not allow the police to search that person
Goldwater v. Carter	444 U.S. 996 (1979)	Justiciability, political question doctrine
Vance v. Terrazas	444 U.S. 252 (1980)	A U.S. citizen cannot have her citizenship taken away without proof, by a preponderance of evidence, that he or she acted with an intention to relinquish that citizenship
World-Wide Volkswagen Corp v. Woodson	444 U.S. 286 (1980)	Personal jurisdiction, strict liability
Village of Schaumburg v. Citizens for a Better Environment	444 U.S. 620 (1980)	First Amendment protection for door-to-door soliciting
Trammel v. United States	445 U.S. 40 (1980)	Marital privilege under the Federal Rules of Evidence
Rummel v. Estelle	445 U.S. 263 (1980)	Life in prison with possibility of parole is not cruel and unusual punishment for a habitual offender convicted of passing bad checks
Vitek v. Jones	445 U.S. 380 (1980)	Due process liberty interest in forcible commitment to a mental hospital
Payton v. New York	445 U.S. 573 (1980)	Fourth Amendment prohibits warrantless entry into a home to effect a routine felony arrest
Owen v. City of Independence	445 U.S. 622 (1980)	Municipal liability under the Civil Rights Act
Mobile v. Bolden	446 U.S. 55 (1980)	At-Large voting system and the Fifteenth Amendment
Rhode Island v. Innis	446 U.S. 291 (1980)	Meaning of "interrogation" under Miranda v. Arizona
Cuyler v. Sullivan	446 U.S. 335 (1980)	Criminal defendant's right to counsel not saddled by a conflict of interest
Godfrey v. Georgia	446 U.S. 420 (1980)	Eighth Amendment overbreadth of an aggravating circumstance required for imposing the death penalty
United States V. Mendenhall	446 U.S. 544 (1980)	Police may obtain consent to detain a person and search them under the Fourth Amendment
Walker v. Armco Steel Corp.	446 U.S. 740 (1980)	Erie Doctrine, state statute of limitations vs. Federal Rules of Civil Procedure
Pruneyard Shopping Center v. Robins	447 U.S. 74 (1980)	Federalism, freedom of speech
Jenkins v. Anderson	447 U.S. 231 (1980)	Criminal defendant's silence prior to arrest may be held against him in court
Agins v. City of Tiburon	447 U.S. 255 (1980)	Zoning and regulatory takings
Diamond v. Chakrabarty	447 U.S. 303 (1980)	Patentability of genetically modified organisms
Consolidated Edison Co. v. Public Service Commission	447 U.S. 530 (1980)	Freedom of speech (companies including information inserts with bills)
Central Hudson Gas & Electric Corp. v. Public Service Commission	447 U.S. 557 (1980)	Commercial speech, energy company advertising
Beck v. Alabama	447 U.S. 625 (1980)	Lesser-included instructions in capital murder cases
United States v. Raddatz	447 U.S. 667 (1980)	Federal district court review of determinations by federal magistrate judges
United States v. Payner	447 U.S. 727 (1980)	Court's supervisory power does not allow application of exclusionary rule even where third party's Fourth Amendment rights were clearly violated
Maine v. Thiboutot	448 U.S. 1 (1980)	42 U.S.C. § 1983 allows suits for violations of federal statutory law
Adams v. Texas	448 U.S. 38 (1980)	Juror oaths regarding factual deliberations in capital cases
Ohio v. Roberts	448 U.S. 56 (1980)	Hearsay is admissible under the Sixth Amendment if it bears particular guarantees of trustworthiness; overruled by Crawford v. Washington
White Mountain Apache Tribe v. Bracker	448 U.S. 136 (1980)	State is not allowed to tax a non-Indian contractor who works exclusively on a reservation
Harris v. McRae	448 U.S. 297 (1980)	States not required to fund abortions
United States v. Sioux Nation of Indians	448 U.S. 371 (1980)	Seizure of Native American lands
Fullilove v. Klutznick	448 U.S. 448 (1980)	Equal protection, government contract set-aside for minority-owned businesses
Industrial Union Department v. American Petroleum Institute	448 U.S. 607 (1980)	Administrative law, determining OSHA's powers to regulate toxic chemicals in the workplace
Stone v. Graham	449 U.S. 39 (1980)	Requiring privately funded posting of the Ten Commandments in public school classrooms violates the Establishment Clause
Upjohn Co. v. United States	449 U.S. 383 (1981)	Attorney–client privilege
Minnesota v. Clover Leaf Creamery Co.	449 U.S. 456 (1981)	Ban on nonreturnable milk containers under the rational basis test of equal protection
Fedorenko v. United States	449 U.S. 490 (1981)	Revoking the citizenship of a naturalized former concentration camp guard
Diamond, Commissioner of Patents and Trademarks v. Diehr et al.	450 U.S. 175 (1981)	Patentability of machines controlled by computer software
H. L. v. Matheson	450 U.S. 398 (1981)	Upholding parental notification law for minors' abortions
Michael M. v. Superior Court of Sonoma County	450 U.S. 464 (1981)	Sex discrimination in statutory rape laws
Kassel v. Consolidated Freightways Corp.	450 U.S. 662 (1981)	Iowa state restriction on tractor trailer length violated Dormant Commerce Clause
Thomas v. Review Board of the Indiana Employment Security Division	450 U.S. 707 (1981)	religious pacifism and unemployment benefits under the Free Exercise Clause
Estelle v. Smith	451 U.S. 454 (1981)	Statements taken in violation of the Fifth and Sixth Amendment rights to counsel may not be admitted at a capital sentencing proceeding
Edwards v. Arizona	451 U.S. 477 (1981)	Police may not initiate questioning once a suspect has invoked his rights under Miranda v. Arizona
Parratt v. Taylor	451 U.S. 527 (1981)	Mere negligence does not state a claim for a due process violation under 42 U.S.C. § 1983
Lassiter v. Department of Social Services	452 U.S. 18 (1981)	Right to counsel in parental termination proceedings
Connecticut Board of Pardons v. Dumschat	452 U.S. 458 (1981)	Due process right to commutation of life sentences
Rostker v. Goldberg	453 U.S. 57 (1981)	Equal Protection Clause, women exempt from Selective Service registration
City of Newport v. Fact Concerts, Inc.	453 U.S. 247 (1981)	Punitive damages against municipalities in suits under 42 U.S.C. § 1983
Haig v. Agee	453 U.S. 280 (1981)	Power of Executive Branch to revoke passports
California v. Prysock	453 U.S. 355 (1981)	Phrasing of the warnings required by Miranda v. Arizona
New York v. Belton	453 U.S. 454 (1981)	scope of a lawful search incident to the arrest of a passenger in an automobile includes things inside the passenger compartment
Metromedia, Inc. v. City of San Diego	453 U.S. 490 (1981)	Municipal regulation of billboards under the First Amendment
Dames & Moore v. Regan	453 U.S. 654 (1981)	Executive authority over foreign affairs, International Emergency Economic Powers Act
Piper Aircraft Co. v. Reyno	454 U.S. 235 (1981)	Forum non conveniens doctrine
Widmar v. Vincent	454 U.S. 263 (1981)	Use of state university classroom space by religious student groups
Polk County v. Dodson	454 U.S. 312 (1981)	Liability under 42 U.S.C. § 1983 for violations of constitutional rights allegedly committed by public defenders
Cabell v. Chavez-Salido	454 U.S. 432 (1982)	Citizenship requirements for probation officers
Valley Forge Christian College v. Americans United for Separation of Church and State	454 U.S. 464 (1982)	Standing to sue for alleged violations of the Establishment Clause
Community Communications Co. v. City of Boulder	455 U.S. 40 (1982)	Municipalities may not allow monopolies under home rule and instead must rely on policies enacted at the state level.
Eddings v. Oklahoma	455 U.S. 104 (1982)	Scope of mitigation evidence presented at a sentencing hearing in a capital case required by the Eighth Amendment
Merrion v. Jicarilla Apache Tribe	455 U.S. 130 (1982)	Tribal sovereignty, an Indian tribe is authorized to impose a severance tax on non-Indian oil companies drilling on reservation land
United States v. Lee	455 U.S. 252 (1982)	Religious opposition to participation in Social Security
Logan v. Zimmerman Brush Co.	455 U.S. 422 (1982)	Employment discrimination claim before administrative state agency is protected property interest; due process rights are violated by statute requiring agency to extinguish claim for administrative reasons where complainant had followed procedure
Hoffman Estates v. The Flipside, Hoffman Estates, Inc.	455 U.S. 498 (1982)	Overbreadth doctrine does not apply to commercial speech
Rose v. Lundy	455 U.S. 509 (1982)	Exhaustion requirement in federal habeas proceedings
Santosky v. Kramer	455 U.S. 745 (1982)	Standard of proof in parental termination proceedings must be at least clear and convincing evidence
American Society Of Mechanical Engineers v. Hydrolevel Corp.	456 U.S. 556 (1982)	Non-profit associations are liable for treble damages under the Sherman Antitrust Act due to antitrust violations
Oregon v. Kennedy	456 U.S. 667 (1982)	Double jeopardy protections for retrial after a mistrial is granted
United States v. Ross	456 U.S. 798 (1982)	Acceptable scope of a warrantless search of an automobile that has been legitimately stopped and that the police have probable cause to believe contains contraband
Plyler v. Doe	457 U.S. 202 (1982)	Illegal immigrants and public education
Youngberg v. Romeo	457 U.S. 307 (1982)	Rights of the involuntarily committed and intellectually disabled
Nixon v. Fitzgerald	457 U.S. 731 (1982)	Qualified immunity of executive branch officials
Harlow v. Fitzgerald	457 U.S. 800 (1982)	Absolute immunity for executive branch officials
Board of Education, Island Trees School District v. Pico	457 U.S. 853 (1982)	Right to remove "objectionable" books from school libraries
Northern Pipeline Co. v. Marathon Pipe Line Co.	458 U.S. 50 (1982)	Article III of the U.S. Constitution and the Bankruptcy Code
Loretto v. Teleprompter Manhattan CATV Corp.	458 U.S. 419 (1982)	Per se rule of takings clause
Mississippi University for Women v. Hogan	458 U.S. 718 (1982)	Single-sex nursing schools and the Equal Protection Clause
New York v. Ferber	458 U.S. 747 (1982)	States may ban sexual images of minors even where material does not meet existing tests of obscenity
Enmund v. Florida	458 U.S. 782 (1982)	Felony murder and the death penalty
United States v. Valenzuela-Bernal	458 U.S. 858 (1982)	Constitutionality of deporting aliens who might give testimony in criminal alien smuggling prosecutions
NAACP v. Claiborne Hardware Co.	458 U.S. 886 (1982)	First Amendment protection for boycotts
Sporhase v. Nebraska ex rel. Douglas	458 U.S. 941 (1982)	Nebraska statute forbidding commercial exportation of water violated the Dormant Commerce Clause
Larkin v. Grendel's Den, Inc.	459 U.S. 116 (1982)	Allowing churches to veto nearby liquor licenses violates the Establishment Clause
Hewitt v. Helms	459 U.S. 460 (1983)	Procedural due process protections for prisoners transferred to administrative segregation
South Dakota v. Neville	459 U.S. 553 (1983)	Admitting evidence of refusal to submit to field sobriety tests does not violate the Fifth Amendment privilege against self-incrimination
Moses H. Cone Memorial Hospital v. Mercury Constr. Corp.	460 U.S. 1 (1983)	Colorado River abstention and enforcement of arbitration clauses in diversity
Briscoe v. LaHue	460 U.S. 325 (1983)	Title 42 U.S.C. § 1983 did not authorize a convicted state defendant to assert a claim for damages against a police officer for giving perjured testimony at the defendant's criminal trial
District of Columbia Court of Appeals v. Feldman	460 U.S. 462 (1983)	Review of state court decisions by U.S. District Courts
Florida v. Royer	460 U.S. 491 (1983)	Search and seizure of an airline passenger walking through an airport
Metropolitan Edison Co. v. People Against Nuclear Energy	460 U.S. 766 (1983)	Environmental law; psychological effects do not need to be evaluated as part of an Environmental Impact Report
Minneapolis Star Tribune Company v. Commissioner	460 U.S. 575 (1983)	Special taxes on ink and paper violate the First Amendment
Anderson v. Celebrezze	460 U.S. 780 (1983)	Filing deadlines for independent candidates may not be extraordinarily early
City of Los Angeles v. Lyons	461 U.S. 95 (1982)	Standing, requirement of plausible threat of future injury for an injunction to issue
Connick v. Myers	461 U.S. 138 (1983)	Free speech rights of public employees for public speech at work
Pacific Gas & Electric v. State Energy Resources Conservation of Development Commission	461 U.S. 190 (1983)	Preemption, nuclear power
Commissioner v. Tufts	461 U.S. 300 (1983)	Unanimous decision on when a taxpayer sells or disposes of property encumbered by a nonrecourse obligation exceeding the fair market value of the property sold, the Commissioner of Internal Revenue may require him to include in the “amount realized” the outstanding amount of the obligation; the fair market value of the property is irrelevant to this calculation.
Kolender v. Lawson	461 U.S. 352 (1983)	Requiring loiterers or wanderers on the streets to present identification and to account for their presence when requested by a police officer is unconstitutional
Heckler v. Campbell	461 U.S. 458 (1983)	HHS Secretary's power to promulgate guidelines defining disability
Regan v. Taxation with Representation of Washington	461 U.S. 540 (1983)	Restricting 501(c)(3) nonprofit organizations from engaging in political activity does not violate the First Amendment
Bob Jones University v. United States	461 U.S. 574 (1983)	Freedom of religion and tax exemptions
Illinois v. Gates	462 U.S. 213 (1983)	Validity of searches conducted pursuant to warrants predicated on an informant's tip
City of Akron v. Akron Center for Reproductive Health	462 U.S. 416 (1983)	Requiring abortions to be performed in a hospital, restricting abortion to girls over 16, and requiring a doctor to impart certain information before performing an abortion are all unconstitutional
United States v. Place	462 U.S. 696 (1983)	Dog sniff is not a search under the Fourth Amendment
INS v. Chadha	462 U.S. 919 (1983)	Unconstitutionality of the legislative veto
Oregon v. Bradshaw	462 U.S. 1039 (1983)	Protections of Miranda v. Arizona when the suspect reinitiates conversation with the police
Bolger v. Youngs Drug Products Corp.	463 U.S. 60 (1983)	First Amendment, definition of commercial speech
Solem v. Helm	463 U.S. 277 (1983)	Life without parole for passing bad checks is cruel and unusual punishment
Jones v. United States	463 U.S. 354 (1983)	Verdict of not guilty by reason of insanity is sufficiently probative of mental illness and dangerousness to justify involuntary commitment
United States v. Sells Engineering, Inc.	463 U.S. 418 (1983)	Civil Division attorneys can obtain disclosure only by showing particularized need
Dirks v. Securities & Exchange Commission	463 U.S. 646 (1983)	Insider trading, interpretation of Rule 10b-5 of the Securities Exchange Act of 1934
Marsh v. Chambers	463 U.S. 783 (1983)	Establishment Clause does not forbid state legislatures from employing chaplains
Barefoot v. Estelle	463 U.S. 880 (1983)	Admissibility of psychiatrist's testimony about a criminal's future dangerousness
Michigan v. Long	463 U.S. 1032 (1983)	"Adequate and independent state ground"
Russello v. United States	464 U.S. 16 (1983)	Racketeer Influenced and Corrupt Organizations Act
Sony Corp. v. Universal City Studios (Betamax case)	464 U.S. 417 (1984)	Copyright, VCR "time-shifting", fair use
Southland Corp. v. Keating	465 U.S. 1 (1984)	Federal Arbitration Act applies to actions in state courts
McKaskle v. Wiggins	465 U.S. 168 (1984)	Standby counsel does not violate criminal defendant's Sixth Amendment right to present his own case in a criminal trial
Grove City College v. Bell	465 U.S. 555 (1984)	Acquiescence to federal anti-discrimination regulations through acceptance of federal funds
Lynch v. Donnelly	465 U.S. 668 (1984)	Public religious display on private property
Calder v. Jones	465 U.S. 783 (1984)	Minimum contacts for personal jurisdiction based on a libelous publication
United Building & Construction Trades Council v. Mayor and Council of Camden	465 U.S. 208 (1984)	Privileges and Immunities clause
Oliver v. United States	466 U.S. 170 (1984)	Reaffirmed open fields doctrine in a case where the defendant grew marijuana in his field
Immigration and Naturalization Service v. Delgado	466 U.S. 210 (1984)	Fourth Amendment requirements for administrative searches
Helicopteros Nacionales de Colombia, S. A. v. Hall	466 U.S. 408 (1984)	Purchases in the United States by a non-resident corporation are insufficient under the minimum contacts test to establish in personam jurisdiction
Bose Corp. v. Consumers Union of United States, Inc.	466 U.S. 485 (1984)	Appellate courts may make finding of "actual malice" required for libel claims against public figures by the First Amendment
Strickland v. Washington	466 U.S. 668 (1984)	Standard for ineffective assistance of counsel under the Sixth Amendment
Members of the City Council of the City of Los Angeles v. Taxpayers for Vincent	466 U.S. 789 (1984)	First Amendment regulation of posting of campaign signs
Waller v. Georgia	467 U.S. 39 (1984)	Sixth Amendment right to a public trial
South-Central Timber Development, Inc. v. Wunnicke	467 U.S. 82 (1984)	Market participant exception to the Dormant Commerce Clause
United States v. Gouveia	467 U.S. 180 (1984)	Right to counsel for prisoners under administrative segregation
Bernal v. Fainter	467 U.S. 216 (1984)	Citizenship of notaries public
Hawaii Housing Authority v. Midkiff	467 U.S. 229 (1984)	Land use law, takings to redistribute private property
Immigration and Naturalization Service v. Stevic	467 U.S. 407 (1984)	Aliens must establish a clear probability of persecution to avoid deportation
Nix v. Williams	467 U.S. 431 (1984)	Inevitable discovery exception to exclusionary rule
California v. Trombetta	467 U.S. 479 (1984)	Preservation of breath samples in DUI cases not required under the Due Process Clause
New York v. Quarles	467 U.S. 649 (1984)	Miranda rights
Chevron U.S.A. v. Natural Resources Defense Council	467 U.S. 837 (1984)	Judicial review of the interpretation of statutes by government agencies
Clark v. C.C.N.V.	468 U.S. 288 (1984)	Right to sleep in public parks
FCC v. League of Women Voters of California	468 U.S. 364 (1984)	Revert regulation on "editorializing" by government funded broadcasters
Brown v. Hotel and Restaurant Employees	468 U.S. 491 (1984)	New Jersey Casino Control Act was not preempted by the National Labor Relations Act
Hudson v. Palmer	468 U.S. 517 (1984)	Prison inmates have no reasonable expectation of privacy in their cells under the Fourth Amendment, and destruction of property did not constitute a Due Process violation under the Fifth and Fourteenth Amendments because Virginia had adequate state law remedies.
Roberts v. United States Jaycees	468 U.S. 609 (1984)	First Amendment freedom of association and excluding women as members of a private club
Regan v. Time, Inc.	468 U.S. 641 (1984)	Artistic depictions of United States currency
Allen v. Wright	468 U.S. 737 (1984)	Standing to sue for executive action alleged to promote racial discrimination by third parties
United States v. Leon	468 U.S. 897 (1984)	Search and seizure, "good faith" exception to exclusionary rule
Mills Music, Inc v. Snyder	469 U.S. 153 (1985)	Assignment of royalties under the Copyright Act
New Jersey v. T. L. O.	469 U.S. 325 (1985)	Search and seizure at a public high school
Evitts v. Lucey	469 U.S. 387 (1985)	Effective assistance of counsel in appeals in criminal cases
Wainwright v. Witt	469 U.S. 412 (1985)	Selection of jurors in death penalty cases
United States v. Maine	469 U.S. 504 (1985)	Long Island is an extension of the mainland and the bordering sounds are therefore under state regulatory control
Garcia v. San Antonio Metropolitan Transit Authority	469 U.S. 528 (1985)	Application of minimum wage laws to state governments
Ake v. Oklahoma	470 U.S. 68 (1985)	Right of the accused asserting insanity to a state-appointed psychiatrist
Dean Witter Reynolds Inc. v. Byrd	470 U.S. 213 (1985)	Arbitration clauses must be enforced even if bifurcated and inefficient proceedings result
Supreme Court of New Hampshire v. Piper	470 U.S. 274 (1985)	Residency requirements for membership in the state bar
Oregon v. Elstad	470 U.S. 298 (1985)	Applying the exclusionary rule to violations of the Miranda rights
Cleveland Board of Education v. Loudermill	470 U.S. 532 (1985)	Due process right of public employees to be heard before termination
Winston v. Lee	470 U.S. 753 (1985)	Compelled surgical intrusion into an individual's body for evidence violates suspect's Fourth Amendment rights
Heckler v. Chaney	470 U.S. 821 (1985)	Forcing the Food and Drug Administration to determine whether it is legal to use certain drugs for lethal injection
Metropolitan Life Insurance Co. v. Ward	470 U.S. 869 (1985)	State tax policy favoring domestic insurers unconstitutional
Tennessee v. Garner	471 U.S. 1 (1985)	Restriction on the use of deadly force as part of the Fleeing felon rule.
Board of Trustees of Scarsdale v. McCreary	471 U.S. 83 (1985)	Establishment of religion issue by displaying a nativity scene on public land
Central Intelligence Agency v. Sims	471 U.S. 159 (1985)	Whether scientific researchers used by the CIA in Project MKUltra are intelligence sources, and their names exempt from disclosure under the Freedom of Information Act.
Burger King v. Rudzewicz	471 U.S. 462 (1985)	Personal jurisdiction, "purposeful availment"
Harper & Row v. Nation Enterprises	471 U.S. 539 (1985)	Fair use of copyrighted material
Landreth Timber Co. v. Landreth	471 U.S. 681 (1985)	Securities Act of 1933 and the "sale of business" doctrine
Wallace v. Jaffree	472 U.S. 38 (1985)	School sponsorship of voluntary religious observances
Superintendent, Mass. Correctional Institute at Walpole v. Hill	472 U.S. 445 (1985)	Prison disciplinary decisions to revoke good-time credits must be supported by "some evidence"
McDonald v. Smith	472 U.S. 479 (1985)	Petition Clause of First Amendment does not provide absolute immunity to charges of defamation
Brockett v. Spokane Arcades, Inc.	472 U.S. 491 (1985)	Regulation of adult bookstores
Mitchell v. Forsyth	472 U.S. 511 (1985)	Civil liability for conducting warrantless wiretaps
Aspen Skiing Co. v. Aspen Highlands Skiing Corp.	472 U.S. 585 (1985)	Antitrust and alteration of marketing cooperation agreement
Thornton v. Caldor	472 U.S. 703 (1985)	Constitutionality of Sabbath laws
Dun & Bradstreet, Inc. v. Greenmoss Builders, Inc.	472 U.S. 749 (1985)	First Amendment, libel in credit reporting
Dowling v. United States	473 U.S. 207 (1985)	Copyright infringement as theft
Aguilar v. Felton	473 U.S. 402 (1985)	Using federal funds to pay teachers in parochial schools under the Establishment Clause
City of Cleburne v. Cleburne Living Center, Inc.	473 U.S. 432 (1985)	Equal protection for the mentally disabled
United States v. Montoya de Hernandez	473 U.S. 531 (1985)	Constitutionality of body cavity searches at the border under the Fourth Amendment
Thomas v. Union Carbide Agricultural Products Co.	473 U.S. 568 (1985)	Article III and the arbitration provisions of FIFRA
Mitsubishi Motors Corp. v. Soler Chrysler-Plymouth, Inc.	473 U.S. 614 (1985)	Private antitrust claims under Sherman Act are arbitrable, even before foreign panel
United States v. Bagley	473 U.S. 667 (1985)	Prosecutors must disclose information useful for impeaching government witnesses under Brady v. Maryland
Heath v. Alabama	474 U.S. 82 (1985)	Double jeopardy clause of the Fifth Amendment does not prevent one state from trying and punishing someone for an act for which he has already been convicted and sentenced by another state
Witters v. Washington Department of Services For the Blind	474 U.S. 481 (1985)	Constitutionality of public aid paid directly to students of Christian colleges
Vasquez v. Hillery	474 U.S. 254 (1986)	Race discrimination in selecting grand juries
Cabana v. Bullock	474 U.S. 376 (1986)	Appellate courts may make the finding required by Enmund v. Florida in the first instance
Nix v. Whiteside	475 U.S. 157 (1986)	Presentation of perjured testimony at a criminal trial; Sixth Amendment right to counsel
Fisher v. City of Berkeley	475 U.S. 260 (1986)	Rent control ordinances and the Sherman Antitrust Act
Goldman v. Weinberger	475 U.S. 503 (1986)	Religious headwear for military personnel under the Establishment Clause
Michigan v. Jackson	475 U.S. 625 (1986)	Suspect confessions and the Sixth Amendment right to counsel
Philadelphia Newspapers, Inc. v. Hepps	475 U.S. 767 (1986)	First Amendment constraints on libel actions; private-figure plaintiffs must show falsity of statements
Batson v. Kentucky	476 U.S. 79 (1986)	Peremptory challenge, racial discrimination
Poland v. Arizona	476 U.S. 147 (1986)	Reimposing the death penalty after the underlying murder conviction has been vacated
California v. Ciraolo	476 U.S. 206 (1986)	Naked-eye aerial observation of defendant's backyard by police does not violate the Fourth Amendment
Dow Chemical Co. v. United States	476 U.S. 227 (1986)	Aerial photography of industrial facilities by the EPA does not violate Fourth Amendment—decided same day as Ciraolo
Brown-Forman Distillers Corp. v. New York State Liquor Authority	476 U.S. 573 (1986)	Price controls on alcoholic beverages and the Commerce Clause
Bowen v. Roy	476 U.S. 693 (1986)	Freedom of religion and Social Security numbers
Thornburgh v. American College of Obstetricians and Gynecologists	476 U.S. 747 (1986)	Requiring "informed consent" before an abortion
Meritor Savings Bank v. Vinson	477 U.S. 57 (1986)	"Hostile work environment" as sexual harassment
McMillan v. Pennsylvania	477 U.S. 79 (1986)	Mandatory minimum sentences are not elements of crimes subject to proof beyond a reasonable doubt
Maine v. Taylor	477 U.S. 131 (1986)	Exception to Dormant Commerce Clause
Anderson v. Liberty Lobby	477 U.S. 242 (1986)	Standard for summary judgment
Celotex Corp. v. Catrett	477 U.S. 317 (1986)	Standard for summary judgment
Ford v. Wainwright	477 U.S. 399 (1986)	Competence to be executed
Press-Enterprise Co. v. Superior Court	478 U.S. 1 (1986)	First Amendment free press guarantee and the right to a transcript of a preliminary hearing
Bowers v. Hardwick	478 U.S. 186 (1986)	Sodomy and substantive due process; overruled by Lawrence v. Texas (2003)
Posadas de Puerto Rico Associates v. Tourism Company of Puerto Rico	478 U.S. 328 (1986)	Central Hudson test and First Amendment commercial speech
Allen v. Illinois	478 U.S. 364 (1986)	Statements made in civil commitment proceedings for sex offenders are not subject to the Fifth Amendment privilege against self-incrimination
Bethel School District v. Fraser	478 U.S. 675 (1986)	Censorship of obscene speech at a school assembly
Bowsher v. Synar	478 U.S. 714 (1986)	Gramm–Rudman–Hollings Balanced Budget Act, office of Comptroller General, separation of powers
Merrell Dow Pharmaceuticals Inc. v. Thompson	478 U.S. 804 (1986)	Federal courts cannot claim original jurisdiction for violation of a statute which does not provide a private cause of action
Commodity Futures Trading Commission v. Schor	478 U.S. 833 (1986)	Jurisdiction of Article I and Article III tribunals, waiver of Article III jurisdiction
