= Perry Education Association v. Perry Local Educators' Association =

- Supreme Court of the United States

Argued October 13, 1982 Decided February 23, 1983
- Full case name: Perry Education Association v. Perry Local Educators' Association
- Citations: 460 U.S. 37 (more) 103 S. Ct. 948; 74 L. Ed. 2d 794

Case history
- Prior: Perry Local Educators' Ass'n v. Hohlt, 652 F.2d 1286 (7th Cir. 1981)
- Subsequent: On remand, Perry Local Educators' Ass'n v. Hohlt, 705 F.2d 462 (7th Cir. 1983)

Holding
- The First Amendment is not violated by the preferential access to the interschool mail system granted to a teachers' union but not other employee organizations.

Court membership
- Chief Justice Warren E. Burger Associate Justices William J. Brennan Jr. · Byron White; Thurgood Marshall · Harry Blackmun; Lewis F. Powell Jr. · William Rehnquist; John P. Stevens · Sandra Day O'Connor

Case opinions
- Majority: White, joined by Burger, Blackmun, Rehnquist, and O'Connor
- Dissent: Brennan, joined by Marshall, Powell, Stevens

Laws applied
- U.S. Const. Amend. I

Perry Education Association v. Perry Local Educators' Association, 460 U.S. 37 (1983), was a United States Supreme Court decision concerning free speech rights on government-owned property. The Court ruled that teacher mailboxes and the use of a school mail delivery system are a nonpublic forum, and upheld a policy that allowed the union representing the teachers, but not other employee organizations, to use the district's mail system.

Perry Education Association is commonly cited for its explanation of the rules distinguishing the public forum, the designated public forum, and the nonpublic forum.

== Background ==
Two rival unions were in competition to represent the teachers of Perry Township Schools in Indiana: the Perry Education Association (PEA) and the Perry Local Educators' Association (PLEA). In 1977, PEA won an election and was certified as the exclusive bargaining representative for the district's teachers.

Following the election, PEA negotiated a labor contract with the district. Among other things, this contract gave PEA the right to place material in teachers' mailboxes and to use the interschool mail delivery system. Mail access rights were given exclusively to PEA, and could not be used by any other "school employee organization."

PLEA, the rival organization, could not use teacher mailboxes or the school mail system. However, PLEA was not prevented from posting notices on bulletin boards, holding meetings on school property, or making announcements on the public address system. In addition, under Indiana law, PLEA was assured of equal access to all modes of communication during election periods.

PLEA filed a civil suit against PEA under §1983, claiming that the mail access policy violated PLEA's First Amendment rights. The Seventh Circuit sided with PLEA, ruling that there was no basis for denying PLEA mail access.

== Opinion of the Court ==
In a 5–4 decision, the Supreme Court reversed the Seventh Circuit and upheld the mail access policy.

Justice Byron White's majority opinion, joined by Justices Warren E. Burger, Harry Blackmun, William Rehnquist, and Sandra Day O'Connor, analyzed the three types of forum that arise when speakers use government-owned property to convey a message:

- A public forum is a public place, such as a street or park, that "time out of mind, [has] been used" for expressive purposes. In the traditional public forum, speech restrictions must be content-neutral, be narrowly tailored to serve a significant government interest, and leave open ample alternative channels of communication.
- A designated public forum is "public property which the State has opened for use by the public as a place for expressive activity." Although the government is not required to open or maintain a designated public forum, as long as such a forum exists the government is "bound by the same standards as apply in a traditional public forum."
- Finally, a nonpublic forum is not open to the public for expressive purposes, although speakers may gain access by the government's invitation or permission. In a nonpublic forum, government may not discriminate according to viewpoint, but it may "draw distinctions which relate to the special purpose for which the property is used."

White concluded that the school mail system was a nonpublic forum. Although other organizations such as the Cub Scouts and the YMCA were at times permitted to use the mail facilities, this was done with the permission of the building principal. He stated that this "selective access does not transform government property into a public forum."

Next, White ruled that PEA's preferential access was a reasonable distinction based on status, not viewpoint. He argued that distinctions based on "subject matter and speaker identity" are "inescapable in the process of limiting a nonpublic forum to activities compatible with the intended purpose of the property." He also stated that there was no evidence that PEA's favorable treatment was a consequence of different viewpoints on labor or any other issue, but that the unequal treatment simply reflected PEA's "special responsibilities" as the exclusive bargaining agent for teachers.

White also found that the restriction was reasonable because "substantial alternative channels ... remain[ed] open" for PLEA to communicate with teachers. These channels included bulletin boards, United States mail, and the use of school mail facilities during election periods.

Justice William Brennan's dissenting opinion, joined by Justices Thurgood Marshall, Lewis F. Powell Jr., and John Paul Stevens, argued that the mail policy was a form of viewpoint discrimination and noted that viewpoint discrimination is impermissible even in a nonpublic forum.

== See also ==
- List of United States Supreme Court cases
- List of United States Supreme Court cases, volume 460
