= Friedman v. Rogers =

Friedman et al. v. Rogers et al.
- Supreme Court of the United States

Argued November 8, 1978 Decided February 21, 1979
- Full case name: Dr. N. Jay ROGERS, Plaintiff, W. J. Dickinson, Individually and as President of the Texas Senior Citizens Association, Port Arthur, Texas Chapter, Intervenor, v. Dr. E. Richard FRIEDMAN, Dr. John B. Bowen, Dr. Hugh A. Sticksel, Jr., Dr. John W. Davis, Dr. Sal Mora, Defendants, Texas Optometric Association, Inc., Intervenor.
- Docket no.: 77-1163
- Citations: 440 U.S. 1 (more)
- Argument: Oral argument
- Opinion announcement: Opinion announcement

Case history
- Prior: 438 F. Supp. 428

Holding
- A Texas law prohibiting the use of a trade name within the practice of optometry and which requires that members of the State optometry board be members of a professional optometry organization is constitutional.

Court membership
- Chief Justice Warren E. Burger Associate Justices William J. Brennan Jr. · Potter Stewart; Byron White · Thurgood Marshall; Harry Blackmun · Lewis F. Powell Jr. William Rehnquist · John P. Stevens

Case opinions
- Majority: Powell, joined by Burger, Brennan, Stewart, White, Rehnquist, Stevens, Marshall, Blackmun
- Concur/dissent: Blackmun, joined by Marshall

Laws applied
- I Amendment, X Amendment

Friedman et al. v. Rogers et al., 440 U.S. 1 (1979) was a Supreme Court case in which the Court held that a Texas law, the Texas Optometry Act, which prohibited optometrists from using trade names for commercial purposes and which requires that 4/6 of the members of the Texas Optometry Board be members of the Texas Optometric Association is constitutional. In its decision the Supreme Court overruled the United States District Court for the Eastern District of Texas's ruling in that prohibition against trade name was an unnecessary and unjustified stifling of First Amendment Commercial speech. The decision further upheld a State's Tenth Amendment right to control and regulate their professional licensing boards and organizations.

== Historical Context ==
Throughout many industries and professional practices within the United States, there is a divide between those who consider themselves "true professionals" and those who are "commercial professionals". "True professionals" are against the use of commercial advertising or promotion, and "commercial professionals" are those who are for advertising.

Dr. N. Jay. Rogers was a licensed optometrist in the State of Texas, and board member of the Texas Optometric Association, who was a staunch supporter of "commercial professionals", and was actually the lead spokesman for an organization of over 100 other commercial Optometric offices under the trade name of Texas State Optical. Rogers' complaint arose both the fact the Texas Optometry Act required 4/6 of the board members to be part of the Texas Optometric Association, which Rogers couldn't join due to his commercial affiliations, and that it prohibited the practice of optometry under a trade name

=== Lower Court ===
Rogers filed suit with the U.S. District Court for the Eastern District of Texas, Beaumont Division. He filed suit against the rest of the board members, collectively represented by Dr. Richard Friedman, specifically he sued the Board to receive declaratory and injunctive relief from the enforcement of the specific parts of the statute at issue. The case was heard by an en banc panel of District Court Chief Judge Joseph Fisher, District Court Judge William Steger, and Fifth Circuit Judge Irving Goldberg presiding. In its memorandum opinion, the Court affirmed the part of the statute which required board members to be a part of the Texas Optometric Association, however it did side with Rogers in that the prohibition of using trade names was a violation of proper commercial speech protected by the First Amendment. saying,

"...even if a trade name is not an integral part of advertising per se, there is a first amendment right to the use of a trade name as part of the consuming public's right to valuable information."

The District Court therefore struck down the specific section prohibiting trade names, and Friedman appealed to the Supreme Court.

== Supreme Court Decision ==
On November 8, 1978, the Supreme Court held oral arguments and its ruling was announced on February 21, 1979. In a unanimous decision the Court ruled in favor of Friedman, thereby affirming and reversing in part the District Court's decision, which ultimately meant Friedman had prevailed in the entire case. Although it was a unanimous decision in favor of Friedman, Justice Harry Blackmun, joined by Justice Thurgood Marshall, filed an opinion concurring in part and dissenting in part.

=== Majority Opinion ===
Justice Lewis Powell Jr. wrote the majority opinion, which was joined by every other Justice but those who dissented. The opinion reviewed the District Court's interpretation of two prior cases, those being Bates v. State Bar of Arizona, 433 U.S. 350 (1977), and Virginia State Pharmacy Board v. Virginia Citizens Consumer Council, 425 U. S. 748 (1976). In examining the District Court's decision, the Court concluded that the District Court had interpreted the cases wrongfully, stating,

"Here, we are concerned with a form of commercial speech that has no intrinsic meaning. A trade name conveys no information about the price and nature of the services offered by an optometrist until it acquires meaning over a period of time by associations formed in the minds of the public between the name and some standard of price or quality. Because these ill-defined associations of trade names with price and quality information can be manipulated by the users of trade names, there is a significant possibility that trade names will be used to mislead the public" (footnote omitted)

The Court found that although the use of trade names was commercial speech for its use in advertising, it found that,

"the State's interest in protecting the public from the deceptive and misleading use of optometrical trade names is substantial and..[w]e are convinced that § 5.13(d) is a constitutionally permissible state regulation in furtherance of this interest."

It is's decision the Court did not emphasize the rule requiring membership in the Texas Optometrics Association very often, and really only mentioned it to affirm the District Court's decision on that part.

=== Justice Blackmun's Concurrence/Dissent ===
Justice Blackmun's Concurrence/Dissent opinion, joined by Justice Marshall, agreed with the majority in upholding the requirement of membership in the TOA, however it dissented in the bigger trade name issue. His argument is summed up by his stating that,

"This inescapable conclusion is one of profound importance in the measure of the First Amendment rights that are asserted here. It follows, it seems to me, that Texas has abridged the First Amendment rights not only of Doctor Rogers, but also of the members of the intervenor plaintiff Texas Senior Citizens Association by absolutely prohibiting, without reasonable justification, the dissemination of truthful information about wholly legal commercial conduct."

Justice Blackmun's opinion in essence said the majority was over exaggerating any potential "deception" caused by the use of trade names, and that the Court had essentially silenced the lawful dissemination of information and advertising.
