= Schlesinger v. Ballard =

- Supreme Court of the United States

Argued October 15, 1974 Decided January 15, 1975
- Full case name: James R. Schlesinger, Secretary of Defense, et al. v. Ballard
- Citations: 419 U.S. 498 (more) 95 S. Ct. 572; 42 L. Ed. 2d 610; 1975 U.S. LEXIS 22; 9 Fair Empl. Prac. Cas. (BNA) 33; 9 Empl. Prac. Dec. (CCH) ¶ 9894

Case history
- Prior: Appeal from the United States District Court for the Southern District of California

Holding
- The Court upheld a federal statute that granted female Naval officers four more years of commissioned service before mandatory discharge than male Naval officers.

Court membership
- Chief Justice Warren E. Burger Associate Justices William O. Douglas · William J. Brennan Jr. Potter Stewart · Byron White; Thurgood Marshall · Harry Blackmun; Lewis F. Powell Jr. · William Rehnquist

Case opinions
- Majority: Stewart, joined by Burger, Blackmun, Powell, Rehnquist
- Dissent: Brennan, joined by Douglas, Marshall
- Dissent: White

Laws applied
- U.S. Const. amend. V

Schlesinger v. Ballard, 419 U.S. 498 (1975), was a United States Supreme Court case that upheld a federal statute granting female Naval officers four more years of commissioned service before mandatory discharge than male Naval officers. A group of naval officers who were discharged prior to their tenth year of commissioned service, as a result of not being promoted, received a lower rate of separation pay than female officers who were permitted to remain in service longer and receive three additional promotion board opportunities. As a result, the female officers who failed to be promoted received a higher rate of separation pay over their male counterparts. Ballard, a male officer who was passed over earned $15,000 in separation pay, but if he had been a similarly situated female officer, he argued that he would have received over $200,000 in separation pay. Ballard had also served as an enlisted sailor, but his eighteen years of total service was not enough to earn a military retirement. Although Justice Harry Blackmun's clerk pointed this out in a memorandum, Blackmun responded "We are first of all, dealing with the military and not with some civilian set-up, and I suppose this adds a protective factor to the government's position."

== Decision ==
A federal statute granted female Naval officers thirteen years of commissioned service while allowing only nine years of commissioned service for male Naval officers before mandatory discharge. The Supreme Court held that the law passed intermediate scrutiny equal protection analysis because women, excluded from combat duty, had fewer opportunities for advancement in the military. The Court found the statute to directly compensate for the past statutory barriers to advancement did violate the Constitution. The Court' approach to the appeal was, unlike Frontiero v. Richardson, part of a line of appeals in which it displayed deference to the military.
