= American Party of Texas v. White =

- Supreme Court of the United States

Decided March 26, 1974
- Full case name: American Party of Texas v. White
- Citations: 415 U.S. 767 (more)

Holding
- It is unconstitutional to exclude minority party candidates from absentee ballots that include the major-party candidates.

Court membership
- Chief Justice Warren E. Burger Associate Justices William O. Douglas · William J. Brennan Jr. Potter Stewart · Byron White; Thurgood Marshall · Harry Blackmun; Lewis F. Powell Jr. · William Rehnquist

Case opinions
- Majority: White
- Dissent: Douglas (in part)

American Party of Texas v. White, 415 U.S. 767 (1974), was a United States Supreme Court case in which the Court held that it is unconstitutional to exclude minority party candidates from absentee ballots that include the major-party candidates.
