= Michigan v. Mosley =

- Supreme Court of the United States

Argued October 6, 1975 Decided December 9, 1975
- Full case name: Michigan v. Richard Bert Mosley
- Citations: 423 U.S. 96 (more) 96 S. Ct. 321; 46 L. Ed. 2d 313; 1975 U.S. LEXIS 100

Holding
- The admission in evidence of Mosley's incriminating statement did not violate Miranda principles.

Court membership
- Chief Justice Warren E. Burger Associate Justices William J. Brennan Jr. · Potter Stewart; Byron White · Thurgood Marshall; Harry Blackmun · Lewis F. Powell Jr. William Rehnquist

Case opinions
- Majority: Stewart, joined by Burger, Blackmun, Powell, Rehnquist
- Concurrence: White
- Dissent: Brennan, joined by Marshall
- Douglas took no part in the consideration or decision of the case.

Michigan v. Mosley, 423 U.S. 96 (1975), was a United States Supreme Court case in which the Court held that a criminal suspect's assertion of his right to remain silent after a Miranda warning does not preclude the police from re-Mirandizing him and questioning him about a different crime.

== Background ==
On April 8, 1971, Richard Bert Mosley was arrested in Michigan in connection with several robberies. Police Mirandized him and asked him questions about the robberies. He eventually asserted his right to remain silent and interrogation ceased. More than two hours later, while Mosley was still being held, another officer interrogated him regarding a homicide. The officer read Mosley a fresh Miranda warning and Mosley then made statements that incriminated him.

The incriminating statement was introduced in evidence against Mosley at trial. He was convicted of first-degree murder and sentenced to life imprisonment. On appeal to the Michigan Court of Appeals, Mosley objected to the use of his incriminating statement as evidence. The appellate court reversed and remanded the case for a new trial, holding that the second officer's interrogation of Mosley was a violation of the Miranda principles.

The State of Michigan appealed. The Supreme Court granted certiorari on January 20, 1975.

== Opinion of the Court ==
In a majority opinion delivered by Justice Stewart on December 9, 1975, the Supreme Court sided with Michigan and remanded the case. The Court held that the questioning on a different crime did not violate Mosley's right to remain silent. The Court reasoned that his Fifth Amendment rights were scrupulously honored when he ended questioning about the robberies. Given the significant time lapse and the fresh set of Miranda warnings, there was no violation of Mosley's Fifth Amendment rights.

Justice White wrote a concurrence, stating that the Court should “adopt voluntariness as the standard.” Justice Brennan and Justice Marshall dissented, arguing once an individual invokes his Fifth Amendment privilege, any statement taken after that “cannot be other than the product of compulsion, subtle or otherwise.”

== See also ==
- United States constitutional criminal procedure
- Criminal justice
- Criminal procedure
- Miranda v. Arizona
- Right to silence
- Self-incrimination
