= McDonough Power Equipment, Inc. v. Greenwood =

McDonough Power Equipment v. Greenwood
- Supreme Court of the United States

Argued November 28, 1983 Decided January 18, 1984
- Full case name: McDonough Power Equipment, Inc. v. Greenwood, et al.
- Citations: 464 U.S. 548 (more) 104 S. Ct. 845; 78 L. Ed. 2d 663

Case history
- Prior: Greenwood et al. v. McDonough Power Equipment, Inc., 687 F.2d 338 (10th Cir. 1982).

Holding
- A juror's failure to respond to question on voir dire did not require new trial absent a showing of denial of right to impartial jury.

Court membership
- Chief Justice Warren E. Burger Associate Justices William J. Brennan Jr. · Byron White; Thurgood Marshall · Harry Blackmun; Lewis F. Powell Jr. · William Rehnquist; John P. Stevens · Sandra Day O'Connor

Case opinions
- Majority: Rehnquist, joined by Burger, White, Blackmun, Powell, Stevens, O'Connor
- Concurrence: Blackmun, joined by Stevens, O'Connor
- Concurrence: Brennan, joined by Marshall

Laws applied
- Rule 61 of the Federal Rules of Civil Procedure, 28 U.S.C. § 2111

McDonough Power Equipment, Inc. v. Greenwood, 464 U.S. 548 (1984), was a case decided by the Supreme Court of the United States that established a standard for challenging a verdict based on inaccurate answers given by prospective jurors during voir dire.

== Background ==
Bill Greenwood was a juvenile in Kansas whose feet were severed on a riding lawnmower manufactured by McDonough. Before the three-week trial, one of the jurors failed to disclose that her son had sustained a broken leg as a result of an exploding tire. Although McDonough would likely have used a peremptory challenge if they had known the background, there was no direct conflict of interest and the rest of the jurors quickly ruled against the manufacturer in deliberations.

== Decision ==
The standard adopted by the Court in McDonough was that a verdict could be challenged because of inaccurate answers given during voir dire only if the juror failed to honestly answer a question and an honest answer would have provided a valid basis to challenge for cause.

== See also ==
- List of United States Supreme Court cases, volume 464
