= Aronson v. Quick Point Pencil Co. =

- Supreme Court of the United States

Decided February 28, 1979
- Full case name: Aronson v. Quick Point Pencil Co.
- Citations: 440 U.S. 257 (more)

Holding
- Federal patent law does not preempt state contract law so as to preclude enforcement of the contract.

Court membership
- Chief Justice Warren E. Burger Associate Justices William J. Brennan Jr. · Potter Stewart; Byron White · Thurgood Marshall; Harry Blackmun · Lewis F. Powell Jr. William Rehnquist · John P. Stevens

Aronson v. Quick Point Pencil Co., 440 U.S. 257 (1979), was a United States Supreme Court case in which the court held that federal patent law does not preempt state contract law so as to preclude enforcement of the contract.

== Description ==
The challenged law required the licensee of a patent-pending invention to pay a royalty to the inventor even if the patent was ultimately denied. The Supreme Court upheld the law because it did not cause anyone to decline to seek a patent or try to hide their disclosed inventions after the fact.
