= Orr v. Orr =

- Supreme Court of the United States

Argued November 27, 1978 Decided March 5, 1979
- Full case name: William Orr v. Lillian Orr
- Citations: 440 U.S. 268 (more) 99 S. Ct. 1102; 59 L. Ed. 2d 306; 1979 U.S. LEXIS 65

Holding
- The Alabama statute granting alimony only to women violated the Equal Protection Clause of the Fourteenth Amendment.

Court membership
- Chief Justice Warren E. Burger Associate Justices William J. Brennan Jr. · Potter Stewart; Byron White · Thurgood Marshall; Harry Blackmun · Lewis F. Powell Jr. William Rehnquist · John P. Stevens

Case opinions
- Majority: Brennan, joined by Stewart, White, Marshall, Blackmun, Stevens
- Concurrence: Blackmun
- Concurrence: Stevens
- Dissent: Powell
- Dissent: Rehnquist, joined by Burger

Laws applied
- U.S. Const. amend. XIV

Orr v. Orr, 440 U.S. 268 (1979), was a United States Supreme Court case on appeal from the Court of Civil Appeals of Alabama. The judgment in the case held that Alabama statutes that imposed alimony obligations on husbands but not on wives violated the equal protection clause of the Fourteenth Amendment.

== Background ==
The state of Alabama had statutes that imposed alimony obligations on husbands but not on wives. The relevant statutes read, in part:

If the wife has no separate estate or if it be insufficient for her maintenance, the judge, upon granting a divorce, at his discretion, may order to the wife an allowance out of the estate of the husband, taking into consideration the value thereof and the condition of his family."

Alabama Code, Title 30, § 30-2-51 (1975)

The stated purpose was to address the economic disparity between men and women by providing support for needy women after divorce.

Ruth Bader Ginsburg and Margaret Moses Young filed a brief for the American Civil Liberties Union as amicus curiae urging reversal.

== Facts ==
In February 1974, a final decree of divorce dissolved the marriage of William and Lillian Orr, directing Mr. Orr to pay $1,240 per month to Lillian. In July 1976, initiated contempt proceedings in the Circuit Court of Lee County, Alabama, alleging that Mr. Orr was in arrears in his alimony payments.

Mr. Orr filed a motion of defense requesting that Alabama's alimony statute be declared unconstitutional as it places an obligation only upon husbands and not upon wives.

== Judgment ==
The Court found that, because the Alabama statute provided for different treatment to individuals on the basis of sex; it was thus “subject to scrutiny under the Equal Protection Clause.” “To withstand scrutiny under the Equal Protection Clause, classifications by gender must serve important governmental objectives, and must be substantially related to achievement of those objectives.” Applying intermediate scrutiny, the Court determined that the statute was not substantially related to the stated purpose. The Court observed that a gender-neutral statute would still have the effect of providing for needy women. The Court further observed that the only difference created by the Alabama statute was to also provide support for well off women that did not need support, and to exclude needy men from support.

== Dissent ==
The opinion had three dissenting votes, from Justices Powell, Rehnquist, and Burger. Powell wrote that the U.S. Supreme Court should abstain from addressing the constitutional questions, stating there were unsettled issues of state law that the Alabama Supreme Court should address before the U.S. Supreme Court weighs in.

Justice Rehnquist's dissenting opinion was based on the fact that the applicant had been “a divorcee male who has never sought alimony, who is demonstrably not entitled to alimony even if he had, and who contractually bound himself to pay alimony to his former wife and did so without objection for over two years.” Concluding that he did not meet the "threshold determinants of the propriety of judicial intervention".
