= Metropolitan Edison Co. v. NLRB =

- Supreme Court of the United States

Decided April 4, 1983
- Full case name: Metropolitan Edison Co. v. NLRB
- Citations: 460 U.S. 693 (more)

Holding
- When punishing an employee for engaging in an unprotected strike, an employer may not consider their status as a union official when deciding the degree of discipline to inflict but may consider their role in the actual strike.

Court membership
- Chief Justice Warren E. Burger Associate Justices William J. Brennan Jr. · Byron White; Thurgood Marshall · Harry Blackmun; Lewis F. Powell Jr. · William Rehnquist; John P. Stevens · Sandra Day O'Connor

Case opinion
- Majority: Powell, joined by unanimous

Laws applied
- National Labor Relations Act

Metropolitan Edison Co. v. NLRB, 460 U.S. 693 (1983), was a United States Supreme Court case in which the court held that, when punishing an employee for engaging in an unprotected strike, an employer may not consider their status as a union official when deciding the degree of discipline to inflict but may consider their role in the actual strike.
