= Thermtron Products, Inc. v. Hermansdorfer =

- Supreme Court of the United States

Argued October 7, 1975 Decided January 20, 1976
- Full case name: Thermtron Products, Inc. and Larry Dean Newhard, Petitioners, v. H. David Hermansdorfer, Judge, United States District Court for the Eastern District of Kentucky, Respondent
- Docket no.: 74-206
- Citations: 423 U.S. 336 (more) 96 S. Ct. 584; 46 L. Ed. 2d 542
- Argument: Oral argument
- Reargument: Reargument
- Opinion announcement: Opinion announcement

Holding
- A U.S. District Court may not refuse to exercise its statutory removal jurisdiction and remand a case to state court based simply on the press of other business, and its doing so is reviewable by writ of mandamus

Court membership
- Chief Justice Warren E. Burger Associate Justices William J. Brennan Jr. · Potter Stewart; Byron White · Thurgood Marshall; Harry Blackmun · Lewis F. Powell Jr. William Rehnquist · John P. Stevens

Case opinions
- Majority: White, joined by Brennan, Marshall, Blackmun, Powell
- Dissent: Rehnquist, joined by Burger, Stewart
- Stevens took no part in the consideration or decision of the case.

Laws applied
- 28 U.S.C. §§ 1441, 1446, 1447

Thermtron Products, Inc. v. Hermansdorfer, 423 U.S. 336 (1976), was a case in which the United States Supreme Court held that a United States District Court may not decline jurisdiction over a case that has properly been removed to it from state court on the ground that the court is backlogged with other cases, and that a District Court's refusal to hear a case on this ground may be reviewed by a writ of mandamus.

== Facts ==
In 1973, two Kentucky citizens sued an Indiana corporation and one of its employees for damages caused by an automobile accident. The suit was initially filed in Kentucky state court, but because the parties were from different states, the defendants removed the case to a federal court, the United States District Court for the Eastern District of Kentucky, based on diversity jurisdiction. The case was assigned to District Judge H. David Hermansdorfer.

It was undisputed that the federal court had diversity jurisdiction over the action and that it had been properly removed to federal court under 28 U.S.C. §§ 1441 and 1446. However, Judge Hermansdorfer declined to entertain the case. He stated that his court was inundated with cases under the Black Lung Act, and that given the statutory priority accorded to criminal cases and Social Security and Black Lung cases, he would not be able to hear the case in a timely fashion. Finding that plaintiffs' rights would be impaired by a long delay in federal court and that defendants would not be prejudiced by having the case heard in state court, Judge Hermansdorfer remanded the case to state court.

The defendants filed a petition for a writ of mandamus or of prohibition in the United States Court of Appeals for the Sixth Circuit, directing the District Court to vacate its order and retain the case. The Sixth Circuit dismissed the petition, relying on 28 U.S.C. § 1447(d), which provides that with one inapplicable exception, "[a]n order remanding a case to the State court from which it was removed is not reviewable on appeal or otherwise."

The defendants then sought review by the Supreme Court, which granted certiorari.

== Opinion of the Court ==
Justice Byron R. White wrote the opinion of the Court, which was joined by Justices William Brennan, Thurgood Marshall, Harry Blackmun, and Lewis Powell. The Court first addressed whether section 1447(d) barred review of the District Court's removal order. In concluding that it did not, the Court reasoned that a District Court's power to remand a case derives from 28 U.S.C. § 1447(c), which provides that "[i]f at any time before final judgment it appears that the case was removed improvidently and without jurisdiction, the district court shall remand the case."

Here, the District Court never found that this case had been removed to it "improvidently" or "without jurisdiction." Rather, the district court remanded the case to state court based on its "heavy docket," which was a consideration "wholly different from those upon which § 1447(c) permits remand." Reviewing the history and language of the removal statute, the Court concluded that sections 1447(c) and (d) must be considered together, so that a remand order unauthorized under section 1447(c) is not subject to the limitation of review under section 1447(d).

The Court then granted the writ of mandamus sought by the parties, because the District Court was required to entertain the removed action, and there was no other procedural means by which the parties could obtain review of its refusal to do so.

== Dissenting opinion ==
Justice William Rehnquist wrote a dissenting opinion, joined by Chief Justice Warren Burger and Justice Potter Stewart. In Rehnquist's view, the Court of Appeals correctly determined that it was without jurisdiction to review the remand order under the express command of Section 1447(d).
