= Doyle v. Ohio =

- Supreme Court of the United States

Argued February 23, 1976 Decided June 17, 1976
- Full case name: Doyle v. Ohio
- Citations: 426 U.S. 610 (more) 96 S. Ct. 2240; 49 L. Ed. 2d 91

Holding
- The defendant's silence in response to a Miranda warning cannot be used against them.

Court membership
- Chief Justice Warren E. Burger Associate Justices William J. Brennan Jr. · Potter Stewart; Byron White · Thurgood Marshall; Harry Blackmun · Lewis F. Powell Jr. William Rehnquist · John P. Stevens

Case opinions
- Majority: Powell, joined by Burger, Brennan, Stewart, White, Marshall
- Dissent: Stevens, joined by Blackmun, Rehnquist

Laws applied
- U.S. Const. amend. XIV, V

Doyle v. Ohio, 426 U.S. 610 (1976), is a United States Supreme Court case regarding the Due Process rights of the Fourteenth Amendment to the Constitution.

== Holding ==
The Supreme Court held that the criminal defendant's silence in response to a Miranda warning cannot be used to impeach them during cross examination.

In 1980 a similar case, Jenkins v. Anderson, reached the Supreme Court, its ruling distinguishing it from Doyle. The Court ruled that the prosecution is permitted to exploit as inculpatory evidence a defendant's failure to disclose an exculpatory testimony eventually presented in trial as defense, to government officials such as police in a prompt manner before the arrest. The petitioner in this case had committed murder and, weeks later, confessed to the crime but, in the process, embroidered the narrative by claiming self-defense as the justification. The prosecution mooted this during trial as evidence of guilt and perjury. After habeas corpus relief, the Supreme Court upheld the conviction, recognizing no breach of the Fourteenth Amendment.

Salinas v. Texas (2013), a plurality opinion, held that mere silence during prearrest interrogations is inadequate to establish invocation of the right to remain silent, if the defendant has already chosen to speak. Specifically, if the defendant has elected to speak to police and then suddenly stops when confronted with inculpatory evidence, the defendant must explicitly invoke his right to remain silent in order for the silence not to be held against him.

== See also ==
- List of United States Supreme Court cases, volume 426
- Jenkins v. Anderson, 447 U.S. 231 (1980)
- Salinas v. Texas, 570 US 178 (2013)
