= Delaware v. Prouse =

- Supreme Court of the United States

Argued January 17, 1979 Decided March 27, 1979
- Full case name: Delaware v. Prouse
- Citations: 440 U.S. 648 (more) 99 S. Ct. 1391; 59 L. Ed. 2d 660

Case history
- Prior: State v. Prouse, 382 A.2d 1359 (Del. 1978); cert. granted, 439 U.S. 816 (1978).

Holding
- Unless there is at least articulable and reasonable suspicion that a motorist is unlicensed, an automobile is not registered, or that either the vehicle or an occupant is otherwise subject to seizure for violation of law, stopping an automobile and detaining the driver to check his driver's license and the registration of the automobile are unreasonable under the Fourth Amendment.

Court membership
- Chief Justice Warren E. Burger Associate Justices William J. Brennan Jr. · Potter Stewart; Byron White · Thurgood Marshall; Harry Blackmun · Lewis F. Powell Jr. William Rehnquist · John P. Stevens

Case opinions
- Majority: White, joined by Burger, Brennan, Stewart, Marshall, Blackmun, Powell, Stevens
- Concurrence: Blackmun, joined by Powell
- Dissent: Rehnquist

Laws applied
- U.S. Const. amends. IV, XIV

Delaware v. Prouse, 440 U.S. 648 (1979), was a United States Supreme Court case in which the Court held that police may not stop motorists without any reasonable suspicion to suspect crime or illegal activity to check their driver's license and auto registration.
