= Rose v. Locke =

- Supreme Court of the United States

Decided November 17, 1975
- Full case name: Rose, Warden v. Locke
- Citations: 423 U.S. 48 (more) 96 S. Ct. 243; 46 L. Ed. 2d 185; 1975 U.S. LEXIS 95

Holding
- Statute proscribing "crime against nature" held not unconstitutionally vague as applied to cunnilingus, as the challenged statutory phrase is no vaguer than many other terms describing criminal offenses at common law, which are now codified in criminal codes

Court membership
- Chief Justice Warren E. Burger Associate Justices William J. Brennan Jr. · Potter Stewart; Byron White · Thurgood Marshall; Harry Blackmun · Lewis F. Powell Jr. William Rehnquist

Case opinions
- Per curiam
- Dissent: Brennan, joined by Marshall
- Dissent: Stewart, joined by Marshall

Rose v. Locke, 423 U.S. 48 (1975), was a United States Supreme Court case in which a Tennessee statute proscribing "crime against nature" was held not unconstitutionally vague as applied to cunnilingus, satisfying as it does the due process standard of giving sufficient warning that men may so conduct themselves as to avoid that which is forbidden. Viewed against that standard, the challenged statutory phrase is no vaguer than many other terms describing criminal offenses at common law, which are now codified in criminal codes. Moreover, the Tennessee Supreme Court by previously rejecting claims that the statute was to be narrowly applied has given sufficiently clear notice that it would be held applicable to acts such as those involved here when such a case as this arose.

== Facts ==
Harold Locke was convicted for having committed a "crime against nature" after entering a women's apartment, threatening her with a knife, and forcing her to submit to his twice performing cunnilingus upon her after forcing her to disrobe.

Locke appealed his conviction on the basis that the statutory term "crimes against nature" could not "in and of itself withstand a charge of unconstitutional vagueness" and being unable to find any Tennessee opinion previously applying the statute to the act of cunnilingus.

== Opinion of the Court ==
In a per curiam decision issued on November 17, 1975, the Court found that the statute was not vague, and, furthermore, Locke could not claim that he was afforded no notice that his conduct might be within the statute's scope.

The Court rejected Locket's arguments, stating that the Tennessee statute's proscription encompassed the act of cunnilingus. As early as 1955, Tennessee had expressly rejected a claim that "crime against nature" did not cover fellatio, repudiating those jurisdictions which had taken a narrow and restrictive definition of the offense. Four years later, the Tennessee Supreme Court was quoted as saying that "the prohibition brings all unnatural copulation with mankind or a beast, including sodomy, within its scope".

Furthermore, other jurisdictions had already reasonably construed identical statutory language to apply to such acts. And given the Tennessee court's clear pronouncements that its statute was intended to effect broad coverage, there was nothing to indicate, clearly or otherwise, that respondent's acts were outside the scope of "crimes against nature".

Therefore, the statute was not vague, and Locke's motion was denied.

=== Brennan's dissent ===
Justice Brennan, with Justice Marshall concurring, first questioned the majority's broad interpretation of crimes against nature.

Of particular significance for this case, as the Court of Appeals accurately stated, "courts have differed widely [423 U.S. 48, 54] in construing the reach of 'crimes against nature' to cunnilingus".

=== Stewart's dissent ===
Justice Stewart, with Justice Marshall concurring, wrote that the case did not align with the ruling of Wainwright v. Stone, 414 U.S. 21. Specifically:

[T]he Florida courts had repeatedly and explicitly ruled that the state law in question prohibited precisely the conduct in which the defendants were found to have engaged. Here, by contrast, the Tennessee courts had never ruled that the act that Locke was found to have committed was covered by the vague and cryptic language of the Tennessee statute. Tenn. Code Ann. 39-707.

== See also ==
- List of United States Supreme Court cases, volume 423
