= Greenholtz v. Inmates of the Nebraska Penal & Correctional Complex =

Greenholtz v. Inmates of the Nebraska Penal and Correctional Complex
- Supreme Court of the United States

Argued January 17, 1979 Decided May 29, 1979
- Full case name: Greenholtz, Chairman, Board of Parole of Nebraska et al. v. Inmates of the Nebraska Penal and Correctional Complex
- Citations: 442 U.S. 1 (more) 99 S. Ct. 2100; 60 L. Ed. 2d 668; 1979 U.S. LEXIS 116

Case history
- Prior: Ruling for prisoners on their 42 U.S.C. § 1983 claim affirmed by the Eighth Circuit, 576 F.2d 1274 (8th Cir. 1975); cert. granted, 439 U.S. 817 (1975).

Holding
- Assuming that Nebraska's parole revocation scheme implicates a fundamental liberty interest protected by the Due Process Clause, Nebraska's procedural mechanism provides all the process that is due an inmate under the Clause.

Court membership
- Chief Justice Warren E. Burger Associate Justices William J. Brennan Jr. · Potter Stewart; Byron White · Thurgood Marshall; Harry Blackmun · Lewis F. Powell Jr. William Rehnquist · John P. Stevens

Case opinions
- Majority: Burger, joined by Stewart, White, Blackmun, Rehnquist
- Concur/dissent: Powell
- Dissent: Marshall, joined by Brennan, Stevens

Laws applied
- U.S. Const. amend. XIV

Greenholtz v. Inmates of the Nebraska Penal and Correctional Complex, 442 U.S. 1 (1979), was a United States Supreme Court case in which the Court held that when state law requires the state to grant parole whenever a prisoner satisfies certain conditions, due process requires the state to allow the prisoner to present evidence in support of his request for parole and to furnish a written explanation of the reasons why his request has been denied.

== Background ==
Nebraska had both mandatory and discretionary parole. Mandatory parole meant that the prisoner must be released when he had served the full length of his sentence, less any good time credits. Discretionary parole meant that a prisoner who satisfied the state's criteria for being a good candidate for early release would be released in the discretion of the state's Board of Parole.

Under Nebraska's discretionary parole system, all prisoners were reviewed each year regardless of whether they were yet eligible for parole. At this initial hearing, the Board examined the prisoner's entire preconfinement and postconfinement record and considered any statements or letters the prisoner presented on his own behalf. If the Board determined at this initial hearing that the prisoner was not suitable for parole, then parole was denied and the prisoner was informed as to the Board's reasons for denying parole. If, however, the Board determined at the initial hearing that the prisoner was suitable for parole, then it scheduled a final parole hearing. At this final parole hearing, the prisoner was permitted to present evidence on his behalf and to be represented by private counsel of his choice. He was not, however, permitted to cross-examine witnesses or hear any evidence presented against him. The hearing was recorded. If the Board denied parole at this final hearing, the prisoner was furnished with a written explanation within 30 days.

Nebraska prisoners brought suit in federal court under 42 U.S.C. § 1983, arguing that the Board's procedures denied them due process. The federal district court in Nebraska and the Eighth Circuit agreed. The Eighth Circuit held that, in order to satisfy due process, the State had to adhere to the following procedures:

1. Provide a full formal hearing for each inmate eligible for parole;
2. Notify the prisoner in advance of the hearing and notify him of the factors that the Board may use to reach its decision;
3. Allow the prisoner to appear in person before the Board and present evidence;
4. Maintain a record of the proceedings that is "capable of being reduced to writing";
5. Furnish the prisoner with a full written explanation of the facts on which the Board relied and the reasons for the Board's decision to deny parole.

The Supreme Court agreed to review the Eighth Circuit's requirements to determine whether the Due Process Clause of the Fourteenth Amendment required them.

== Opinion of the Court ==
The Due Process Clause of the Fourteenth Amendment protects against the deprivation of liberty interests at the hands of the state. In order to trigger due process protection, the liberty interest in question must be more than merely abstract or theoretical; it must be something to which a person has a "legitimate claim of entitlement". No prisoner has a liberty interest in being released before his sentence expires, because the trial and appeals processes have ensured that the state has lawfully deprived the person of his interest in being free from confinement. A state may create a parole system for its prisoners, but it is not required to do so. Parole exists as an adjunct to the penological goals of rehabilitation and deterrence. Like the prison system itself, the parole regime is created and managed by the executive branch, which has no obligation to make error-free determinations in executing the laws.

In Morrisey v. Brewer, 408 U.S. 471 (1972), the Court held that due process imposed certain standards on the decision to revoke parole. The Nebraska inmates in this case argued on the basis of Morrisey that due process likewise required certain standards to govern the decision to grant parole. The Court disagreed, because it saw a material difference between the decision to take away freedom already granted and the decision to free someone before their legitimate expectation of release ripens. "The parole release decision is more subtle and depends on an amalgam of elements, some of which are factual but many of which are purely subjective appraisals by the Board members based on their experience with the difficult and sensitive task of evaluating the advisability of parole release". Because the decision to grant parole depends on such subjective factors, and ultimately derives from the mere hope that the Board will grant parole, the Court held that there was no per se liberty interest in being granted parole.

However, the particular statute creating Nebraska's parole system used mandatory language, and the prisoners argued that this mandatory language gave rise to a protected liberty interest in parole:

Whenever the Board of Parole considers the release of a committed offender who is eligible for release on parole, it shall order his release unless it is of the opinion that his release should be deferred because:

1. There is a substantial risk that he will not conform to the conditions of parole;
2. His release would depreciate the seriousness of his crime or promote disrespect for the law;
3. His release would have a substantially adverse effect on institutional discipline; or
4. His continued correctional treatment, medical care, or vocational or other training in the facility would substantially enhance his capacity to lead a law-abiding life when released at a later date.

Although this statute did use the word "shall", the Court did not interpret it to mean that a decision that takes into account these criteria should for that reason alone embody the full protections of an adversarial hearing. The Court ruled that the prisoner's opportunity to make a statement on his own behalf minimized the risk of error and thus satisfied due process because the Board had before it the prisoner's entire file. Due process did not require the Board to articulate the specific evidence on which it had relied, because this would tend to make the hearings more adversarial in nature. The fact that the Board communicated the reasons for its denial, couching its explanation in terms of guidance for the prisoner's future growth, was sufficient. "The Nebraska procedure affords an opportunity to be heard, and when parole is denied it informs the inmate in what respects he falls short of qualifying for parole; this affords the process that is due under these circumstances. The Constitution does not require more."

=== Concurring opinion ===
Justice Powell believed that there was a liberty interest in being released on parole that stemmed from the Due Process Clause, independent of the statutory language used to create an individual state's parole system. Powell rejected the distinction the majority made between a hoped-for release and a previously granted release. "When a State adopts a parole standard that applies general standards of eligibility, prisoners justifiably expect that parole will be granted fairly and according to law whenever those standards are met." This expectation, in turn, was the source of the liberty interest Powell believed was protected by the Due Process Clause.

Powell also believed that there was no significant prejudice to the state in notifying the prisoner in advance about the evidence to be used at the hearing, so as to allow the prisoner to prepare his statement.

=== Dissenting opinion ===
Justice Marshall also believed that the Due Process Clause gave rise to a liberty interest in being released on parole, and rejected the majority's distinction between release and revocation. That difference was not constitutionally significant, Marshall argued, because the Court had recognized a liberty interest in future freedom in other contexts. Marshall observed that the Court's prior decisions never had held that the process due a person upon a deprivation of liberty depended on the extent to which subjective determinations were involved. Finally, parole was such an integral part of the criminal sentencing scheme that it was difficult for Marshall to imagine that there was not an abstract liberty interest in parole.

Marshall also argued that the majority did not correctly applied the three-part test in Mathews v. Eldridge, 424 U.S. 319 (1976). The Court focused solely on the risk of an erroneous deprivation, without looking at the other two Mathews prongs—the nature of the interest at stake and the burden on the government that a marginal increase in procedural protections entails. "Certainly the interest in being released from incarceration is of sufficient magnitude to have some bearing on the process due." Moreover, the Court did not even focus on the risk of error that the Nebraska procedure actually entailed, with the result that its analysis of the effect on that risk additional procedures would have was necessarily skewed as well. Finally, due process also required that the procedures appear fair as well as actually be fair. The Court had ignored this aspect of the due process analysis as well.

Although Marshall agreed that a formal hearing was not required, he did believe that fairness required the Board to notify the inmates sufficiently far in advance to allow them to prepare their cases and retain counsel if they so desire. Marshall also believed that fundamental fairness required the Board to state the evidence on which it had relied in denying parole. This requirement would focus the Board more carefully on the statutory criteria and promote a more careful consideration of the evidence, while at the same time affording the inmates to contest factual inaccuracies in the record. The marginal increased burden on the Board was slight in comparison to the increased fairness these features would provide.
