= United States v. Sells Engineering, Inc. =

- Supreme Court of the United States

Argued March 2, 1983 Decided June 30, 1983
- Full case name: United States v. Sells Engineering, Inc.
- Docket no.: 81-1032
- Citations: 463 U.S. 418 (more) 103 S. Ct. 3133; 77 L. Ed. 2d 743
- Argument: Oral argument
- Opinion announcement: Opinion announcement

Holding
- Attorneys in the Civil Division of the Justice Department and their assistants and staff may not obtain automatic (A)(i) disclosure of grand jury materials for use in a civil suit, but must instead seek a (C)(i) court order for access to such materials.

Court membership
- Chief Justice Warren E. Burger Associate Justices William J. Brennan Jr. · Byron White; Thurgood Marshall · Harry Blackmun; Lewis F. Powell Jr. · William Rehnquist; John P. Stevens · Sandra Day O'Connor

Case opinions
- Majority: Brennan, joined by White, Marshall, Blackmun, Stevens
- Dissent: Burger, joined by Powell, Rehnquist, O'Connor

Laws applied
- Federal Rules of Criminal Procedure (or relevant rules of a circuit court)

United States v. Sells Engineering, Inc., 463 U.S. 418 (1983), was a United States Supreme Court case concerning whether United States Department of Justice Civil Division attorneys were required to show particularized need in order to obtain disclosure.

== Opinion of the Court ==
In an opinion delivered by Justice Brennan, the Court decided in favor of Sells Engineering.
