= List of United States Supreme Court cases, volume 423 =

This is a list of all the United States Supreme Court cases from volume 423 of the United States Reports:

| Case name | Citation | Date decided |
|---|---|---|
| United States v. Maine | 423 U.S. 1 | 1975 |
| Day & Zimmermann, Inc. v. Challoner | 423 U.S. 3 | 1975 |
| Boehning v. Ind. State Employees Ass'n, Inc. | 423 U.S. 6 | 1975 |
| Connecticut v. Menillo | 423 U.S. 9 | 1975 |
| N. Ind. Pub. Serv. Co. v. Izaak Walton League of Am., Inc. | 423 U.S. 12 | 1975 |
| Rose v. Hodges | 423 U.S. 19 | 1975 |
| Transamerican Freight Lines, Inc. v. Brada Miller Freight Systems, Inc. | 423 U.S. 28 | 1975 |
| Turner v. Utah Dept. of Employment Sec. | 423 U.S. 44 | 1975 |
| Rose v. Locke | 423 U.S. 48 | 1975 |
| Menna v. New York | 423 U.S. 61 | 1975 |
| Dillingham v. United States | 423 U.S. 64 | 1975 |
| Texas v. White (1975 case) | 423 U.S. 67 | 1975 |
| Bray v. United States | 423 U.S. 73 | 1975 |
| United States v. Moore | 423 U.S. 77 | 1975 |
| United States v. Powell | 423 U.S. 87 | 1975 |
| Michigan v. Mosley | 423 U.S. 96 | 1975 |
| United States v. Moore | 423 U.S. 122 | 1975 |
| Weinstein v. Bradford | 423 U.S. 147 | 1975 |
| Am. Foreign S.S. Co. v. Matise | 423 U.S. 150 | 1975 |
| Laing v. United States | 423 U.S. 161 | 1976 |
| Barrett v. United States | 423 U.S. 212 | 1976 |
| Foremost-McKeeson, Inc. v. Provident Sec. Co. | 423 U.S. 232 | 1976 |
| Mathews v. Weber | 423 U.S. 261 | 1976 |
| Michelin Tire Corp. v. Wages | 423 U.S. 276 | 1976 |
| United States v. Bornstein | 423 U.S. 303 | 1976 |
| Dove v. United States | 423 U.S. 325 | 1976 |
| FPC v. Transcon'l Gas Pipe Line Corp. | 423 U.S. 326 | 1976 |
| Thermtron Products, Inc. v. Hermansdorfer | 423 U.S. 336 | 1976 |
| Rizzo v. Goode | 423 U.S. 362 | 1976 |
| Nat'l Ind. Coal Operators’ Ass'n v. Kleppe | 423 U.S. 388 | 1976 |
| Kleppe v. Delta Mining, Inc. | 423 U.S. 403 | 1976 |
| United States v. Watson | 423 U.S. 411 | 1976 |
| Alexander v. Gardner-Denver Co. | 423 U.S. 1058 | 1976 |
| Hortonville Joint Sch. Dist. v. Hortonville Ed. Ass'n | 423 U.S. 1301 | 1975 |
| Smith v. United States (1975) | 423 U.S. 1303 | 1975 |
| Chamber of Com. v. Legal Aid Soc'y | 423 U.S. 1309 | 1975 |
| Whalen v. Roe | 423 U.S. 1313 | 1975 |
| Neb. Press Ass'n v. Stuart I | 423 U.S. 1319 | 1975 |
| Neb. Press Ass'n v. Stuart II | 423 U.S. 1327 | 1975 |
| Pasadena City Bd. of Educ. v. Spangler | 423 U.S. 1335 | 1975 |
