= North Dakota State Board of Pharmacy v. Snyder's Drug Stores, Inc. =

- Supreme Court of the United States

Argued November 6, 1973 Decided December 5, 1973
- Full case name: North Dakota State Board of Pharmacy v. Snyder's Drug Stores, Inc.
- Citations: 414 U.S. 156 (more) 94 S. Ct. 407; 38 L. Ed. 2d 379; 1973 U.S. LEXIS 181

Case history
- Prior: Snyder's Drug Stores, Inc. v. N. Dakota State Bd. of Pharmacy, 202 N.W.2d 140 (N.D. 1972); cert. granted, 411 U.S. 947 (1973).

Court membership
- Chief Justice Warren E. Burger Associate Justices William O. Douglas · William J. Brennan Jr. Potter Stewart · Byron White; Thurgood Marshall · Harry Blackmun; Lewis F. Powell Jr. · William Rehnquist

Case opinion
- Majority: Douglas, joined by unanimous

Laws applied
- 28 U.S.C. § 1257

North Dakota State Board of Pharmacy v. Snyder's Drug Stores, Inc., 414 U.S. 156 (1973), held that a state statute, under which Snyder's had been denied a pharmacy operating permit because it was not majority owned by pharmacists, did not violate the Due Process Clause of the Fourteenth Amendment. The court overruled the decision of the North Dakota Supreme Court, which relied on the 1928 decision in Liggett Co. v. Baldridge to hold the statute unconstitutional.

The questions which were raised by the case were: (1) Does the U.S. Supreme Court have jurisdiction to decide the case, e.g. is it final; (2) was the statute in question constitutional. The Supreme Court answered both questions in the affirmative.

With respect to point (1), the State Board of Pharmacy, being a state agency, is bound by the decisions of the State Supreme Court. Absent an appeal to the U.S. Supreme Court, it has to abide by what its State's Supreme Court says regarding the constitutionality of a state law. While the State Supreme Court had remanded the case back to the Pharmacy Board for further proceedings, this did not mean the case was nonappealable. State law allows any party aggrieved by the decision to appeal it in court. The problem is, the board itself is not a party to the decision, but is the tribunal making the decision. Thus, under the law of its state, the Board's only options to be able to raise the constitutional question are either to defy its own state's Supreme Court and refuse to grant the license, thus causing respondent Snyder's to go back into court again, or for the Board to appeal to the U.S. Supreme Court. Thus, since the Board really had nowhere to go to obtain relief, the U.S. Supreme Court does have standing to hear the case.

With respect to point (2), the case in Liggett regarded a state law that required 100% ownership by pharmacists. The law in this case required a licensee wanting to operate a pharmacy be either a pharmacist or a corporation where the majority of the stockholders were pharmacists. The owner of Snyder's Drug Stores was Red Owl, a supermarket chain, and it was not shown if the majority of the stockholders of Red Owl were pharmacists. It was a decision regarding substantive due process. However, the court's reasoning on substantive due process was not completely clear and not all of the justices agreed on how to decide the cases. As the point in requiring a pharmacy to be majority owned by pharmacists was to provide a higher degree of care and concern over the operation of a pharmacy, the court found the statute to be a constitutional use of legislative power which "bears a real and substantial relation to the public health, safety, morals, or some other phase of the general welfare,"

== See also ==
- List of United States Supreme Court cases, volume 418
