= List of United States Supreme Court cases, volume 415 =

This is a list of all the United States Supreme Court cases from volume 415 of the United States Reports:

Case name	Citation	Date decided
Renegotiation Bd. v. Bannercraft Clothing Co.	415 U.S. 1	1974
Alexander v. Gardner-Denver Co.	415 U.S. 36	1974
Sampson v. Murray	415 U.S. 61	1974
Windward Shipping (London) Ltd. v. Am. Radio Ass'n	415 U.S. 104	1974
Phillips Petroleum Co. v. Texaco Inc.	415 U.S. 125	1974
Lewis v. City of New Orleans	415 U.S. 130	1974
United States v. Kahn	415 U.S. 143	1974
United States v. Matlock	415 U.S. 164	1974
Curtis v. Loether	415 U.S. 189	1974
Morton v. Ruiz	415 U.S. 199	1974
United States v. Kahan	415 U.S. 239	1974
Memorial Hosp. v. Maricopa Cnty.	415 U.S. 250	1974
Mississippi v. Arkansas I	415 U.S. 289	1974
Mississippi v. Arkansas II	415 U.S. 302	1974
Patterson v. Warner	415 U.S. 303	1974
Davis v. Alaska	415 U.S. 308	1974
NLRB v. Magnavox Co.	415 U.S. 322	1974
Speight v. Slayton	415 U.S. 333	1974
National Cable Tel. Ass'n, Inc. v. United States	415 U.S. 336	1974
FPC v. New England Power Co.	415 U.S. 345	1974
Johnson v. Robison	415 U.S. 361	1974
Hernandez v. VA	415 U.S. 391	1974
Teleprompter Corp. v. CBS	415 U.S. 394	1974
Granny Goose Foods, Inc. v. Teamsters	415 U.S. 423	1974
DeMarco v. United States	415 U.S. 449	1974
Steffel v. Thompson	415 U.S. 452	1974
United States v. General Dynamics Corp. (1974)	415 U.S. 486	1974
Hagans v. Lavine	415 U.S. 528	1974
Smith v. Goguen	415 U.S. 566	1974
City of Philadelphia v. Education Equality League	415 U.S. 605	1974
Edelman v. Jordan	415 U.S. 651	1974
Eaton v. City of Tulsa	415 U.S. 697	1974
Lubin v. Panish	415 U.S. 709	1974
Storer v. Brown	415 U.S. 724	1974
American Party v. White	415 U.S. 767	1974
United States v. Edwards	415 U.S. 800	1974
Huddleston v. United States (1974)	415 U.S. 814	1974
Hughes v. Thompson	415 U.S. 1301	1974
Hayakawa v. Brown	415 U.S. 1304	1974
