= Florida v. Royer =

- Supreme Court of the United States

Argued October 12, 1982 Decided March 23, 1983
- Full case name: Florida v. Royer
- Citations: 460 U.S. 491 (more) 103 S. Ct. 1319; 75 L. Ed. 2d 229; 1983 U.S. LEXIS 151

Holding
- While it is legal for authorities to target and approach a person based on their behavior, absent more, they cannot detain or search such individual without a warrant or probable cause.

Court membership
- Chief Justice Warren E. Burger Associate Justices William J. Brennan Jr. · Byron White; Thurgood Marshall · Harry Blackmun; Lewis F. Powell Jr. · William Rehnquist; John P. Stevens · Sandra Day O'Connor

Case opinions
- Plurality: White, joined by Marshall, Powell, Stevens
- Concurrence: Brennan
- Concurrence: Powell
- Dissent: Blackmun
- Dissent: Rehnquist, joined by Burger, O'Connor

Laws applied
- U.S. Const. amend. IV

Florida v. Royer, 460 U.S. 491 (1983), was a U.S. Supreme Court case dealing with issues involving the Fourth Amendment. Specifically, the case establishes a firm line in cases where police conduct search and seizure without a warrant. The court ruled that, while it is legal for authorities to target and approach a person based on their behavior, absent more, they cannot detain or search such individual without a warrant.

== Background ==
In January 1978, two undercover officers approached the plaintiff, Mr. Royer, at the Miami International Airport because he fit a drug courier profile: He was a casually dressed, nervous young man carrying heavy luggage. Also, he paid cash for his ticket and filled out his baggage tag only with a name and destination.

The officers identified themselves and asked if he would speak with them. He consented and, at their request, produced his airline ticket and his driver's license. He became visibly nervous when the officers noted that the ticket and driver's license bore different names, and then they told him they suspected him of transporting narcotics.

Without returning his ticket or license, they asked him to accompany them to a small room off the concourse. He said nothing in response but went with them. Without his consent, they retrieved his luggage and brought it to the room. When asked if he would consent to a search of his suitcases, again he did not speak, but handed the officers a key. When the officers opened the suitcase, they discovered it contained marijuana.

== Decision ==
The Supreme Court held that, although the officers correctly approached Mr. Royer in the airport, they moved him without his consent to the small room and held him there without probable cause. Therefore, his consent to search the suitcase resulted from an illegal custody and the marijuana discovered could not be admitted into evidence. The officers should not have asked the suspect to accompany them from the point of the initial consensual encounter to the small room until they returned his ticket and license. There was nothing to indicate the officers had any concern for their safety, or any legitimate need related to the limited purpose of the initial Terry stop. The court makes its decision about custody/non-custody based on everything police say or do—the totality of circumstances test. The officers also told him they suspected him of transporting narcotics, and then confined him in a small, enclosed room. If that were not enough, they retrieved his luggage without his consent. Thus, the Court held that a reasonable man would believe he was either under arrest, or in a custodial situation functionally equivalent to arrest. Since the officers only had reasonable suspicion, not probable cause to believe he was transporting narcotics until they opened the suitcase and found the marijuana (which they admitted in court), they had no legal right to place Mr. Royer in custody.
