= Goss v. Lopez =

- Supreme Court of the United States

Argued October 16, 1974 Decided January 22, 1975
- Full case name: Goss, et al. v. Lopez, et al.
- Docket no.: 73-898
- Citations: 419 U.S. 565 (more) 95 S. Ct. 729; 42 L. Ed. 2d 725; 1975 U.S. LEXIS 23

Case history
- Prior: Appeal from the United States District Court for the Southern District of Ohio

Holding
- The students' suspension from a public school without a hearing violated the due process right protected by the Fourteenth Amendment.

Court membership
- Chief Justice Warren E. Burger Associate Justices William O. Douglas · William J. Brennan Jr. Potter Stewart · Byron White; Thurgood Marshall · Harry Blackmun; Lewis F. Powell Jr. · William Rehnquist

Case opinions
- Majority: White, joined by Douglas, Brennan, Stewart, Marshall
- Dissent: Powell, joined by Burger, Blackmun, Rehnquist

Laws applied
- Fourteenth Amendment to the United States Constitution

Goss v. Lopez, 419 U.S. 565 (1975), is a landmark United States Supreme Court case. It held that a public school must conduct a hearing before subjecting a student to suspension. Also, a suspension without a hearing violates the Due Process Clause of the Fourteenth Amendment of the United States Constitution.

== Background ==
Nine students, including a student named Dwight Lopez, were suspended from Central High School in Columbus, Ohio, for 10 days for destroying school property and disrupting the learning environment.

Ohio Law § 3313.66 empowered the school principal to suspend students for 10 days or expel them.

The law required students' parents to be notified of the action within 24 hours to be given the reason.

If students were expelled, they could appeal to the Board of Education, but §3313.66 gave no such allowances if they were suspended.

A three-judge District Court struck down the law as a violation of students' right to due process of law. The United States District Court for the Southern District of Ohio held:

Having chosen to extend the right to an education to people of appellees' class generally, Ohio may not withdraw that right on grounds of misconduct or absent fundamentally fair procedures to determine whether the misconduct has occurred, and must recognize a student's legitimate entitlement to a public education as a property interest that is protected by the Due Process Clause, and that may not be taken away for misconduct without observing minimum procedures required by that Clause.

— 419 U.S. 565 (1975), pp. 573–74.

The District Court reprimanded the school for its violation of the 14th Amendment, as there were "minimum requirements of notice and a hearing prior to suspension, except in emergency situations." The case was appealed by the school to the Supreme Court. .

== Majority opinion ==
Justice Byron R. White delivered the opinion of the Court, on behalf of a narrow 5-4 majority. It held that the state had violated due process by suspending the students without a hearing. The state had made education a fundamental right by providing for free public education for all residents between 5 and 21. The Court stated that protected interests are created not by the Constitution but by its institutions (Board of Regents v. Roth).

The Court held that a 10-day suspension was not a de minimis deprivation of property. It also stated that suspending students had the potential of seriously harming their reputation and affecting their future employment and education. The Court also held that the state had no authority to deprive students of their property interest in educational benefits or their liberty interest in reputation, without due process of law.

The Court reiterated the principle, first clearly formulated in Tinker v. Des Moines School Dist. but established in a long line of decisions before that case, students "do not shed their constitutional rights at the schoolhouse door."

== Dissenting opinion ==
Lewis Powell wrote the dissent that argued that the Ohio statute had granted the right to education, not the right to education without discipline. He challenged the court's finding that the suspension was severe enough to bring the Due Process Clause into play.

Powell also argued that the safeguards provided by the Ohio statute were sufficient. The statute required the student's parents and the Board of Education to be given written notice of the suspension and "reasons therefor" within 24 hours. Powell also argued that the informal hearing proposed by the majority would not provide significantly more protection.

Powell criticized at length the Court's interference with the operation of schools, claiming that the vast majority of students viewed suspension as “a welcome holiday” free of lasting consequence. He argued that minors should be and are treated differently under the law and that the Court was turning its back on precedent. Powell concluded that the majority's decision would allow students to claim due process violations when they were excluded from extracurricular activities, failed from a course, promoted, required to take certain subjects, transferred from one school to another, or bused to a distant school.
