= Russello v. United States =

- Supreme Court of the United States

Submitted September 9, 1982 Argued October 5, 1983 Decided November 1, 1983
- Full case name: Russello v. United States
- Citations: 464 U.S. 16 (more)
- Argument: [82-472 Oral argument]

Questions presented
- Does the term "interest" as used in 18 U.S.C. §1983(a)(1) of the RICO statute include income or profits derived from a pattern of racketeering activity?

Holding
- The term "interest," as used in 18 U.S.C. §1983(a)(1) of the RICO statute, does include income or profits derived from a pattern of racketeering activity.

Court membership
- Chief Justice Warren E. Burger Associate Justices William J. Brennan Jr. · Byron White; Thurgood Marshall · Harry Blackmun; Lewis F. Powell Jr. · William Rehnquist; John P. Stevens · Sandra Day O'Connor

Case opinion
- Majority: Blackmun, joined by Burger, Brennan, White, Marshall, Powell, Rehnquist, Stevens, O'Connor

Laws applied
- 18 U.S.C. §1963(a)(1)

Russello v. United States, 464 U.S. 16 (1983), was a decision by the U.S. Supreme Court interpreting the forfeiture provision 18 U.S.C. §1963(a)(1) of the Racketeer Influenced and Corrupt Organizations Act (RICO) to hold that any "interest" acquired in violation of 18 U.S.C. §1962 may include a broad range of racketeering profits derived from the RICO enterprise, not only interest reinvested into the enterprise. The case established that the primary purpose of RICO's forfeiture provisions as to disgorge illicit profits gained and eliminate the financial motive to use legitimate businesses for criminal purposes.

== Background ==
Between July 1973 and April 1976, a insurance fraud ring made up of Joseph C. Russello and his associates defrauded insurance companies by burning down residential and commercial properties in Tampa and Miami. Together, the group composed of insurance adjusters, homeowners, promoters, financiers, and arsonists. Originally, they burned down buildings belonging to the group. They later moved on to buying buildings that were specifically suitable to burn, obtained inflated property insurance policies, and then intentionally burned the buildings. The insurance owners filed their fire loss claims with an insurance adjuster belonging to their scheme, who also received a portion of the proceeds.

Russello owned one of the previously-owned buildings that was already covered by fire insurance: the Central Professional Building in Tampa. This building was split into an older front section and a newer large section. Russello had the ring's arsonists "torch" the front section so he could use the insurance money to renovate it. The fire inadvertently spread to the rear section, too, so the ring's insurance adjuster Joseph Carter adjusted his claim to receive an aggregate sum of $340,043 for the fire loss claim in exchange for $30,000 of Russello's proceeds.

On June 8, 1977, Russello and his 22 co-defendants were indicted for a variety of federal crimes including racketeering, mail fraud, and RICO conspiracy in the United States District Court for the Middle District of Florida. Three of the co-defendants pled guilty but twenty were tried by jury, with four found not guilty and the rest found guilty of at least one count. All of the guilty defendants appealed their convictions, challenging the constitutionality of the RICO statute, their indictments and pre-trial motions, and raising double jeopardy concerns . In the United States Court of Appeals for the Fifth Circuit, several of the defendants' convictions were reversed but the rest were affirmed, and they also reversed the judgment of forfeiture of the fraud ring's profits. After several denied writs for certiorari, the Fifth Circuit Court of Appeals granted rehearing to determine the definition of "interest" in the RICO statute, vacated the reversal and affirming the forfeiture judgment on August 2, 1982.
