= List of United States Supreme Court cases, volume 464 =

This is a list of all the United States Supreme Court cases from volume 464 of the United States Reports:

Case name	Citation	Date decided
Autry v. Estelle	464 U.S. 1	1983
Aloha Airlines, Inc. v. Director	464 U.S. 7	1983
Russello v. United States	464 U.S. 16	1983
Norfolk Redevelopment & Housing Auth. v. Ches. & Potomac Tel. Co.	464 U.S. 30	1983
Torres-Valencia v. United States	464 U.S. 44	1983
Maggio v. Williams	464 U.S. 46	1983
Iron Arrow Honor Soc'y v. Heckler	464 U.S. 67	1983
Wainwright v. Goode	464 U.S. 78	1983
ATF v. FLRA	464 U.S. 89	1983
Sullivan v. Wainwright	464 U.S. 109	1983
Rushen v. Spain	464 U.S. 114	1983
United States v. Mendoza	464 U.S. 154	1984
United States v. Stauffer Chem. Co.	464 U.S. 165	1984
INS v. Phinpathya	464 U.S. 183	1984
Comm'r v. Engle	464 U.S. 206	1984
Silkwood v. Kerr-McGee Corp.	464 U.S. 238	1984
Michigan v. Clifford	464 U.S. 287	1984
Sec'y of Interior v. California	464 U.S. 312	1984
Woodard v. Hutchins	464 U.S. 377	1984
Badaracco v. Comm'r	464 U.S. 386	1984
Donovan v. Lone Steer, Inc.	464 U.S. 408	1984
Sony Corp. v. Universal City Studios, Inc.	464 U.S. 417	1984
Press-Enterprise Co. v. Super. Ct.	464 U.S. 501	1984
Daily Income Fund, Inc. v. Fox	464 U.S. 523	1984
McDonough Power Equipment, Inc. v. Greenwood	464 U.S. 548	1984
Autry v. Estelle	464 U.S. 1301	1983
Clark v. California	464 U.S. 1304	1983
McDonald v. Missouri	464 U.S. 1306	1984
