= Storer v. Brown =

- Supreme Court of the United States

Argued November 5, 1973 Decided March 26, 1974
- Full case name: Storer, et al. v. Brown, Secretary of State of California, et al.
- Citations: 415 U.S. 724 (more) 94 S. Ct. 1274; 39 L. Ed. 2d 714; 1974 U.S. LEXIS 118

Case history
- Prior: Appeal from the United States District Court for the Northern District of California
- Subsequent: Rehearing denied sub. nom., Frommhagen v. Brown, 417 U.S. 926 (1974).

Holding
- Section 6830(d) (Supp. 1974) of the California Elections Code is not unconstitutional.

Court membership
- Chief Justice Warren E. Burger Associate Justices William O. Douglas · William J. Brennan Jr. Potter Stewart · Byron White; Thurgood Marshall · Harry Blackmun; Lewis F. Powell Jr. · William Rehnquist

Case opinions
- Majority: White, joined by Burger, Stewart, Blackmun, Powell, Rehnquist
- Dissent: Brennan, joined by Douglas, Marshall

Storer v. Brown, 415 U.S. 724 (1974), was a case in which the Supreme Court of the United States upheld a California law that prohibited an individual from running for an elected office as an independent candidate if they were registered with a political party within the 12 months prior to the primary election.

== See also ==
- List of United States Supreme Court cases, volume 415
