= Briscoe v. LaHue =

- Supreme Court of the United States

Argued November 9, 1982 Decided March 7, 1983
- Full case name: Briscoe v. LaHue
- Citations: 460 U.S. 325 (more) 103 S. Ct. 1108; 75 L. Ed. 2d 96

Case history
- Prior: 663 F.2d 713 (7th Cir. 1981)

Holding
- A defendant in a criminal trial is not entitled to civil damages under the Civil Rights Act of 1871 for perjured testimony against him by police officers.

Court membership
- Chief Justice Warren E. Burger Associate Justices William J. Brennan Jr. · Byron White; Thurgood Marshall · Harry Blackmun; Lewis F. Powell Jr. · William Rehnquist; John P. Stevens · Sandra Day O'Connor

Case opinions
- Majority: Stevens, joined by Burger, White, Powell, Rehnquist, O'Connor
- Dissent: Brennan
- Dissent: Marshall, joined by Blackmun
- Dissent: Blackmun

Laws applied
- 42 U.S.C. § 1983

Briscoe v. LaHue, 460 U.S. 325 (1983), was a United States Supreme Court case in which the Court held that Title 42 U.S.C. § 1983 did not authorize a convicted state defendant to assert a claim for damages against a police officer for giving perjured testimony at the defendant's criminal trial. In other words, police officers have absolute immunity from civil liability for lying on the stand in criminal cases. Officers may still theoretically be criminally liable for perjury, and the Court's reasoning was based on that liability sufficing as a deterrent, but that means the complaint cannot come from the person who faced the harm. The objection must come from agents of the state.
