= Commissioner v. First Security Bank of Utah, N.A. =

Commissioner v. First Security Bank of Utah, N. A.
- Supreme Court of the United States

Argued January 10, 1972 Decided March 21, 1972
- Full case name: Commissioner of Internal Revenue v. First Security Bank of Utah, N. A., et al.
- Citations: 405 U.S. 394 (more) 92 S.Ct. 1085, 31 L. Ed. 2d 318, 29 A.F.T.R.2d 72-781, 72-1 U.S. Tax Cas. (CCH) ¶ 9292A, 1972-1 C.B. 135

Case history
- Prior: 436 F.2d 1192 (10th Cir. 1971)

Holding
- A bank prohibited from doing insurance business did not need to include in gross income the insurance commissions on credit life insurance that the bank referred to an unrelated insurance company.

Court membership
- Chief Justice Warren E. Burger Associate Justices William O. Douglas · William J. Brennan Jr. Potter Stewart · Byron White; Thurgood Marshall · Harry Blackmun; Lewis F. Powell Jr. · William Rehnquist

Case opinions
- Majority: Powell, joined by Burger, Douglas, Brennan, Stewart, Rehnquist
- Dissent: Marshall
- Dissent: Blackmun, joined by White

Laws applied
- 26 U.S.C. § 482

Commissioner v. First Security Bank of Utah, N.A., 405 U.S. 394 (1972), was a Supreme Court case holding that a bank prohibited from doing insurance business did not need to include in gross income the insurance commissions on credit life insurance that the bank referred to an unrelated insurance company. The case syllabus says that "no share of premium received by life insurance company on business referred to it by commonly controlled national banks could be attributed to banks, and holding company did not utilize its control over banks and insurance company to distort their true net incomes, although banks encouraged lenders to take out insurance and referred them to insurance company, where federal banking laws would have prohibited banks from receiving share in premiums."

== Dissent ==
Justice Thurgood Marshall's dissent criticizes the majority opinion's holding that merely because doing insurance would be illegal for a bank, the bank did not do insurance and thus had no insurance commission income.
