= Jenkins v. Anderson =

- Supreme Court of the United States

Argued January 8, 1980 Decided June 10, 1980
- Full case name: Jenkins v. Anderson, Warden
- Citations: 447 U.S. 231 (more) 100 S.Ct. 2124; 65 L. Ed. 2d 86; 1980 U.S. LEXIS 131

Holding
- The Fifth Amendment is not violated by the use of prearrest silence to impeach a criminal defendant's credibility.

Court membership
- Chief Justice Warren E. Burger Associate Justices William J. Brennan Jr. · Potter Stewart; Byron White · Thurgood Marshall; Harry Blackmun · Lewis F. Powell Jr. William Rehnquist · John P. Stevens

Case opinions
- Majority: Powell, joined by Burger, White, Blackmun, Rehnquist
- Concurrence: Stewart
- Concurrence: Stevens
- Dissent: Marshall, joined by Brennan

Jenkins v. Anderson, 447 U.S. 231 (1980), is a United States Supreme Court case regarding the Fifth Amendment right against self-incrimination.

== Holding ==
The Supreme Court held that a defendant's silence prior to a Miranda warning can be used by the prosecution to imply an admission. In Doyle v. Ohio, the Court held that silence after a Miranda warning cannot be used against the defendant to imply admission to guilt.

== See also ==
- List of United States Supreme Court cases, volume 447
- Miranda v. Arizona, 384 U.S. 436 (1966)
- Summary of case from OYEZ
