= List of United States Supreme Court cases, volume 419 =

This is a list of all the United States Supreme Court cases from volume 419 of the United States Reports:

Case name	Citation	Date decided
United States v. Michigan Nat'l Corp.	419 U.S. 1	1974
United States v. American Friends Serv. Comm.	419 U.S. 7	1974
Ring v. United States	419 U.S. 18	1974
Allenberg Cotton Co. v. Pittman	419 U.S. 20	1974
Otte v. United States	419 U.S. 43	1974
Francisco v. Gathright	419 U.S. 59	1974
Saxbe v. Bustos	419 U.S. 65	1974
Gonzalez v. Automatic Employees Credit Union	419 U.S. 90	1974
Regional Rail Reorganization Act Cases	419 U.S. 102	1974
Gulf Oil Corp. v. Copp Paving Co.	419 U.S. 186	1974
American Radio Ass'n v. Mobile S.S. Ass'n, Inc.	419 U.S. 215	1974
Cantrell v. Forest City Pub. Co.	419 U.S. 245	1974
Schick v. Reed	419 U.S. 256	1974
Bowman Transp., Inc. v. Arkansas Best Freight System, Inc.	419 U.S. 281	1974
Summer & Co. v. NLRB	419 U.S. 301	1974
Kelley v. Southern Pac. Co.	419 U.S. 318	1974
Jackson v. Metropolitan Edison Co.	419 U.S. 345	1974
Mississippi v. Arkansas	419 U.S. 375	1974
Fusari v. Steinberg	419 U.S. 379	1975
Sosna v. Iowa	419 U.S. 393	1975
IT&T v. Elec. Workers	419 U.S. 428	1975
Maness v. Meyers	419 U.S. 449	1975
Cousins v. Wigoda	419 U.S. 477	1975
Schlesinger v. Ballard	419 U.S. 498	1975
Taylor v. Louisiana	419 U.S. 522	1975
United States v. Mazurie	419 U.S. 544	1975
Standard Pressed Steel Co. v. Department of Revenue	419 U.S. 560	1975
Goss v. Lopez	419 U.S. 565	1975
North Ga. Finishing, Inc. v. Di-Chem, Inc.	419 U.S. 601	1975
Times-Picayune Pub. Corp. v. Schulingkamp	419 U.S. 1301	1974
Ehrlichman v. Sirica	419 U.S. 1310	1974
Socialist Workers Party v. Attorney Gen.	419 U.S. 1314	1974
National League of Cities v. Brennan	419 U.S. 1321	1974
