= Morton v. Ruiz =

1974 US Supreme Court case involving the Bureau of Indian Affairs

- Supreme Court of the United States

Argued November, 6, 1973 Argued 5–6, 1973 Decided February 20, 1974
- Full case name: Morton, Secretary of the Interior v. Ruiz, et ux.
- Docket no.: 72-1052
- Citations: 415 U.S. 199 (more) 94 S. Ct. 1055; 39 L. Ed. 2d 270; 1974 U.S. LEXIS 99

Court membership
- Chief Justice Warren E. Burger Associate Justices William O. Douglas · William J. Brennan Jr. Potter Stewart · Byron White; Thurgood Marshall · Harry Blackmun; Lewis F. Powell Jr. · William Rehnquist

Case opinion
- Majority: Blackmun, joined by unanimous

Morton v. Ruiz, 415 U.S. 199 (1974), was a case heard before the United States Supreme Court affirming the right of Native Americans living on reservations to receive state assistance.

== Background ==
Ramon Ruiz and his wife Anita were Papago Indians and U.S. citizens who in 1940 left the Papago reservation in Arizona to seek employment 15 miles away at the Phelps-Dodge copper mines at Ajo. They settled in a community called the "Indian Village" and maintained close ties with the nearby reservation.

On December 11, 1967, Mr. Ruiz applied for general assistance benefits from the Bureau of Indian Affairs and was immediately notified by letter that he was ineligible for general benefits because of a provision in 66 Indian Affairs Manual 3.1.4 (1965) that eligibility was limited to Indians living "on reservations" and certain jurisdictions in Alaska and Oklahoma. The legislation authorizing payment of benefits by the BIA had no express residential criteria.

This policy had not been published in the Federal Register or in the Code of Federal Regulations and its only manifestation was solely an internal-operations brochure at the Bureau of Indian Affairs intended to cover policies that "do not relate to the public." Even though the Bureau of Indian Affairs was not required to follow the Administrative Procedure Act Section 553 for benefit disbursement, they expressed internal policies that they would follow it.

== Arguments and ruling ==
Ruiz pursued the class action lawsuit, "entitlement to such general assistance as a matter of statutory interpretation".

The Supreme Court, in an opinion written by Justice Blackmun, held that the internal Section 553 procedures were not followed, and thus benefits could not be limited.

The Supreme Court further said, "[In] order for an agency interpretation to be granted deference, it must be consistent with the congressional purpose. It is evident to us that Congress did not itself intend to limit its authorization to only those Indians directly on, in contrast to those 'near,' the reservation, and that, therefore, the BIA's interpretation must fail."
