= List of United States Supreme Court cases, volume 460 =

This is a list of all the United States Supreme Court cases from volume 460 of the United States Reports:

Case name	Citation	Date decided
Moses H. Cone Memorial Hosp. v. Mercury Constr. Corp.	460 U.S. 1	1983
Perry Educ. Ass'n v. Perry Local Educators' Ass'n	460 U.S. 37	1983
Connecticut v. Johnson	460 U.S. 73	1983
Dickerson v. New Banner Inst., Inc.	460 U.S. 103	1983
City of Lockhart v. United States	460 U.S. 125	1983
Jefferson Cnty. Pharmaceutical Ass'n, Inc. v. Abbott Laboratories	460 U.S. 150	1983
Lockheed Aircraft Corp. v. United States	460 U.S. 190	1983
White v. Massachusetts Council of Constr. Employers, Inc.	460 U.S. 204	1983
EEOC v. Wyoming	460 U.S. 226	1983
United States v. Knotts	460 U.S. 276	1983
Block v. Neal	460 U.S. 289	1983
North Dakota v. United States	460 U.S. 300	1983
Briscoe v. LaHue	460 U.S. 325	1983
Hillsboro Nat'l Bank v. Comm'r	460 U.S. 370	1983
Falls City Industries, Inc. v. Vanco Beverage, Inc.	460 U.S. 428	1983
United States v. Generix Drug Corp.	460 U.S. 453	1983
Ct. Apps. v. Feldman	460 U.S. 462	1983
Florida v. Royer	460 U.S. 491	1983
Thurston Motor Lines, Inc. v. Jordan K. Rand, Ltd.	460 U.S. 533	1983
Washington v. United States (1983)	460 U.S. 536	1983
Illinois v. Abbott & Associates, Inc.	460 U.S. 557	1983
Minneapolis Star & Tribune Co. v. Minn. Comm'r of Revenue	460 U.S. 575	1983
Arizona v. California	460 U.S. 605	1983
Tuten v. United States	460 U.S. 660	1983
Operating Engineers v. Jones	460 U.S. 669	1983
Metropolitan Edison Co. v. NLRB	460 U.S. 693	1983
Postal Serv. v. Aikens	460 U.S. 711	1983
Kush v. Rutledge	460 U.S. 719	1983
Texas v. Brown	460 U.S. 730	1983
United States v. Rylander	460 U.S. 752	1983
Metropolitan Edison Co. v. People Against Nuclear Energy	460 U.S. 766	1983
Anderson v. Celebrezze	460 U.S. 780	1983
Bowsher v. Merck & Co.	460 U.S. 824	1983
