= List of United States Supreme Court cases, volume 440 =

This is a list of all the United States Supreme Court cases from volume 440 of the United States Reports:

Case name	Citation	Date decided
Friedman v. Rogers	440 U.S. 1	1979
Office of Workers' Comp. Programs v. Rasmussen	440 U.S. 29	1979
Butner v. United States	440 U.S. 48	1979
California v. Arizona	440 U.S. 59	1979
Great Atl. & Pac. Tea Co. v. FTC	440 U.S. 69	1979
Vance v. Bradley	440 U.S. 93	1979
Miller v. Youakim	440 U.S. 125	1979
Montana v. United States	440 U.S. 147	1979
Ill. Bd. of Elections v. Socialist Workers Party	440 U.S. 173	1979
FERC v. Shell Oil Co.	440 U.S. 192	1979
Harrah Indep. Sch. Dist. v. Martin	440 U.S. 194	1979
United States v. Bodcaw Co.	440 U.S. 202	1979
Group Life & Health Ins. Co. v. Royal Drug Co.	440 U.S. 205	1979
Aronson v. Quick Point Pencil Co.	440 U.S. 257	1979
Orr v. Orr	440 U.S. 268	1979
Detroit Edison Co. v. NLRB	440 U.S. 301	1979
Quern v. Jordan	440 U.S. 332	1979
Scott v. Illinois	440 U.S. 367	1979
Lake Country Estates, Inc. v. Tahoe Reg'l Plan. Agency	440 U.S. 391	1979
Nevada v. Hall	440 U.S. 410	1979
States are not immune from suit in the courts of other states.
Ramsey v. New York	440 U.S. 444	1979
Anders v. Floyd	440 U.S. 445	1979
Chase Manhattan Bank, N. A. v. Finance Admin.	440 U.S. 447	1979
New Jersey v. Portash	440 U.S. 450	1979
Nat'l Muffler Dealers Ass'n, Inc. v. United States	440 U.S. 472	1979
NLRB v. Cath. Bishop	440 U.S. 490	1979
The National Labor Relations Act does not extend to teachers employed by church-operated schools.
N.Y. Tel. Co. v. N.Y. State Dept. of Labor	440 U.S. 519	1979
N.Y.C. Transit Auth. v. Beazer	440 U.S. 568	1979
Connor v. Coleman	440 U.S. 612	1979
Los Angeles Cnty. v. Davis	440 U.S. 625	1979
Delaware v. Prouse	440 U.S. 648	1979
Leo Sheep Co. v. United States	440 U.S. 668	1979
FCC v. Midwest Video Corp.	440 U.S. 689	1979
United States v. Kimbell Foods, Inc.	440 U.S. 715	1979
United States v. Caceres	440 U.S. 741	1979
Evans v. Bennett	440 U.S. 1301	1979
Haner v. United States	440 U.S. 1308	1979
