= List of United States Supreme Court cases, volume 447 =

This is a list of all the United States Supreme Court cases from volume 447 of the United States Reports:

Case name	Citation	Date decided
United States v. California	447 U.S. 1	1980
Standefer v. United States	447 U.S. 10	1980
Lewis v. BT Investment Managers, Inc.	447 U.S. 27	1980
New York Gaslight Club, Inc. v. Carey	447 U.S. 54	1980
Pruneyard Shopping Center v. Robins	447 U.S. 74	1980
Consumer Product Safety Comm'n v. GTE Sylvania, Inc.	447 U.S. 102	1980
California v. Nevada	447 U.S. 125	1980
Washington v. Confederated Tribes of Colville Reservation	447 U.S. 134	1980
Coffy v. Republic Steel Corp.	447 U.S. 191	1980
Exxon Corp. v. Department of Revenue of Wis.	447 U.S. 207	1980
Jenkins v. Anderson	447 U.S. 231	1980
Agins v. City of Tiburon	447 U.S. 255	1980
United States v. Henry	447 U.S. 264	1980
Diamond v. Chakrabarty	447 U.S. 303	1980
Brown v. Louisiana (1980)	447 U.S. 323	1980
Hicks v. Oklahoma	447 U.S. 343	1980
Bryant v. Yellen	447 U.S. 352	1980
Bifulco v. United States	447 U.S. 381	1980
Anderson v. Charles	447 U.S. 404	1980
Illinois v. Vitale	447 U.S. 410	1980
Reeves, Inc. v. Stake	447 U.S. 429	1980
Carey v. Brown	447 U.S. 455	1980
NLRB v. Longshoremen	447 U.S. 490	1980
Central Hudson Gas & Electric Corp. v. Public Service Commission	447 U.S. 557	1980
NLRB v. Retail Store Employees	447 U.S. 607	1980
Beck v. Alabama	447 U.S. 625	1980
Walter v. United States	447 U.S. 649	1980
United States v. Raddatz	447 U.S. 667	1980
Sun Ship, Inc. v. Pennsylvania	447 U.S. 715	1980
United States v. Payner	447 U.S. 727	1980
Roadway Express, Inc. v. Piper	447 U.S. 752	1980
O'Bannon v. Town Court Nursing Center	447 U.S. 773	1980
Mohasco Corp. v. Silver	447 U.S. 807	1980
