= Terry stop case law =

== Warren Court (1953-1968) ==
- Mapp v. Ohio, 367 U.S. 643 (1961) — incorporated exclusionary rule against the states
- Terry v. Ohio, 392 U.S. 1 (1968) — stop and frisk for weapons OK for officer safety
- Sibron v. New York, 392 U.S. 40 (1968) — companion case to Terry
  - Peters v. New York (1968) — companion case to Terry contained in Sibron

== Burger Court (1969-1986) ==
- Adams v. Williams, 407 U.S. 143 (1972) — extended from violent crimes to drug possession
- United States v. Brignoni-Ponce, 422 U.S. 873 (1975) — not ok for immigration to stop car based solely on "mexican appearance" of occupants
- United States v. Mendenhall, 446 U.S. 544 (1980) — "free to leave"
- United States v. Cortez, 449 U.S. 411 (1981)
- Florida v. Royer, 460 U.S. 491 (1983) — drug courier profile
- Michigan v. Long, 463 U.S. 1032 (1983) — passenger compartment of car
- Immigration and Naturalization Service v. Delgado, 466 U.S. 210 (1984) — "free to continue working"

== Rehnquist Court (1986-2005) ==
- Alabama v. White, 496 U.S. 325 (1990) — anonymous tips with no indication of reliability of tip (also: Prado Navarette v. California)
- Minnesota v. Dickerson, 508 U.S. 366 (1993) — plain view doctrine — incentive to frisk
- Whren v. United States, 517 U.S. 806 (1996)Whren v. United States — pretextual stop
- Maryland v. Wilson, 519 U.S. 408 (1997) — applies to passengers of car
- Illinois v. Wardlow, 528 U.S. 119 (2000) — inference of suspicion from flight (can be extended to any evasive movement)

== Roberts Court (2005-present) ==
- Michigan v. Long, 555 U.S. 323 (2009) — frisk passenger in lawfully stopped car
