= Alabama v. White =

- Supreme Court of the United States

Argued April 17, 1990 Decided June 11, 1990
- Full case name: Alabama v. Vanessa Rose White
- Citations: 496 U.S. 325 (more) 110 S.Ct. 2638, 110 L.Ed.2d 301
- Argument: Oral argument

Holding
- An anonymous tip creates reasonable suspicion to conduct a traffic stop if police can corroborate their observations with the tip's assertions.

Court membership
- Chief Justice William Rehnquist Associate Justices William J. Brennan Jr. · Byron White; Thurgood Marshall · Harry Blackmun; John P. Stevens · Sandra Day O'Connor; Antonin Scalia · Anthony Kennedy

Case opinions
- Majority: White, joined by Rehnquist, Blackmun, O'Connor, Scalia, and Kennedy
- Dissent: Stevens, joined by Marshall, Brennan

Laws applied
- Amendment IV

Alabama v. White, 496 US 325 (1990), is a U.S. Supreme Court case involving the Fourth Amendment. The majority opinion ruled that anonymous tips can provide reasonable suspicion for a traffic stop provided that police can factually verify the circumstances asserted by the tip.

== Background ==
From the mid-1960s to the early 1980s, law enforcement relied on the Aguilar-Spinelli test to show probable cause for investigations involving informant tips. Under the test, police had to show the informant's credibility and facts verified by the officer. Both prongs needed to be independently satisfied. Detailed knowledge in a tip could remedy a defect in police observations. Police observation could also make up for a tip with questionable veracity provided that judicial authorities consider the tip reliable under the standards of Aguilar.

In 1983, the Supreme Court overturned the Spinelli test in favor of a totality of the circumstances rule in Illinois v. Gates. Under this rule, a set of facts gathered from a detailed tip, observations, or a combination of both, satisfy the requirements for probable cause. A robust showing of either informant reliability or knowledge from the officers can compensate for a deficiency in a respective requirement rather than having to analyze each prong independently.

=== White's arrest ===
On April 22, 1987, at approximately 3 PM, the Montgomery, Alabama Police Department received an anonymous tip that Vanessa White would be leaving her apartment at a particular time by driving a brown Plymouth station wagon with a broken right taillight. She would then go to Dobey's Motel. Finally, the tip specified that White possessed approximately an ounce of cocaine in a brown attache case.

When police went to White's apartment complex, they observed a brown Plymouth station wagon with the right taillight broken. After they saw her enter the vehicle, police followed her on the most direct route to Dobey's motel until the station wagon was stopped on the Mobile Highway near the motel. Corporal Davis asked White to step out of the car and walk to its rear. Davis then frankly informed her that she was stopped on suspicion of transporting cocaine. White consented to a request for a vehicle search, which resulted in Davis finding a locked brown attache case. When she told Davis the combination number, the contents of the case turned out to be marijuana. Nonetheless, White was arrested for possession of marijuana, where a search incident to arrest resulted in the seizure of three milligrams of cocaine from her purse.

=== Lower courts ===
When the Montgomery County court system denied her motion to suppress, White pled guilty while retaining her right to appeal. The Alabama Court of Criminal Appeals overturned her conviction on the basis of the informant's shaky credibility and the officers' conclusions from vague observations. The Alabama Supreme Court upheld the Court of Appeals, with the dissent arguing that the decision would cripple law enforcement investigations due to "unrealistic second-guessing."

== Opinion of the Court ==
In a 6–3 decision read by Justice Byron White, the court ruled that the traffic stop and the consent search were based on reasonable suspicion. Although anyone can observe the vehicle and ascertain the description, the police observation of White getting into the car and driving the direct route to Dobey's Motel showed the informant's knowledge of inside information. Thus the totality of the circumstances justified the stop.

=== Stevens' Dissent ===
Justice John P. Stevens dissented by arguing that the informant did not specify how often she went to the motel and that Officer Davis did not make an effort to verify the veracity of the tip. He worried that the decision would open the doors for vengeful people to use their knowledge of a target to incur police harassment with anonymous tips. Additionally, he feared that police would use the pretext of anonymous tips to conduct warrantless stops on any citizen, though he opined that the majority of law enforcement does not condone this practice.

== Subsequent Jurisprudence ==
24 years later, the Supreme Court's majority opinion in Navarette v. California ruled that an anonymous 911 call about suspected criminal traffic violations from a vehicle alone can justify a traffic stop as long as the call provided adequate descriptions of the vehicle(s) and last-known locations.
