= Adams v. Williams =

- Supreme Court of the United States

Argued April 10, 1972 Decided June 12, 1972
- Full case name: Frederick E. ADAMS, Warden, Petitioner, v. Robert WILLIAMS.
- Docket no.: 70-5015
- Citations: 407 U.S. 143 (more) 92 S.Ct. 1921, 32 L.Ed.2d 612
- Argument: Oral argument

Case history
- Prior: Certiorari denied from the Supreme Court of Connecticut. District Court denied federal habeas corpus. Second Circuit Court of Appeals reversed.

Holding
- A tip from an informant who is known to an officer forms reasonable suspicion to frisk a suspect for weapons.

Court membership
- Chief Justice Warren E. Burger Associate Justices William O. Douglas · William J. Brennan Jr. Potter Stewart · Byron White; Thurgood Marshall · Harry Blackmun; Lewis F. Powell Jr. · William Rehnquist

Case opinions
- Majority: Rehnquist, joined by Stewart, White, Blackmun, Powell, Burger
- Dissent: Marshall
- Dissent: Brennan
- Dissent: Douglas

Laws applied
- U.S. Const. amends. IV

Adams v. United States, 407 U.S. 143 (1972), is a United States Supreme Court in which the Court held that tips from a known informant can create enough reasonable suspicion to justify a patdown under Terry v. Ohio.

== Background ==
On October 30, 1966, Bridgeport, Connecticut police sergeant, John Connolly, was driving as part of his early morning patrol duty. At approximately 2:15 AM, an informant who Connolly knew told him that a person in a nearby vehicle possessed drugs with a gun in his waist. After calling for backup, Connolly approached the car, tapped on the window, and asked Robert Williams to open the door. Williams rolled down the window instead; Connolly then reached inside and removed a loaded revolver from his waistband. Williams was arrested for illegally carrying a handgun; a search incident to arrest revealed heroin both inside the car and on his person. Other weapons included a second revolver and a machete inside the vehicle.

During trial, Williams attempted to suppress the evidence on the basis that the State of Connecticut could not demonstrate the reliability of the informant, and that Connolly did not observe him in plain view outside the car. The Supreme Court of Connecticut upheld the conviction.

The District Court and the Court of Appeals for the Second Circuit initially upheld the Connecticut Supreme Court's decision due to taking Connolly's experience and the corroboration of the informant's facts. However, an en banc hearing from the latter court reversed Williams' conviction because Connolly did not have reasonable suspicion to reach into his waistband.

== Opinion of the Court ==
Delivered by Justice William Rehnquist, the majority opinion reversed the Court of Appeals. As opposed to an anonymous tip, the informant was known to Officer Connolly. Additionally, a known informant can be arrested for making a false report. Furthermore, the gun's location lined up with the tip, and Williams' action of rolling down the window increased the chance of him being a threat. Rehnquist concluded that probable cause depends on general circumstances observed by ordinary people rather than specific elements of evidence. As opposed to Aguilar and Spinelli, the informant was well known to Connolly and the circumstances lined up with the tip.

=== Douglas' dissent ===
Justice William Douglas dissented by arguing that Connecticut law does not allow police officers to frisk people on suspicion of not having a valid firearms permit; he further opines that persons possessing narcotics can have permits (provided that those people do not have a record for drug possession). He concludes the dissent by postulating that the arrest would've stuck if it happened in a state with stricter gun laws. Therefore, he would rather have the Second Amendment watered down rather than have "possessory offenses" used as a pretext to intrude on the Fourth Amendment.

=== Brennan's dissent ===
Justice William J. Brennan Jr. dissented that Williams' act of rolling down the window was not enough to satisfy the "armed and dangerous" requirement to justify Connoly's stop.

=== Marshall's dissent ===
Justice Thurgood Marshall dissented by focusing on the reliability of the informant. Previous interactions with Connolly and the informant concerned "public homosexual activities" at a railway station where a followup investigation resulted in no arrests. In addition, the informant did not specify the type of narcotics, nor did he state whether Williams was carrying the gun legally. Even if the initial frisk was legal, Connolly did not ask him if he had a legal reason to carry the weapon. Thus Connolly essentially acted on a hunch based on the word of an informant with questionable veracity.

== Criticism ==
Frederick D. Lewis Jr., a former Dean for the University of Miami School of Law, criticized the majority opinion for potentially deviating from Carroll v. United States and Chimel v. California by declaring a vehicle as an area to be searched incident to arrest.

== Subsequent Jurisprudence ==
While the majority decision in Adams differentiated Williams' circumstances from the events in the Aguilar and Spinelli cases, the latter two were later overturned under Illinois v. Gates. Navarette v. California further upheld that anonymous 911 calls can be used as reasonable suspicion for traffic stops. However, the majority decision of Florida v. J.L. echoed the sentiments of Marshall and Douglas as J.L. was not seen committing crimes other than the possession of a gun (on the basis of an anonymous tip).
