= United States v. Cortez =

- Supreme Court of the United States

Argued December 1, 1980 Decided January 21, 1981
- Full case name: United States v. Jesus E. Cortez and Pedro Hernandez-Loera
- Citations: 449 U.S. 411 (more) 101 S. Ct. 690; 66 L. Ed. 2d 621

Case history
- Prior: United States v. Cortez, 595 F.2d 505 (9th Cir. 1979); cert. granted, 447 U.S. 904 (1980)
- Subsequent: Convictions affirmed on remand, 653 F.2d 1253 (9th Cir. 1979); cert. denied, 455 U.S. 923 (1982); rehearing denied, 455 U.S. 1008 (1982)

Holding
- The objective facts and circumstantial evidence justified the investigative stop of respondents' vehicle.

Court membership
- Chief Justice Warren E. Burger Associate Justices William J. Brennan Jr. · Potter Stewart; Byron White · Thurgood Marshall; Harry Blackmun · Lewis F. Powell Jr. William Rehnquist · John P. Stevens

Case opinions
- Majority: Burger, joined by Brennan, White, Blackmun, Powell, Rehnquist, Stevens
- Concurrence: Stewart
- Concurrence: Marshall

Laws applied
- U.S. Const. Amend. IV

United States v. Cortez, 449 U.S. 411 (1981), was a United States Supreme Court decision clarifying the reasonable suspicion standard for the investigative stop of a vehicle.

== Background ==
Border Patrol officers were monitoring a remote section of the southern Arizona desert known to be a common point for illegal border crossings. The officers repeatedly found human footprints in the sand that indicated that groups of 8 to 20 persons had walked north from the Mexican border to Arizona State Route 86. This pattern of footprints appeared numerous times, always on weekend nights under clear skies. There was also a shoe print with a chevron shape that consistently reappeared, leading the officers to nickname the suspected guide "Chevron."

In late January 1977, Border Patrol officers noticed it had been two weeks since the footprints were last seen, and, moreover, it had rained on Friday and Saturday, meaning that Sunday, January 30/31 would be a likely night for "Chevron" to lead another crossing. The Border Patrol officers waited a few miles from where the footprints usually met the state highway. The officers waited from 2 am to 6 am. In this desolate area, only around 15 vehicles passed by, and only two were large enough to fit a large number of passengers. Of these vehicles, a pickup truck with a camper shell passed the officers at 4:30 am going westbound. Then, at 6:12 am, the same vehicle passed the officers again going eastbound. The officers then stopped the vehicle. They found six unauthorized immigrants in the back of the camper, and arrested Jesus Cortez, the vehicle's driver.

The Ninth Circuit ruled that the officers did not have a sufficient basis to justify the stop. The Court of Appeals relied on United States v. Brignoni-Ponce, ruling that the officers "did not have a valid basis for singling out the Cortez vehicle" and had violated Cortez's Fourth Amendment rights.

== Opinion of the Court ==
The Supreme Court unanimously reversed the Ninth Circuit, ruling that the Border Patrol had reasonable suspicion to stop Cortez's vehicle. Chief Justice Burger emphasized that reasonable suspicion must be based on the "totality of the circumstances," and does not depend on "hard certainties, but ... probabilities." Officers who stop a vehicle must have a "particularized and objective basis for suspecting the particular person stopped," but are allowed to use their experience and training to "draw inferences and make deductions."

The Court found that the officers in this case made "permissible deductions" from the known facts and had a "legitimate basis for suspicion." Based on their familiarity with the area and on their two-month period of observation, the officers concluded that "Chevron" had a regular pattern of operations. Based on this pattern, it is "not surprising that when [the officers] stopped the vehicle on its return trip it contained 'Chevron' and several illegal aliens." The Chief Justice praised the officers' work, writing, "We see here the kind of police work often suggested by judges and scholars as examples of appropriate and reasonable means of law enforcement."

In a concurrence, Justice Stewart highlighted the facts of the case, writing, "this nocturnal round trip into desolate desert terrain" was "in any event ... puzzling," but "coming when and as it did, surely the most likely explanation for it was that Chevron was again shepherding aliens."

Justice Marshall concurred without opinion.

== See also ==
- List of United States Supreme Court cases
- List of United States Supreme Court cases, volume 449
