= Washington v. Chrisman =

- Supreme Court of the United States

Argued November 3, 1981 Decided January 13, 1982
- Full case name: Washington v. Chrisman
- Docket no.: 81-1349
- Citations: 455 U.S. 1 (more)
- Argument: Oral argument
- Opinion announcement: Opinion announcement

Case history
- Prior: Conviction upheld, 600 P.2d 1316 (Wa. Ct. App. 1979); Reversed, 619 P.2d 971 (Wa. 1980); cert. granted
- Subsequent: Lower court reversed, 676 P.2d 419 (Wa. 1984)

Holding
- An arresting officer can monitor the movements of the arrested individual, including by remaining at their side regardless of where they go.

Court membership
- Chief Justice Warren E. Burger Associate Justices William J. Brennan Jr. · Byron White; Thurgood Marshall · Harry Blackmun; Lewis F. Powell Jr. · William Rehnquist; John P. Stevens · Sandra Day O'Connor

Case opinions
- Majority: Burger, joined by Blackmun, Powell, Rehnquist, Stevens, O'Connor
- Dissent: White, joined by Brennan, Marshall

Laws applied
- U.S. Const. amend. IV

Washington v. Chrisman, 455 U.S. 1 (1982), was a United States Supreme Court case in which the Court held that it is not a violation of the Fourth Amendment for an arresting officer to accompany the arrested at all times, regardless of where they go. Additionally, the Court held that an officer entering a room to accompany an arrested individual is a circumstance which permits seizure under the plain view doctrine.

== Background ==
In January of 1978, a university police officer stopped Carl Overdahl, a student at Washington State University, who was carrying a bottle of alcohol and appeared to be underage. Upon being asked for ID, he informed the officer that his identification was in his dorm room and asked for permission to retrieve it. The officer agreed on the condition that he be accompanied by the officer, to which Overdahl agreed.

The officer remained in the doorway while Overdahl retrieved his ID, during which he observed Chrisman, Overdahl's roommate, acting nervously at the sight of a police officer and moving to hide a small medical box.

Soon after Overdahl entered the room, the officer noted some seeds he believed to be marijuana and a pipe he believed to be used for smoking them laying on a table, and entered the room to examine them.

The officer then informed each of the students of their Miranda rights, which they acknowledged and voluntarily waived. Chrisman subsequently turned over the medical box he previously had moved, which contained marijuana and cash.

A full search of the room was deemed necessary by the officer, who requested a secondary officer come to the scene. Both officers explained to the students that they had the right to request the officers first obtain a search warrant, but they could voluntarily consent to a search. After deliberation, the students chose to consent to the search and signed forms to that effect.

The search revealed more marijuana as well as a quantity of LSD. Chrisman was subsequently charged with two felonies relating to the possession of a controlled substance.

At trial, a motion to suppress was denied, and Chrisman was convicted on both counts. The Washington Court of Appeals upheld the convictions, but the Supreme Court of Washington reversed, holding that the officer had no right or reason to enter the room without a warrant.

== Holding ==
The Supreme Court reversed on appeal. The majority held that an arresting officer can monitor the movements of the arrested, and to remain at their side and follow them wherever they go. Because every arrest could present a potential danger to the officer, it was not a violation of the Fourth Amendment for the officer to continually monitor the arrested. As the officer had a legitimate purpose to be inside the room, his seizure of the substances was legal under the plain view doctrine.

=== Dissent ===
In his dissent, Justice White agreed that the officer could accompany Overdahl into his room should he have deemed it necessary to maintain control of the situation. However, White asserted that the record showed the officer had left the doorway solely to confirm his suspicion of the presence of marijuana, meaning no exigent circumstances existed to justify his entry under the plain view doctrine. He instead recommended the case be remanded to determine whether exigent circumstances existed.

== Subsequent ==
The Supreme Court of Washington subsequently clarified its original ruling at the request of Chrisman, again reversing the lower court, but basing its decision instead on the Washington Constitution.
