= Minnesota v. Clover Leaf Creamery Co. =

- Supreme Court of the United States

Argued November 3, 1980 Decided January 21, 1981
- Full case name: Minnesota v. Clover Leaf Creamery Co.
- Citations: 449 U.S. 456 (more) 101 S. Ct. 715; 66 L. Ed. 2d 659

Case history
- Prior: Clover Leaf Creamery Co. v. State, 289 N.W.2d 79 (Minn. 1979)

Holding
- There is no violation of the equal protection or commerce clauses in a state statute banning retail sale of milk in plastic nonreturnable, nonrefillable containers, but permitting such sale in other nonreturnable, nonrefillable containers.

Court membership
- Chief Justice Warren E. Burger Associate Justices William J. Brennan Jr. · Potter Stewart; Byron White · Thurgood Marshall; Harry Blackmun · Lewis F. Powell Jr. William Rehnquist · John P. Stevens

Case opinions
- Majority: Brennan, joined by Burger, Stewart, White, Marshall, Blackmun
- Concur/dissent: Powell
- Dissent: Stevens
- Rehnquist took no part in the consideration or decision of the case.

Minnesota v. Clover Leaf Creamery Co., 449 U.S. 456 (1981), was a United States Supreme Court case which found no violation of the equal protection or commerce clauses in a Minnesota state statute banning retail sale of milk in plastic nonreturnable, nonrefillable containers, but permitting such sale in other nonreturnable, nonrefillable containers.

== Background ==
=== Facts ===
Minn. Stat. §116F.21 (1978) banned the retail sale of milk in plastic nonreturnable, nonrefillable containers, but permitted the sale of milk in other nonreturnable, nonrefillable containers, such as paperboard milk cartons. Respondent dairy contended that the statute violated the Equal Protection and Commerce Clauses.

=== Procedural history ===
After conducting extensive evidentiary hearings, the Minnesota court enjoined enforcement of the statute, finding that it violated the due process and equal protection clauses of the Fourteenth Amendment to the U.S. Constitution, due process provisions of the state constitution, and the commerce clause of the Federal Constitution (Art I, 8, cl 3). The Supreme Court of Minnesota affirmed on the federal equal protection and due process grounds, without reaching the commerce clause or state law issues, holding that the discrimination against plastic nonrefillables was not rationally related to the statute's stated objectives of promoting resource conservation, easing solid waste disposal problems, and conserving energy (289 NW2d 79).

=== Issues ===
The controversy centered on the narrow issue of whether the legislative classification between plastic and nonplastic, nonreturnable milk containers was rationally related to achievement of conservation.

== Opinion of the court ==
On certiorari, the United States Supreme Court (Brennan, J.) reversed.

Because the question was at least debatable, the state supreme court erred in substituting its judgment for the legislature's. The Court sustained §116F.21 under the Equal Protection Clause, concluding that it was rationally related to the State's objectives. From there, it followed that §116F.21 did not violate the Fourteenth Amendment's Due Process Clause. As to the Commerce Clause, the Court found that §116F.21 did not discriminate between interstate and intrastate commerce. The controlling question was whether the incidental burden imposed on interstate commerce by §116F.21 was clearly excessive in relation to the local benefits. The statute's burden on interstate commerce was relatively minor, and there was a substantial State interest involved.

It was held that (1) the ban on plastic nonreturnable milk containers was rationally related to the achievement of legitimate state purposes and thus did not violate the equal protection or due process clauses of the Fourteenth Amendment, since the state legislature could rationally have decided that its ban on plastic nonreturnable milk jugs might foster greater use of environmentally desirable alternatives, even though another type of nonreturnable is permitted to continue in use, having concluded that nonreturnable, nonrefillable milk containers pose environmental hazards, it was not arbitrary or irrational to ban the most recent entry into the field while in effect "grandfathering" paperboard containers, and the legislature had concluded, on evidence sufficient to make the questions at least debatable, that the statute would help to conserve energy and ease the state's solid waste disposal problem, and (2) the statute did not violate the commerce clause, since it regulated even-handedly by prohibiting all milk retailers from selling their products in plastic, nonreturnable milk containers, without regard to whether the milk, the containers, or the sellers are from out of state, the burden imposed on interstate commerce was relatively minor and was not clearly excessive in light of the substantial state interest in promoting conservation of energy and other natural resources and easing solid waste disposal problems, and no approach with a lesser impact on interstate activities was available.

== Concurrence in part and dissent in part ==
Justice Lewis F. Powell Jr, concurring in part and dissenting in part, agreed with the disposition of the equal protection issue, but would have remanded the commerce clause issue for consideration by the Supreme Court of Minnesota.

== Dissent ==
Justice John Paul Stevens dissented, expressing the views that (1) the Minnesota Supreme Court applied the correct legal standard in resolving the equal protection issue and that its factual findings, although contrary to the legislature's, should not have been disturbed, (2) the commerce clause issue should have been remanded to the Minnesota Supreme Court, and (3) having reached the commerce clause issue, the state trial court's factual findings should have been accepted in resolving that issue.
