= Estes v. Texas =

- Supreme Court of the United States

Argued April 1, 1965 Decided June 7, 1965
- Full case name: Billy Sol Estes v. Texas
- Citations: 381 U.S. 532 (more) 85 S. Ct. 1628; 14 L. Ed. 2d 543

Holding
- The televising over petitioner's objections of the courtroom proceedings of petitioner's criminal trial, in which there was widespread public interest, was inherently invalid as infringing the fundamental right to a fair trial guaranteed by the Due Process Clause of the Fourteenth Amendment.

Court membership
- Chief Justice Earl Warren Associate Justices Hugo Black · William O. Douglas; Tom C. Clark · John M. Harlan II; William J. Brennan Jr. · Potter Stewart; Byron White · Arthur Goldberg

Case opinions
- Majority: Clark, joined by Warren, Douglas, Harlan, Goldberg
- Concurrence: Harlan
- Dissent: Stewart, joined by Black, Brennan, White
- Dissent: White, joined by Brennan
- Dissent: Brennan

Laws applied
- U.S. Const. Amend. XIV

Estes v. Texas, 381 U.S. 532 (1965), was a case in which the United States Supreme Court overturned the fraud conviction of petitioner Billy Sol Estes, holding that his Fourteenth Amendment due process rights had been violated by the publicity associated with the pretrial hearing, which had been carried live on both television and radio. News photography was permitted throughout the trial and parts of it were broadcast as well.

There was no doubt that the Court was displeased with the intensive pretrial and trial coverage, but its biggest concern was the presence of cameras at the two-day-long pretrial hearing. It included at least 12 still and television photographers, three microphones on the judge's bench, and several aimed at the jury's box and attorney's table. When it was time for the trial to be held, it was moved about 500 miles away and the judge had imposed rather severe restrictions on press coverage. However, the justices did mark the notion that cameras would return to courtrooms eventually:

It is said that the ever-advancing techniques of public communication and the adjustment of the public to its presence may bring about a change in the effect of telecasting upon the fairness of criminal trials. But we are not dealing here with future developments in the field of electronics. Our judgment cannot be rested on the hypothesis of tomorrow but must take the facts as they are presented today."

The Supreme Court ruled in Chandler v. Florida, 449 U.S. 560 (1981) that a state could allow the broadcast and still photography coverage of criminal trials.

== See also ==
- List of United States Supreme Court cases, volume 381
