= List of United States Supreme Court cases, volume 455 =

This is a list of all the United States Supreme Court cases from volume 455 of the United States Reports:

Case name	Citation	Date decided
Washington v. Chrisman	455 U.S. 1	1982
United States v. Vogel Fertilizer Co.	455 U.S. 16	1982
Cmty. Commc'n Co. v. Boulder	455 U.S. 40	1982
Municipalities may not allow monopolies under home rule and instead must rely on policies enacted at the state level.
Kaiser Steel Corp. v. Mullins	455 U.S. 72	1982
Princeton Univ. v. Schmid	455 U.S. 100	1982
Eddings v. Oklahoma	455 U.S. 104	1982
Common Cause v. Schmitt	455 U.S. 129	1982
Merrion v. Jicarilla Apache Tribe	455 U.S. 130	1982
In re R.M.J.	455 U.S. 191	1982
Smith v. Phillips	455 U.S. 209	1982
Tully v. Mobil Oil Corp.	455 U.S. 245	1982
United States v. Lee (1982)	455 U.S. 252	1982
Herweg v. Ray	455 U.S. 265	1982
City of Mesquite v. Aladdin's Castle, Inc.	455 U.S. 283	1982
Jewett v. Comm'r	455 U.S. 305	1982
Consol. Freightways Corp. v. Kassel	455 U.S. 329	1982
New England Power Co. v. New Hampshire	455 U.S. 331	1982
Baldrige v. Shapiro	455 U.S. 345	1982
Havens Realty Corp. v. Coleman	455 U.S. 363	1982
Zipes v. Trans World Airlines, Inc.	455 U.S. 385	1982
Searle & Co. v. Cohn	455 U.S. 404	1982
Logan v. Zimmerman Brush Co.	455 U.S. 422	1982
White v. N.H. Dept. of Employment Sec.	455 U.S. 445	1982
Ry. Labor Executives' Ass'n v. Gibbons	455 U.S. 457	1982
Murphy v. Hunt	455 U.S. 478	1982
Hoffman Estates v. The Flipside, Hoffman Estates, Inc.	455 U.S. 489	1982
Rose v. Lundy	455 U.S. 509	1982
Marine Bank v. Weaver	455 U.S. 551	1982
Mine Workers Health & Retirement Funds v. Robinson	455 U.S. 562	1982
Bread Political Action Comm. v. Fed. Election Comm'n	455 U.S. 577	1982
Wainwright v. Torna	455 U.S. 586	1982
Sumner v. Mata	455 U.S. 591	1982
Fletcher v. Weir	455 U.S. 603	1982
U.S. Industries/Fed. Sheet Metal, Inc. v. Director	455 U.S. 608	1982
Lane v. Williams	455 U.S. 624	1982
McElroy v. United States	455 U.S. 642	1982
AMA v. FTC	455 U.S. 676	1982
Transp. Union v. Long Island R.R. Co.	455 U.S. 678	1982
Underwriters Nat'l Assur. Co. v. N.C. Life & Accident & Health Ins. Guar. Ass'n	455 U.S. 691	1982
United States v. New Mexico	455 U.S. 720	1982
Santosky v. Kramer	455 U.S. 745	1982
Repub. Nat'l Comm. v. Burton	455 U.S. 1301	1982
Karcher v. Daggett	455 U.S. 1303	1982
