= Totality of the circumstances =

Refers to a method of analysis where decisions are based on all available information

In the law, the totality of the circumstances test refers to a method of analysis where decisions are based on all available information rather than bright-line rules. Under the totality of the circumstances test, courts focus "on all the circumstances of a particular case, rather than any one factor". In the United States, totality tests are used as a method of analysis in several different areas of the law. For example, in United States criminal law, a determination about reasonable suspicion or probable cause is based on a consideration of the totality of the circumstances.

== Description ==
Cathy E. Moore described the totality of the circumstances test as a "balancing approach" rather than a strict application of "analytical and evidentiary rules", and Michael Coenen wrote that a totality of the circumstances test is the "antithesis" of an "inflexible checklist". Likewise, Kit Kinports has described the totality of the circumstances test as an analytical framework where decision makers are not bound by "rigid" rules, but instead are free to consider a range of evidence when making decisions. John Barker Waite also contrasted the totality of the circumstances test against rigid rules; he wrote that a judge's determination about a defendant's guilt will always be based on their reactions "to the totality of the circumstances", and the basis for such determinations cannot be "reduced to rule".

== History ==
As early as 1937, the Supreme Court of the United States held that a totality test should be used to determine whether an individual qualifies as a "farmer" under United States bankruptcy law. In its 1983 decision in Illinois v. Gates, the Supreme Court held that the totality of the circumstances test should be used to assess whether an anonymous tip is sufficient to provide probable cause. Writing for a majority of the Court, Justice William Rehnquist explained that a totality test was superior to a bright line rule because magistrates would not be "restricted in their authority to make probable cause determinations". In its 2013 ruling in Florida v. Harris, the Supreme Court affirmed that "lower court judges must reject rigid rules, bright-line tests, and mechanistic inquiries in favor of a more flexible, all-things-considered approach." However, some scholars have suggested that the Supreme Court's recent rulings in Florida v. Harris and Prado Navarette v. California represent a departure from the Court's prior totality test jurisprudence by introducing "drug-dog and drunk-driving exceptions to the totality-of-the-circumstances approach."

== See also ==
- Aguilar–Spinelli test
- Illinois v. Wardlow
