= Dennis v. Sparks =

- Supreme Court of the United States

Argued October 8, 1980 Decided November 17, 1980
- Full case name: Dennis v. Sparks ET AL., DBA Sidney A. Sparks, Trustee
- Citations: 449 U.S. 24 (more) 101 S. Ct. 183; 66 L. Ed. 2d 185; 1980 U.S. LEXIS 9

Case history
- Prior: Sparks v. Duval County Ranch Co., 604 F.2d 976 (5th Cir. 1979); cert. granted, 445 U.S. 942 (1980).

Holding
- The action against the private parties accused of conspiring with the judge is not subject to dismissal. Private persons, jointly engaged with state officials in a challenged action, are acting "under color" of law for purposes of 1983 actions. And the judge's immunity from damages liability for an official act that was allegedly the product of a corrupt conspiracy involving bribery of the judge does not change the character of his action or that of his co-conspirators. Historically at common law, judicial immunity does not insulate from damages liability those private persons who corruptly conspire with a judge. Nor has the doctrine of judicial immunity been considered historically as excusing a judge from responding as a witness when his co-conspirators are sued, even though a charge of conspiracy and judicial corruption will be aired and decided. Gravel v. United States distinguished. The potential harm to the public from denying immunity to co-conspirators if the factfinder mistakenly upholds a charge of a corrupt conspiracy is outweighed by the benefits of providing a remedy [449 U.S. 24, 25] against those private persons who participate in subverting the judicial process and in so doing inflict injury on other persons. pp. 27–32.

Court membership
- Chief Justice Warren E. Burger Associate Justices William J. Brennan Jr. · Potter Stewart; Byron White · Thurgood Marshall; Harry Blackmun · Lewis F. Powell Jr. William Rehnquist · John P. Stevens

Case opinion
- Majority: White, joined by unanimous

Dennis v. Sparks, 449 U.S. 24 (1980), was a case in which the Supreme Court of the United States held that individuals who bribed a judge for an injunction were not protected by judicial immunity and therefore could be held liable for the damages resulting from the injunction.

== The case ==
In January 1973, a judge of the 229th District Court of Duval County, Tex., enjoined the production of minerals from certain oil leases owned by respondents. In June 1975, the injunction was dissolved by an appellate court as having been illegally issued. Respondents then filed a complaint in the United States District Court purporting to state a cause of action for damages under 42 U.S.C. § 1983. Defendants were the Duval County Ranch Co., Inc., which had obtained the injunction, the sole owner of the corporation, the judge who entered the injunction, and the two individual sureties on the injunction bond, one of whom is now petitioner in this Court. Essentially, the claim was that the injunction had been corruptly issued as the result of a conspiracy between the judge and the other defendants, thus causing a deprivation of property, i.e., two years of oil production, without due process of law.

All defendants moved to dismiss, the judge asserting judicial immunity and the other defendants urging dismissal for failure to allege action "under color" of state law, a necessary component of a § 1983 cause of action. The District Court concluded that, because the injunction was a judicial act within the jurisdiction of the state court, the judge was immune from liability in a § 1983 suit, whether or not the injunction had issued as the result of a corrupt conspiracy. Relying on Haldane v. Chagnon, the District Court also ruled that, with the dismissal of the judge, the remaining defendants could not be said to have conspired under color of state law within the meaning of § 1983. The action against them was accordingly dismissed "for failure to state a claim upon which relief can be granted."

In a per curiam opinion, a panel of the Court of Appeals for the Fifth Circuit affirmed, agreeing that the judge was immune from suit and that, because "the remaining defendants, who are all private citizens, did not conspire with any person against whom a valid § 1983 suit can be stated," existing authorities in the Circuit required dismissal of the claims against these defendants as well. The case was reconsidered en banc, prior Circuit authority was overruled and the District Court judgment was reversed insofar as it had dismissed claims against the defendants other than the judge. The court ruled that there was no good reason in law, logic, or policy for conferring immunity on private persons who persuaded the immune judge to exercise his jurisdiction corruptly. Because the judgment below was inconsistent with the rulings of other Courts of Appeals and involves an important issue, the Supreme Court granted the petition for certiorari.

== Trivia ==
Dennis v. Sparks was the first opinion of the Court since the early 19th century where members of the Court were not referred to as "Mr. Justice." In February 1979, Justice John Paul Stevens participated in a moot court at the University of Notre Dame. Joining him on the bench were two lower court judges, including Judge Cornelia G. Kennedy, then chief judge of the U.S. District Court for the Eastern District of Michigan. As was custom, the arguing counsel addressed him as “Mr. Justice” Stevens. When participants addressed Judge Kennedy as “Madame Justice,” she replied, “Why do you address me as ‘Madame Justice?’ The word ‘Justice’ is not a sexist term.” Justice Stevens later discussed this with his all-male colleagues. Justice Potter Stewart observed that women would inevitably join them on the Court someday, and thus suggested that they drop “Mr.” from the title. On November 14, 1980, the Justices agreed by a vote of 8-1. The lone dissenter was Justice Harry A. Blackmun, who felt they should wait until a woman joined the Court so she could participate in the decision. The following year, Sandra Day O'Connor became the first woman nominated and the first confirmed to the Court.

== See also ==
- List of United States Supreme Court cases, volume 449
