= Smith v. Phillips =

- Supreme Court of the United States

Argued November 9, 1981 Decided January 25, 1982
- Full case name: Harold J. Smith, Superintendent, Attica Correctional Facility v. William R. Phillips
- Citations: 455 U.S. 209 (more) 102 S.Ct. 940, 71 L.Ed.2d 78
- Argument: Oral argument
- Opinion announcement: Opinion announcement

Case history
- Prior: Petition for a writ of habeas corpus granted, 485 F. Supp. 1365 (S.D.N.Y. 1980), affirmed, 632 F.2d 1019 (CA2 1980), certiorari granted, 450 U.S. 909 (1981)

Holding
- A criminal defendant is not denied due process of law when one of their jurors previously applied to work for the prosecutor's office or by the prosecutors' failure to disclose that fact.

Court membership
- Chief Justice Warren E. Burger Associate Justices William J. Brennan Jr. · Byron White; Thurgood Marshall · Harry Blackmun; Lewis F. Powell Jr. · William Rehnquist; John P. Stevens · Sandra Day O'Connor

Case opinions
- Majority: Rehnquist, joined by Burger, White, Blackmun, Powell, O'Connor
- Concurrence: O'Connor
- Dissent: Marshall, joined by Brennan, Stevens

Smith v. Phillips, 455 U.S. 209 (1982), was a United States Supreme Court case concerning bias in jury selection for criminal trials. The Court held that the fact that one of the jurors in a murder trial had applied to work for the prosecutor did not violate the defendant's constitutional right to a fair jury trial. The Court also held that the prosecution's failure to disclose this job application until after the trial was over did not violate the defendant's constitutional right to due process of law under the Due Process Clause of the Fourteenth Amendment. Accordingly, the Court reversed the decision of the lower courts to grant habeas corpus relief to the respondent, William R. Phillips, who had been convicted of murder in a New York trial court. In the majority opinion, Justice William Rehnquist wrote, "Due process does not require a new trial every time a juror has been placed in a compromising situation."
