= Colorado v. Bannister =

- Supreme Court of the United States

Decided October 20, 1980
- Full case name: Colorado v. Bannister
- Citations: 449 U.S. 1 (more) 101 S. Ct. 42; 66 L. Ed. 2d 1; 1980 U.S. LEXIS 151

Case history
- Prior: People v. Bannister, 607 P.2d 987 (Colo. 1980)
- Subsequent: On remand, People v. Bannister, 619 P.2d 71 (Colo. 1980)

Holding
- It does not violate the Fourth Amendment for a police officer to seize otherwise innocent-appearing objects in plain view when the officer has probable cause to believe that the objects are evidence or proceeds of a crime.

Court membership
- Chief Justice Warren E. Burger Associate Justices William J. Brennan Jr. · Potter Stewart; Byron White · Thurgood Marshall; Harry Blackmun · Lewis F. Powell Jr. William Rehnquist · John P. Stevens

Case opinion
- Per curiam

Laws applied
- U.S. Const. amend. IV

Colorado v. Bannister, 449 U.S. 1 (1980), is a U.S. Supreme Court case concerning the automobile exception to constitutional protections against searches and seizures.

== Facts ==
In the early morning hours of October 15, 1979, a Colorado Springs Police Officer observed a blue 1967 Pontiac GTO automobile moving along a road at a speed above the legal limit. The vehicle disappeared from the Officer's sight before he could stop the vehicle. Shortly thereafter, the officer heard a police radio dispatch reporting that a theft of motor vehicle parts had occurred in the area he was patrolling in his car. The radio dispatch announced that a number of chrome lug nuts were among the items stolen, and provided a description of two suspects. A few minutes later, the officer spotted the same automobile still speeding. He saw the car enter a service station, and followed it there for the purpose of issuing a traffic citation to its driver.

Upon approach of the car, both of its occupants exited. The officer observed chrome lug nuts in an open glove compartment located between the vehicle's front bucket seats, as well as two lug wrenches on the floorboard of the back seat. These items were in plain view, illuminated by the lights of the service station. Because the respondent and his companion fit the description of those suspected of stealing motor vehicle parts, the officer immediately arrested both of them. He then seized the lug nuts and wrenches from their automobile.

=== Procedural history ===
Prior to trial, Bannister moved to suppress the contraband seized by the arresting officer. The trial court granted the motion, the Supreme Court of Colorado affirmed. The State subsequently filed a petition for certiorari in the United States Supreme Court.

== Opinion of the Court ==
In a per curiam opinion, the Court held that the circumstances provided not only probable cause to arrest, but also under Carroll v. United States, 267 U.S. 132 (1925) and Chambers v. Maroney, 399 U.S. 42 (1970), probable cause to seize the incriminating items without a warrant.

First, the stop of the Defendants was justified because the officer observed the occupants of the vehicle breaking the traffic laws. The seizure of the Defendants became proper when, upon approach and after hearing the description of the vehicle and the defendants on the flash call, the officer had probable cause to make the arrest.

Finally, the seizure of the items was lawful because they were in plain view. Notwithstanding the fact that these items were ordinary and not necessarily incriminating as contraband, the fact that the car and defendants fit the description broadcast on the flash call, coupled with the fact that they were suspected of stealing auto parts, justified the warrantless seizure of the items.
