= United States Railroad Retirement Board v. Fritz =

- Supreme Court of the United States

Argued October 6, 1980 Decided December 9, 1980
- Full case name: United States Railroad Retirement Board v. Fritz
- Docket no.: 79-870
- Citations: 449 U.S. 166 (more)
- Argument: Oral argument
- Opinion announcement: Opinion announcement

Holding
- The challenged provisions of the 1974 Act do not deny the plaintiff class equal protection of the laws guaranteed by the Fifth Amendment.

Court membership
- Chief Justice Warren E. Burger Associate Justices William J. Brennan Jr. · Potter Stewart; Byron White · Thurgood Marshall; Harry Blackmun · Lewis F. Powell Jr. William Rehnquist · John P. Stevens

Case opinions
- Majority: Rehnquist, joined by Burger, Stewart, White, Blackmun, Powell
- Concurrence: Stevens
- Dissent: Brennan, joined by Marshall

Laws applied
- U.S. Const. amend. V

Seal of the US Railroad Retirement Board

U.S. Railroad Retirement Board v. Fritz 449 U.S. 166 (1980) is an appeal case focusing on cementing specific qualifications for retired railroad employees to receive dual retirement benefits. The Railroad Retirement Board supports the interest of the railroad system in upholding the Railroad Retirement Act of 1974. The unconstitutionality of the 1974 act is the primary argument used against the board.

The act was created following the realization that the U.S. railroad system was facing an eventual bankruptcy, the bankruptcy resulting from how retirement benefits had previously been provided to employees. The new standards limit who qualifies for retirement benefits by requiring either a specific amount of time served at the railroad or requiring an individual to have been working at or connected to the railroad at a specified period of time.

Following this appeal, the judgment from the Supreme Court of the United States maintains the qualifications required for retired and yet to retire employees newly established by the 1974 act.

== The original case and its appeal ==
In the original case, the Railroad Retirement Board acted as the defendant. Following the judgment from the District Court for the Southern District of Indiana, the board appeals the case to the Supreme Court. The appellant Retirement Board argues for maintaining restrictions on who qualifies for dual retirement benefits. Fritz’ argument as the appellee focuses on the Railroad Retirement Act of 1974 and how it is unconstitutional. The unconstitutionality is argued based on what the act establishes as qualifications for receiving retirement benefits.

== Railroad Retirement Act of 1974 ==
Enacted by Congress, the Railroad Retirement Act of 1974 moves away from the functionality of its predecessor act established in 1937. The 1937 act allowed for railroad employees to receive retirement benefits from the railroad, social security benefits, and benefits from an additional source labelled "windfall." The new act in 1974 would establish specific qualifications for employees to receive the windfall benefits. The groups who were to receive the benefits were those who had already retired and qualified as well as those who had yet to retire but already achieved the qualifications prior to January 1, 1975.

=== Qualifications for Windfall Benefits ===
To start, employees who had already retired and were receiving windfall benefits would maintain their retirement benefits. Employees who had not yet retired could still qualify for the dual benefits through three other methods. First, an employee could have done some railroad work during the year 1974. Second, as of December 31, 1974, or a later retirement date they would need a current connection to the railroad. Lastly, employees who had 25 years’ experience with the railroad by December 31, 1974, also qualified for the windfall benefits.

== Arguments ==
Argued on October 6, 1980, the appellee's point is made by focusing on how the groups were made in an irrational manner. The complaint has a basis in the Due Process Clause of the Fifth Amendment. It is pointed out how particular it is that a person with between 10 and 25 years of railroad experience may not qualify for the benefits if his connection to the railroad is not timed right.

== Decision ==
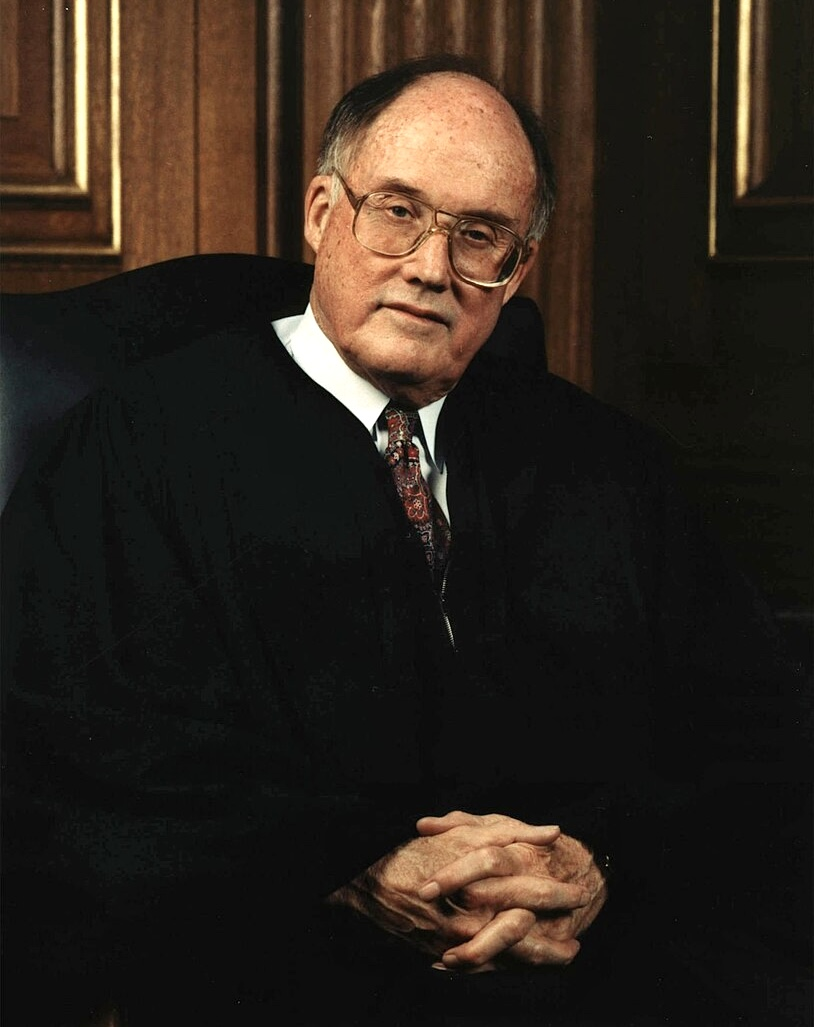
Justice Rehnquist delivered the court's opinion.

On December 9, 1980, the appeal judgment was given. On the appeal it was found that retired employees would be considered under the qualifications as found in the 1974 act. In giving out this judgment it was described that although the qualifications might be peculiar or very particular it does not make them unconstitutional.

=== Opinions ===
In dissent, Justices Brennan and Marshall argued that the dual benefit system was created intentionally by congress to avoid the loss of benefits accrued by employees in a railroad position prior to 1974; this was shown using contemporary comments from Representatives. They further argued that it was inequitable to remove benefits from workers who had planned their career and retirement decisions around a legal framework that was clear and in unchallenged effect.

== Impact and significance of the case ==
The outcome of this case ensured the railroad system would not face bankruptcy while establishing a consistent standard for retiring railroad employees. Other organizations face similar situations in regard to dual benefits, but the railroad system differs in its structure. An example of these other organizations is the United States Army, and the main difference is that those people are classified as government employees. In the railroad system the government is involving itself in the private sector, so railroad employees are not employed by the government.
