= United States v. DiFrancesco =

- Supreme Court of the United States

Argued October 6, 1980 Decided December 9, 1980
- Full case name: United States v. DiFrancesco
- Citations: 449 U.S. 117 (more)
- Argument: Oral argument
- Opinion announcement: Opinion announcement

Case history
- Prior: 604 F.2d 769 (CA2 1979)

Holding
- The Organized Crime Control Act of 1970 does not violate the Double Jeopardy Clause of the Fifth Amendment. United States Court of Appeals for the Second Circuit reversed and remanded.

Court membership
- Chief Justice Warren E. Burger Associate Justices William J. Brennan Jr. · Potter Stewart; Byron White · Thurgood Marshall; Harry Blackmun · Lewis F. Powell Jr. William Rehnquist · John P. Stevens

Case opinions
- Majority: Blackmun, joined by Burger, Stewart, Powell, Rehnquist
- Dissent: Brennan, joined by White, Marshall, Stevens
- Dissent: Stevens

United States v. DiFrancesco, 449 U.S. 117 (1980), was a United States Supreme Court case decided in 1980. In a five-to-four decision, the Court held that a provision of the Organized Crime Control Act of 1970, which allows the federal government to appeal certain criminal sentences after they are imposed, did not violate the Double Jeopardy Clause of the Fifth Amendment to the United States Constitution. Though such an appeal could potentially lead to the defendant's sentence being lengthened, the Court concluded that because "the Double Jeopardy Clause does not require that a sentence be given a degree of finality that prevents its later increase", this practice did not violate the Double Jeopardy Clause.
