= United States v. Will =

- Supreme Court of the United States

Decided December 15, 1980
- Full case name: United States v. Will
- Citations: 449 U.S. 200 (more)

Holding
- Congress can repeal or modify a statutorily defined formula for annual cost-of-living increases to the compensation of federal judges, but Congress must act with respect to any particular increase before the increase takes effect.

Court membership
- Chief Justice Warren E. Burger Associate Justices William J. Brennan Jr. · Potter Stewart; Byron White · Thurgood Marshall; Harry Blackmun · Lewis F. Powell Jr. William Rehnquist · John P. Stevens

Case opinion
- Majority: Burger, joined by unanimous
- Blackmun took no part in the consideration or decision of the case.

Laws applied
- Compensation Clause

United States v. Will, 449 U.S. 200 (1980), was a United States Supreme Court case in which the court held that Congress can repeal or modify a statutorily defined formula for annual cost-of-living increases to the compensation of federal judges, but Congress must act with respect to any particular increase before the increase takes effect.

== Background ==
An interlocking network of federal statutes fixes the compensation of high-level federal officials, including federal judges, and provides for annual cost-of-living adjustments in salary determined in the same way as those for federal employees generally. In four consecutive fiscal years (hereafter Years 1, 2, 3, and 4), Congress, with respect to these high-level officials, enacted statutes to stop or reduce previously authorized cost-of-living increases initially intended to be automatically operative under that statutory scheme. In Years 2 and 3, the statutes became law before the start of the fiscal year, and in Years 1 and 4 became law on or after the first day of the fiscal year. A number of United States District Court judges filed class actions against the United States in District Court, challenging the validity of the statutes under the Compensation Clause of the Constitution, which provides that federal judges shall receive compensation which "shall not be diminished during their Continuance in Office." The federal District Court granted summary judgments for the judges.

== Opinion of the court ==
The Supreme Court issued an opinion on December 15, 1980. The case addressed the jurisdiction of the District Court judges deciding the cases about their own compensation before moving on to the substance of the Compensation Clause claim.
