= Billie Sol Estes =

American businessman and confidence swindler

- Estes in 1962
- Born: January 10, 1925; Near Clyde, Texas, U.S.
- Died: May 14, 2013 (aged 88); DeCordova, Texas, U.S.
- Occupation: Businessman
- Known for: Fraud; Connection to Lyndon Johnson
- Criminal charges: Swindling; Fraud; Interstate transportation of securities taken by fraud; Conspiracy; Mail fraud
- Criminal penalty: 8 years in prison for swindling, reversed; 15 years for mail fraud and conspiracy, served 7 years in Ft. Leavenworth
- Awards: One of America's 10 Outstanding Young Men of 1953, United States Junior Chamber of Commerce

Billie Sol Estes (January 10, 1925 – May 14, 2013) was an American businessman and financier best known for his involvement in a business fraud scandal that complicated his ties to friend and future U.S. President Lyndon Johnson.

== Early life ==
Estes was born January 10, 1925, to John and Lillian Estes on a farm near Clyde, Texas, one of six children. Estes never attended college but nonetheless demonstrated a natural talent for business from an early age.

At 13, [Estes] received a lamb as a gift, sold its wool for $5, bought another lamb and went into business. At 15, he sold 100 sheep for $3,000. He borrowed $3,500 more from a bank, bought government surplus grain and sold it for a big profit. By 18, he had $38,000.

He served in the U.S. Merchant Marine during World War II.

== Fraud schemes ==
In the late 1950s, Estes was heavily involved in the Texas anhydrous ammonia business. He produced mortgages on nonexistent ammonia tanks by convincing local farmers to purchase them on credit, sight unseen, and leasing them from the farmers for the same amount as the mortgage payment, paying them a convenience fee as well. He used the fraudulent mortgage holdings to obtain loans from banks outside Texas who were unable to easily check on the tanks.

At the same time, United States Department of Agriculture began controlling the price of cotton, specifying quotas to farmers. The program included an acreage allotment that normally was not transferable from the land it was associated with, but which could be transferred if the original land was taken by eminent domain.

Estes worked out a method to purchase large numbers of cotton allotments by dealing with farmers who had been dispossessed of land through eminent domain. He convinced the farmers to purchase land from him in Texas and transfer their allotments there, with a mortgage agreement delaying the first payment for a year. Then he would lease the land and allotments back from the farmer for $50 per acre. Once the first payment came due, the farmer would intentionally default and the land would revert to Estes; in effect, Estes had purchased the cotton allotments with the lease fees. However, because the original sale and mortgage were a pretext rather than a genuine sale, it was illegal to transfer the cotton allotments this way. Estes, however, was a smooth talker who was well-respected among his fellow members of the Churches of Christ.

In 1962, after information came to light that Estes had paid off four Agriculture officials for grain storage contracts, President John F. Kennedy ordered the Justice Department and FBI to open investigations into Estes' activities and determine if Secretary of Agriculture Orville L. Freeman had also been "compromised" (Freeman was cleared). Congress conducted hearings on Estes' business dealings, including some that led to Vice President Johnson, a long-time associate of Estes.

In May 1962, Estes was featured on the cover of Time magazine, which called him "a bundle of contradictions and paradoxes who makes Dr. Jekyll seem almost wholesome." The magazine noted that "He considered dancing immoral, often delivered sermons as a Church of Christ lay preacher. But he ruthlessly ruined business competitors, practiced fraud and deceit on a massive scale, and even victimized Church of Christ schools that he was supposed to be helping as a fund raiser or financial adviser."

In 1963 Estes was tried and convicted on charges related to the fraudulent ammonia tank mortgages on both federal and state charges and was sentenced to 24 years in prison. His state conviction was later overturned by the United States Supreme Court in Estes v. Texas, 381 U.S. 532 (1965). His appeal hinged upon the alleged impossibility of a fair trial due to the presence of television cameras and broadcast journalists in the courtroom. He prevailed by a 5–4 vote. Estes was paroled in 1971. Eight years later, he was convicted of other fraud charges and served four more years.

Oscar Griffin Jr., the journalist who uncovered the storage tank scandal, later received the 1963 Pulitzer Prize for his articles for a weekly newspaper in Pecos, Texas. To improve his 1961 candidacy for Reeves County school board, Estes offered the local newspaper large advertising buys in exchange for not opposing him. The Pecos Independent responded with an editorial that said, "We will put our advertising columns up for sale, as will any other newspaper, but we WILL NOT sell our editorial support." In response, Estes launched the rival Pecos Daily News on August 1, 1961. He spent about $600,000 and the Independent lost $400,000. It was nearly bankrupt when Griffin, its editor, ran (February 12, 1962) the first of four articles describing Estes's fraud but without naming him. Estes was arrested ten days after the last article ran in March. After his arrest, the Daily News went into receivership and the Independent bought it and merged the two newspapers into the Pecos Enterprise. When Griffin died in 2011, Estes remarked, "It's a good riddance that he left this world."

Estes’ schemes were parodied in 1963 by Allan Sherman in the song "Shticks of One and a Half a Dozen of the Other", on his album, My Son, the Celebrity.

== Relationship with Lyndon Johnson ==
Eight days before being sworn in as Vice-President of the United States in 1961, Lyndon B. Johnson wrote to Estes, thanking him for the gift of some roses, writing, "It's wonderful to have friends like you."

After the 1961 inauguration, Estes received an invitation from Cliff Carter, a Johnson aide. "Call me in the Vice-President's office as we can serve you." The Pecos Daily News pictured Estes chatting with the Vice-President's daughter during inauguration week.

On March 28, 1962, during the leases scandal, Estes sought the advice of Frank Cain, an attorney for the Pacific Finance Corporation, one of the institutions to which Estes was in debt. Cain told Holland McCombs, a journalist, that Estes made calls to Lyndon Johnson's Washington office while he was being investigated by federal and state agencies, saying he would have Johnson stop the investigation. "I'll get ahold of Lyndon and get him to call it off," Estes said. By "it." he meant the investigation. Estes contributed large amounts to Johnson's various campaigns for office, but some say that Johnson barely knew Estes, and that Estes was merely a name-dropper.

== Allegations linking Johnson to the assassination of Kennedy and others ==
Estes alleged in the 1980s that he had inside knowledge that Johnson was involved in the assassination of Kennedy. In 1984, he provided a voluntary statement to a grand jury in Texas alleging that the homicide of Henry Marshall, a key investigator in the Department of Agriculture case, was perpetrated by Malcolm Wallace, an aide to Johnson, upon orders from the then-Vice President. Estes claimed that Johnson was involved in the fraud schemes and had the official killed to prevent him from exposing Johnson's role. Two former Johnson associates responded to the allegations stating Estes was a "pathological liar". When the Department of Justice asked for more information, Estes responded that he would provide information on eight other murders ordered by Johnson, including the assassination of Kennedy, in exchange for immunity from prosecution and a pardon. According to Estes, Johnson set up the assassination to become president.

Estes reiterated the claim in JFK Le Dernier Témoin: Assassinat de Kennedy, Enfin La Vérité! ("JFK The Last Witness: Kennedy's Assassination, Finally The Truth!"), a book he co-wrote with a French writer in 2003. He said that he was not interested in writing the book—published only in France—but that he was offered "a few hundred thousand dollars" to contribute to it. According to the Associated Press, the allegation was "rejected by prominent historians, Johnson aides and family members."

== Death ==
Estes died at his home in DeCordova, Texas, on May 14, 2013, at the age of 88.
