= Chandler v. Florida =

- Supreme Court of the United States

Argued November 12, 1980 Decided January 26, 1981
- Full case name: Chandler v. Florida
- Citations: 449 U.S. 560 (more) 101 S. Ct. 802; 66 L. Ed. 2d 740

Holding
- The Constitution does not prohibit a state from experimenting with a program such as is authorized by Florida's Canon 3A (7).

Court membership
- Chief Justice Warren E. Burger Associate Justices William J. Brennan Jr. · Potter Stewart; Byron White · Thurgood Marshall; Harry Blackmun · Lewis F. Powell Jr. William Rehnquist · John P. Stevens

Case opinions
- Majority: Burger, joined by Brennan, Marshall, Blackmun, Powell, Rehnquist
- Concurrence: Stewart
- Concurrence: White
- Stevens took no part in the consideration or decision of the case.

Chandler v. Florida, 449 U.S. 560 (1981), was a legal case in which the Supreme Court of the United States held that a state could allow the broadcast and still photography coverage of criminal trials. While refraining from formally overruling Estes v. Texas, which in 1965 held that media coverage was "infringing the fundamental right to a fair trial guaranteed by the Due Process Clause of the Fourteenth Amendment," it effectively did so.

== Background ==
After the media was allowed to televise a portion of their case, two Miami Beach police officers filed suit objecting to the coverage case. The two police officers were charged with burglarizing a Miami Beach restaurant.

== Question Before the Court ==
Does media coverage of a criminal's trial violate the accused right to a fair trial protected by the Sixth and Fourteenth Amendments?

== Decision of the Court ==
In an 8-0 decision in favor of the State of Florida, Chief Justice Burger wrote the opinion for the Supreme Court. Citing Estes v. Texas (1964), the Court denied Chandler's claim that a media presence in the courtroom is offensive to due process. So long as the "evolving technology" does not infringe on "fundamental guarantees" of the accused, the media does not violate a person's constitutional right to due process. Further, the Court noted that the previous statute upheld by the Florida State Supreme Court implemented strict guidelines "intended to protect the right of a defendant to a fair trial" in regards to the medias coverage of a criminal trial.

== See also ==
- List of United States Supreme Court cases, volume 449
