= Aguilar v. Texas =

- Supreme Court of the United States

Argued March 25–26, 1964 Decided June 15, 1964
- Full case name: Aguilar v. Texas
- Citations: 378 U.S. 108 (more) 84 S. Ct. 1509; 12 L. Ed. 2d 723

Case history
- Prior: Certiorari to the Court of Criminal Appeals of Texas

Holding
- The magistrate must be informed of some of the underlying circumstances relied on by the person providing the information and some of the underlying circumstances from which the affiant concluded that the informant, whose identity was not disclosed, was credible or his information reliable.

Court membership
- Chief Justice Earl Warren Associate Justices Hugo Black · William O. Douglas; Tom C. Clark · John M. Harlan II; William J. Brennan Jr. · Potter Stewart; Byron White · Arthur Goldberg

Case opinions
- Majority: Goldberg, joined by Warren, Douglas, Brennan, White
- Concurrence: Harlan
- Dissent: Clark, joined by Black, Stewart

Laws applied
- U.S. Const. amends. IV, XIV
- Overruled by
- Illinois v. Gates (1983, in part)

Aguilar v. Texas, 378 U.S. 108 (1964), was a decision by the United States Supreme Court, which held that "[a]lthough an affidavit supporting a search warrant may be based on hearsay information and need not reflect the direct personal observations of the affiant, the magistrate must be informed of some of the underlying circumstances relied on by the person providing the information and some of the underlying circumstances from which the affiant concluded that the informant, whose identity was not disclosed, was credible or his information reliable." Along with Spinelli v. United States (1969), Aguilar established the Aguilar–Spinelli test, a judicial guideline for evaluating the validity of a search warrant based on information provided by a confidential informant or an anonymous tip. The test developed in this case was subsequently rejected and replaced in Illinois v. Gates, 462 U.S. 213 (1983).

== Background ==
On or about January 1, 1960, two Houston Police Department officers placed Aguilar's residence under surveillance. On January 8, 1960, the officers applied for a warrant to search the premises. The officers believed Aguilar possessed narcotics intended for sale, and further alleged corroboration by "reliable information from a credible person". The police executed the search warrant and announced at the residence door that they were police with a warrant. After hearing commotion in the house the police forced entry, seized Aguilar, and recovered a bag of narcotics he attempted to flush down the drain.

At his trial in the state court, Aguilar objected to the inclusion of evidence obtained as a result of the search warrant. Aguilar argued that the affidavit backing the search warrant was "nothing more than hearsay." The state court held the affidavit sufficient to admit the evidence, leading to Aguilar's conviction for illegal possession of heroin. On appeal, the Texas Court of Criminal Appeals affirmed the conviction. Aguilar then petitioned the Supreme Court and his petition was granted.

== Majority Opinions ==
Justice Goldberg delivered the opinion of the court which held that "[t]he standard of reasonableness for obtaining a search warrant is the same under the Fourth and the Fourteenth Amendments", citing Ker v. California, 374 U.S. 23 (U.S. 1963). The court also held that "[a]lthough an affidavit supporting a search warrant may be based on hearsay information and need not reflect the direct personal observations of the affiant, the magistrate must be informed of some of the underlying circumstances relied on by the person providing the information and some of the underlying circumstances from which the affiant concluded that the informant, whose identity was not disclosed, was credible or his information reliable", citing Giordenello v. United States, 357 U.S. 480 (U.S. 1958).

Justice Harlan concurred.

== Dissenting Opinions ==
Justice Clark dissented, joined by Justice Black and Justice Stewart. The dissent argued that "[t]he Court holds the affidavit insufficient and sets aside the conviction on the basis of two cases, neither of which is controlling."

== See also ==
- List of United States Supreme Court cases, volume 378
- Illinois v. Gates (1983)
