= Sumner v. Mata =

- Supreme Court of the United States

Argued December 9, 1980 Decided January 21, 1981
- Full case name: Sumner v. Mata
- Citations: 449 U.S. 539 (more)

Court membership
- Chief Justice Warren E. Burger Associate Justices William J. Brennan Jr. · Potter Stewart; Byron White · Thurgood Marshall; Harry Blackmun · Lewis F. Powell Jr. William Rehnquist · John P. Stevens

Case opinions
- Majority: Rehnquist, joined by Burger, Stewart, White, Powell
- Concurrence: Blackmun
- Dissent: Brennan, joined by Marshall, Stevens

Sumner v. Mata, 449 U.S. 539, was a United States Supreme Court case that limited the jurisdiction of federal courts to review state court factual determinations under 28 USC § 2254(e). Writing for the majority, Justice William Rehnquist asserted the "interest in federalism recognized by Congress" in the habeas statute. Rehnquist's decision in Mata marked a turning point for federal habeas review.

== Case history ==
In 1973, while already incarcerated in a California prison, Mata was convicted of murdering another inmate at the prison. Three witnesses testified against Mata. Two were shown photo identification arrays.

Mata said the photographic identification procedure used by state police was "impermissibly suggestive" according to Simmons v. United States. The California Court of Appeal rejected Mata's claim finding, inter alia, that the witnesses had an adequate opportunity to view the crime and that their descriptions were accurate. After he was denied post-conviction relief in the state courts, Mata petitioned the federal district court for habeas corpus including the pre-trial identification issue. On May 23, 1978, the district court denied the petition. Mata appealed to the Ninth Circuit Court of Appeals. The Ninth Circuit decided that the photographic identification procedure was "so impermissibly suggestive as to give rise to a very substantial likelihood of irreperable misidentification". The Ninth Circuit said the witnesses were pressured by prison factions, the descriptions they provided were lacking in detail and the circumstances generally presented a risk of misidentification.

== Supreme Court ==
Wriing for the majority, Justice William Rehnquist said the case was about federalism and the limits of federal habeas jurisdiction. § 2254(d) (now section § 2254(e)) "requires deference by federal courts to factual determations of all state courts" including determinations made by the state appellate court:

This interest in federalism recognized by Congress in enacting §2254(d) requires deference by federal courts to factual determinations of all state courts.

The Ninth Circuit arrived at different findings than the state court on the same record. Rehquist said the Court of Appeals for the Ninth Circuit did not apply the "presumption of correctness".

== On remand ==
On remand, the Ninth Circuit said § 2254(e) did not apply to mixed questions of law and fact. The Supreme Court granted certitorari a second time and in a per curiam opinion stated that "the questions of fact that underlie [the question of the constitutionality of the pretrial identification procedures] are governed by the statutory presumption", although conceding that mixed questions of law and fact are not resolved by § 2254(e). On remand a second time, the Ninth Circuit held that the "presumption of correctness" did not apply because the state court findings in Mata's case were not supported by the record.
