= United States v. Brignoni-Ponce =

1975 US Supreme Court case

- Supreme Court of the United States

Argued February 18, 1975 Decided June 30, 1975
- Full case name: United States v. Brignoni-Ponce
- Citations: 422 U.S. 873 (more) 95 S. Ct. 2574; 45 L. Ed. 2d 607; 1975 U.S. LEXIS 10

Case history
- Prior: Certiorari to the United States Court of Appeals for the Ninth Circuit

Holding
- Border Patrol officers on roving patrols cannot stop a vehicle near border when the only ground for suspicion is that the occupants appear to be of Mexican ancestry.

Court membership
- Chief Justice Warren E. Burger Associate Justices William O. Douglas · William J. Brennan Jr. Potter Stewart · Byron White; Thurgood Marshall · Harry Blackmun; Lewis F. Powell Jr. · William Rehnquist

Case opinions
- Majority: Powell, joined by Brennan, Stewart, Marshall, Rehnquist
- Concurrence: Rehnquist
- Concurrence: Burger (in judgment), joined by Blackmun
- Concurrence: Douglas (in judgment)
- Concurrence: White (in judgment), joined by Blackmun

Laws applied
- U.S. Const. amend. IV

United States v. Brignoni-Ponce, 422 U.S. 873 (1975), was a case in which the Supreme Court determined it was a violation of the Fourth Amendment for a roving patrol car to stop a vehicle solely on the basis of the driver appearing to be of Mexican descent. A roving patrol car must have articulable facts that allow for an officer to have a reasonable suspicion that the person is carrying illegal aliens beyond their ethnicity. The Court handed down a 9–0 decision that affirmed the Circuit Court's ruling in the case. This case was also the final case that William O. Douglas presided on, as he retired shortly after this case, ending his record 36 years as an Associate Justice.

== Background ==
As part of normal procedure for the United States Border Patrol in Southern California there was a permanent traffic checkpoint set up Interstate 5 just outside San Clemente, California. On March 11, 1973, the checkpoint had been closed because of inclement weather so the officers sat on the side of the highway in their vehicle with their headlights facing northbound traffic. They pursued a vehicle with three occupants in it, stating later that their only reason for pursuing the vehicle was because of the occupant's apparent Mexican ethnicity.

The officers questioned Felix Humberto Brignoni-Ponce and his two passengers about their citizenship and discovered that Brignoni-Ponce's two passengers had entered the country illegally. The officers proceeded to arrest the three individuals. The driver was charged with two counts of knowingly transporting illegal immigrants, a violation of § 274 (a) (2) of the Immigration and Nationality Act, 66 Stat. 228 and the two passengers were arrested for entering the country illegally.

At the trial for the defendant, he argued that the two passengers should not have to testify because their statements were the result of an illegal seizure, but his motion was denied. The two passengers testified and the defendant was found guilty of both counts. The defendant then appealed the decision saying that because the stop was based solely on the basis of his ethnicity, it was a violation of his Fourth Amendment rights. The Fourth Amendment protects a person from unreasonable search and seizures.

== Border Patrol's argument ==
The Border Patrol derived its power to stop the individuals from two separate laws. The first was Section 287 (a) (1) of the Immigration and Nationality Act, 8 U. S. C. § 1357 (a) (1), authorizes any officer or employee of the Immigration and Naturalization Service without a warrant, "to interrogate any alien or person believed to be an alien as to his right to be or to remain in the United States." The second was Section 287 (a) (3) of the Act, 8 U. S. C. § 1357 (a) (3), which authorizes agents, without a warrant, to search cars traveling near the border that are suspected to have or are transporting persons trying to enter the country illegally. From this, they believe that their actions were lawful even if an act of Congress cannot supersede the Constitution.

== Court's decision ==
The Court held a search and seizure based solely on the "appearance of Mexican ancestry" violates the Fourth Amendment. Without a reasonable suspicion generated by articulable facts, a police search is illegal.

According to the precedent set in Terry v. Ohio and Adams v. Williams, under appropriate circumstances, a roving patrol may perform a limited search and seizure without having probable cause to arrest the person. These circumstances include information that the person may have drugs or weapons, a visual scan of the person's vehicle reveals something suspicious or as in this case a visual reason to believe that the person is carrying illegal aliens into the country.

Valid examples of what constitutes as suspicion of carrying illegal aliens include driving a station wagon with fold down seats or spare tires removed to conceal aliens, having a low riding vehicle, having an overly packed vehicle, or driving erratically. Also, the officer's knowledge of the area, experience, and training in dealing with illegal aliens dictates the decision to pursue a search. Thus, an officer must have one of these articulable facts in order stop someone and question their citizenship.

However, in this case the defendants were stopped for one reason: solely on the basis of their appeared Mexican ancestry. The court concluded that this reason alone made the stop unreasonable. The lack of articulable facts to generate suspicion that the car was carrying illegal aliens meant that this search was illegal. There are millions of people living in the area around San Diego that are naturalized and native-born of Mexico and "even in the border area, a small proportion of them are aliens." It is unreasonable to assume that any person who appears Mexican is an illegal alien or could be transporting illegal aliens. To allow such unrestricted roving patrol stops would be to subject all residents of the border area to unreasonable searches and seizures just because of their ethnicity, therefore the stop of the defendant was a violation of the Fourth Amendment and the charges were dropped.

== History of Felix Humberto Brignoni-Ponce ==
Despite being freed from the charges in this case, Brignoni-Ponce was arrested for carrying illegal aliens five times in fifteen years, spending over three years in jail for his crimes. His last-known arrest was on February 25, 1981, six years after his Supreme Court case was decided, at a San Clemente checkpoint, for smuggling thirteen illegal aliens. Ironically, Brignoni-Ponce was born in Puerto Rico, not of Mexican descent as suspected in his initial stop by the Border Patrol, and is an American citizen. This case's effects on Border Patrol agents have been compared to the effects the Miranda decision had on attorneys and prosecutors.

== Relation to Vasquez Perdomo v. Noem ==
Brignoni-Ponce set the rule that apparent Mexican ancestry can be one of the factors in forming a reasonable suspicion for stopping a vehicle, but cannot be the sole basis for an immigration stop. In Noem v. Vasquez Perdomo, the Court, through Justice Kavanaugh's concurrence, agreed that apparent ethnicity alone cannot furnish reasonable suspicion for immigration stops, but it can be a relevant factor when considered along with other salient features. The Court agrees that (i) presence at particular locations such as bus stops, car washes, day laborer pickup sites, agricultural sites, and the like; (ii) the type of work one does; (iii) speaking Spanish or speaking English with an accent are all relevant factors that may be considered along with ethnicity.

Unlike in Vasquez-Perdomo, the Brignoni-Ponce case addresses the action that took place within 100 miles of the border by border patrol. The Brignoni-Ponce case dealt with profiling based solely on car passengers appearing Mexican while the Vasquez-Perdomo case deals with profiling based on 4 factors–race or ethnicity, speaking English with an accent, being in a particular place, and doing a particular type of job. This has meant the expansion of roving patrols beyond 100 miles of the border by border patrol, and may now enter American cities deeper in the country.

== Criticisms ==
The Brignoni-Ponce decision has been criticized for contributing to patterns of immigration enforcement that some view as discriminatory or racially biased. When Brignoni-Ponce was decided in 1975, Latinos made up roughly 5% of the U.S. population, rising to 19% by 2020. Further, it was also one of the fastest-growing groups in the U.S. Between 2010 and 2020.

In the 21st century the number of border patrol agents have continued to increase. In 2011, CBP employed more than double the number of agents compared to 2004. This increase in manpower has in turn allowed for the increase of roving patrols.

As discussed in Criminalizing Race: How Direct and Indirect Criminalization of Racial ‘Status’ Constitutes Cruel and Unusual Punishment, such practices may implicate the principles of the Robinson doctrine, under which the Supreme Court has held that individuals may be punished for what they do, but not for who they are.

Stop and search practices are now governed by the “totality of the circumstances” test, under which race or ethnicity may be considered a factor, but it cannot be the sole basis for reasonable suspicion. The ruling has been criticized for opening the door to racial bias in policing and enabling cases such as Noem v. Vasquez to challenge the use of ethic and racial profiling, even outside of border zones. This development has led to concerns about the ambiguous and arbitrary application of the “reasonable suspicion” standard, which remains inconsistently interpreted by courts, allowing for broad discretion and potential abuse by law enforcement. The American Civil Liberties Union defines racial profiling as “the discriminatory practice by law enforcement officials of targeting individuals for suspicion of crime based on the individual's race, ethnicity, religion, or national origin.” Such profiling raises constitutional concerns under both the Fourth and Fourteenth Amendments, especially when enforcement decisions rely on arbitrary or pretextual circumstances rather than articulable facts.

== See also ==
- Kavanaugh stop
