= List of United States Supreme Court cases, volume 449 =

This is a list of all the United States Supreme Court cases from volume 449 of the United States Reports:

Case name	Citation	Date decided
Colorado v. Bannister	449 U.S. 1	1980
Hughes v. Rowe	449 U.S. 5	1980
Dennis v. Sparks	449 U.S. 24	1980
Allied Chemical Corp. v. Daiflon, Inc.	449 U.S. 33	1980
Stone v. Graham	449 U.S. 39	1980
Wisconsin v. Illinois (1980)	449 U.S. 48	1980
County of Imperial v. Munoz	449 U.S. 54	1980
EPA v. National Crushed Stone Assn.	449 U.S. 64	1980
Pacileo v. Walker	449 U.S. 86	1980
Allen v. McCurry	449 U.S. 90	1980
United States v. DiFrancesco	449 U.S. 117	1980
Webb's Fabulous Pharmacies, Inc. v. Beckwith	449 U.S. 155	1980
United States Railroad Retirement Board v. Fritz	449 U.S. 166	December 9, 1980
Vincent v. Texas	449 U.S. 199	1980
United States v. Will	449 U.S. 200	1980
FTC v. Standard Oil Co. of Cal.	449 U.S. 232	1980
Delaware State College v. Ricks	449 U.S. 250	1980
Potomac Elec. Power Co. v. Director, Office of Workers' Compensation Programs	449 U.S. 268	December 15, 1980
United States v. Darusmont	449 U.S. 292	1981
Allstate Ins. Co. v. Hague	449 U.S. 302	1981
Watkins v. Sowders	449 U.S. 341	1981
United States v. Morrison	449 U.S. 361	1981
Firestone Tire & Rubber Co. v. Risjord	449 U.S. 368	1981
Upjohn Co. v. United States	449 U.S. 383	1981
Mariscal v. United States	449 U.S. 405	1981
United States v. California	449 U.S. 408	1981
United States v. Cortez	449 U.S. 411	1981
Rubin v. United States	449 U.S. 424	1981
Cuyler v. Adams	449 U.S. 433	1981
Minnesota v. Clover Leaf Creamery Co.	449 U.S. 456	1981
Fedorenko v. United States	449 U.S. 490	1981
Sumner v. Mata	449 U.S. 539	1981
Chandler v. Florida	449 U.S. 560	1981
EEOC v. Associated Dry Goods Corp.	449 U.S. 590	1981
Walter Fleisher Co. v. County of Los Angeles	449 U.S. 608	1981
Consolidated Rail Corporation v. National Assn. of Recycling Industries, Inc.	449 U.S. 609	1981
O'Connor v. Board of Ed. of School Dist. 23	449 U.S. 1301	1980
McCarthy v. Harper	449 U.S. 1309	1981
Atiyeh v. Capps	449 U.S. 1312	1981
California v. Riegler	449 U.S. 1319	1981
