= Navarette v. California =

- Supreme Court of the United States

Argued January 21, 2014 Decided April 22, 2014
- Full case name: Lorenzo Prado Navarette and Jose Prado Navarette, Petitioners v. California
- Docket no.: 12-9490
- Citations: 572 U.S. 393 (more) 134 S. Ct. 1683; 188 L. Ed. 2d 680; 2014 U.S. LEXIS 2930; 82 U.S.L.W. 4282; 24 Fla. L. Weekly Fed. S 690; 2014 WL 1577513

Case history
- Prior: On Writ of Certiorari to the Court of Appeal of California, First Appellate District, People v. Navarette, 2012 Cal. App. Unpub. LEXIS 7415 (Cal. Ct. App., Oct. 12, 2012), cert. denied People v. Navarette (Lorenzo Prado), 2013 Cal. LEXIS 141 (Cal., Jan. 3, 2013)

Holding
- When acting upon information provided by an anonymous tip, police officers need not personally verify the existence of ongoing criminal activity.

Court membership
- Chief Justice John Roberts Associate Justices Antonin Scalia · Anthony Kennedy; Clarence Thomas · Ruth Bader Ginsburg; Stephen Breyer · Samuel Alito; Sonia Sotomayor · Elena Kagan

Case opinions
- Majority: Thomas, joined by Roberts, Kennedy, Breyer, Alito
- Dissent: Scalia, joined by Ginsburg, Sotomayor, Kagan

Laws applied
- U.S. Const. amend. IV

Navarette v. California, 572 U.S. 393 (2014), was a case in which the United States Supreme Court clarified when police officers may make arrests or conduct temporary detentions based on information provided by anonymous tips. In 2008, police in California received a 911 call that a pickup truck was driving recklessly along a rural highway. Officers spotted a truck matching the description provided in the 911 call and followed the truck for five minutes, but did not observe any suspicious behavior. Nevertheless, officers conducted a traffic stop and discovered 30 pounds (14 kg) of marijuana in the truck. At trial, the occupants of the car argued that the traffic stop violated the Fourth Amendment of the United States Constitution, because the tip was unreliable, and officers did not personally observe criminal activity. Writing for a majority of the Court, Justice Clarence Thomas held that the 911 call was reliable, and that officers need not personally observe criminal activity when acting upon information provided by an anonymous 911 call.

Justice Antonin Scalia wrote a "scathing" dissenting opinion, in which he argued that the tip was unreliable, and that the majority's opinion threatened the freedom and liberty of all citizens. Likewise, many commentators have noted Navarette represented a departure from earlier precedent, and that the opinion opened the door for expansive new police powers. Some commentators have also noted that the case leaves open several important questions, including the unanswered question of whether anonymous reports of extremely dangerous behavior require fewer indicia of reliability before police may act upon those reports. Other scholars have argued it was highly unlikely that Lorenzo and Jose Prado Navarette were actually driving under the influence of drugs or alcohol when they were stopped by police.

== Background ==
=== Fourth Amendment guidelines for traffic stops ===
Although criminal detentions usually require reasonable suspicion that the suspect has engaged in criminal activity, an officer may conduct a traffic stop if the officer has a reasonable, articulable suspicion that the driver is engaging in criminal activity. Officers may not rely upon a mere "hunch", but the level of suspicion required to conduct a traffic stop is “considerably less than proof of wrongdoing by a preponderance of the evidence”, and less than is necessary for probable cause. However, the Supreme Court of the United States has clarified that the reasonable suspicion required to justify a traffic stop depends upon "both the content of information possessed by police and its degree of reliability", while taking into account “the totality of the circumstances — the whole picture.”

=== Fourth Amendment searches and seizures based on anonymous tips ===
In Illinois v. Gates, the Supreme Court established that courts should apply a "totality of the circumstances" test to determine whether an anonymous tip is sufficiently reliable to provide probable cause to issue an arrest warrant. (Note: In Gates, the Court abandoned the Aguilar–Spinelli test for determining the reliability of anonymous tips, because the test could not "be reconciled with the fact that many warrants are ... issued on the basis of nontechnical, common-sense judgments of laymen applying a standard less demanding than those used in more formal legal proceedings.") Although officers in Gates did not personally witness any criminal activity, the Supreme Court held that the anonymous tip in question was reliable, because officers could verify several events predicted by the anonymous tip. Seven years after Gates, the Supreme Court held in Alabama v. White that an anonymous tip was sufficiently reliable to provide reasonable suspicion to justify a temporary detention, because the tip accurately predicted several key details. Although the Court conceded that White was a "close case", the tip in question "exhibited sufficient indicia of reliability" to justify a temporary detention. The Court explained that if "an informant is shown to be right about some things, he is probably right about other facts that he has alleged, including the claim that the object of the tip is engaged in criminal activity."

However, in Florida v. J.L., the Supreme Court ruled that police officers did not have reasonable suspicion to detain a suspect based on an anonymous tip “that a young black male standing at a particular bus stop and wearing a plaid shirt was carrying a gun.” The Court held that the tip "lacked the moderate indicia of reliability present in White and essential to the Court’s decision in that case. The anonymous call concerning J.L. provided no predictive information, and therefore left the police without means to test the informant’s knowledge or credibility.” The Court declined to create a "firearm exception" for anonymous tips, but the court noted in dicta that a tip describing a bomb threat need not bear the indicia of reliability otherwise required of other anonymous tips. The Supreme Court of California would later rely upon this "bomb exception" in People v. Wells, when it ruled that an anonymous tip that accurately described a vehicle “weaving all over the roadway” justified a traffic stop. The California court held that “considerations of public safety and common sense” permit officers to conduct traffic stops based on anonymous tips "to confirm the officer’s reasonable suspicion of intoxicated driving before a serious traffic accident can occur.”

=== Arrest and trial of Lorenzo and Jose Prado Navarette ===
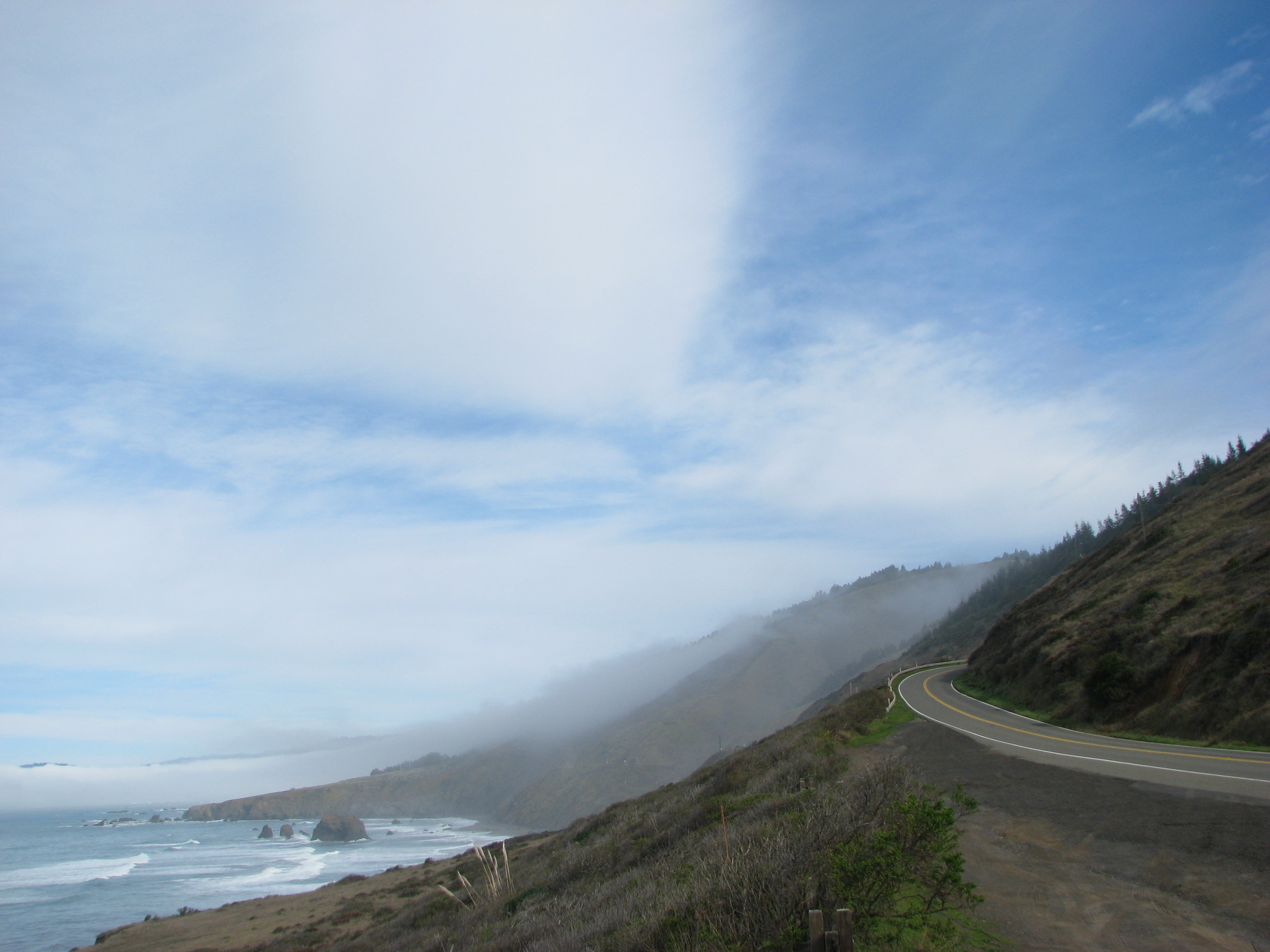
A portion of California State Route 1 near Fort Bragg, California, where Lorenzo and Jose Prado Navarette were arrested in August 2008.

On August 23, 2008, a California Highway Patrol ("CHP") dispatcher in Humboldt County, California received a 911 call from an anonymous caller. (Note: Although the 911 caller apparently identified herself by name, the prosecution did not introduce the tapes into evidence. Consequently, the prosecution and lower courts treated the 911 call as an anonymous tip.) According to the dispatcher, the caller reported a silver Ford F150 pickup with the license plate number "8D94925" ran them off the highway. The caller stated that the truck was last seen heading southbound on California State Route 1. CHP dispatchers relayed the report to officers in the geographic area, and the vehicle was soon spotted traveling southbound at mile marker 66 near Fort Bragg, California. Officers pulled over the vehicle and discovered that Lorenzo Prado Navarette and Jose Prado Navarette were the only occupants. After standing next to the cab of the pickup truck, the officers noticed "a very distinct smell of marijuana coming from the vehicle". Officers then searched the vehicle and found four large bags containing 30 pounds (14 kg) of marijuana, an unopened box of oven bags, clippers, and fertilizer in the bed of the truck.

On August 26, 2008, a felony complaint was filed in Mendocino County Superior Court, charging Lorenzo Prado Navarette and Jose Prado Navarette with transportation of marijuana in violation of section 11360(a) of the California Health and Safety Code, and possession of marijuana for sale in violation of section 11359 of the California Health and Safety Code. On June 26, 2009, Lorenzo Prado Navarette and Jose Prado Navarette filed a motion to suppress evidence, claiming that the traffic stop violated the Fourth Amendment of the United States Constitution, because officers "lacked reasonable suspicion of criminal activity". However, the magistrate who presided over the suppression hearing, and the superior court, both rejected the motion. Lorenzo Prado Navarette and Jose Prado Navarette subsequently pleaded guilty to transporting marijuana, and were sentenced to 90 days in prison and three years of probation.

Lorenzo Prado Navarette and Jose Prado Navarette filed an appeal in the California Court of Appeal, but the court affirmed the judgment of the Superior Court. Relying on the "public safety" exception established in People v. Wells, the court held that "ongoing danger to other motorists [justified] the stop without direct corroboration of the vehicle's illegal activity". The court noted that the vehicle was traveling on an "undivided two-lane road, thus raising the risk of a collision with oncoming traffic, which poses a particular risk to human life and limb." However, the court also held that the "anonymous tip itself had several indicia of reliability — the content of the tip strongly suggested it came from the victim and the tipster accurately described the appearance, location and direction of the vehicle." Lorenzo and Jose appealed again to the Supreme Court of California, but the Court declined to review their case. They then appealed to the Supreme Court of the United States, which granted their petition for certiorari on October 1, 2013. (Note: In 2009, the Supreme Court of the United States denied certiorari in a similar case, Virginia v. Harris, which also asked whether police who receive anonymous reports of drunk driving must personally observe a traffic violation before conducting a traffic stop. Chief Justice John Roberts wrote a dissenting opinion in which he urged the court to grant certiorari to answer the question of whether police may act upon an anonymous tip without personally verifying ongoing criminal activity.)

== Opinion of the Court ==
Writing for a majority of the Court, Justice Clarence Thomas held that the 911 call contained sufficient indicia of reliability to justify the traffic stop. Although he acknowledged that this was a "close case", Justice Thomas concluded that indicia of the 911 caller's reliability were stronger than those in Florida v. J.L., where the Court held a "bare-bones" tip was unreliable. Justice Thomas began his opinion by emphasizing that the Supreme Court had "firmly rejected the argument that reasonable cause for an investigative stop can only be based on the officer’s personal observation, rather than on information supplied by another person.” By identifying the make, model, and license plate number of the pickup truck, Justice Thomas argued that "the caller necessarily claimed eyewitness knowledge of the alleged dangerous driving," and that basis of knowledge supported the tip's reliability. Furthermore, Justice Thomas concluded that "[a] driver’s claim that another vehicle ran her off the road, however, necessarily implies that the informant knows the other car was driven dangerously." Justice Thomas also noted that the calls made through the 911 emergency system are particularly reliable, because calls are recorded and individuals may face prosecution for making false reports.

Justice Thomas also clarified that officers need not "rule out the possibility of innocent conduct" before making a traffic stop based on an anonymous tip. In light of the facts described in the 911 call, Justice Thomas argued that the reckless driving described in the 911 call "[bear] too great a resemblance to paradigmatic manifestations of drunk driving to be dismissed as an isolated example of recklessness." He concluded that officers therefore acted reasonably "under these circumstances in stopping a driver whose alleged conduct was a significant indicator of drunk driving". (Note: Justice Thomas noted, albeit in dicta, that "[u]nconfirmed reports of driving without a seatbelt or slightly over the speed limit, for example, are so tenuously connected to drunk driving that a stop on those grounds alone would be constitutionally suspect.") Justice Thomas noted that many drivers will behave more cautiously when followed by police officers, and he concluded that there was no need to conduct "[e]xtended observation" in this case, because "allowing a drunk driver a second chance for dangerous conduct could have disastrous consequences".

=== Dissenting opinion of Justice Scalia ===
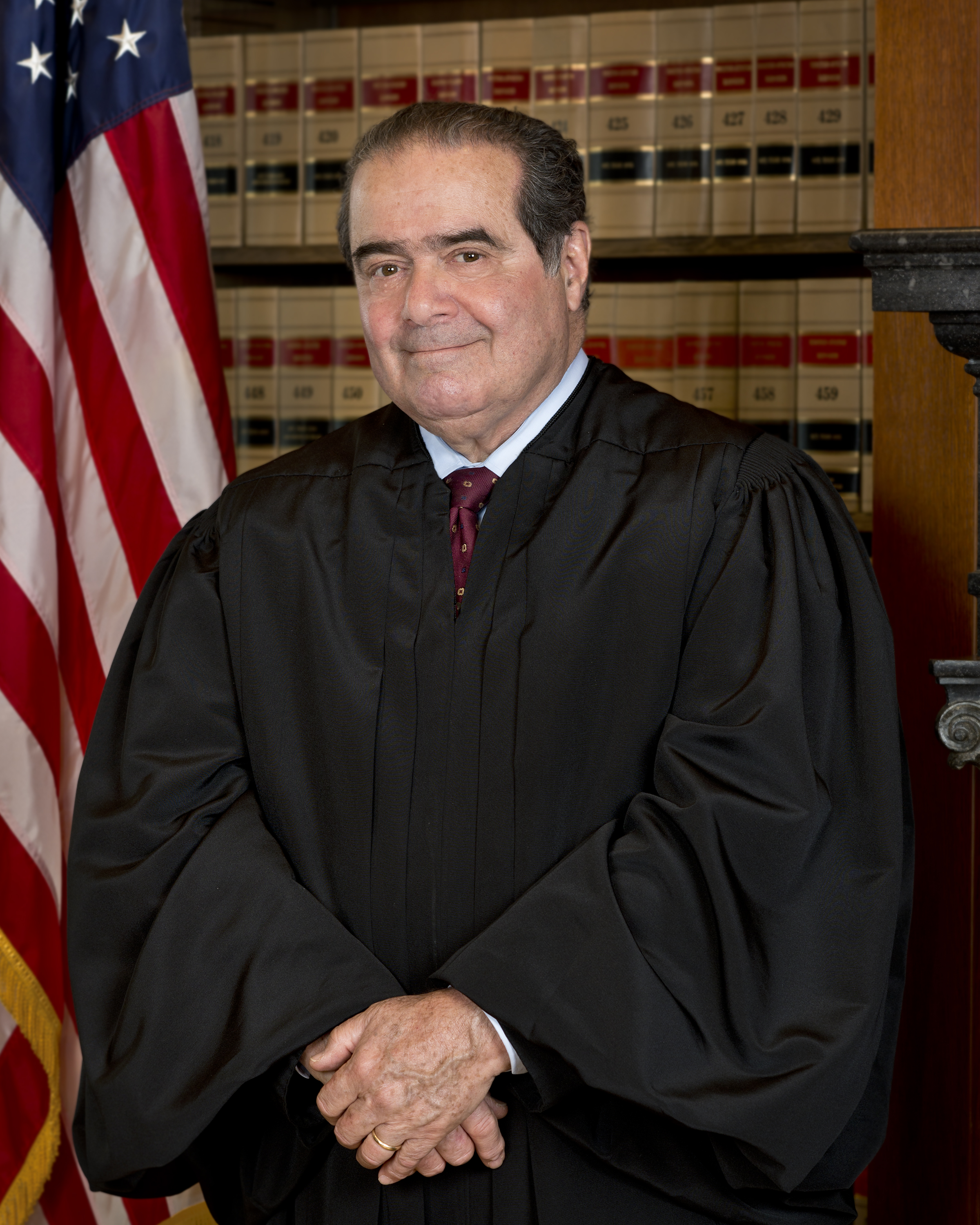
Justice Antonin Scalia called the majority's opinion a "freedom-destroying cocktail".

In his dissenting opinion, Justice Antonin Scalia argued that the majority's opinion was a "freedom-destroying cocktail." Although he recognized anonymous tips may sometimes be reliable, he rejected the majority's conclusion that "anonymous 911 reports of traffic violations are reliable so long as they correctly identify a car and its location." He wrote, "[t]his is not my concept, and I am sure would not be the Framers’, of a people secure from unreasonable searches and seizures." Justice Scalia argued that anonymous tips are inherently unreliable, because anonymous tipsters can "lie with impunity." While he admitted 911 calls are, in fact, easily traceable, Justice Scalia argued that there was no evidence the 911 caller knew they could be identified when they placed the call. Additionally, Justice Scalia distinguished the tip in this case from the tip in White, where "the reliability of the tip was established by the fact that it predicted the target’s behavior in the finest detail — a detail that could be known only by someone familiar with the target’s business." He argued that the general details provided in this case's 911 call were unreliable, because "everyone in the world who saw the car would have that knowledge, and anyone who wanted the car stopped would have to provide that information." Likewise, Justice Scalia argued that there was no evidence that the report of being run off the road was actually true.

Justice Scalia also criticized the majority's conclusion that the tip provided reasonable suspicion that Lorenzo and Jose Prado Navarette were driving while drunk, because "the truck might have swerved to avoid an animal, a pothole, or a jaywalking pedestrian .... Or, indeed, he might have intentionally forced the tipster off the road because of some personal animus, or hostility to her 'Make Love, Not War' bumper sticker." Furthermore, Justice Scalia argued that one discrete instance of irregular driving does not give rise to the reasonable suspicion of an ongoing threat of an intoxicated driver on the road. Justice Scalia also argued that the anonymous tip's claims of reckless driving were ultimately discredited by the fact that officers followed Lorenzo and Jose for five minutes, but observed nothing suspicious. He wrote, "I take it as a fundamental premise of our intoxicated-driving laws that a driver soused enough to swerve once can be expected to swerve again — and soon. If he does not, and if the only evidence of his first episode of irregular driving is a mere inference from an uncorroborated, vague, and nameless tip, then the Fourth Amendment requires that he be left alone." In his concluding remarks, Justice Scalia wrote "[d]runken driving is a serious matter, but so is the loss of our freedom to come and go as we please without police interference .... After today’s opinion all of us on the road, and not just drug dealers, are at risk of having our freedom of movement curtailed on suspicion of drunkenness, based upon a phone tip, true or false, of a single instance of careless driving."

== Subsequent developments ==
Many federal circuit courts and state supreme courts interpreting Navarette have affirmed the rule that officers need not personally corroborate incriminating details before making an arrest based on information provided by an anonymous tip. However, other courts interpreting Navarette have held that uncorroborated anonymous tips are not sufficient to provide reasonable suspicion of ongoing criminal activity. Additionally, courts in some jurisdictions have held that in order for officers to act upon an anonymous tip, the tip must provide a report of an ongoing crime, rather than a report of an isolated event that occurred in the past. Some courts have also rejected the assertion that the availability of caller information makes 911 calls inherently reliable. However, some courts have agreed with the notion that 911 calls are more reliable because callers may face criminal prosecution for making false reports. Other courts interpreting Navarette have held that the case established that less reliability is required when anonymous tips report "serious crime[s] or potential danger".

== Analysis and commentary ==
=== Immediate reactions ===
After the Court released its opinion, many commentators suggested that Navarette represented a significant expansion of the police's power to stop drivers on the road. Lyle Denniston, for example, remarked that the Court's opinion "gave police broad new authority." In its review of cases from the 2013 term, the Harvard Law Review suggested that "Navarette may add to the police's already expansive power," and that the case "heralds unwarranted curtailment of Fourth Amendment protections." Other commentators remarked that the case "seemed to lower the bar for assessments of anonymous tipsters." Paul Kleven, attorney for Lorenzo and Jose Prado Navarette, said that the ruling "makes it easier for anonymous tipsters to call in and sic police on people they don't like," while a spokesperson for the California Attorney General's office said "[w]e are pleased with the court's ruling, which supports the hard work of law enforcement."

=== Scholarly analysis ===
Scholars have observed that Navarette marked a departure from earlier precedent on the subject of anonymous tips, and some have argued that the case signifies a "dilution" of the Fourth Amendment's reasonable suspicion standard. One analyst argued that this departure "could encourage passive and sloppy policing, for officers will be tempted to rely on easily acquired anonymous tips rather than engage in arduous collection of evidence." Commentators have argued that Justice Kennedy's endorsement of the reliability of anonymous 911 calls signified a departure from earlier decisions that analyzed the reliability of tips under a totality of the circumstances framework. These commentators suggest that this departure "increases the risk of fabricated tips." Some analysts have also observed that the Court's opinion left several questions unanswered from earlier anonymous tip cases, including the question of whether there was an exception for dangerous crimes, and that the Court "missed an opportunity to give lower courts some much needed guidance." One commentator wrote, "[t]he time bomb mentioned in J.L. is still ticking". Another commentator argued that because Lorenzo Prado Navarette's driving was "irreproachable" for at least five minutes, "the probability that Lorenzo Navarette was legally drunk was surely less than the probability for the average daytime driver of a pickup truck; indeed, it ostensibly was all but zero."

== See also ==
- List of United States Supreme Court cases, volume 572
- List of United States Supreme Court cases
- Lists of United States Supreme Court cases by volume
- List of United States Supreme Court cases by the Roberts Court
