= Probable cause =

Legal concept in US law

In United States criminal law, probable cause is the legal standard by which police authorities have reason to obtain a warrant for the arrest of a suspected criminal and for a court's issuing of a search warrant. One definition of the standard derives from the U.S. Supreme Court decision in the case of Beck v. Ohio (1964), that probable cause exists when "at [the moment of arrest] the facts and circumstances within [the] knowledge [of the police], and of which they had reasonably trustworthy information, [are] sufficient to warrant a prudent [person] in believing that [a suspect] had committed or was committing an offense."

Moreover, the grand jury uses the probable cause standard to determine whether or not to issue a criminal indictment. The principle behind the probable cause standard is to limit the power of authorities to conduct unlawful search and seizure of person and property, and to promote formal, forensic procedures for gathering lawful evidence for the prosecution of the arrested criminal. In the case of Berger v. New York (1967), the Supreme Court said that the purpose of the probable-cause requirement of the Fourth Amendment is to keep the state out of Constitutionally protected areas until the state has reason to believe that a specific crime is being committed or has been committed. The term of criminal law, the probable cause standard is stipulated in the text of the Fourth Amendment to the U.S. Constitution:

The right of the people to be secure in their persons, houses, papers, and effects, against unreasonable searches and seizures, shall not be violated, and no Warrants shall issue, but upon probable cause, supported by Oath or affirmation, and particularly describing the place to be searched, and the persons or things to be seized.

Moreover, in U.S. immigration law, the term "reason to believe" is equivalent to the probable cause standard of criminal law, and should not be confused with reasonable suspicion, which is the legal criterion required to perform a Terry stop in the U.S.

== Definition ==
The usual definition of the probable cause standard includes "a reasonable amount of suspicion, supported by circumstances sufficiently strong to justify a prudent and cautious person's belief that certain facts are probably true." Notably, this definition does not require that the person making the recognition must hold a public office or have public authority, which allows the citizenry's common-sense understanding of the legal standard of probable cause for arrest.

Regarding the issuance of a warrant for arrest, probable cause is the "information sufficient to warrant a prudent person's belief that the wanted individual had committed a crime (for an arrest warrant) or that evidence of a crime or contraband would be found in a search (for a search warrant)". As a legal standard, probable cause is stronger than reasonable suspicion, but weaker than the requirement of evidence to secure a criminal conviction. Moreover, according to the Aguilar–Spinelli test a criminal court can choose to accept hearsay as a source of probable cause if the source-person is of reliable character or if other evidence supports the hearsay. In the case of Brinegar v. United States (1949), the Supreme Court defined probable cause as "where the facts and [the] circumstances within the officers' knowledge, and of which they have reasonably trustworthy information, are sufficient, in themselves, to warrant a belief, by a man of reasonable caution, that a crime is being committed."

== History and development ==
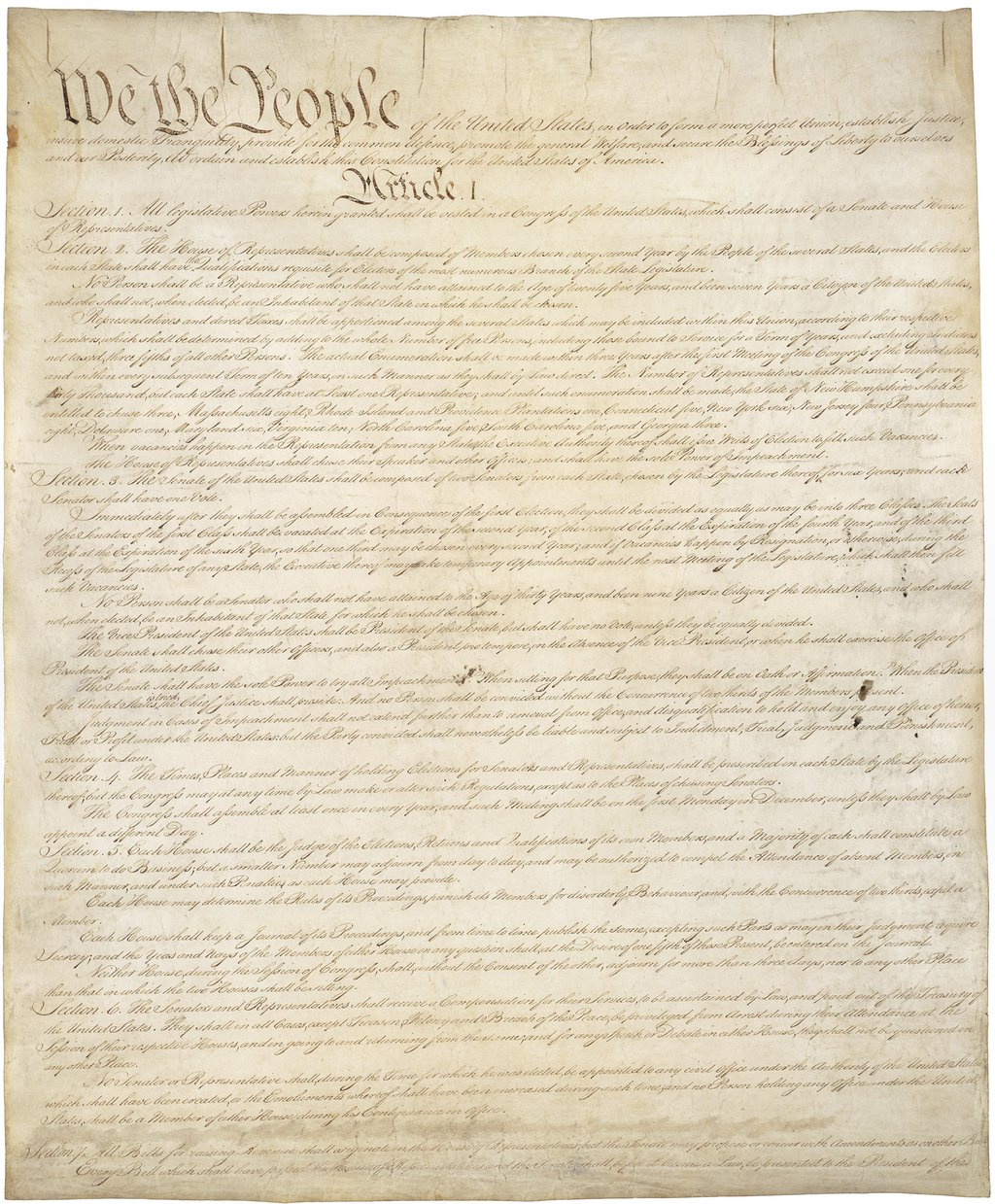
The first page of the Constitution of the United States

The use of probable cause in the United States and its integration in the Fourth Amendment has roots in English common law and the old saying that "a man's home is his castle". This is the idea that someone has the right to defend their "castle" or home from unwanted "attacks" or intrusion. In the 1600s, this saying started to apply legally to landowners to protect them from casual searches from government officials.

In the 1700s, the British use of the writs of assistance and general warrants, which allowed authorities to search wherever and whenever sometimes, without expiration date, in the American colonies were raised in several court cases. The first was in Massachusetts in 1761 when a customs agent submitted for a new writ of assistance and Boston merchants challenged its legality. In the case the lawyer for the merchants James Otis argued that writs of assistance violated the fundamentals of English Law and was unconstitutional. John Adams, a lawyer at the time who later wrote the Massachusetts provision on which the Fourth Amendment heavily relied, was impacted by James Otis's argument.

A case against general warrants was the English case Entick v. Carrington (1765). In that case, Lord Camden the chief judge said that general warrants were not the same as specific warrants and that parliament or case law could not authorize general warrants. Along with these statements, Lord Camden also affirmed that the needs of the state were more important than the individual's rights. This upheld the ideology of the social contract while holding to idea that the government purpose was to protect the property of the people. He called for the government to seek reasonable means in order to search private property, as well as a cause.

== Probationers and parolees ==
In early cases in the United States, the Supreme Court held that when a person is on probation, the standard required for a search to be lawful is lowered from "probable cause" to "reasonable grounds" or "reasonable suspicion". Specifically, the degree of individualized suspicion required of a search was a determination of when there is a sufficiently high probability that criminal conduct is occurring to make the intrusion on the individual's privacy interest reasonable. The Supreme Court held in United States v. Knights:

Although the Fourth Amendment ordinarily requires the degree of probability embodied in the term "probable cause," a lesser degree satisfies the Constitution when the balance of governmental and private interests makes such a standard reasonable ... When an officer has reasonable suspicion that a probationer subject to a search condition is engaged in criminal activity, there is enough likelihood that criminal conduct is occurring that an intrusion on the probationer's significantly diminished privacy interests is reasonable.

Later, in Samson v. California, the Supreme Court ruled that reasonable suspicion is not even necessary:

The California Legislature has concluded that, given the number of inmates the State paroles and its high recidivism rate, a requirement that searches be based on individualized suspicion would undermine the State's ability to effectively supervise parolees and protect the public from criminal acts by reoffenders. This conclusion makes eminent sense. Imposing a reasonable suspicion requirement, as urged by petitioner, would give parolees greater opportunity to anticipate searches and conceal criminality.

The court held that reasonableness, not individualized suspicion, is the touchstone of the Fourth Amendment. It has been proposed that Fourth Amendment rights be extended to probationers and parolees, but such proposals have not gained traction. There is not much that remains of the Fourth Amendment rights of probationers after waiving their right to be free from unreasonable searches and seizures. An essay called "They Released Me from My Cage...But They Still Keep Me Handcuffed" was written in response to the Samson decision.

It has been argued that the requirement that a police officer must have individualized suspicion before searching a parolee's person and home was long considered a foundational element of the Court's analysis of Fourth Amendment questions and that abandoning it in the name of crime prevention represents an unprecedented blow to individual liberties.

== Use of trained drug dogs ==
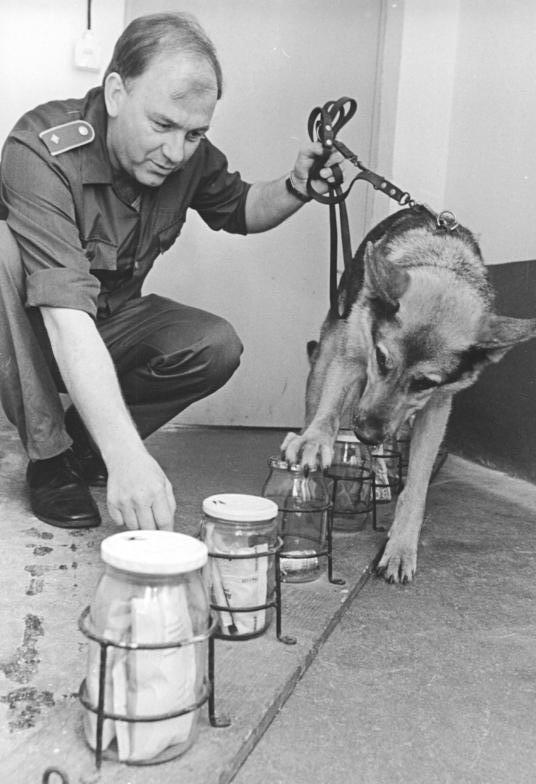
Officer training a drug dog

In the United States, use of a trained dog to smell for narcotics has been ruled in several court cases as sufficient probable cause. A K-9 sniff in a public area is not a search according to the Supreme Court's ruling in 1983 United States v. Place. In this particular case, Place was in LaGuardia Airport in New York City, and DEA agents took his luggage, even though he refused to have his bag searched. His luggage smelled of drugs, and the trained dog alerted the agents to this. Dogs alerting their officers provides enough probable cause for the officer to obtain a warrant. The DEA then procured a warrant and found a sizable amount of drugs in Place's luggage. It was not considered a search until after the warrant because a trained dog can sniff out the smell of narcotics, without having to open and look through the luggage. However, In Florida v. Jardines the court ruled that a police officer and narcotic-sniffing dog entering the porch of a home constitutes a search which invokes the requirement of probable cause or a valid search warrant.

The power of probable cause by K-9 units smelling for drugs is not limited to just airports, but even in schools, public parking lots, high crime neighborhood streets, mail, visitors in prisons, traffic stops, etc. If there is an incident where the dog alerts its officer, the probable cause from the dog is considered enough to conduct a search, as long as one of the exceptions to a warrant are present, such as incident to arrest, automobile, exigency, or with a stop and frisk. During a traffic stop and checkpoint, it is legal for police to allow a drug dog to sniff the exterior of the car. This is legal as long as it does not cause the traffic stop to be any longer than it would have been without the dog. If the dog finds a scent, it is again a substitute for probable cause.

== Cyber surveillance ==
Under the 2001 USA Patriot Act, law enforcement officials did not need probable cause to access communications records, credit cards, bank numbers and stored emails held by third parties. They only need reasonable suspicion that the information they were accessing was part of criminal activities. Under this, officers were authorized for a court order to access the communication information. Only certain information could be accessed under this act (such as names, addresses, and phone numbers, etc.). Probable cause was, and is, needed for more detailed information because law enforcement needs a warrant to access additional information. Generally, law enforcement was not required to notify the suspect. However, the text of the Patriot Act limits the application of that statute to issues that clearly involve the national security of the United States. The relevant sections of the Act expired on June 1, 2015.

== Consent to search ==
If voluntary consent is given and the individual giving the consent has authority over the search area, such as a car, house, business, etc. then a law enforcement officer does not need probable cause or even reasonable suspicion. If the person does not give voluntary consent, then the officer needs probable cause, and in some cases, a search warrant may be required to search the premises. Unless another exclusion to the fourth amendment of the US constitution occurs, when the person withdraws their consent for searching, the officer has to stop looking immediately.

== Accident investigation ==
In the United States, the term probable cause is used in accident investigation to describe the conclusions reached by the investigating body as to the factor or factors which caused the accident. This is primarily seen in reports on aircraft accidents, but the term is used for the conclusion of diverse types of transportation accidents investigated in the United States by the National Transportation Safety Board or its predecessor, the Civil Aeronautics Board.

== Related cases ==
=== In the United States ===
- The Supreme Court decision Illinois v. Gates lowered the threshold of probable cause by ruling that a "substantial chance" or "fair probability" of criminal activity could establish probable cause. A better-than-even chance is not required.
- The decision in Terry v. Ohio established that "stop and frisks" (seizures) may be made under reasonable suspicion if the officer believes a crime has been committed, is, or soon will be committed with a weapon concealed on such person.
- In United States v. Matlock, the Court announced the "co-occupant consent rule" which permitted one resident to consent in the co-occupant's absence. The case established that an officer who made a search with a reasonable belief that the search was consented to by a resident did not have to provide a probable cause for the search.

However, in Georgia v. Randolph, the Supreme Court ruled, thus replacing Matlock, when officers are presented with a situation wherein two parties, each having authority to grant consent to search premises they share, but one objects over the other's consent, the officers must adhere to the wishes of the non-consenting party.

- New Jersey v. T. L. O. set a special precedent for searches of students at school. The Court ruled that school officials act as state officers when conducting searches, and do not require probable cause to search students' belongings, only reasonable suspicion. However, In Safford Unified School District v. Redding The court ruled that strip searches of students required probable cause or a search warrant.
- In O'Connor v. Ortega, the Court relied on T.L.O. to extend the reasonable suspicion standard to administrative searches of public employees' belongings or workplaces when conducted by supervisors seeking evidence of violations of workplace rules rather than criminal offenses.

== Probable cause hearings ==
In the various states, a probable cause hearing is the preliminary hearing typically taking place before arraignment and before a serious crime goes to trial. The judge is presented with the basis of the prosecution's case, and the defendant is afforded full right of cross-examination and the right to be represented by legal counsel. If the prosecution cannot make a case of probable cause, the court must dismiss the case against the accused.

== Comparison with other countries ==
=== Sweden ===
In the criminal code of some European countries, notably Sweden, probable cause is a higher level of suspicion than "justifiable grounds" in a two level system of formal suspicion. The latter refers only to the suspect being able to and sometimes having a motive to commit the crime and in some cases witness accounts, whereas probable cause generally requires a higher degree of physical evidence and allows for longer periods of detention before trial. See häktning.

=== United Kingdom ===
==== England and Wales ====
Powers of arrest without a warrant can be exercised by a constable who "has reasonable grounds" to suspect that an individual is "about to commit an offence", or is "committing an offence"; in accordance with the Serious Organised Crime and Police Act 2005 and the partially repealed Police and Criminal Evidence Act 1984. The concept of "reasonable grounds for suspecting" is used throughout the law dealing with police powers.

==== Scotland ====
In Scotland, the legal language that provides the police with powers pertaining to stopping, arresting and searching a person – who "has committed or is committing an offence", or is in possession of an offensive article, or an article used in connection with an offence – is similar to that in England and Wales. The powers are provided by the Criminal Procedure (Scotland) Act 1995 and the Police, Public Order and Criminal Justice (Scotland) Act 2005.

== See also ==
- Civil rights
- Consent search
- Moral certainty
- Reasonable suspicion
- Preponderance of evidence
- Reasonable doubt
- Rights
- Terry stop
- Warrantless searches in the United States
