= Aguilar–Spinelli test =

Former U.S. legal test to determine the validity of a warrantless arrest

In United States law, the Aguilar–Spinelli test was a judicial guideline set down by the U.S. Supreme Court for evaluating the validity of a search warrant or a warrantless arrest based on information provided by a confidential informant or an anonymous tip. The Supreme Court abandoned the Aguilar–Spinelli test in Illinois v. Gates, 462 U.S. 213 (1983), in favor of a rule that evaluates the reliability of the information under the "totality of the circumstances." However, Alaska, Hawaii, Massachusetts, New York, Vermont, Oregon, and Washington have retained the Aguilar–Spinelli test, based on their own state constitutions.

The two aspects of the test are that, when law enforcement seeks a search warrant and a magistrate signs a warrant:

- The magistrate must be informed of the reasons to support the conclusion that such an informant is reliable and credible.
- The magistrate must be informed of some of the underlying circumstances relied on by the person providing the information.

This information provided to a magistrate will allow the magistrate to make an independent evaluation of the probable cause that a crime has been or will be committed.

When a warrantless arrest occurs based on information provided by a confidential informant or anonymous source, for the arrest to be lawful, the police must establish that the information relied on in making the arrest meets the same two basic elements described above.

At a post arraignment hearing the police must:

1. demonstrate facts that show their informant is reliable and credible, and
2. establish some of the underlying circumstances relied upon by the person providing the information.

If prior to trial, the police cannot establish both prongs of the test, a judge may dismiss the case for lack of probable cause to make the warrantless arrest.

== Background ==
According to the Fourth Amendment to the U.S. Constitution:

The right of the people to be secure in their persons, houses, papers, and effects, against unreasonable searches and seizures, shall not be violated, and no Warrants shall issue, but upon probable cause, supported by Oath or affirmation, and particularly describing the place to be searched, and the persons or things to be seized.

Historically in the United States, if the police made an illegal search and seizure of evidence, the evidence, once obtained, could often be used against a defendant in a criminal trial regardless of its illegality.

By a unanimous decision in the case of Weeks v. United States, 232 U.S. 383 (1914), the Supreme Court adopted the "exclusionary rule". This rule declared that, in most circumstances, evidence obtained through an illegal search and seizure could not be used as admissible evidence in a criminal trial. (This decision adopted the rule only on the federal level. It was not until Mapp v. Ohio, 367 U.S. 643 (1961), that the exclusionary rule was held to be binding on the states through the doctrine of selective incorporation.)

Subsequently, the defense in many criminal trials attempted to prove that a search warrant was invalid, thus making the search illegal and hence the evidence obtained through the search inadmissible in the trial. However, there were no hard guidelines defining the legality of a search warrant and it could be difficult for a judge to decide upon a warrant’s validity.

In order to obtain a search warrant in the United States, a law officer must appear before a judge or magistrate and swear or affirm that they have probable cause to believe that a crime has been committed. The officer is required to present their evidence and an affidavit to a magistrate, setting forth the evidence. "An affidavit must provide the magistrate with a substantial basis for determining the existence of probable cause." In other words, the law officer must present evidence, not merely their conclusions. "Sufficient information must be presented to the magistrate to allow that official to determine probable cause; his action cannot be a mere ratification of the bare conclusions of others."

In Johnson v. United States, 333 U.S. 10 (1948), the Court said:

The point of the Fourth Amendment, which often is not grasped by zealous officers, is not that it denies law enforcement the support of the usual inferences which reasonable men draw from evidence. Its protection consists in requiring that those inferences be drawn by a neutral and detached magistrate instead of being judged by the officer engaged in the often competitive enterprise of ferreting out crime.

== Development of the two-pronged test ==
In Aguilar v. Texas, 378 U.S. 108 (1964), the Court said:

[T]he magistrate must be informed of some of the underlying circumstances relied on by the person providing the information and some of the underlying circumstances from which the affiant concluded that the informant, whose identity was not disclosed, was creditable or his information reliable.

In Spinelli v. United States, 393 U.S. 410 (1969), the Court went further by requiring that a magistrate must be informed of the "underlying circumstances from which the informant had concluded" that a crime had been committed.

== Abandonment of the two-pronged test ==
In Illinois v. Gates, 462 U.S. 213 (1983), the Supreme Court explicitly abandoned the two-pronged rule in favor of the totality of the circumstances rule. According to the opinion, written by Justice William Rehnquist:

The rigid "two-pronged test" under Aguilar and Spinelli for determining whether an informant’s tip establishes probable cause for issuance of a warrant is abandoned, and the "totality of the circumstances" approach that traditionally has informed probable-cause determinations is substituted in its place.

== Survival of the two-pronged test in state law ==
Individual states can provide more rights under their own laws than the Federal Constitution requires. At least six states — Alaska, (Note: State v. Jones, 706 P.2d 317 (Alaska 1985)) Hawaii, (Note: State v. Navas, 81 Hawai'i 29, 911 P.2d 1101 (HI App Ct 1995) aff'd 81 Hawai'i 113, 913 P.2d 39 (1996)) Massachusetts, (Note: Commonwealth v. Banville, 457 Mass. 530, 538, 931 N.E.2d 457, 464 (2010), citing Commonwealth v. Upton, 394 Mass. 363, 373, 476 N.E.2d 548 (1985).) New York, (Note: People v. Bigelow, 66 N.Y.2d 417, 424–426, 497 N.Y.S.2d 630, 633–635 (1985); People v. Griminger, 71 N.Y.2d 635, 524 N.E.2d 409 (1988); People v. DiFalco, 80 N.Y.2d 693, 610 N.E.2d 352, 594 N.Y.S.2d 679 (1993); People v. Parris, 83 N.Y.2d 342, 632 N.E.2d 870, 610 N.Y.S.2d 464 (1994).) Vermont (Note: State v. Goldberg, 872 A.2d 378 (Vt. 2005).) and Washington (Note: State v. Jackson, 688 P.2d 136 (Wash. 1984).) — have rejected the Gates rationale and have retained the two-prong Aguilar–Spinelli test on independent state law grounds.
