= Illinois v. Gates =

- Supreme Court of the United States

Argued October 10, 1982 Reargued March 1, 1983 Decided June 8, 1983
- Full case name: Illinois v. Gates et ux.
- Citations: 462 U.S. 213 (more) 103 S. Ct. 2317; 76 L. Ed. 2d 527

Case history
- Prior: 85 Ill. 2d 376, 423 N.E.2d 887; cert. granted, 454 U.S. 1140 (1982).

Holding
- The rigid "two-pronged test" under Aguilar and Spinelli for determining whether an informant's tip establishes probable cause for issuance of a warrant is abandoned, and the "totality of the circumstances" approach that traditionally has informed probable cause determinations is substituted in its place.

Court membership
- Chief Justice Warren E. Burger Associate Justices William J. Brennan Jr. · Byron White; Thurgood Marshall · Harry Blackmun; Lewis F. Powell Jr. · William Rehnquist; John P. Stevens · Sandra Day O'Connor

Case opinions
- Majority: Rehnquist, joined by Burger, Blackmun, Powell, O'Connor
- Concurrence: White (in judgment)
- Dissent: Brennan, joined by Marshall
- Dissent: Stevens, joined by Brennan

Laws applied
- U.S. Const. amend. IV
- This case overturned a previous ruling or rulings
- Aguilar v. Texas (1964, in part); Spinelli v. United States (1969)

Illinois v. Gates, 462 U.S. 213 (1983), is a Fourth Amendment case. Gates overruled Aguilar v. Texas and Spinelli v. United States, thereby replacing the Aguilar–Spinelli test for probable cause with the "totality of the circumstances" test.

== Facts and procedural history ==
In May 1978, the Bloomingdale, Illinois Police Department received an anonymous letter. The letter stated:

This letter is to inform you that you have a couple in your town who strictly make their living on selling drugs. They are Sue and Lance Gates, they live on Greenway, off Bloomingdale Rd. in the condominiums. Most of their buys are done in Florida. Sue his wife drives their car to Florida, where she leaves it to be loaded up with drugs, then Lance flys down and drives it back. Sue flys back after she drops the car off in Florida. May 3 she is driving down there again and Lance will be flying down in a few days to drive it back. At the time Lance drives the car back he has the trunk loaded with over $100,000.00 in drugs. Presently they have over $100,000.00 worth of drugs in their basement.

They brag about the fact they never have to work, and make their entire living on pushers.

I guarantee if you watch them carefully you will make a big catch. They are friends with some big drugs dealers, who visit their house often.

Detective Mader decided to follow up on the tip, obtaining further information that an "L. Gates" had purchased an airline ticket leaving from Chicago's O'Hare Airport and arriving in West Palm Beach, Florida. Working with the DEA, Mader was able to ascertain that Gates had boarded the plane and arrived in West Palm Beach. The DEA surveillance team determined that Gates had met a woman at a Holiday Inn room registered to Susan Gates and that the couple had gotten into a car together driving toward the Chicago area. They estimated the pair due back in Bloomingdale within 22 to 24 hours.

Mader signed an affidavit laying down the events as they had unfolded, in addition to the anonymous letter. A judge of the Circuit Court of DuPage County issued a warrant. Upon the Gates' arrival home, the Bloomingdale Police searched the car, recovering over 350 lb. of marijuana. A search of the Gates' residence led to the discovery of additional marijuana and weapons.

The Illinois Circuit Court decided that the search was unlawful based on the test established in the Supreme Court ruling in Spinelli v. United States. In essence, the affidavit did not provide enough evidence to establish probable cause, which led to the exclusion of evidence obtained on the basis of that warrant. This ruling was upheld by both the Illinois Appellate Courts and the Supreme Court of Illinois.

The case was brought to the United States Supreme Court when the state and several amici curiae, friends of the court, asked them to review the decision. The main question that was presented was, "May a judge issue a search warrant on basis of partially corroborated anonymous informant's tip?"

== Holding ==
The Supreme Court overturned the ruling of the Illinois courts. Justice William Rehnquist delivered the decision in favor of the State of Illinois. Justice Rehnquist stated:

We agree with the Illinois Supreme Court that an informant's "veracity," "reliability" and "basis of knowledge" are all highly relevant in determining the value of his report. We do not agree, however, that these elements should be understood as entirely separate and independent requirements to be rigidly exacted in every case... [T]hey should be understood simply as closely intertwined issues that may usefully illuminate the common sense, practical question whether there is "probable cause" to believe that contraband or evidence is located in a particular place.

This rejected the Aguilar–Spinelli test and put in place a totality-of-the-circumstances standard. This was put into place because the court recognized that there was more evidence that the Gates family were involved in drug trafficking than just the letter standing alone. The court agreed that if the letter had just stood alone it would not be probable cause to get a warrant. The court also recognized that under the Aguilar–Spinelli two-pronged test, it would be very hard for the "reliability" prong to ever be satisfied from an anonymous tip so it therefore should be abandoned.

This case is a landmark case in the evolution of probable cause and search warrants. In this case, the Supreme Court abandons the Aguilar–Spinelli test.

== Dissent ==
In dissent, Justice Brennan, joined by Justice Marshall, stated that "Only one of the cases cited by the Court in support of its 'totality of the circumstances' approach, Jaben v. United States, 381 U.S. 214 (1965), was decided subsequent to Aguilar. It is by no means inconsistent with Aguilar." The dissent argued that the two pronged test of the honesty of the informant and the basis of knowledge was more protective of a citizen's rights, leaving less chance of a warrant being issued based upon the claims of a dishonest or unreliable "informant." The dissenters believed that the Aguilar–Spinelli test was effective and should not have been replaced; that tests and laws that protect the rights of accused are too easily disregarded because the court and law enforcers are eager to prosecute suspects; and that the rights of the suspects also have to be protected. The dissenters stated,"By replacing Aguilar and Spinelli with a test that provides no assurance that magistrates, rather than the police, or informants, will make determinations of probable cause; imposes no structure on magistrates' probable-cause inquiries; and invites the possibility that intrusions may be justified on less than reliable information from an honest or credible person, today's decision threatens to obliterate one of the most fundamental distinctions between our form of government, where officers are under the law, and the police-state, where they are the law." Justice Brennan and Justice Marshall also argued that the court did not show any persuasive reasoning for rejecting Aguilar and Spinelli, saying that the Court "reflects impatience with what it perceives to be overly technical rules governing searches and seizures under the Fourth Amendment." The dissenters supported their opinion by stating that, "Words such as practical, nontechnical, and common sense, as used in the Court's opinion, are but code words for an overly permissive attitude towards police practices in derogation of the rights secured by the Fourth Amendment." In other words, taking away suspects' rights is not a correct way to enforce drug laws, even though drug trafficking is reprehensible. The dissenters would have affirmed the Illinois court and excluded the evidence.

== Concurring ==
Justice White concurred in the judgment. He wrote that in this case, the search and seizure was consistent with the Fourth Amendment. He stated that it was reasonable for the search of the Gates' house. He stated that the exclusion of the evidence would have set the criminals free and it would not have served "any constitutional interest in securing compliance with the important requirements of the Fourth Amendment." Justice White does not believe that the exclusionary rule should be used in any case where law enforcement officials reasonably believe their actions are consistent with the Fourth Amendment.

== Additional points ==
In Illinois v. Gates, probable cause was achieved for the warrant under the new "totality-of-the-circumstances" standard because the investigation by DEA and Detective Mader would have, on its own, been probable cause for a search warrant. The Gates' actions were suspicious because Florida is a known source of illegal drugs. Lance Gates' stay at a motel for one night and immediate return to Chicago suggests that he was not going for a vacation and also implies that he might be involved in something illegal. The Court, after having heard oral argument, furthermore requested in November 1982 that the parties and amici submit briefs on the broader issue of whether the exclusionary rule should be modified. When the opinion in Gates was rendered, however, the Court declined to rule on the issue, stating that the issue was "not pressed or passed upon below" and that the exclusionary rule had become too difficult as an issue of great public importance to have been re-examined at the time.

== See also ==
- List of United States Supreme Court cases, volume 462
- Aguilar–Spinelli test
