= List of consent to search case law articles =

This article is a chronological list of United States criminal case law articles on Wikipedia that discuss the Fourth Amendment constitutional provision against unreasonable search and seizure in its relation to consent to search.

== Warren Court (1953–1968) ==
- Stoner v. California (1964) - motel employees cannot give consent
- Katz v. United States (1967) - telephone booth has reasonable expectation of privacy

== Burger Court (1969–1986) ==
- Frazier v. Cupp (1969) - one person can give consent in case of joint custody
- Schneckloth v. Bustamonte (1973) - government must show that consent occurred
- United States v. Watson (1976) - valid consent from person under arrest
- United States v. Mendenhall (1980) - consent stop converted to Terry stop
- South Dakota v. Neville (1983) - refusal to DUI test can be used as proof of guilt
- Florida v. Royer (1983) - consent obtained during unlawful detention is invalid

== Rehnquist Court (1986–2005) ==
- Illinois v. Rodriguez (1990) - search valid if police reasonably believe consent given by owner
- Florida v. Bostick (1991) - not "free to leave" but "free to decline" on bus
- Florida v. Jimeno (1991) - can request officer to limit scope of search
- Ohio v. Robinette (1996) - do not have to inform motorist is free to go
- United States v. Drayton (2002) - police do not have to advise you of rights before search

== Roberts Court (2005–present) ==
- Georgia v. Randolph (2006) - cannot search house if one resident agrees but another resident objects
