= Consent search =

Type of search under U.S. law

Consent searches (or consensual searches) are searches conducted by United States law enforcement after obtaining the voluntary consent of the person being investigated. In some cases, consent may also be obtained from certain third-parties. Searches that are the product of consent are one of several recognized exceptions to the warrant requirement of the Fourth Amendment to the United States Constitution. The prosecution bears the burden of proving that consent was freely and voluntarily given. Courts look to the totality of the circumstances to determine whether consent was freely and voluntarily given.

The three main categories of searches are a search of a house, automobile or pedestrian. In the case of an automobile, it is assumed the officer has already seized the car and the encounter is a Terry stop. When an officer returns a driver's identification, the encounter has been transformed into a consensual encounter. In the case of a pedestrian, a consensual encounter can lead to a Terry stop based on information gathered during conversation. Some states and cities pass laws that require officers to notify a right to refuse in one case, but not the others.

The person has the right to refuse to give consent, and except in limited cases may revoke consent at any point during the search. In addition, the prosecution in any trial using the search results as evidence is required to prove that the consent was voluntary and not a result of coercion.

In contrast to Miranda rights, officers conducting a consent search are not required to warn people of their right to withhold consent in order for consent to be valid, as determined by the U.S. Supreme Court in Schneckloth v. Bustamonte. Police are not required to conduct a search in a way that gives the individual an opportunity to revoke consent, as determined in United States v. Rich, where the U.S. Court of Appeals for the Fifth Circuit rejected the argument that "officials must conduct all searches in plain view of the suspect, and in a manner slowly enough that he may withdraw or delimit his consent at any time during the search."

A 2024 study found that consent searches are less likely than probable cause searches to result in discovery of contraband.

== Different categories of Consent searches ==
=== Pedestrian encounters ===
Oftentimes an officer will have neither reasonable suspicion to stop an individual nor probable cause to arrest that person. A common tactic is to engage in conversation with the individual in an attempt to get them to incriminate themselves. This can, possibly, include a consent search.

=== Traffic stops ===
In Ohio v. Robinette (1996) the Supreme Court decided an officer does not need to inform the driver that the stop has ended. He can continue questioning and request a search of the vehicle. Since the encounter has now become a consensual encounter it is outside the protection of the Fourth Amendment. The Supreme Court assumed that a reasonable person would know the encounter was over and feel free to drive away.

=== Home search ===
Consent searches on people's homes have been given a higher level of scrutiny by the Supreme Court. This is because they happen in private without outside observers. The court is much more sensitive to the possibility of coercion and more guidelines have been put in place to protect against this.

== Consent given by third parties ==
The person conducting the consent search does not necessarily have to be identified as a law enforcement officer, and the person granting consent need not be the person police suspect or ultimately charge.

In cases such as Lee v. United States, Lopez v. United States, and Hoffa v. United States, the courts have ruled that evidence found in searches based on consent obtained by an undercover officer or as an informer to be admissible.

A party other than the defendant can, in some limited cases, grant consent. The consenting party needs to actually possess or be believed by the searching officer to possess "common authority over or other sufficient relationship to the premises or effects sought to be inspected." For example, the Supreme Court in United States v. Matlock (1974) held that co-occupant of a house had actual authority to consent to a search of the house. In Illinois v. Rodriguez (1990), the Supreme Court held that a search was valid if the police reasonably believed that the party giving consent had actual authority over the premises, but were incorrect in their belief. When two co-occupants are present, and one consents to a search but the other expressly objects, the Supreme Court has found that the police cannot validly search the premises. However, if the objecting party is subsequently lawfully arrested and removed from the premises, the Court has held in Fernandez v. California (2014) that the police may search with the consent of the co-occupant remaining on the premises.

== Revoking consent and exceptions ==
Usually, consent can be revoked at almost any time during a consent-based search. If consent is revoked, the officer or officers performing the search are required to immediately stop searching. However, the right to revoke consent is not recognized in two specific cases: airport passenger screening and prison visitation.

=== Withdrawing consent ===
Once consent to search is given, an individual may withdraw or restrict a search. Consent is considered withdrawn if an unequivocal statement is made either through statements, actions, or a combination of both.

=== Exceptions to revoking consent ===
Most courts have found the right to revoke consent is removed once a passenger has begun X-ray screening. In United States v. Herzbrun (1984), the U.S. Court of Appeals for the Eleventh Circuit found Herzbrun "had no constitutional right to revoke his consent to a search of his bag once it entered the X-ray machine and he walked through the magnetometer." And in United States v. Pulido-Baquerizo (9th Cir. 1986), the court explained that "[a] rule allowing a passenger to leave without a search after an inconclusive X-ray scan would encourage airline terrorism by providing a secure exit where detection was threatened."

A similar argument is applied to searches of prison visitors, for example, in United States v. Spriggs (1993). As long as a prison visitor is warned that all visitors will be searched and consents to the search, consent cannot be revoked once the search has begun. Allowing consent to be withdrawn, the court reasoned, would encourage the smuggling of contraband into prisons by providing a secure escape to the smuggler.

During the course of a search an officer may develop reasonable suspicion or probable cause; once this has been developed the individual loses the right to revoke consent. However, in United States v. Fuentes (1997), the court found the "[m]ere refusal to consent to a stop or search does not give rise to reasonable suspicion or probable cause."

== Cities and states requiring informed consent ==
=== Colorado ===
In May 2010, the state of Colorado enacted an informed consent law requiring police to inform drivers of their right to decline a consent search. The law was enacted in an effort to reduce racial profiling. It extends not only to drivers but also pedestrians. Because the law focused on Fourth Amendment protections, it was able to get bipartisan agreement and was signed by the governor, a former tough-on-crime District Attorney.

=== Fayetteville, North Carolina ===
Fayetteville, North Carolina, (population 209,889) came under criticism after a study showed between 2009 and 2010 black motorists were three times more likely than whites to be searched after a stop. The city manager was forced out and the police chief retired. A law was passed requiring police to get written consent before performing a search beginning March, 2012. A new police chief was given a mandate to rebuild community trust.

=== Durham, North Carolina ===
In October, 2014 Durham, North Carolina (pop. 267,743), in response to a collection of groups led by the Southern Coalition for Social Justice, adopted a written-consent policy for all searches. This was after the city was presented with clear documentation that black motorists were searched well above their share to the city's population. In implementing the policy, the city manager said it was in the interests of regaining the trust of the community.

=== New York City ===
The Right to Know Act was passed in 2017 by New York City's city council in response to the aggressive use of stop-and-frisk in New York City by the police department. The law consists of two parts. One is the "Consent to Search" law which requires an officer to inform someone they have the right to deny a search and to make sure that person understands that right. The other is the "NYPD ID" law, which requires the officer, in certain situations, to hand out business cards with their name, rank, badge number and command.

== See also ==
- Fourth Amendment to the United States Constitution
