= United States v. Drayton =

- Supreme Court of the United States

Argued April 16, 2002 Decided June 17, 2002
- Full case name: UNITED STATES, Petitioner v. Christopher DRAYTON and Clifton Brown, Jr.
- Citations: 536 U.S. 194 (more) 122 S. Ct. 2105; 153 L. Ed. 2d 242; 2002 U.S. LEXIS 4420; 70 U.S.L.W. 4552; 2002 Cal. Daily Op. Service 5321; 2002 Daily Journal DAR 6707; 15 Fla. L. Weekly Fed. S 367

Case history
- Prior: United States v. Drayton, 231 F.3d 787 (11th Cir. 2000); cert. granted, 534 U.S. 1074 (2002).

Holding
- Police officers who questioned and searched passengers on a bus did not violate the Fourth Amendment because the passengers consented to the search and the passengers were free to exit the bus

Court membership
- Chief Justice William Rehnquist Associate Justices John P. Stevens · Sandra Day O'Connor; Antonin Scalia · Anthony Kennedy; David Souter · Clarence Thomas; Ruth Bader Ginsburg · Stephen Breyer

Case opinions
- Majority: Kennedy, joined by Rehnquist, O'Connor, Scalia, Thomas, Breyer
- Dissent: Souter, joined by Stevens, Ginsburg

Laws applied
- U.S. Const. amend. IV

United States v. Drayton, 536 U.S. 194 (2002), was a case in which the United States Supreme Court clarified the applicability of Fourth Amendment protections to searches and seizures that occur on buses, as well as the function of consent during searches by law enforcement. During a scheduled stop in Tallahassee, Florida, police officers boarded a Greyhound bus as part of a drug interdiction effort and interviewed passengers. After talking to two of the passengers and asking if they could "check [their] person", officers discovered the two passengers had taped several packages of cocaine to their legs. At trial, the passengers argued that officers violated their Fourth Amendment rights against unreasonable searches and seizures because the police engaged in coercive behavior and never informed them that their participation in the drug interdiction efforts was voluntary.

Writing for a majority of the Court, Justice Anthony Kennedy held officers need not personally advise passengers of their right to refuse consent to a search on a bus. Furthermore, Justice Kennedy ruled that the search was not unreasonable because passengers were free to leave the bus and the individuals who were searched provided voluntary consent. Although some commentators have praised the Court's ruling for encouraging citizens "to stand up for their rights", others have criticized it for failing to reflect the realities of "real-life confrontations occurring on the street" between citizens and law enforcement.

== Background ==
=== Fourth Amendment guidelines for arrests and temporary detentions ===
The Fourth Amendment of the United States Constitution applies to both arrests and temporary detentions of criminal suspects, both of which have been defined by the Supreme Court of the United States as "seizures" of a person. Before conducting an arrest, an officer must demonstrate probable cause that a suspect has engaged in criminal activity. However, police officers may also conduct temporary detentions when officers have reasonable, articulable suspicion that "criminal activity may be afoot". These temporary detentions are also known as Terry stops, which take their name from the Supreme Court's ruling in Terry v. Ohio. The level of suspicion that is required to conduct a temporary detention is lower than is necessary for probable cause and is “considerably less than proof of wrongdoing by a preponderance of the evidence”; however officers cannot rely upon a mere "hunch".

=== The Fourth Amendment Consent to Search Doctrine ===
Although the Fourth Amendment generally prohibits unreasonable searches and seizures, the Supreme Court of the United States has clarified that searches and seizures are not unreasonable when citizens consent to them. Scholars have traced the origins of the Consent to Search Doctrine as far back as the 1920s, but it was not until the 1970s that the Court clarified that searches are reasonable if, under a "totality of the circumstances", the search is "voluntary". Courts generally look to whether officers believed, at the time of the search, the individual being searched provided voluntary consent. Officers may also rely on the consent of someone who reasonably appears to have authority to consent to a police search, even if that person actually has no such authority. However, if officers obtain consent after engaging in an unconstitutional seizure, the consent is considered "tainted" and evidence obtained from such a search cannot be admitted during a subsequent criminal prosecution.

In Schneckloth v. Bustamonte, the United States Supreme Court established a framework for determining whether a suspect's consent is voluntary. The Court noted that historically, when "determining whether a defendant's will was overborne in a particular case, the Court has assessed the totality of all the surrounding circumstances—both the characteristics of the accused and the details of the interrogation". Consequently, the Court held that voluntariness should be determined "from the totality of all the circumstances". The Court also clarified that judges should examine the "possibly vulnerable subjective state of the person who consents" to determine whether a suspect was coerced into consenting, and "account must be taken of subtly coercive police questions". However, the Court also held that suspects may still give valid consent even if they do not know that they can refuse to consent to the search.

=== Fourth Amendment searches and seizures on buses ===
The United States Supreme Court first clarified the applicability of the Fourth Amendment to searches and seizures on buses in the 1991 case Florida v. Bostick, where the Court held that police officers may approach bus passengers on a random basis and ask questions and request their consent to searches, "provided a reasonable person would understand that he or she is free to refuse". The Court rejected the argument that police questioning on board a bus constitutes a per se seizure under the Fourth Amendment, and instead held that courts should use a "totality of the circumstances" test to determine whether a passenger would have felt "free to decline the officers' requests or otherwise terminate the encounter", or whether a passenger was free "to ignore the police presence and go about his business". Additionally, the Court ruled that even if law enforcement officers have no basis for suspecting individuals are engaged in criminal activity, officers may still approach passengers, ask them questions, request identification, and request consent to search luggage, so long as officers do not coerce passengers to cooperate with their efforts.

== Arrest and trial of Christopher Drayton and Clifton Brown, Jr. ==
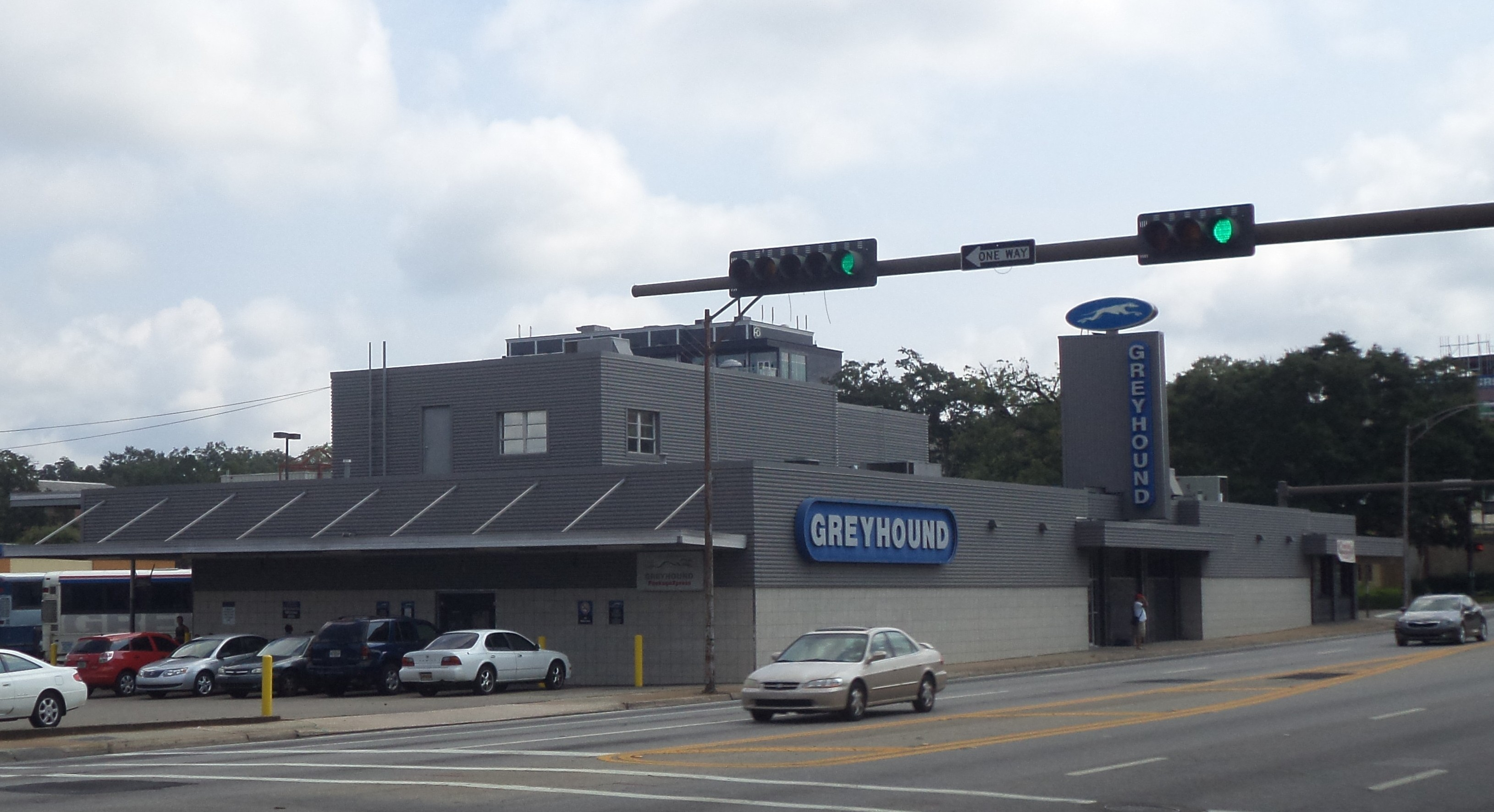
The Tallahassee, Florida Greyhound station, where police inspected the bus on which Drayton and Brown were traveling.

On February 4, 1999, Christopher Drayton and Clifton Brown, Jr. were traveling on a Greyhound bus bound for Detroit, Michigan. When the bus made a planned stop in Tallahassee, Florida, passengers were told to get off the bus so it could be cleaned and refueled. After the passengers re-boarded, the driver allowed Officers Blackburn, Hoover, and Lang of the Tallahassee Police Department to enter the bus "as part of a routine drug and weapons interdiction effort". Although the officers displayed visible badges, they carried concealed weapons and were not in uniform. Upon entering the bus, Officer Hoover knelt on the driver's seat, Officer Blackburn stood at the back of the bus, and Officer Lang walked along the aisle of the bus to talk to passengers. He asked passengers which luggage was theirs and where they were going. None of the officers blocked the aisle or otherwise obstructed the exit, and passengers were free to leave while the officers conducted their investigation. However, the officers did not inform passengers of their right to refuse to cooperate with the investigation.

Drayton and Brown sat next to each other on the bus, Drayton by the aisle and Brown by the window. When Officer Lang arrived at their row, he identified himself as a police investigator and showed his badge. In a voice "just loud enough" to hear, he said he was a police officer "conducting bus interdiction [sic], attempting to deter drugs and illegal weapons being transported on the bus". When Lang asked Drayton and Brown if they had any luggage on the bus, they both pointed to the same green bag on the overhead luggage rack. Lang asked, "[d]o you mind if I check it?", and Brown replied, "[g]o ahead". The officers inspected the bag and discovered no contraband inside.

Officer Lang observed that Drayton and Brown were wearing "heavy jackets and baggy pants", despite warm weather that day. Lang suspected Brown and Drayton might have been using their baggy clothing to conceal weapons or drugs, so he asked Brown, "[d]o you mind if I check your person?" Brown responded, "[s]ure", leaned up in his seat, removed a cellular phone from his pocket, and opened his jacket. Lang patted down the outside of his clothing and felt small packages "similar to drug packages detected on other occasions". Officer Lang then arrested Brown, handcuffed him, and Officer Hoover walked him off the bus. Lang then asked Drayton, "[m]ind if I check you?", to which Drayton responded "by lifting his hands about eight inches from his legs". Lang detected similar objects during a pat down of Drayton's legs, placed him under arrest, and escorted him off the bus. A further search determined that Brown had duct-taped three bundles containing 483 grams of cocaine between several layers of boxer shorts, and Drayton had duct-taped two bundles between several layers of boxer shorts containing 295 grams of cocaine.

=== Trial in the United States District Court for the Northern District of Florida ===
Drayton and Brown were charged with conspiring to distribute cocaine and possession with the intent to distribute cocaine, in violation of 21 U.S.C. §§ 841(a)(1) and 846. At trial, Drayton and Brown filed a motion to suppress the cocaine on the grounds that their consent to the search of their clothing was invalid. The United States District Court for the Northern District of Florida denied their motion, finding that "the police conduct was not coercive and respondents' consent to the search was voluntary". The District Court found that officers did not block the exit of the bus, and it was "obvious" that Drayton and Brown were free to leave the bus. Consequently, the District Court concluded that the encounter was "cooperative", and there was "nothing coercive" or "confrontational" about the encounter.

=== Appeal to the United States Court of Appeals for the Eleventh Circuit ===
The United States Court of Appeals for the Eleventh Circuit reversed the decision of the District Court, holding that the cocaine should have been suppressed and that Drayton and Brown's convictions should be reversed. The Eleventh Circuit stated that its holding was compelled by circuit precedent, which held that bus passengers do not feel free to decline police officers' requests to search without "some positive indication that consent could have been refused". Applying circuit precedent to the facts of the case, the Eleventh Circuit concluded that Drayton and Brown were not aware that they could have refused the search, and the evidence discovered through the pat down must be excluded at trial. The Eleventh Circuit emphasized that officers gave no reassurances that passengers were free to leave, and the fact that an officer stood next to the exit "might make a reasonable person feel less free to leave the bus". On January 4, 2002, the Supreme Court of the United States granted certiorari to review the decision of the Eleventh Circuit.

== Opinion of the Court ==
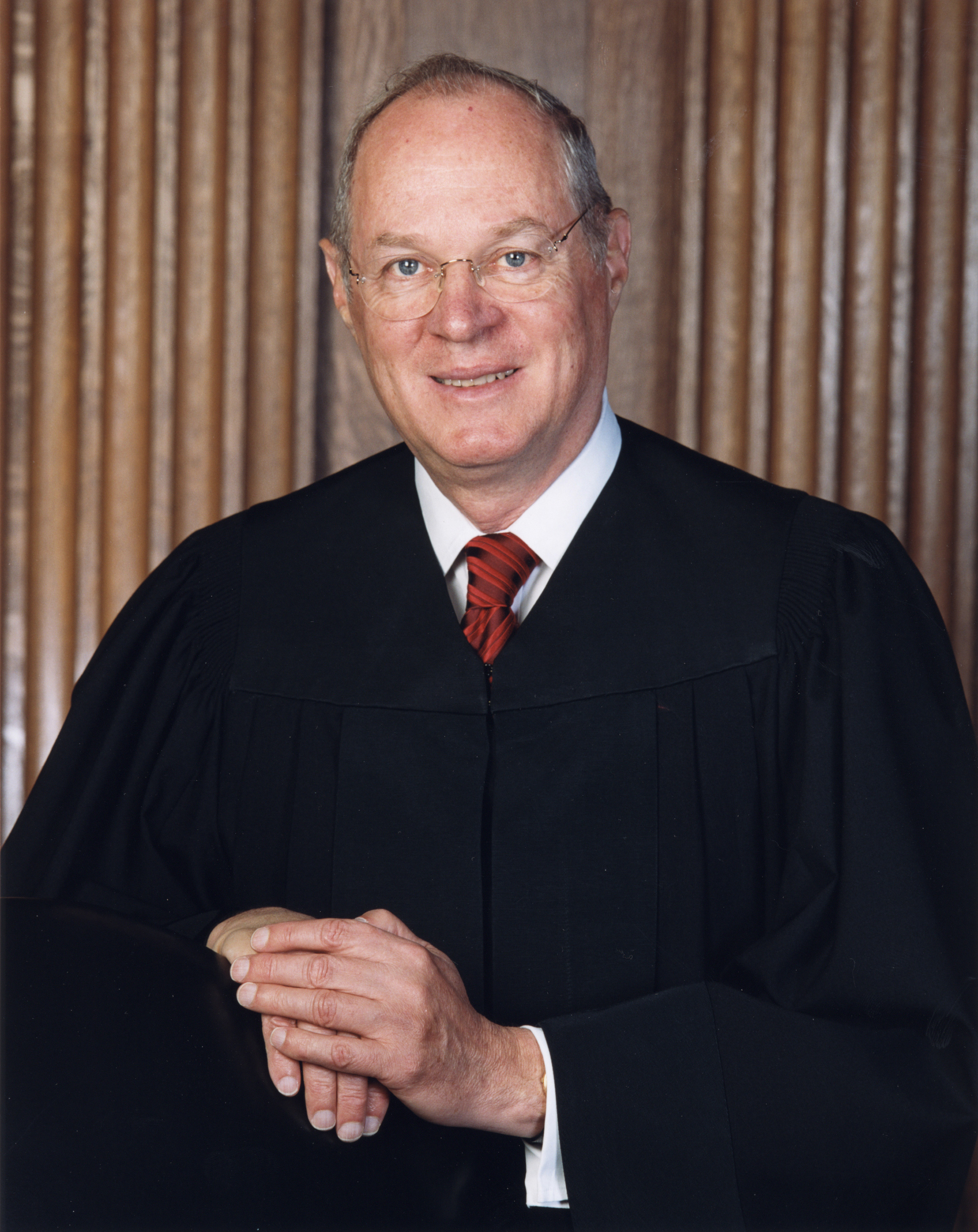
In his majority opinion, Justice Anthony Kennedy (pictured) emphasized that "in a society based on law, the concept of agreement and consent should be given a weight and dignity of its own".

Writing for a majority of the Court, Justice Anthony Kennedy held that Drayton and Brown were not seized and their consent to the search was voluntary. He explained that "[l]aw enforcement officers do not violate the Fourth Amendment's prohibition of unreasonable seizures merely by approaching individuals on the street or in other public places and putting questions to them if they are willing to listen". Additionally, Justice Kennedy emphasized that "[i]f a reasonable person would feel free to terminate the encounter, then he or she has not been seized". Citing the Court's analytic framework established in Florida v. Bostick, Justice Kennedy concluded that a reasonable person would have felt free to "leav[e] the bus or otherwise terminat[e] the encounter". Justice Kennedy noted that the officers did not brandish weapons, they did not make "intimidating movements", they left the aisle clear, and they "spoke to passengers one by one and in a polite, quiet voice". He noted that "[i]t is beyond question that had this encounter occurred on the street, it would be constitutional", and the fact that the encounter occurred on a bus does not make it illegal.

Justice Kennedy rejected Drayton's argument that officers coerced passengers by showing their badges, noting that the sight of police officers should be a "cause for assurance, not discomfort". Likewise, he rejected the argument that placing an officer near the door of the bus constituted a seizure, because the officer "did nothing to intimidate passengers" and "left the aisle clear". Justice Kennedy also held that the nature of the encounter did not change after Brown was arrested, because "[t]he arrest of one person does not mean that everyone around him has been seized by police". Rather, witnessing Brown's arrest "should have put Drayton on notice of the consequences of continuing the encounter by answering the officers' questions".

Furthermore, Justice Kennedy held the searches were not unreasonable because both Drayton and Brown voluntarily consented to the suspicionless search. He noted that police officers need not inform citizens of their right to refuse when conducting a search and that the Court has traditionally applied a "totality of the circumstances" test when determining whether a search is "unreasonable". Because officers requested consent to search Drayton and Brown, Justice Kennedy concluded the search was consensual and voluntary. Justice Kennedy also mentioned in dicta that, absent consent, officers likely had reasonable suspicion to conduct a Terry stop. Consequently, Justice Kennedy ordered the case to be remanded to Eleventh Circuit for reconsideration in light of the Supreme Court's decision.

=== Dissenting opinion of Justice Souter ===
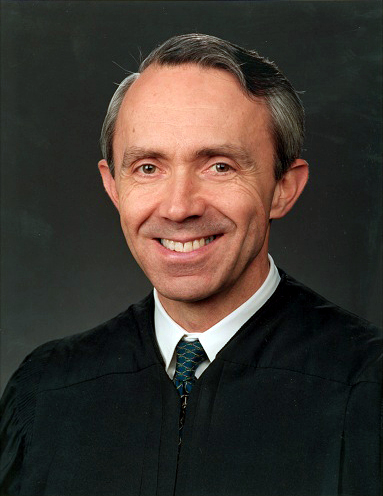
In his dissenting opinion, Justice David Souter (pictured) compared the encounter in the bus to a "scene in a narrow alley."

Justice David Souter wrote a dissenting opinion in which he argued that the cocaine should have been suppressed because Drayton and Brown would not have felt free to leave the bus and they likely were not aware that they could have refused consent to the search. He noted that "[t]he commonplace precautions of air travel have not, thus far, been justified for ground transportation" and that "no such conditions have been placed on passengers getting on trains or buses". Additionally, Justice Souter argued that police officers "exercise power free from immediate check, and when the attention of several officers is brought to bear on one civilian the imbalance of immediate power is unmistakable". He argued that this imbalance of power may rise to a "threatening" level, which "may overbear a normal person's ability to act freely, even in the absence of explicit commands or the formalities of detention".

After analyzing the encounter between Drayton, Brown, and the police, Justice Souter concluded that the interdiction "was not a consensual exercise". He argued that the manner in which the police conducted the interdiction created an "atmosphere of obligatory participation". He concluded that Drayton and Brown were "pinned-in by the officers", and that "it was reasonable to suppose no passenger would tend to his own business until the officers were ready to let him". Consequently, Justice Souter concluded that officers engaged in "threatening" behavior that constituted an unreasonable, non-consensual search and seizure.

== Subsequent developments ==
On remand, the United States Court of Appeals for the Eleventh Circuit issued a per curiam opinion affirming Drayton and Brown's convictions. Five years after issuing its opinion in Drayton, the Supreme Court of the United States offered further clarification of the meaning of "coercion" in Brendlin v. California. Writing for a unanimous Court, Justice Souter cited Bostick and Drayton to hold that coercion should be judged according to the experiences of a "reasonable person" in the situation. He wrote, "when a person has no desire to leave for reasons unrelated to the police presence, the coercive effect of the encounter can be measured better by asking whether a reasonable person would feel free to decline the officers’ requests or otherwise terminate the encounter".

=== Interpretation by Circuit Courts of Appeals ===
Some Circuit Courts have applied the Court's ruling in Drayton to hold that citizens are not coerced when police officers approach individuals on the street and ask them questions. The District of Columbia Circuit, for example, wrote that "while the passengers in Drayton were questioned while inside a bus with an officer positioned near the exit ... the street encounter [posed] no physical impediment to [the suspect]’s freedom to walk away". However, the Seventh Circuit has held that according to the Supreme Court's ruling in Drayton, a suspect was unlawfully detained when police approached him in a dark alley and asked him questions. The Seventh Circuit described the encounter as "coercive" and distinguished it from the events that transpired in Drayton because "[a]lleys are distinguishable from the sorts of open, populated spaces in which police questioning is typically deemed consensual". The court noted that "'a reasonable person may feel ... more secure in his or her decision not to cooperate with police on a bus than in other circumstances' because 'many fellow passengers are present [on a bus] to witness officers’ conduct'".

== Analysis and commentary ==
In the years following the Court's ruling in Drayton, scholars have offered a range of opinions about the case's impact and significance. Some analysts have suggested that Drayton reflects a concern among members of the Court for "ensuring that individuals retain the power to stand up for their rights". However, other scholars, such as Tracey Maclin, argue that Justice Kennedy improperly assumed that citizens will always feel free to refuse consent, and that many citizens cooperate with the police because of "fear of police reprisal if they don't". Criminal law scholar Janice Nadler commented that Justice Kennedy's conclusions were products of "intuitive reflections on [his and the other Justices'] own experience and about the imagined experience of other citizens". Additionally, Ric Simmons criticized the Court's ruling for failing to reflect the realities of "real-life confrontations occurring on the street" between citizens and law enforcement. Other scholars, such as Thomas W. Hughes and Joshua Fitch, argued that the Court's decision in Drayton would impact the balance between individual liberties and heightened national security interests in the wake of the September 11 attacks.

Jeremy R. Jehangiri criticized the Court's ruling for failing to account for psychological pressures inherent in the "perceived legitimacy of the [police's] authority". Jehangiri argued that police should be required to inform citizens that consent is voluntary, and that this kind of "prophylactic warning would serve as a natural corollary to a Miranda warning mandated by the Fifth Amendment". Likewise, Marissa Reich also argued that passengers feel significant "psychological pressures" to cooperate with police searches on buses, and police should therefore warn passengers that consent is voluntary. Joshua Fitch also criticized the Court for ignoring the impact of "racial disparagement" with respect to an individual's ability to walk away from encounters with police. He argued that "[g]iven the historical treatment of black males by members of law enforcement, it is entirely possible that Drayton and Brown feared refusing the officers' requests because they feared violent consequences". Fitch also argued that police should provide warnings similar to Miranda warnings that "inform citizens of their right to refuse consent", and that decisions like Drayton "consistently [endorse] rules that require citizens to fend for themselves when it comes to constitutional rights".

=== Departure from Bustamonte's subjective framework ===
Scholars have observed that Justice Kennedy's majority opinion "embraced Bustamonte's premise that when police request consent to search, the request itself carries the implication that an alternative of refusal exists". Other scholars, such as Ric Simmons, have noted that Drayton reflects "the Court at the midpoint of this evolution, moving from a subjective binary test that focuses on whether or not the subject acted voluntarily, to a more nuanced objective test that focuses on the amount of compulsion used by the law enforcement officer". Additionally, Matthew Phillips wrote that Drayton "illustrates the metamorphosis of the totality-of-the-circumstances test into a purely objective test" because Justice Kennedy's opinion "did not explicitly consider any subjective factors" with respect to whether Drayton and Brown felt they could deny consent when questioned by the police. Phillips suggested that the decision to abandon subjective factors could lead to "bizarre results" in cases, like this, where "circumstances of the search indicate at least some level of coercion".

== See also ==
- List of United States Supreme Court cases, volume 536
- List of United States Supreme Court cases
- Lists of United States Supreme Court cases by volume
- List of United States Supreme Court cases by the Rehnquist Court
