= Terry stop =

Brief detainment by police in the United States

A Terry stop in the United States allows the police to briefly detain a person based on reasonable suspicion of involvement in criminal activity. Reasonable suspicion is a lower standard than probable cause which is needed for arrest. When police stop and pat down a pedestrian, this is commonly known as a stop and frisk. When police stop an automobile, this is known as a traffic stop. If the police stop a motor vehicle on minor infringements in order to investigate other suspected criminal activity, this is known as a pretextual stop.

In the United States at the federal level, the Supreme Court has decided many cases that define the intersection between policing and the Fourth Amendment protection against unreasonable searches and seizures. However, Congress has not defined a baseline for police behavior. There has been some state action at both the legislative and judicial levels, and also some cities have passed laws on these issues.

Some law academics are concerned that jurisprudence permitting Terry stops does not account for possible implicit bias of officers, and that this possibly results in racially skewed decision-making. Communities that have high rates of incarceration may experience more intense and punitive policing and surveillance practices even during periods of time when general crime rates are decreasing.

== Origins ==
Terry v. Ohio used only the "reasonableness clause" from the Fourth Amendment
The right of the people to be secure in their persons, houses, papers, and effects, against unreasonable searches and seizures, shall not be violated,...	Reasonableness
...and no Warrants shall issue, but upon probable cause, supported by Oath or affirmation, and particularly describing the place to be searched, and the persons or things to be seized.	Warrant

The concept of a Terry stop originated in the 1968 Supreme Court case Terry v. Ohio, in which a police officer detained three Cleveland men on the street behaving suspiciously, as if they were preparing for armed robbery. The police conducted a pat down search and discovered a revolver, and subsequently, two of the men were convicted of carrying a concealed weapon. The men appealed their case to the Supreme Court, arguing that the search in which the revolver was found was illegal under the Fourth Amendment. This brief detention and search were deemed permissible by the court, judging that the officer had reasonable suspicion which could be articulated (not just a hunch) that the person detained may be armed and dangerous. This was not mere "suspicion" but "reasonable suspicion" which could be articulated at a later date.

This decision was made during a period of great social unrest in the United States in the 1960s, with rising crime, opposition to U.S. involvement in the Vietnam War and the civil rights movement, and race riots. It was thought that law enforcement needed to be provided with tools to deal with the unrest and new issues of urban crime. Some criticized the decision for watering down the prohibition against unreasonable searches and seizures; others praised it for balancing safety and individual rights.

== Elements ==
The United States Supreme Court held that where: a police officer observes unusual conduct by a subject; the subject's conduct leads the officer reasonably to conclude that criminal activity may be afoot, and that the subject may be armed and presently dangerous; the officer identifies themselves as a police officer; the officer makes reasonable inquiries; and nothing in the initial stages of the encounter serves to dispel the officer's reasonable fear for safety, the officer may conduct a carefully limited search of the outer clothing of the subject in an attempt to discover weapons, and that such a search is a reasonable search under the Fourteenth Amendment, so that any weapons seized may properly be introduced in evidence.

== Expansion through case law ==
=== Reasonable suspicion ===
To possess reasonable suspicion that would justify a stop, police must have "specific and articulable facts" that indicate that the person to be stopped is, or is about to be, engaged in criminal activity. Because officers usually do not have supervision when they encounter civilians, they have discretion regarding whom to stop. Reasonable suspicion depends on the "totality of the circumstances". Reasonable suspicion is a vague term, and the Supreme Court concluded that it is to be decided on a case-by-case basis. It often arises from a combination of facts, each of which would, in itself, not be enough justification for the stop.

Types of police-civilian encounters
Consensual encounter	Requires neither probable cause nor reasonable suspicion
Terry stop (investigative detention)	Requires reasonable suspicion
Arrest	Requires probable cause

The suspicion must be that of an individual person. Police officers primarily use situational factors based on criminal behavior to determine whether a stop is needed. In essence, when they witness a person behaving suspiciously or violating the law, they are constitutionally permitted to stop them. Other factors informing the decision include personal attitudes and the decision-making model in effect where the officer works. These subjective influences naturally create the opportunity for bias on the part of police officers who possess animus toward a certain class of people.

The three types of primary sources that courts should accept in order to determine suspiciousness are information obtained from third parties, information based on the suspect's appearance and behavior and the time and place of the suspected offense. Officers can define what they believe is normal, and if and how the suspect deviates from this. Reasonable suspicion has been used for actions such as standing in the wrong place, nervousness, exceptional calmness or walking quickly in another direction. Officers' experiences may make them suspicious of behavior that is usually innocuous. For instance, a social interaction such as a hug or a handshake might be perceived as a drug deal. Merely identifying that a person belongs to a broad category, such as physical location, race, ethnicity or profile, is insufficient for reasonable suspicion. However, stop-and-frisk has been validated on the basis of furtive movements, inappropriate attire, carrying objects such as a television or a pillowcase (in English law, "going equipped"), vague, nonspecific answers to routine questions, refusal to identify oneself and appearing to be out of place.

Before 1968, the law required substantial evidence to impede liberty or seize property. However, the Fourth Amendment does not protect consensual encounters. In its Terry decision, the Supreme Court found that the police should have the power to search, even without probable cause, to protect themselves from weapons. The Terry stop operates under the assumption that although stop-and-frisk is an intrusion, the potential harm from weapons outweighs it.

The cases following Terry expanded the power of the police. While the original case was concerned with armed violence and firsthand observation by officers, Adams v. Williams (1972) extended the doctrine to drug possession substantiated by the secondhand hearsay of an informant. The Adams v. Williams case set a precedent that police are not required to directly observe suspicious behavior if their reasonable suspicion is based upon information provided by a confidential informant. Regarding the case, Justice Marshall stated: "Today's decision invokes the specter of a society in which innocent citizens may be stopped, searched, and arrested at the whim of police officers who have only the slightest suspicion of improper conduct." United States v. Hensley (1985) ruled that police officers may stop and question suspects whom they recognize from "wanted" flyers issued by other police departments. In Illinois v. Wardlow (2000), a person's unprovoked flight from Chicago police officers in "an area known for heavy narcotics trafficking" constituted reasonable suspicion to stop him.

During Terry stops, police usually ask detainees to identify themselves. Several states require people to provide their names to the police upon request. In Hiibel v. Sixth Judicial District Court of Nevada (2004), these stop-and-identify statutes were deemed constitutional. While the specifics of stop-and-identify statutes and ordinances vary, a significant number of states and local jurisdictions have enacted such laws. In New York, courts have limited the effects of Terry by creating a four-level continuum of intrusion, each of which requires its own level of suspicion. This allows police officers to detain people if the officers possess an articulable and objectively credible reason. In People v. DeBour, New York's highest court permitted the police to stop a person who simply crosses the street upon observing the police.

Lacking reasonable suspicion, police may stop a person based on a hunch, constituting a consensual stop. United States v. Mendenhall found that police are not generally required to advise an individual that the stop is on a consensual basis nor that the person may leave at any time. A person can typically determine whether a stop is consensual by asking, "Am I free to go?". If the officer responds in the negative or does not respond, the person is being detained under a Terry stop; otherwise, the person may leave. Mendenhall also found that a consensual stop can be converted into an unconstitutional Terry stop by circumstances such as "the threatening presence of several officers, the display of a weapon by an officer, some physical touching of the person of the citizen, or the use of language or tone of voice indicating that compliance with the officer's request might be compelled." Police who conduct an unconstitutional Terry stop can face administrative discipline and civil suits.

In Pennsylvania v. Mimms, two police officers issued Mimms a ticket for driving a car with an expired license plate. When they asked him to step out, they realized that he had a gun, and promptly arrested him. The court ruled in favor of the police, citing officer safety as their reason. Dissenting justices found that this furthers the expansion of Terry. They feared that the ruling set a precedent that officers could ask citizens to perform actions through warrantless intrusion.

=== Search ===
A frisk, also known as a pat-down, of the surface of a suspect's garments is permitted during a Terry stop but must be limited to actions necessary to discover weapons and must be based on a reasonable suspicion the individual may be armed. However, pursuant to the plain-feel doctrine (similar to the plain-view doctrine), police may seize contraband discovered in the course of a frisk, but only if the type of contraband is immediately apparent.

The Supreme Court has placed very liberal requirements on what is "immediately apparent" regarding contraband. In an example provided by the Federal Law Enforcement Training Centers, an officer feels a hard pack of cigarettes while frisking a suspect and inspects the pack, discovering drugs inside. The officer is legally permitted to open the pack because he has prior knowledge, based on experience, that a small switchblade or tiny gun could be hidden in such a box.

Subsequent court cases have expanded the definition of what constitutes a frisk and what is considered as admissible evidence. In Michigan v. Long, Terry stops were extended to searching the inside of a car passenger compartment if police have reasonable suspicion that an occupant may have access to a weapon there. In Minnesota v. Dickerson, the court ruled that "immediately recognized" contraband discovered during a Terry stop is also a lawful seizure.

==== Consensual search ====
Based on the Supreme Court decision in Schneckloth v. Bustamonte (1972), a person waives Fourth Amendment protections when voluntarily consenting to a search. Police are not required to inform a person of their right to decline the search. Justice Marshall, in his dissent, wrote that it is a "curious result that one can choose to relinquish a constitutional right—the right to be free from unreasonable searches—without knowing that he has the alternative of refusing to accede to a police request." Several cities and states require police to inform citizens of their right to deny a search.

== Traffic stops ==
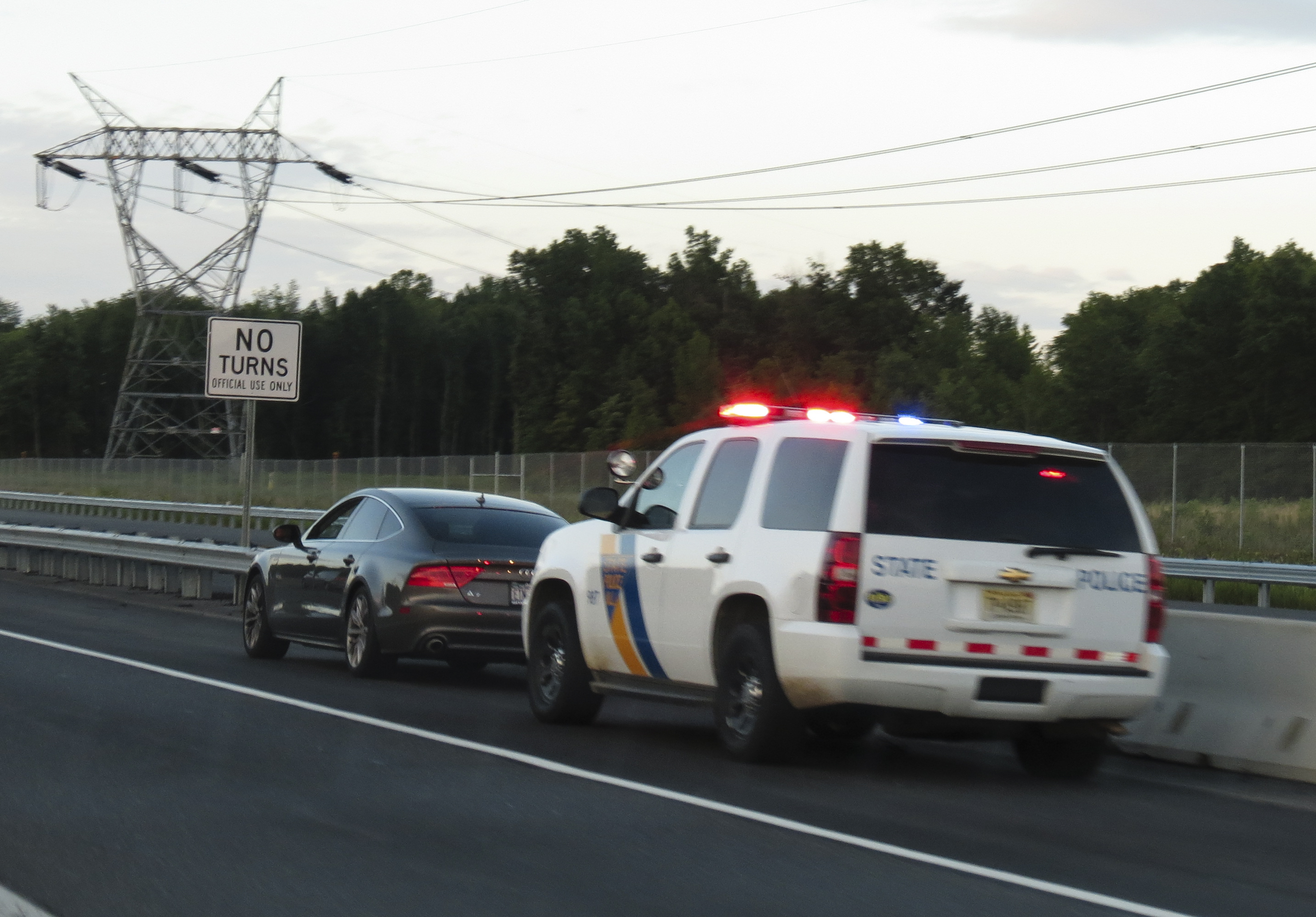
New Jersey State Police officer conducting a traffic stop on the New Jersey Turnpike

For practical purposes, a traffic stop is essentially the same as a Terry stop; for the duration of a stop, driver and passengers are "seized" within the meaning of the Fourth Amendment. The Supreme Court has held that drivers and passengers may be ordered to exit the vehicle without violating the Fourth Amendment's proscription of unreasonable searches and seizures. Drivers and passengers may be frisked for weapons upon reasonable suspicion they are armed and dangerous. If police reasonably suspect the driver or any of the occupants may be dangerous and that the vehicle may contain a weapon to which an occupant may gain access, police may perform a protective search of the passenger compartment. Otherwise, lacking a warrant or the driver's consent, police may not search the vehicle, but under the plain-view doctrine may seize and use as evidence weapons or contraband that are visible from outside the vehicle.

As decided in Ohio v. Robinette (1996), after an officer returns the driver's identification, there is no requirement that the officer inform the driver of their freedom to leave; therefore, although the encounter has changed to a consensual encounter, questioning can continue, including a request to search the vehicle.

== Pretextual stops ==
Pretextual stops are a subset of traffic stops deemed constitutional by the Supreme Court in Whren v. United States (1996). They occur when a police officer wishes to investigate a motorist on other suspicions, generally related to drug possession, and uses a minor traffic infringement as a pretext to stop the driver. In the case of Whren, the defense used a "would-have" rule, asking whether a reasonable police officer would have made the stop without the suspicion of other criminal behavior. Some consider that pretextual stops can allow racial profiling to occur. There are numerous petty violations that a typical driver might commit, and the officer can be selective about whom to detain for questioning. Sixteen states ban pretextual stops that are based solely upon racial profiling or other immutable factors:

- Arizona
- Arkansas
- California
- Colorado
- Connecticut
- Kansas
- Maryland
- Mississippi
- Montana
- Nebraska
- New Jersey
- New Mexico
- Oklahoma
- Rhode Island
- Utah
- West Virginia

== Racial disparities ==
Police officers may develop schemas after continuously being exposed to certain environments, like high-crime minority neighborhoods, which can lead to their association of crime with race instead of focusing on suspicious behavior. Officers who have been in the police force for longer are more likely to have suspicions based on non-behavioral reasons. Forms of American culture that perpetuate negative stereotypes, such as black people being violent or white people committing white-collar crimes, can theoretically cause people to act on these stereotypes, even if they do not believe them, making implicit bias a possible factor in arrests. Some argue that Black and Hispanic people are more likely to be targeted and are more likely to be stopped than population and relative crime rates might suggest.

Terry stop regulations vary by area. Areas with high crime, such as public housing, might require less evidence for someone to be stopped. This places the inhabitants of the area at greater risk for detainment. In areas that are perceived to have high crimes, more police are deployed, which results in higher arrest rates, which are then used to justify more policing. When controlling for location-based stops, one study found that white people were more likely to have a weapon than are black or Hispanic people. Another study determined that the same proportion of racial groups were stopped during the day and at night, suggesting that stop decisions were not based on the physical appearance of the driver. However, the study was interpreted to suggest that black people are more likely to be detained for longer periods of time. The National Research Council states that "more research is needed on the complex interplay of race, ethnicity, and other social factors in police-citizen interactions."

One study suggested a 27% increase in the likelihood of black people experiencing force during a stop compared to a white person, and a 28% increase in likelihood that the officer would draw their gun. The study also determined that even during consensual stops, blacks are 29% more likely to experience force than other racial groups. Young people were found more likely to experience force compared to older people. In New York City between 1996 and 2000, there was a disproportionate number of complaints by blacks about officers' use of force. Governmental and nongovernmental organizations investigations have confirmed that police-perpetrated abuse has affected many people of all races. Another study blamed variances in types of nonverbal communication among races as a factor influencing some officers' suspicions.

A 2009 study theorized that police officers could use their power to enforce their masculinity. Because most police officers and detainees are men, officers are susceptible to the culture of honor stance and hypermasculinity, in which they are more prone to physical aggression in order to protect their social standing.

A 2015 study concluded that immigration does not have a positive correlation with crime, but that immigrants are disproportionately stopped and arrested, leading to distrust of law enforcement. The study also argued that immigrants typically possess less awareness of how to behave when stopped by the police. After being stopped more often, immigrants may hold distrust towards the police.

== Effects ==
=== Use of force ===
The experience of minority citizens, who are both more likely to be stopped by police and more likely to experience the use of force by the police after being stopped, has been characterized as a racial or ethnic "double jeopardy". Acts of police force cause injury, death, civil litigation, public outrage, civil disorder, and a distrust towards the police.

Eric Garner and NYPD, Freddie Gray and the Baltimore police, and Michael Brown and the Ferguson police are notable examples of police force at Terry stops that ended tragically. Eric Garner was suspected of selling loose cigarettes in the streets. He was confronted by the NYPD and was put into a chokehold by one of the officers. He repeated that he could not breathe, lost consciousness, and later was pronounced dead. Though the situation was caught on camera, the grand jury declined to indict the officer who issued the chokehold. With blatant proof of excessive force but no consequence, this was a tipping point for an uprising against the NYPD and its use of force. Although racial disparities in the frequency of Terry stops are well known, less is known about the nature, prevalence, and factors predictive of use of force during Terry stops.

Morrow et al. studied NYPD's SQF (stop, question, and frisk) records in 2010 to determine the frequency of force used at stops and whether the citizen's race/ethnicity was a factor in the decision to use force. SQF tactics were found to disproportionately target minorities, regardless of control over variables like social and economic factors, precinct crime rates, and neighborhood racial or ethnic composition. SQF tactics did not seem to actually address crime either, as only 6% of stops yielded an arrest and only 0.15% of stops yielded a gun. In 2013, 44% of young minority New Yorkers had been stopped by NYPD nine or more times.

Using the US Census Bureau's data from 2012, Morrow et al. analyzed racial/ethnic disparities in the use of force among NYPD. Force was classified as hands, suspect on ground, suspect against wall, weapon drawn, weapon pointed, baton, handcuffs, pepper spray, and other; these were then categorized as no force, physical/non-weapon force, and weapon force. They found that non-weapon force occurred in 14.1% of SQF. However, when this was further separated by racial categories, while for whites, only 0.9% experienced non-weapon force, 7.6% blacks and 5.0% Hispanics experienced non-weapon force, eight to nine times more likely than whites. There is a possibility that these results are due to implicit biases of police officers, which could be shaped by previous experiences in the workforce.

=== Psychological and emotional harm ===
A stop and frisk can be damaging to communities. Kwate and Threadcraft argue that stop and frisk is a public health problem and works to "produce bodies that are harassed, stressed and resource deprived, if not altogether dead". Stop and frisk creates an environment of fear that alters the behaviors of a community's inhabitants and limits their freedom of action. The police conduct pat-downs that intrude upon the privacy of the individual, and can result in escalation through physical or sexual violence. During this process, officers sometimes use profanity and discriminatory slurs. Because of this, residents often have anger, fear, or distrust towards the police.

For those with mental disorders and disabilities, pat-downs can be traumatic, especially for those with sensory disorders. Those who have suffered through sexual trauma, which is prevalent among men with criminal justice histories and black people in poorer urban areas, can relive their trauma through the invasive procedure, resulting in stress, depression, and anxiety. This practice also increases the possibility of sexual exploitation or assault, especially in communities that are more vulnerable, like black and poor sex workers and sex trafficking victims. Because ways of transporting drugs have evolved, some police officers utilize methods such as stripping the civilian and searching their body for drugs, which can be traumatizing for both users and nonusers of drugs. Civilians have also reported that police officers often wait until their quota is filled up to bring the arrested civilians back to stations. Civilians must stay in the back of the van, which often was missing seats, for hours on end and packed with 15 or 16 people, without access to the bathroom.

In a study conducted by Cooper et al., young men who do not use drugs stated that they feel uncomfortable when stopped by a police officer because they were afraid that "unnecessary violence or life disruption was imminent during every police stop". Those who have been stopped more often develop more allostatic load, resulting in low self esteem and despair. When residents of a community know they are being treated both unfairly, and unfairly due to their social identity, they are more likely to anticipate stigma and rejection due to their race. Marginalized communities that experience recurring injustice from the police distrust them and become more cynical of them, resulting in legal cynicism, which in turn results in decreased cooperation and respect toward the legal system. This loss of faith in the system causes depressed civic and political engagement. Community residents are less likely to call for the police to help when they believe the police are not on their side, instead turning towards other community members. This distrust towards police is passed down from generation to generation, otherwise known as legal socialization, as a means of protection, forcing the community to live in perpetual fear.

Items that are discovered during pat-downs that are incriminating, like clean needles, condoms, and other harm reduction tools, are used less to prevent arrest; this then is a danger to public health.

== Solutions ==
Many police departments all over the country have adapted courtesy policing as a response to criticism of racial profiling and police violence. Courtesy policing is when the police build rapport with the community through respect and friendliness. Legitimacy policing is a method used by police officers to interact with the community, where, in order to achieve a desired outcome, police officers utilize both punitive and courtesy strategies. While courtesy policing is used to gain trust and collect information, the punitive approach is used whenever it appears that the stopped people did not comply, making the police more aggressive; these approaches are adapted on a shifting continuum to the actions of the people they stop. People of color are more likely to see this community policing as degrading.

Cooper believes that in order to address hypermasculinity, which increases physical aggression in the police force, officers should be taught to not use command presence (where they use an authoritative tone of voice or even become physically violent) in situations where it is not needed. It should still be used when the officer is in a dangerous situation, but not when a situation does not require force. Instead of the officer punishing the harm doer, the officer should instead make it a goal to have a full understanding of the situation. Police training culture should not emphasize aggressive approaches and instead advocate for a more patient approach. An emphasis should be put on how to communicate with civilians who challenge their authority. Officers should also be made aware of any potential biases they may have.

Terry was originally created to prevent imminent armed robberies. However, 90% of individuals who are stop-and-frisked in New York City were free to leave afterwards. This demonstrates that they were not about to do serious criminal activity, which goes against Terry's purpose of preventing serious crime. Hutchins wishes to narrow the scope of Terry, and prevent certain police encounters from happening in the first place, and proposes to limit the reach of Terry stops so that officers may not stop someone based on a possessory offense under nothing more than reasonable suspicion. Goel calls for the optimization of stop relating to criminal possession of a weapon (CPW). Because having a lower threshold of evidence to stop someone disproportionately affects black and Hispanic people, optimization would result in less racial disparities for Terry stops. Goel examines NYPD's three million stops for cases where the stop yielded an individual involved with criminal possession of a weapon. In approximately 43% of these stops, there was less than 1% of a chance that the suspect had a weapon. Goel found that five stop circumstances are more likely to increase the likelihood of recovering a weapon for a stop: suspicious weapon, sights and sounds of criminal activity, suspicious bulge, witness report, and ongoing investigation.

Kwate and Threadcraft advocate for three ways to address Stop and Frisk, as a public health issue. First, they believe the health department's citywide health surveys should include Stop and Frisk encounters, so that the data can be used to investigate health outcomes of a Stop and Frisk. Second, within 24 hours, reports of traumatic stops should be received by the city. Third, a registry should be created in which communities can report police encounters. Torres calls for more comprehensive data in stop and frisk reports. Specifically, since Latinos can also be white and black, current data is not as accurate.

== Data collection ==
The following states require stop-and-frisk data collection:

- Alabama (Note: Require this data to be published (including Kansas))
- California
- Connecticut
- Florida
- Illinois
- Louisiana
- Maryland
- Massachusetts
- Minnesota
- Missouri
- Montana
- North Carolina
- Nebraska
- Nevada
- Rhode Island
- Texas
- Washington
- West Virginia

Using public record requests, the Stanford Open Policing project amassed 60 million state traffic stops in 20 states over the period 2011 through 2015.

North Carolina was the first state in the country to require the release of all traffic stop data starting in 2000. Researchers have analysed 20 million traffic stops from this data finding that African Americans as a share of the population were twice as likely to be pulled over than whites and four times as likely to be searched. Hispanics were not more likely to be pulled over, but had a higher likelihood of being searched.

There is a push to release more open police data nationwide. In 2015, the White House launched the Police Data Initiative which, as of 2018, has 130 participating police departments, some of which provide data sets on stop-and-frisk. The 130 departments cover 15% of the population.

== See also ==
- Consent search case law
- Kavanaugh stop
- Carding
- Stop-and-frisk in New York City
- Sus law
- Powers of the police in England and Wales § Search without arrest
