= Brendlin v. California =

- Supreme Court of the United States

Argued April 23, 2007 Decided June 18, 2007
- Full case name: Bruce Edward Brendlin v. People of the State of California
- Docket no.: 06-8120
- Citations: 551 U.S. 249 (more) 127 S. Ct. 2400; 168 L. Ed. 2d 132; 2007 U.S. LEXIS 7897; 75 U.S.L.W. 4444; 20 Fla. L. Weekly Fed. S 365
- Argument: Oral argument

Case history
- Prior: Motion to suppress denied; reversed, California Court of Appeal; reversed, 136 P.3d 845 (Cal. 2006); cert. granted, 549 U.S. 1177 (2007).

Holding
- When police make a traffic stop, a passenger in the car, like the driver, is seized for Fourth Amendment purposes and so may challenge the stop’s constitutionality.

Court membership
- Chief Justice John Roberts Associate Justices John P. Stevens · Antonin Scalia; Anthony Kennedy · David Souter; Clarence Thomas · Ruth Bader Ginsburg; Stephen Breyer · Samuel Alito

Case opinion
- Majority: Souter, joined by unanimous

Laws applied
- U.S. Const. amend. IV

Brendlin v. California, 551 U.S. 249 (2007), was a decision by the Supreme Court of the United States that held that all occupants of a car are "seized" for purposes of the Fourth Amendment during a traffic stop, not just the driver.

== Facts ==
In the early morning hours of November 27, 2001, a Sutter County deputy sheriff and his partner, who was a cadet at the time, stopped a car in which Bruce Brendlin was riding. The car's registration had expired, but the owner had applied for a renewal, and a valid temporary registration permit was properly affixed to the car. Nevertheless, the deputy decided to investigate further. He asked the driver of the car, Karen Simeroth, for her license, and noticed that Bruce Brendlin, "one of the Brendlin brothers," was sitting in the passenger seat. The deputy determined that there was a warrant out for Brendlin's arrest, and so he called for backup. Once backup arrived, Brendlin and Simeroth were arrested. The police found an orange syringe cap on Brendlin's person while on Simeroth's person and vehicle, they found methamphetamine, marijuana, and various drug paraphernalia along with equipment used to manufacture methamphetamine in the car.

Brendlin was charged with possession and manufacture of methamphetamine. Before trial, he moved to suppress the evidence found on his person and in the car as fruits of an unlawful seizure—unlawful because, he argued, the police had acted in violation of his Fourth Amendment rights and had neither probable cause, reasonable suspicion, or any warrant to make the traffic stop or seize Brendlin or any of his possessions and use it against him in court. The trial court denied the motion, reasoning that Brendlin was first "seized" at the point he was removed from the car and arrested. Brendlin pleaded guilty but reserved the right to appeal the suppression issue, and was sentenced to four years in prison.

The California Court of Appeal reversed the trial court's denial of the motion to suppress. However, the California Supreme Court reversed the Court of Appeal, reinstating the trial court's decision. Although the State conceded that the police had no lawful basis to effect the traffic stop, the California Supreme Court still held that the trial court was correct in denying the motion to suppress because, it reasoned, "a passenger is not seized as a constitutional matter in the absence of additional circumstances that would indicate to a reasonable person that he or she was the subject of the peace officer's investigation or show of authority." Simeroth was the exclusive target of the traffic stop, and so Brendlin was not seized until the police did something else to cast their eyes upon him. The decision was at odds with several federal circuit courts of appeal.

The issue before the Court was whether a passenger in a vehicle subject to a traffic stop is thereby "detained" for purposes of the Fourth Amendment, thus allowing the passenger to contest the legality of the traffic stop.

== Opinion of the Court ==
A person is "seized" for purposes of the Fourth Amendment when physical force or a show of authority terminates or restrains his freedom of movement. If the police's intent to restrain an individual is unclear, or if an individual's submission to a show of authority takes the form of passive acquiescence, a seizure does not occur unless a reasonable person would not feel free to leave in light of all the circumstances. If, however, the person has no desire to leave for reasons unrelated to the traffic stop, there is no seizure.

Before the Court's decision in this case, the law was clear that a traffic stop seized the driver of the car. The Court had also repeatedly suggested—but never formally held—that a traffic stop in fact seizes everyone in the vehicle. With its decision in this case, the Court expressly so held. "We think that in these circumstances any reasonable passenger would have understood the police officers to be exercising control to the point that no one in the car was free to depart without police permission."

A traffic stop necessarily curtails the freedom of movement of all within the vehicle, and a reasonable person riding in a stopped vehicle would know that some wrongdoing led the police to stop the vehicle. At the same time, any occupant of the vehicle cannot be sure of the reason for the stop. "If the likely wrongdoing is not the driving, the passenger will reasonably feel subject to suspicion owing to close association; but even when the wrongdoing is only bad driving, the passenger will expect to be subject to some scrutiny, and his attempt to leave the scene would be so obviously likely to prompt an objection from the officer that no reasonable passenger would feel free to leave in the first place." Moreover, no passenger could expect an officer to allow him to move around in ways that might jeopardize the officer's safety.

The California Supreme Court went astray by making three assumptions with which the Court disagreed. First, it reasoned that Brendlin was not the initial focus of the police's investigation, being concerned as they were with verifying the registration of the car, which Brendlin did not own. But the Court pointed out that this reasoning ignores the focus of the Fourth Amendment on what a reasonable person would believe, not the subjective intentions of the officers. Second, the California court reasoned that Brendlin was not in a position to submit to the officers' show of authority because only the driver of the car could do so. But the acts that constitute submission to a show of authority depend on what the person was doing beforehand. As a passenger in a vehicle, Brendlin could not affirmatively submit until the vehicle was stopped on the side of the road. Third, the California Supreme Court resisted the conclusion the Court drew because it feared that occupants of cars merely stuck in traffic would also be "seized" under a contrary holding. But the Court noted that "incidental restrictions on freedom of movement would not tend to affect an individual's sense of security and privacy in traveling in an automobile." Indeed, the California court's holding was a kind of incentive for the police to conduct "roving patrols" that would violate the Fourth Amendment rights of drivers.

== See also ==
- List of United States Supreme Court cases, volume 551
- List of United States Supreme Court cases
- United States v. Drayton (2002)
- Manuel v. Joliet (2017)
