= United States v. Fuentes =

- Court: United States Court of Appeals for the Ninth Circuit
- Full case name: United States of America v. Juan Carlos Fuentes
- Submitted: December 10, 1996
- Decided: January 21, 1997
- Citations: 105 F.3d 487; 97 Cal. Daily Op. Serv. 463; 97 Daily Journal D.A.R. 72

Court membership
- Judges sitting: John T. Noonan Jr., David R. Thompson, Andrew Jay Kleinfeld

Case opinions
- Majority: Kleinfeld, joined by a unanimous court

Laws applied
- U.S. Const. amend. IV

United States v. Fuentes, 105 F.3d 487 (9th Cir. 1997), was a 1997 case in which the U.S. Court of Appeals for the Ninth Circuit ruled that "Mere refusal to consent to a stop or search does not give rise to reasonable suspicion or probable cause." The case involved a Terry stop at an airport of a suspected drug smuggler, and his subsequent flight attempt from Drug Enforcement Administration agents that, along with other suspicious factors, did give the officers probable cause to arrest him.
