= United States v. Matlock =

- Supreme Court of the United States

Argued December 10, 1973 Decided February 20, 1974
- Full case name: United States v. William Earl Matlock
- Citations: 415 U.S. 164 (more) 94 S. Ct. 988; 39 L. Ed. 2d 242; 1974 U.S. LEXIS 8

Case history
- Prior: Motion to suppress evidence granted, W.D. Wis.; affirmed, 476 F.2d 1083 (7th Cir. 1973); cert. granted, 412 U.S. 917 (1973).

Holding
- When the prosecution seeks to justify a warrantless search by proof of voluntary consent it is not limited to proof that consent was given by the defendant, but may show that permission to search was obtained from a third party who possessed common authority over or other sufficient relationship to the premises or effects sought to be inspected.

Court membership
- Chief Justice Warren E. Burger Associate Justices William O. Douglas · William J. Brennan Jr. Potter Stewart · Byron White; Thurgood Marshall · Harry Blackmun; Lewis F. Powell Jr. · William Rehnquist

Case opinions
- Majority: White, joined by Burger, Stewart, Blackmun, Powell, Rehnquist
- Dissent: Douglas
- Dissent: Brennan, joined by Marshall

Laws applied
- U.S. Const. amend. IV

United States v. Matlock, 415 U.S. 164 (1974), was a Supreme Court of the United States case in which the Court ruled that the Fourth Amendment prohibition on unreasonable searches and seizures was not violated when the police obtained voluntary consent from a third party who possessed common authority over the premises sought to be searched. The ruling of the court established the "co-occupant consent rule," which was later explained by Illinois v. Rodriguez, 497 U.S. 177 (1990) and distinguished later by Georgia v. Randolph (2006), in which the court held that a third party could not consent over the objections of a present co-occupant, and Fernandez v. California (2014), where the court held when the objecting co-resident is removed for objectively reasonable purposes (such as lawful arrest), the remaining resident may validly consent to search.

== See also ==
- List of United States Supreme Court cases, volume 415
