= United States v. Mendenhall =

- Supreme Court of the United States

Argued February 19, 1980 Decided May 27, 1980
- Full case name: United States v. Sylvia Mendenhall
- Citations: 446 U.S. 544 (more) 100 S. Ct. 1870; 64 L. Ed. 2d 497; 1980 U.S. LEXIS 102
- Argument: [ Oral argument]

Case history
- Prior: 596 F.2d 706 (6th Cir. 1979); cert. granted, 444 U.S. 822 (1979).
- Subsequent: Rehearing denied, 448 U.S. 908 (1980).

Holding
- A person is "seized" within the meaning of the Fourth Amendment if a "reasonable person" in the same position "would have believed that he was not free to leave." This test must be viewed under the totality of the circumstances.

Court membership
- Chief Justice Warren E. Burger Associate Justices William J. Brennan Jr. · Potter Stewart; Byron White · Thurgood Marshall; Harry Blackmun · Lewis F. Powell Jr. William Rehnquist · John P. Stevens

Case opinions
- Majority: Stewart (parts I, II-B, II-C, III), joined by Burger, Blackmun, Powell, Rehnquist
- Concurrence: Stewart (part II-A), joined by Rehnquist
- Concurrence: Powell, joined by Burger, Blackmun
- Dissent: White, joined by Brennan, Marshall, Stevens

Laws applied
- U.S. Const. amend. IV

United States v. Mendenhall, 446 U.S. 544 (1980), was a United States Supreme Court case that determined "seizure" occurs when an officer uses displays of authority to detain a person.

The United States Court of Appeals for the Sixth Circuit heard the appeal of Ms. Sylvia Mendenhall as pertaining to Ms. Mendenhall's alleged unconstitutional seizure by two DEA agents at Detroit Metropolitan Airport. The court ruled against the defendant in a 5–4 majority, though the court's Dissent shows confusion as to the majority vote.

The decision notably set a standard by which an otherwise-valid consensual stop could become unconstitutional, such as by "the threatening presence of several officers, the display of a weapon by an officer, some physical touching of the person of the citizen, or the use of language or tone of voice indicating that compliance with the officer's request might be compelled."

== Background ==
On the morning of February 10, 1976, Sylvia Mendenhall was walking through the concourse of Detroit Metropolitan Airport after disembarking a commercial flight returning from Los Angeles. During her walk through the airport, she was noticed by two Drug Enforcement Administration (DEA) agents. The two agents grew suspicious, later stating that she appeared to have the characteristics of a person unlawfully transporting narcotics. The agents approached Mendenhall and identified themselves as federal agents. Following procedure, they began to question Ms. Mendenhall; their questions included, "How long were you in California?" to which she responded by stating that hers was a short, two-day trip. The agents later asked her to present identification and an airline ticket. She presented her driver’s license and the airline ticket to the agents. The name on the driver’s license said “Sylvia Mendenhall”, yet the name on the airline ticket was “Annette Ford”. Upon questioning, she responded, “[I] just felt like using that name.” "Agent Anderson then specifically identified himself as a federal narcotics agent and, according to his testimony, the respondent "became quite shaken, extremely nervous. She had a hard time speaking." The agents requested that the respondent accompany them to the DEA office at the airport, and she complied. At the office, the agents asked for permission to inspect her handbag and her person and informed her of her right to decline. She responded, "Go ahead," while handing her purse to the agent. A female police officer conducted the search. The officer informed Mendenhall of her right to decline to the search. When asked to remove her clothes, Mendenhall explained that she needed to catch a flight, but she was assured that if no narcotics were found, she could proceed to the flight. Without further comments, she began to disrobe. Two packages were found beneath her undergarments and were handed to the policewoman. One package appeared to contain an illegal substance, and Mendenhall was arrested for possession of heroin. The United States District Court for the Eastern District of Michigan denied a motion to suppress the evidence. The court concluded that the agents' actions were permissible in investigating suspicion of criminal activity and that Mendenhall voluntarily accompanied the agents to the DEA office. Mendenhall was convicted and a court of appeals reversed the decision, stating that she did not properly consent to the search.

=== Drug-courier profile as testified by DEA agent ===
DEA agent Manuel Lopez testified that Mendenhall's behavior fit the profile of a drug courier, which was based upon an informally compiled abstract of characteristics believed to be typical of people carrying illicit drugs. These observations included the fact that Mendenhall's flight originated in Los Angeles, a city believed by the agents to be the origin for much of the heroin brought to Detroit. The agents also observed that Mendenhall was the last person to exit the plane and appeared very nervous, visually scanning the area where the agents were positioned, passed the baggage area without claiming any luggage and changed airlines for her next flight.

== Conflict ==
The issue before the court was whether Mendenhall's Fourth Amendment rights were violated. The court failed to construct a majority definition of "seizure". Regardless of Mendenhall's consent or the amount of coercion involved, there was sufficient evidence that she was provided the option to go on her way. According to Justice Stewart, evidence that Mendenhall was not asked to accompany agents to the DEA office was insufficient grounds upon which to deny that she had given consent. The court found that race, although not completely irrelevant, was not viewed as decisive evidence.

The Fourth Amendment serves "to prevent arbitrary and oppressive interference by enforcement officials with the privacy and personal security of individuals" (United States v. Martinez-Fuerte, 428 U.S. 543, 554). The court ruled that as long as person being questioned has the right to disregard questions and to voluntarily terminate the encounter, a search does not impede upon the person's liberty or privacy. The justices characterized police questioning as an effective manner of enforcing criminal law and concluded that the questioning of Mendenhall furthered the compelling interest of the DEA. "Without such investigation, those who were innocent might be falsely accused, those who were guilty might wholly escape prosecution, and many crimes would go unsolved. In short, the security of all would be diminished." (Schneckloth v. Bustamonte, 412 U.S. at 225.) Because Mendenhall was not held by force and could have walked away, she was determined to have not been seized by the DEA agents. The justices in the majority opinion sought to follow the precedent established in Terry v. Ohio. In Terry, the court ruled that a police officer acted lawfully when detaining three men who appeared to be acting suspiciously. The man named in the title of the case, John W. Terry, was unable to walk away and was forced to submit to a search. Based on the precedent provided by Terry, the search and seizure of Mendenhall was deemed lawful.

== Historical significance ==
=== State v. Cook, 107 Ohio App. 3d 154 (1995) ===
"Applying United States v. Mendenhall, defendant was seized when four officers approached and ordered [the defendant's] companion, then the defendant, to step out of [the defendant's] parked truck."

=== United States v. Drayton (2002) ===
In United States v. Mendenhall, the court determined that "seizure" occurs when an officer uses physical force or displays authority to detain a person. In United States v. Drayton, the court determined that the Fourth Amendment does not govern consensual encounters. In Drayton, a police officer identified himself and asked a passenger on the bus if the police had consent to perform a drug and illegal weapon search. Another officer stood at the front of the bus but did not block the exit. The court ruled that this did not violate constitutional rights.

Based on Mendenhall case, a law enforcement officer publicly approaching an individual and asking such individual questions is not a violation of the individual's Fourth Amendment rights. As long as the officer does not imply that compliance is mandatory, the officer may question or ask to examine the identification of an individual.

== Powell's Concurrence ==
"Mr. Justice Powell, with whom the Chief Justice and Mr. Justice Blackmun join, concurring in part and concurring in the judgment.

"I join Parts I, II-B, II-C, and III of the Court's opinion. Because neither of the courts below considered the question, I do not reach the Government's contention that the agents did not "seize" the respondent within the meaning of the Fourth Amendment. In my view, we may assume for present purposes that the stop did constitute a seizure. I would hold—as did the District Court—that the federal agents had reasonable suspicion that the respondent was engaging in criminal activity, and, therefore, that they did not violate the Fourth Amendment by stopping the respondent for routine questioning."

== White's Dissent ==
"Mr. Justice White, with whom Mr. Justice Brennan, Mr. Justice Marshall, and Mr. Justice Stevens join, dissenting.

"The Court today concludes that agents of the Drug Enforcement Administration (DEA) acted lawfully in stopping a traveler changing planes in an airport terminal and escorting her to a DEA office for a strip-search of her person. This result is particularly curious because a majority of the Members of the Court refuse to reject the conclusion that Ms. Mendenhall was "seized," while a separate majority decline to hold that there were reasonable grounds to justify a seizure. Mr. Justice Stewart concludes that the DEA agents acted lawfully, regardless of whether there were any reasonable grounds for suspecting Ms. Mendenhall of criminal activity, because he finds that Ms. Mendenhall was not "seized" by the DEA agents, even though, throughout the proceedings below, the Government never questioned the fact that a seizure had occurred necessitating a [display] of antecedent reasonable suspicion. Mr. Justice Powell's opinion concludes that, even though Ms. Mendenhall may have been "seized," the seizure was lawful, because her behavior while changing planes in the airport provided reasonable suspicion that she was engaging in criminal activity. The Court then concludes, based on the absence of evidence that Ms. Mendenhall resisted her detention, that she voluntarily consented to being taken to the DEA office, even though she, in fact, had no choice in the matter. This conclusion is inconsistent with our recognition that consent cannot be presumed from a showing of acquiescence to authority, and it cannot be reconciled with our decision last Term in Dunaway v. New York, 442 U.S. 200 (1979)."

=== Summary of Dissent ===
Mr. Justice White's reason for dissent is based on the contradiction that the majority does not refute that a "seizure" did occur, while at the same time a majority was unable to justify that the "seizure" was necessary. Mr. Justice Powell strongly believes that Ms. Mendenhall was forced into the search, even though there is a lack of evidence that she did not have the opportunity to leave.
