= Cupp v. Murphy =

- Supreme Court of the United States

Argued March 20, 1973 Decided May 29, 1973
- Full case name: Cupp, Penitentiary Superintendent v. Daniel Murphy
- Citations: 412 U.S. 291 (more) 93 S. Ct. 2000; 36 L. Ed. 2d 900; 1973 U.S. LEXIS 63

Holding
- In view of the station house detention upon probable cause, the very limited intrusion undertaken to preserve highly evanescent evidence was not violative of the Fourth and Fourteenth Amendments.

Court membership
- Chief Justice Warren E. Burger Associate Justices William O. Douglas · William J. Brennan Jr. Potter Stewart · Byron White; Thurgood Marshall · Harry Blackmun; Lewis F. Powell Jr. · William Rehnquist

Case opinions
- Majority: Stewart, joined by Burger, White, Marshall, Blackmun, Powell, Rehnquist
- Concurrence: White
- Concurrence: Marshall
- Concurrence: Blackmun, joined by Burger
- Concurrence: Powell, joined by Burger, Rehnquist
- Dissent: Douglas
- Dissent: Brennan

Cupp v. Murphy, 412 U.S. 291 (1973), was a United States Supreme Court case in which the Court upheld a murder conviction notwithstanding a challenge that the evidence upon which guilt was based was obtained in violation of the Fourth and Fourteenth Amendments of the United States Constitution. The court held that in view of the station-house detention upon probable cause, the very limited intrusion of scraping the defendant's fingernails for blood and other material, undertaken to preserve highly evanescent evidence, did not violate the Fourth and Fourteenth Amendments.

Justice Stewart wrote for the majority. Based on this decision, it is permissible for police officers to conduct a limited search on a defendant when they believe that the defendant is likely to destroy evidence, provided that the search is limited to vindicating the purpose of preserving evidence.

== Facts ==
Doris Murphy died of strangulation in her home in the city of Portland, Oregon. Investigators found abrasions and lacerations on her throat. There was no sign of a break-in or robbery. Upon receiving word of his ex-wife's murder, Daniel Murphy (then living with his new wife) promptly telephoned the Portland police and voluntarily came into Portland for questioning.

Shortly after arrival at the station house where he was represented by counsel, the investigating police noticed a dark spot on the respondent's finger. Suspecting that the spot might be dried blood and knowing that evidence of strangulation is often found under the assailant's fingernails, the police asked Murphy if they could take a sample of scrapings from his fingernails. He refused. Under protest and without a warrant, the police proceeded to take the samples, which turned out to contain traces of skin and blood cells, and fabric from the victim's nightgown. This incriminating evidence was admitted at the trial.

Daniel Murphy was convicted by a jury in an Oregon court of the second-degree murder of his wife.

== Procedural history ==
The procedural history of the case is rather complex. At trial, Murphy objected to the use of the fingernail evidence against him, arguing the evidence was obtained in violation of his rights under the Fourth and Fourteenth Amendments. The trial court denied Murphy's motion, and he was convicted. The Oregon Court of Appeals affirmed the conviction.

Having exhausted his rights on direct appeal, Murphy sought a writ of habeas corpus from the Federal District Court in Oregon. The District Court denied the writ without issuing an opinion. On appeal, the United States Court of Appeals for the Ninth Circuit reversed the District Court, explaining "that there were no such exigent circumstances existing at the time of the search which would require that it immediately be conducted without the procurement of a warrant...." See Murphy v. Cupp, 461 F.2d 1006, 1007 (9th Cir. 1972).

== Holding ==
When police have probable cause to believe a crime has been committed, the Fourth and Fourteenth Amendment permit the limited search of a suspect during a brief detention in a stationhouse when there exists a risk that the suspect may destroy readily destructible evidence and the scope of the search is limited to vindicating this interest.

=== Majority opinion ===
Noting first that there existed probable cause to believe that Murphy had committed the murder, Justice Stewart first dismissed arguments based on the illegality of the brief seizure which occurred at the stationhouse. Justice Stewart next turned to the search.

Unlike fingerprinting, voice exemplars, or handwriting exemplars, the court explained that the search of the respondent's fingernails went beyond mere "physical characteristics . . . constantly exposed to the public" constituting a "severe, though brief, intrusion upon cherished personal security" that is subject to constitutional scrutiny. Citing Chimel v. California, Justice Stewart reasoned that the search of Murphy's person was justified under an exception to the warrant requirement, the search incident to arrest. The basis for that exception is that when an arrest is made, the arrestee may attempt use any weapons he has and/or attempt to destroy any incriminating evidence in his possession. Of course, a warrantless search may not be so expansive so as to dwarf the rationale that excepts the search from the warrant requirement.

The Court declined to hold that a full Chimel search of Murphy would have been appropriate, as there had been no warrant for the search and no formal arrest. Given the circumstances of the case, Murphy was less likely to be hostile to the police and less likely to take conspicuous, immediate steps to destroy incriminating evidence on his person. Nonetheless, the court noted that the search which took place was appropriately limited in light of the absence of a formal arrest:

"At the time Murphy was being detained at the station house, he was obviously aware of the detectives' suspicions. Though he did not have the full warning of official suspicion that a formal arrest provides, Murphy was sufficiently apprised of his suspected role in the crime to motivate him to attempt to destroy what evidence he could without attracting further attention. Testimony at trial indicated that after he refused to consent to the taking of fingernail samples, he put his hands behind his back and appeared to rub them together. He then put his hands in his pockets, and a "metallic sound, such as keys or change rattling" was heard. The rationale of Chimel, in these circumstances, justified the police in subjecting him to the very limited search necessary to preserve the highly evanescent evidence they found under his fingernails."

=== Impact/weight of the opinion today ===
The practical effect of this decision is rather limited. The case presented a rather attenuated set of circumstances. However, the reasoning continues to be reaffirmed. See, e.g., Knowles v. Iowa, 525 U.S. 113 (1998). In Knowles, the Supreme Court held that the search of an automobile violated the Fourth and Fourteenth Amendments where, following the issuance of a traffic citation, and notwithstanding the permissibility of effecting a full custodial arrest for the infraction at issue, police did not arrest the suspect. According to the court, once the citation was issued, no further evidence of the offense was needed to prosecute. Thus, the need for a Cupp detention and search was not present.

=== Marshall's concurrence ===
Justice Marshall's concurring opinion emphasized that the detention and subsequent limited search of Murphy were justified by the extremely strange circumstances presented. According to Justice Marshall, when the officers noticed the possible evidence on Murphy's hands, "there was no way to preserve the status quo while a warrant was sought, and there was good reason to believe that Murphy might attempt to alter the status quo unless he were prevented from doing so." He emphasized the importance of (1) the narrow scope of the search and (2) that the scope was tied to the reasons justifying the brief detention.

=== Blackmun's concurrence ===
Justice Blackmun was concerned that the scope of the Chimel search was being narrowed. He emphasized that this holding should be confined to situations such as the one presented (where a formal arrest could have been, but was not, effected). He urged that the Chimel-search-incident-to-arrest framework continue to be applied when a full custodial arrest is made.

=== Powell's concurrence ===
Justice Powell agreed with the reasoning of the majority. He wrote separately to address a tangential issue based on his opinion in Schneckloth v. Bustamonte, i.e. that a claim such as Murphy's is properly available in federal habeas corpus only to the extent of ascertaining whether he was afforded a fair opportunity to raise and have adjudicated the question in state courts.

=== Douglas's dissent ===
Justice Douglas was skeptical that probable cause existed for Murphy's arrest. As such, he did not think the court should have decided the question raised. He thought this was evidenced by the decision of the police officers not to arrest Murphy at the station. He likewise challenged the extension of Chimel, explaining that this case was not covered by Chimel and that the court was misguided in so relying. He urged that Oregon should not have been able to use the evidence against Murphy.

=== Brennan's dissent ===
Justice Brennan argued that the issue of probable cause had not been decided. He thought that the case should be remanded to the Court of Appeals for such a determination.

== See also ==
- List of United States Supreme Court cases, volume 412
