= Goldstein v. California =

- Supreme Court of the United States

Argued December 13, 1972 Decided June 18, 1973
- Full case name: Goldstein v. California
- Docket no.: 71-1192
- Citations: 412 U.S. 546 (more) 93 S. Ct. 2303; 37 L. Ed. 2d 163; 1973 U.S. LEXIS 15

Court membership
- Chief Justice Warren E. Burger Associate Justices William O. Douglas · William J. Brennan Jr. Potter Stewart · Byron White; Thurgood Marshall · Harry Blackmun; Lewis F. Powell Jr. · William Rehnquist

Case opinions
- Majority: Burger, joined by Stewart, White, Powell, Rehnquist
- Dissent: Douglas, joined by Brennan, Blackmun
- Dissent: Marshall, joined by Brennan, Blackmun

Goldstein v. California, 412 U.S. 546 (1973), was a United States Supreme Court case in which the high court ruled that California's state statutes criminalizing record piracy did not violate the Copyright Clause of the United States Constitution.

== Background ==
Between April 1970 and March 1971, Goldstein purchased recordings (vinyl or tape) and reproduced them, without any contractual permission from or payment to the rights holders, onto blank tapes, which he then distributed for sale. He was charged under a California statute that made it a criminal offense to duplicate and sell records or tapes without permission from the owners of the master recording. At the time of the infringement, there was no federal copyright law covering sound recordings (As of 2014 sound recordings fixed before February 15, 1972 remain outside the purview of federal copyright law). Goldstein argued that California lacked authority to enact state copyright law that conflicted with federal law under the Supremacy Clause of the Constitution, and that its unlimited duration conflicted with the provision of the Copyright Clause which states that "exclusive Right[s]" of copyright be for "limited Times".

== Holding ==
Justice Warren Burger, writing for the 5-4 majority, held that the Copyright Clause did not exclusively invest Congress with the power to enact copyright law, and thus state copyright was in principle valid. If states choose to protect more copyrightable works than the federal government does, they are not prohibited from doing so by the Supremacy Clause. He also held that state laws are not subject to the durational limitation the Copyright Clause enforces on federal copyright.

Justice William O. Douglas filed a dissent asserting that the Supremacy Clause was implicated in state extension of copyright to materials not protected federally, just as it would for a state extension of duration beyond the term of a federally granted copyright.

Justice Thurgood Marshall filed a separate dissent, arguing that Congressional copyright decisions reflected a balance between free competition and the promotion of invention (as stated in the Copyright Clause), and that, piracy's unsavoriness notwithstanding, unless Congressional action indicated that copyright was needed to promote invention in this case, no copyright protection could be afforded by states in lieu. (By the time this case had been decided, Congress had passed the Sound Recordings Act of 1971, which extended federal protection to newly created recordings.)
