= Georgia v. Randolph =

- Supreme Court of the United States

Argued November 8, 2005 Decided March 22, 2006
- Full case name: Georgia v. Scott Fitz Randolph
- Docket no.: 04-1067
- Citations: 547 U.S. 103 (more) 126 S. Ct. 1515; 164 L. Ed. 2d 208; 2006 U.S. LEXIS 2498; 74 U.S.L.W. 4176

Case history
- Prior: Defendant's motion to suppress evidence denied, State v. Randolph, Sumter Superior Court; reversed, 590 S.E.2d 834 (Ga. Ct. App. 2003); cert. granted, Supreme Court of Georgia, April 28, 2004; affirmed, 604 S.E.2d 835 (Ga. 2004); cert. granted, sub. nom. Georgia v. Randolph, 125 S. Ct. 1840 (2005)

Holding
- In the circumstances here at issue, a physically present co-occupant's stated refusal to permit entry prevails, rendering the warrantless search unreasonable and invalid as to him.

Court membership
- Chief Justice John Roberts Associate Justices John P. Stevens · Antonin Scalia; Anthony Kennedy · David Souter; Clarence Thomas · Ruth Bader Ginsburg; Stephen Breyer · Samuel Alito

Case opinions
- Majority: Souter, joined by Stevens, Kennedy, Ginsburg, Breyer
- Concurrence: Stevens
- Concurrence: Breyer
- Dissent: Roberts, joined by Scalia
- Dissent: Scalia
- Dissent: Thomas
- Alito took no part in the consideration or decision of the case.

Laws applied
- U.S. Const. amend. IV

Georgia v. Randolph, 547 U.S. 103 (2006), is a case in which the U.S. Supreme Court held that without a search warrant, police had no constitutional right to search a house where one resident consents to the search while another resident objects. The Court distinguished this case from the "co-occupant consent rule" established in United States v. Matlock, 415 U.S. 164 (1974), which permitted one resident to consent in absence of the co-occupant.

== Background ==
Respondent Scott Randolph and his wife, Janet Randolph, separated in late May 2001, when she left the marital residence in Americus, Georgia, and went to stay with her parents in Canada, taking their son and some belongings. In July, she returned to the Americus house with the child; the record does not register her motive for returning.

On the morning of July 6, she complained to the police that, after a domestic dispute, her husband had taken their son from the marital residence, and when the police reached the Randolph house, she told them that her husband was a cocaine user whose drug use habit had caused the family financial troubles. She mentioned the marital problems, saying that she and their son had only recently returned after a several weeks' stay with her parents. Shortly after the policemen arrived, Scott Randolph returned, explaining to them that he had removed their son to a neighbor's house, worried that his wife might again take the boy out of the U.S.; Scott Randolph denied using cocaine, and countered that it was his wife, Janet, who used illegal drugs and abused alcohol.

One of the policemen, Sergeant Murray, went with Janet Randolph to reclaim the Randolph child from the neighbor; when they returned, she renewed her complaints about her husband's drug use and volunteered that there were “items of drug evidence” in the house. Sergeant Murray asked Scott Randolph for permission to search the house; he refused. The sergeant then asked Janet Randolph's consent to search the Randolph house, which she readily gave, and then led him to an upstairs bedroom she identified as Scott's, where the sergeant noticed a section of a drinking straw with a powder residue he suspected was cocaine. He then left the house to get an evidence bag from his patrol car, and to call the district attorney's office, which instructed him to stop the search and apply for a search warrant. When Sergeant Murray returned to the house, Janet Randolph withdrew her consent to searching the house. The police took the drinking straw to the police station, along with the arrested occupants. After obtaining a search warrant, they returned to the Randolph house and seized further evidence of illegal drug use, on the basis of which Scott Randolph was indicted for possession of cocaine.

At court, Scott Randolph moved to suppress the evidence, as products of a warrantless search of his house, unauthorized by his wife's consent over his express refusal. The trial court denied the motion, ruling that Janet Randolph had "common authority" to consent to the search.

== Opinion of the Court ==
In a 5-3 opinion written by Justice Souter, the Court held a co-resident could refuse consent to a police search, even if another resident consented. Specifically:

The question here is whether such an evidentiary seizure is likewise lawful with the permission of one occupant when the other, who later seeks to suppress the evidence, is present at the scene and expressly refuses to consent. We hold that, in the circumstances here at issue, a physically present co- occupant's stated refusal to permit entry prevails, rendering the warrantless search unreasonable and invalid as to him.

The Court's decision distinguished its previous rulings in Illinois v. Rodriguez, 497 U.S. 177 (1990) and United States v. Matlock, 415 U.S. 164 (1974). In Rodriguez and Matlock the police obtained voluntary consent from a co-occupant at the residence and found evidence implicating another resident who was not present when the police obtained consent. The Court said that the present case was different from the previous two in that the co-resident was not present to refuse consent to the search. In Rodriguez the co-occupant who later objected to the search was asleep in a bedroom within the residence; in Matlock, the later-objecting co-occupant was located in a nearby police vehicle.

Justice Alito, who had yet to be confirmed when the case was argued, did not participate in the argument or decision of the case.

=== Justice Stevens's concurrence ===
Justices Stevens and Breyer separately concurred with the Court majority opinion. Justice Stevens's concurrence attacked the "originalists" view of the Fourth Amendment, noting that the search would remain prohibited had the Court attempted to apply the law based upon the meaning intended by the Founding Fathers, noting that when the Fourth Amendment was written, the law of the time would have made the husband the "master of his house":

In the 18th century . . . given the then-prevailing dramatic differences between the property rights of the husband and the far lesser rights of the wife, only the consent of the husband would matter. Whether "the master of the house" consented or objected, his decision would control. Thus, if "original understanding" were to govern the outcome of this case, the search was clearly invalid because the husband did not consent. History, however, is not dispositive, because it is now clear, as a matter of constitutional law, that the male and the female are equal partners.

=== Justice Breyer's concurrence ===
Justice Breyer's concurrence stressed that the majority opinion was rather specific, writing "the circumstances here include the following":

The search at issue was a search solely for evidence. The objecting party was present and made his objection known clearly and directly to the officers seeking to enter the house. The officers did not justify their search on grounds of possible evidence destruction. Cf. Thornton v. United States, 541 U.S. 615, 620–622 (2004); Skinner v. Railway Labor Executives' Assn., 489 U.S. 602, 623 (1989); Schmerber v. California, 384 U.S. 757, 770–771 (1966). And, as far as the record reveals, the officers might easily have secured the premises and sought a warrant permitting them to enter. See Illinois v. McArthur, 531 U.S. 326 (2001). Thus, the "totality of the circumstances" present here do not suffice to justify abandoning the Fourth Amendment's traditional hostility to police entry into a home without a warrant. I stress the totality of the circumstances, however, because, were the circumstances to change significantly, so should the result.

=== Chief Justice Roberts's dissent ===
Chief Justice Roberts feared the Court's ruling would limit the ability of police to combat domestic violence. Chief Justice Roberts also noted that the purpose of the Fourth Amendment was to protect individual privacy, but any person who shares a dwelling (or, as Chief Justice Roberts points out, a locker or a hard drive) with another person may anticipate that the other person sharing access to their belongings might turn them over to authorities. In short, to share a home with someone is to surrender privacy as to that person, who might then consent to an invasion of it. Roberts also asserted that the majority opinion was arbitrary, as previous case law had held an objecting resident who was being held in the police car, as opposed to in the house, could be ignored with respect to the search.

=== Justice Scalia's dissent ===
Justice Antonin Scalia wrote a short dissent as a response to Justice Stevens's concurrence:

The issue of who could give such consent generally depended, in turn, on “historical and legal refinements” of property law. As property law developed, individuals who previously could not authorize a search might become able to do so, and those who once could grant such consent might no longer have that power . . . There is nothing new or surprising in the proposition that our unchanging Constitution refers to other bodies of law that might themselves change . . . Finally, I must express grave doubt that today’s decision deserves Justice Stevens’ celebration as part of the forward march of women’s equality. Given the usual patterns of domestic violence, how often can police be expected to encounter the situation in which a man urges them to enter the home while a woman simultaneously demands that they stay out?

== Further cases ==
In August 2006, a California trial court suppressed evidence after police acquired an absent resident's permission to enter a dwelling, but failed to knock-and-announce before entering to discover another resident using drugs. In Fernandez v. California (2014), the Supreme Court held that, when the resident who objects to the search of the dwelling is removed for objectively reasonable purposes (such as lawful arrest), the remaining resident may validly consent to search.

== See also ==
- List of United States Supreme Court cases, volume 547
- List of United States Supreme Court cases
