= Fernandez v. California =

- Supreme Court of the United States

Argued November 13, 2013 Decided February 25, 2014
- Full case name: Walter Fernandez, Petitioner v. California
- Docket no.: 12-7822
- Citations: 571 U.S. 292 (more) 134 S. Ct. 1126, 188 L. Ed. 2d 25, 82 U.S.L.W. 4102

Holding
- When a resident who objects to the search of his dwelling is removed for objectively reasonable purposes (such as lawful arrest), the remaining resident may validly consent to search.

Court membership
- Chief Justice John Roberts Associate Justices Antonin Scalia · Anthony Kennedy; Clarence Thomas · Ruth Bader Ginsburg; Stephen Breyer · Samuel Alito; Sonia Sotomayor · Elena Kagan

Case opinions
- Majority: Alito, joined by Roberts, Scalia, Kennedy, Thomas, Breyer
- Concurrence: Scalia
- Concurrence: Thomas
- Dissent: Ginsburg, joined by Sotomayor, Kagan

Laws applied
- U.S. Const. amend. IV

Fernandez v. California, 571 U.S. 292 (2014), was a U.S. Supreme Court case that explored the limits of Georgia v. Randolph, a 2006 case that held that consent to search a dwelling is invalid in the presence of an objecting co-resident. Fernandez, however, held that when the objecting co-resident is removed for objectively reasonable purposes (such as lawful arrest), the remaining resident may validly consent to search.

== Case aspects ==
=== Supreme Court case law precedent ===
Fernandez v. California is governed by two cases: the 1974 decision United States v. Matlock and the 2005 decision Georgia v. Randolph. In Matlock, the U.S. Supreme Court articulated the “co-occupant consent rule,” under which anyone who has “common authority” over a home may consent to a search of that home.

The Court defined “common authority” as “mutual use of the property by persons generally having joint access or control for most purposes, so that it is reasonable to recognize that any of the co-inhabitants has the right to permit the inspection in his own right and that the others have assumed the risk that one of their number might permit the common area to be searched.” Thus, any person who is a “joint occupant” may validly consent to a police search of the shared residence without a warrant.

In Georgia v. Randolph, the Court limited Matlock by holding that when physically present co-occupants disagree about whether to allow a search, the police may not proceed if any one of them objects.

=== Case background ===
When police arrived at Fernandez’s apartment, they believed a suspect in a gang-related assault had just entered. While approaching the apartment, they heard screaming and fighting inside. Police knocked on the door, which was answered by Fernandez’s bloodied girlfriend. Suspecting domestic violence, officers attempted to separate the two. Fernandez refused, shouting, “You don’t have a right to come in here. I know my rights.” The officers soon realized that Fernandez was the assault suspect and arrested him.

About an hour later the police returned and obtained the girlfriend’s consent to search the apartment, which she gave. Fernandez later challenged the validity of this third-party consent. Counsel for Fernandez were attorneys Jeff Fisher and Gerald Peters.

== Supreme Court decision ==
By a vote of six to three, the Court ruled that the search which followed the arrest of defendant Fernandez did not violate the Constitution, because Fernandez was no longer physically there and had been removed for fair reasons. Respect for the girlfriend's independent voluntary consent requires that it be honored. The three dissenting judges argued that the girlfriend had been pressured into consenting, and that police should have gotten a search warrant once they knew Fernandez objected to the search.
