= Ohio v. Robinette =

- Supreme Court of the United States

Argued October 8, 1996 Decided November 18, 1996
- Full case name: State of Ohio, Petitioner v. Robert D. Robinette
- Citations: 519 U.S. 33 (more) 117 S. Ct. 417; 136 L. Ed. 2d 347; 1996 U.S. LEXIS 6971; 65 U.S.L.W. 4013; 148 A.L.R. Fed. 739; 96 Cal. Daily Op. Service 8278; 96 Daily Journal DAR 13761; 10 Fla. L. Weekly Fed. S 200

Case history
- Prior: Conviction reversed by the Ohio Supreme Court, 653 N.E.2d 695 (Ohio 1995); certiorari granted, 516 U.S. 1157 (1996).

Holding
- The Fourth Amendment does not require the police to inform a motorist during a traffic stop that they are "free to go" before asking questions unrelated to the purpose of the stop.

Court membership
- Chief Justice William Rehnquist Associate Justices John P. Stevens · Sandra Day O'Connor; Antonin Scalia · Anthony Kennedy; David Souter · Clarence Thomas; Ruth Bader Ginsburg · Stephen Breyer

Case opinions
- Majority: Rehnquist, joined by O'Connor, Scalia, Kennedy, Souter, Thomas, Breyer
- Concurrence: Ginsburg
- Dissent: Stevens

Laws applied
- U.S. Const. amend. IV

Ohio v. Robinette, 519 U.S. 33 (1996), was a United States Supreme Court case in which the Court held that the Fourth Amendment does not require police officers to inform a motorist at the end of a traffic stop that they are free to go before seeking permission to search the motorist's car.

== Background ==
While driving on a stretch of Interstate 70 north of Dayton, Ohio, Robert Robinette was stopped for speeding. After verifying that Robinette had no prior violations, the officer asked Robinette to step out of his car before issuing him a verbal warning. The officer handed over Robinette's driver's license, and then asked him if he had any drugs or weapons in his car. Robinette said he did not. The officer asked Robinette if he could search the car, and Robinette agreed. The officer found a small amount of marijuana and a tablet of ecstasy. Robinette was arrested for possession of a controlled substance.

Before trial, Robinette moved to suppress the evidence seized from his car, but the trial court denied that request. Robinette then pleaded no contest to the charge. On appeal, the Ohio District Court of Appeal reversed the conviction, ruling that the search resulted from an illegal detention. The Ohio Supreme Court affirmed, ruling that the police must end a traffic stop by informing a motorist that they are free to leave before attempting to engage the motorist in a consensual interrogation or search their car. The U.S. Supreme Court agreed to review the case.

== Majority opinion ==
Chief Justice William Rehnquist, writing for the majority, stated that "The touchstone of the Fourth Amendment is reasonableness," and reasonableness is measured by examining the totality of the circumstances. This kind of fact-specific inquiry does not accommodate bright-line rules, as the Court has repeatedly held. In fact, in Schneckloth v. Bustamonte, 412 U.S. 218 (1973), the Court had rejected a rule similar to the one adopted by the Ohio Supreme Court in this case. In Schneckloth the Court refused to adopt a rule that a search predicated on a suspect's consent is unreasonable unless the suspect knew he had the right to refuse to consent to the search. The Court reasoned it would be impractical to require the police to explain to a suspect in any detail his right to refuse consent to a search. For the same reason, the Court reasoned it would be "unrealistic to require police officers to always inform detainees that they are free to go before a consent to search may be deemed voluntary." Rather, voluntariness is a fact to be determined from all the circumstances surrounding the search.

Justice Ruth Bader Ginsburg concurred in the judgment of the Court. Ginsburg emphasized that the Court's holding only construed the Fourth Amendment, and that in light of the particular circumstances present in Ohio—where stops similar to Robinette's were frequently used as a pretext to search for drugs—the Ohio Supreme Court was free to adopt the first-tell-then-ask rule it articulated as part of Ohio law, without imposing that requirement on the rest of the states.

== Dissenting opinion ==
Justice John Paul Stevens concluded that the traffic stop was unlawful. The officer asked Robinette if he could ask him one more question before Robinette left. Stevens argued that a reasonable person, when faced with such a question from a police officer during a traffic stop, would not feel free to leave and not feel free to refuse to answer. Accordingly, the officer had continued to detain Robinette beyond the end of the traffic stop. These conclusions of the Ohio Supreme Court were derived entirely from federal law, and thus did not impose a new obligation on other states in the guise of interpreting federal law. For this reason, Justice Stevens noted he would have affirmed the judgment of the Ohio Supreme Court.

== See also ==
- List of United States Supreme Court cases, volume 519
- List of United States Supreme Court cases
- Lists of United States Supreme Court cases by volume
