= List of United States Supreme Court cases, volume 412 =

This is a list of all the United States Supreme Court cases from volume 412 of the United States Reports:

| Case name | Citation | Date decided |
|---|---|---|
| Hall v. Cole | 412 U.S. 1 | 1973 |
| Chaffin v. Stynchcombe | 412 U.S. 17 | 1973 |
| Michigan v. Payne | 412 U.S. 47 | 1973 |
| NLRB v. Boeing Co. | 412 U.S. 67 | 1973 |
| Machinists v. NLRB | 412 U.S. 84 | 1973 |
| Sch. Bd. v. State Bd. of Ed. | 412 U.S. 92 | 1973 |
| CBS v. DNC | 412 U.S. 94 | 1973 |
| Keeble v. United States | 412 U.S. 205 | 1973 |
| Schneckloth v. Bustamonte | 412 U.S. 218 | 1973 |
| Cupp v. Murphy | 412 U.S. 291 | 1973 |
| Doe v. McMillan | 412 U.S. 306 | 1973 |
| United States v. Bishop | 412 U.S. 346 | 1973 |
| United States v. Tax Comm'n | 412 U.S. 363 | 1973 |
| United States v. Mason | 412 U.S. 391 | 1973 |
| United States v. Chi. B. & Q.R.R. Co. | 412 U.S. 401 | 1973 |
| Northcross v. Bd. of Ed. | 412 U.S. 427 | 1973 |
| Douglas v. Buder | 412 U.S. 430 | 1973 |
| Strunk v. United States | 412 U.S. 434 | 1973 |
| Vlandis v. Kline | 412 U.S. 441 | 1973 |
| Wardius v. Oregon | 412 U.S. 470 | 1973 |
| Mattz v. Arnett | 412 U.S. 481 | 1973 |
| Kenosha v. Bruno | 412 U.S. 507 | 1973 |
| Logue v. United States | 412 U.S. 521 | 1973 |
| United States v. Nevada | 412 U.S. 534 | 1973 |
| Fri v. Sierra Club | 412 U.S. 541 | 1973 |
| Dean v. Gadsden Times Pub'g Corp. | 412 U.S. 543 | 1973 |
| Goldstein v. California | 412 U.S. 546 | 1973 |
| United States v. Little Lake Misere Land Co. | 412 U.S. 580 | 1973 |
| Weinberger v. Hynson, Westcott & Dunning, Inc. | 412 U.S. 609 | 1973 |
| CIBA Corp. v. Weinberger | 412 U.S. 640 | 1973 |
| Weinberger v. Bentex Pharmaceuticals, Inc. | 412 U.S. 645 | 1973 |
| USV Pharmaceutical Corp. v. Weinberger | 412 U.S. 655 | 1973 |
| United States v. Students Challenging Regulatory Agency Procedures (SCRAP) | 412 U.S. 669 | 1973 |
| Gaffney v. Cummings | 412 U.S. 735 | 1973 |
| White v. Regester | 412 U.S. 755 | 1973 |
| White v. Weiser | 412 U.S. 783 | 1973 |
| Atchison T. & S.F.R.R. Co. v. Wichita Bd. of Trade | 412 U.S. 800 | 1973 |
| Barnes v. United States | 412 U.S. 837 | 1973 |
| Henry v. Warner | 412 U.S. 1201 | 1973 |
