= Florida v. Bostick =

- Supreme Court of the United States

Argued February 26, 1991 Decided June 20, 1991
- Full case name: State of Florida v. Terrance Bostick
- Citations: 501 U.S. 429 (more) 111 S. Ct. 2382; 115 L. Ed. 2d 389

Case history
- Prior: Bostick v. State, 554 So. 2d 1153 (Fla. 1989)

Holding
- A search of a passenger on a bus is not unreasonable simply because the search takes place on a bus. The search is reasonable if, under all the circumstances, the suspect felt free to decline the officers' request for a search and leave the scene.

Court membership
- Chief Justice William Rehnquist Associate Justices Byron White · Thurgood Marshall; Harry Blackmun · John P. Stevens; Sandra Day O'Connor · Antonin Scalia; Anthony Kennedy · David Souter

Case opinions
- Majority: O'Connor, joined by Rehnquist, White, Scalia, Kennedy, Souter
- Dissent: Marshall, joined by Blackmun, Stevens

Laws applied
- U.S. Const. amend. IV

Florida v. Bostick, 501 U.S. 429 (1991), was a United States Supreme Court case that overturned a per se rule imposed by the Florida Supreme Court that held consensual searches of passengers on buses were always unreasonable. The Court ruled that the fact that the search takes place on a bus is one factor in determining whether a suspect feels free to decline the search and walk away from the officers.

== Background ==
The sheriff's department in Broward County, Florida, instituted a drug interdiction program. A bus bound from Miami to Atlanta made a stop in Fort Lauderdale, and two Broward County sheriff's department officers boarded. The two officers approached Bostick, who was a passenger on the bus, and asked for his ticket and his identification. They then explained that they were narcotics interdiction officers, and asked Bostick for permission to search his luggage. Whether or not Bostick was told that he was free to decline the search is a matter of dispute. The officers found cocaine in Bostick's luggage, and arrested him.

Bostick asked the trial court to suppress the cocaine. The trial court denied the motion, and Bostick pleaded guilty to trafficking in cocaine but specifically reserved the right to appeal against the denial of his suppression motion. The intermediate appellate court affirmed, but the Florida Supreme Court ruled that the search violated the Fourth Amendment because it took place on a bus.

The State of Florida petitioned the U.S. Supreme Court for a writ of certiorari, which was granted. Joan Fowler argued the case for the State of Florida, and Solicitor General Kenneth Starr also argued for reversing the judgment of the Florida Supreme Court. Donald B. Ayer argued for Bostick, and the ACLU submitted an amicus curiae brief on Bostick's behalf.

== Opinion of the Court ==
The Fourth Amendment forbids "unreasonable" searches and seizures. When the police detain a person for any length of time, it is a "seizure" within the meaning of the Fourth Amendment. The Court has found not all seizures to be unreasonable, and much Fourth Amendment law consists of explaining what makes certain governmental actions "unreasonable."

Justice O'Connor began by reciting certain basic ideas about what does not make a seizure unreasonable. It is not unreasonable for the police to approach a citizen and ask him a few questions, as long as a reasonable person would feel free to disregard the questions and carry on with his business. For police activity to constitute a seizure, the Court had held in Terry v. Ohio, 392 U.S. 1 (1968), that there must be a show of physical force or other authority. And in Florida v. Royer, 460 U.S. 491 (1983), the Court had remarked that the police could approach a suspect in a public place (there, an airport concourse) and ask him a few questions without violating the Fourth Amendment.

The question in Bostick was whether the fact that the police approached the defendant while he was a passenger on a bus, by itself, rendered the encounter "unreasonable" under the Fourth Amendment. Justice O'Connor held it did not. In Michigan v. Chesternut, 486 U.S. 567 (1988), the Court had suggested that a seizure occurs whenever a reasonable person does not feel "free to leave" an encounter with the police. Justice O'Connor suggested that the Florida court's error in Bostick was that it "focus[ed] on whether Bostick was 'free to leave' rather than on the principle those words were intended to capture."

Bostick claimed he was not "free to leave" because the bus was scheduled to depart soon, and if it were to depart without him he would be separated from his luggage. But Bostick "would not have felt free to leave the bus even if the police had not been present. Bostick's movements were 'confined' in a sense, but this was the natural result of his decision to take the bus; it says nothing about whether or not the police conduct at issue was coercive." Thus, it was not through any display of authority or show of force on the police's part that Bostick felt he was not free to leave the scene of the encounter with the police. In the absence of such a show of authority, there was no justification for the Florida court's per se rule that a seizure had occurred simply because the encounter had taken place on a bus. Because the Florida courts had not engaged in the correct legal analysis, the Supreme Court sent the case back so that they could do so in the first instance.

=== Justice Marshall's dissent ===
Justice Marshall wrote a dissenting opinion, joined by Justice Blackmun and Stevens, portraying the law enforcement technique at issue in Bostick as one more likely to affect poor and minority citizens. Citing the low yield of actual drug traffickers, the admittedly arbitrary nature of the search, and the intrusive and intimidating style in which the police carry them out, Justice Marshall disputed the points relied on by Justice O'Connor to reach her conclusion.

To Justice Marshall, the facts of the case "exhibit all of the elements of coercion associated with a typical bus sweep." The officers wore jackets displaying the logo of the Broward County Sheriff's Department and brandished their badges. One of them carried a gun. They cornered Bostick at the back of the bus, blocking the aisle so that Bostick could not leave. While Justice O'Connor relies on the fact that the officers reminded Bostick he could refuse consent to the search, Justice Marshall points out that if Bostick had been unreasonably seized before they posed that question to Bostick, his consent was irrelevant. And for Justice Marshall, it was obvious that Bostick was not, in fact, free to terminate the encounter with the police. "Rather than requiring the police to justify the coercive tactics employed here, [Justice O'Connor] blames respondent for his own sensation of constraint.... Thus..., because respondent's freedom of movement was restricted by a factor independent of police conduct - i.e., by his being a passenger on a bus - [Bostick] was not seized for purposes of the Fourth Amendment."
