= Illinois v. Rodriguez =

- Supreme Court of the United States

Argued March 20, 1990 Decided June 21, 1990
- Full case name: Illinois v. Edward Rodriguez
- Citations: 497 U.S. 177 (more) 110 S. Ct. 2793; 111 L. Ed. 2d 148; 1990 U.S. LEXIS 3295; 58 U.S.L.W. 4892

Case history
- Prior: Cert. to Appellate Court of Illinois, 1st Dist. reversed and remanded

Holding
- Under the Fourth Amendment, a warrantless entry is valid when based upon the consent of a third party whom the police, at the time of the entry, reasonably believe to possess common authority over the premises, but who in fact does not.

Court membership
- Chief Justice William Rehnquist Associate Justices William J. Brennan Jr. · Byron White; Thurgood Marshall · Harry Blackmun; John P. Stevens · Sandra Day O'Connor; Antonin Scalia · Anthony Kennedy

Case opinions
- Majority: Scalia, joined by Rehnquist, White, Blackmun, O'Connor, Kennedy
- Dissent: Marshall, joined by Brennan, Stevens

Laws applied
- U.S. Const. amend. IV.

Illinois v. Rodriguez, 497 U.S. 177 (1990), is a U.S. Supreme Court case dealing with the issue of whether a warrantless search conducted pursuant to third party consent violates the Fourth Amendment when the third party does not actually possess common authority over the premises.

== Opinion of the Court ==
In an opinion by Justice Scalia and decided 6–3, the Court held that a warrantless search of premises, when a third party consents to the search but does not possess actual common authority over those premises, is valid if the authorities "reasonably believed" at the time of the search that the third party possessed common authority over the premises.

In reaching its decision, the Court noted that "reasonableness," not consent, is the touchstone of Fourth Amendment jurisprudence; the Constitution only prohibits "unreasonable" searches and seizures. Therefore, the constitutional validity of a police determination of consent to enter is not judged by whether the police were correct in their assessment, but by whether, based on the facts available at the moment, it was reasonable to conclude that the consenting party had authority over the premises.

== See also ==
- United States v. Matlock (1974)
- Georgia v. Randolph (2006)
- List of United States Supreme Court cases, volume 497
- List of United States Supreme Court cases
- Lists of United States Supreme Court cases by volume
- List of United States Supreme Court cases by the Rehnquist Court
