= Schneckloth v. Bustamonte =

- Supreme Court of the United States

Argued October 10, 1972 Decided May 29, 1973
- Full case name: Merle R. Schneckloth, Superintendent, California Conservation Center, Petitioner v. Robert Clyde Bustamonte
- Citations: 412 U.S. 218 (more) 93 S. Ct. 2041; 36 L. Ed. 2d 854
- Argument: Oral argument

Holding
- Consent searches are constitutional, and the government must show that consent existed. However, a defendant, under the Fourth Amendment, need not necessarily know of his right to object to a consent search. This differentiates the case from Miranda v. Arizona, where the Court held that a defendant must know of his/her rights against self-incrimination in the course of a custodial interrogation.

Court membership
- Chief Justice Warren E. Burger Associate Justices William O. Douglas · William J. Brennan Jr. Potter Stewart · Byron White; Thurgood Marshall · Harry Blackmun; Lewis F. Powell Jr. · William Rehnquist

Case opinions
- Majority: Stewart, joined by Burger, White, Blackmun, Powell, Rehnquist
- Concurrence: Blackmun
- Concurrence: Powell, joined by Burger, Rehnquist
- Dissent: Douglas
- Dissent: Brennan
- Dissent: Marshall

Laws applied
- U.S. Const. amends. IV, XIV

Schneckloth v. Bustamonte, 412 U.S. 218 (1973), was a U.S. Supreme Court case that ruled that in a case involving a consent search, although knowledge of a right to refuse consent is a factor in determining whether a grant of consent to a search was voluntary, the state does not need to prove that the person who granted consent to search knew of the right to refuse consent under the Fourth Amendment.

== Background ==
While on routine patrol in Sunnyvale, California, at approximately 2:40 in the morning, Officer James Rand stopped an automobile when he observed that one headlight and its license plate light were burned out. Six men were in the vehicle. Joe Alcala and the respondent, Robert Bustamonte, were in the front seat with Joe Gonzales, the driver. Three older men were seated in the rear. In response to the policeman's question, Gonzales could not produce a driver's license, Rand asked if any of the other five had any evidence of identification. Only Alcala produced a license, and he explained that the car was his brother's. After the six occupants had stepped out of the car at the officer's request, after two additional policemen had arrived, Rand asked Alcala if he could search the car. Alcala replied, "Sure, go ahead." Prior to the search, no one was threatened with arrest, and, according to Rand's uncontradicted testimony, it "was all very congenial at this time." Gonzales testified that Alcala actually helped in the search of the car by opening the trunk and glove compartment. In Gonzales' words:

"[T]he police officer asked Joe [Alcala], he goes, 'Does the trunk open?' And Joe said, 'Yes.' He went to the car and got the keys and opened up the trunk."

Wadded up under the left rear seat, the police officers found three checks that had previously been stolen from a car wash. The checks were later linked to Bustamonte (defendant), one of the six passengers riding in the car. The trial judge denied Bustamonte’s motion to suppress, and the checks in question were admitted in evidence at Bustamonte's trial.

== Holding ==
The court held that consent searches are constitutional, and the government must show that consent existed. However, a defendant under the Fourth Amendment need not necessarily know of his right to object to a consent search. That differentiates the case from Miranda v. Arizona in which the Court held that defendants must know of their rights against self-incrimination in the course of a custodial interrogation.
